= List of aircraft (Bf–Bo) =

This is a list of aircraft in alphabetical order beginning with 'Bf' through 'Bo'.

== Bf–Bo ==
=== BFW ===
(Bayerische Flugzeugwerke AG)

- BFW 1 Sperber
- BFW 3 Marabu
- BFW CL.I
- BFW CL.II
- BFW CL.III
- BFW Cl.IV
- BFW M.17
- BFW M.18
- BFW M.19
- BFW M.20
- BFW M.21
- BFW M.22
- BFW M.23
- BFW M.24
- BFW M.25
- BFW M.26
- BFW M.27
- BFW M.28
- BFW M.29
- BFW M.30
- BFW M.31
- BFW M.32
- BFW M.33
- BFW M.34
- BFW M.35
- BFW M.36
- BFW M.37 (Bf108)
- BFW Monoplane 1918
- BFW N.I
- BFW type 17 Cl.I
- BFW type 18 Cl.II

=== Bharat ===
- Bharat Swati

=== BIAA ===
(Beijing Institute of Aeronautics and Astronautics)

- BIAA Mifeng-1
- BIAA Mifeng-2
- BIAA Mifeng-3
- BIAA Mifeng-4
- BIAA Mifeng-4A
- BIAA Mifeng-5
- BIAA Mifeng-6
- BIAA Mifeng-7
- BIAA Mifeng-8
- BIAA Mifeng-9
- BIAA Mifeng-10
- BIAA Mifeng-11

=== Biddy-Buddy ===
(Rene Durenleau, Rantoul, IL)

- Biddy-Buddy 1958 Biplane

=== Bidwell ===
((William Burgess) Bidwell-(Shirley) Yale Aviation Co, Gardiner Airport, Portland, OR)

- Bidwell Cloud Buster Junior

=== Biemond ===
(C Biemond)

- Biemond CB-1

=== Biggs ===
(Floyd Biggs, OK)

- Biggs A Special

=== Bille S.A.C.A.N.A. ===
- Bille S.A.C.A.N.A. triplane bomber

=== Billman ===
- Billman B.11 Little Pink Cloud

=== Bilsam Aviation ===
(Poznań, Poland)

- Bilsam Sky Cruiser
- Bilsam Sky Walker
- Bilsam Sky Walker I
- Bilsam Sky Walker II
- Bilsam Ultra Cruiser

=== Bing ===
(George J. Bing)

- Bing 1911 biplane

=== Biplanes Of Yesteryear ===
(Ontario, OR)

- Biplanes Of Yesteryear Mifyter

=== Bircham ===
- Bircham Beetle

=== Bird ===
(Bird Aircraft Co. / (Joe & Harry) Brunner-(William E) Winkle Aircraft Corp, 17 Haverkamp St, Glendale, NY)

- Bird C
- Bird E
- Bird F
- Perth-Amboy RK

=== Bird ===
((W W) Bird Aircraft Co, 1905 Atlantic, San Diego, CA)

- Bird Air Bus 1

=== Bird ===
(Bird Corporation, Palm Springs, CA)

- Bird Innovator

=== Bird ===
(Cory Bird, Mojave, CA)

- Bird Symmetry

=== Birdman ===
- Birdman TL-1

=== Birdman ===
(Birdman Enterprises)

- Birdman Chinook WT-11-277
- Birdman Chinook WT-11-377
- Birdman Chinook 1S
- Birdman Chinook 2S
- ASAP Chinook Plus 2

=== Bird Wing ===
(Bird Wing Commercial Aircraft Co.)

- Bird Wing Model 1
- Bird Wing Imperial

=== BIS ===
(Bylinkin-Iordan-Sikorsky)

- BIS 1910 pusher biplane
- BIS 1910 tractor biplane

=== Bishop ===
- Bishop RB-1 Ray's Rebel

=== Bisnovat ===
- Bisnovat 5
- Bisnovat SK-1
- Bisnovat SK-2
- Bisnovat SK-3

=== Bittner ===
(Raymond Bittner, Chicago, IL)

- Brittner-Four
- Bittner RA-1

=== BJJR ===
- BJJR Bulldog

=== BK Fliers ===
(BK Fliers / Bruce King)

- BK Fliers BK-1

=== Bksut ===
- Bksut Eleisson

=== Blackburn ===
(deForest Blackburn, St Louis, MO)

- Blackburn Sportair Coupe

=== Blackburn ===
- Blackburn B-1 Segrave
- Blackburn B-2
- Blackburn B-3 (Specification M.1/30)
- Blackburn B-5 Baffin
- Blackburn B-6 Shark
- Blackburn B-7
- Blackburn B-9 (H.S.T. 10)
- Blackburn B-20
- Blackburn B-24 Skua
- Blackburn B-25 Roc
- Blackburn B-26 Botha
- Blackburn B-37 Firebrand F.I
- Blackburn B-44
- Blackburn B-45 Firebrand TF Mk.II
- Blackburn B-46 Firebrand TF Mk.IV
- Blackburn B-48 Firecrest (SBAC - Y.A.1)
- Blackburn B-54 (SBAC - Y.A.5, Y.A.7, Y.A.8)
- Blackburn B-88 (SBAC - Y.B.1)
- Blackburn B-101 Beverley
- Blackburn B-103 Buccaneer (SBAC - Y.B.3)
- Blackburn B-107A
- Blackburn B.T.1 Beagle
- Blackburn 2F.1 Nautilus
- Blackburn C.A.15C
- Blackburn C.B.2 Nile
- Blackburn F.1 Turcock
- Blackburn F.2 Lincock
- Blackburn F.3 (F.7/30)
- Blackburn G.P.
- Blackburn L.1 Bluebird
- Blackburn L.1c Bluebird IV
- Blackburn R.B.1 Iris
- Blackburn R.B.2 Sydney
- Blackburn R.B.3A Perth
- Blackburn R.T.1 Kangaroo
- Blackburn R.1 Blackburn
- Blackburn R.2 Airedale
- Blackburn T.1 Swift
- Blackburn T.2 Dart
- Blackburn T.3 Velos
- Blackburn T.4 Cubaroo
- Blackburn T.5 Ripon
- Blackburn T.7B
- Blackburn T.R.1 Sprat
- Blackburn T.B. Twin Blackburn
- Blackburn Type B
- Blackburn Type D
- Blackburn Type E
- Blackburn Type I
- Blackburn Type L
- Blackburn AD Scout
- Alula D.H.6
- Alula Semiquaver (1921) - single-engine experimental wing conversion of the Martinsyde Semiquaver
- Blackburn First Monoplane
- Blackburn Second Monoplane
- Blackburn Blackburd
- Blackburn Mercury
- Blackburn Pellet
- Blackburd Sidecar
- Blackburn Triplane
- Blackburn White Falcon

=== Black Diamond ===
(Diamond Airplane Co, Black Diamond, CA)

- Black Diamond 1910 Biplane

=== Blackshape ===
(Blackshape srl, Monopoli, Italy)

- Blackshape Prime

=== Blackstar ===
- Blackstar Plane

=== Blackwing Sweden ===
(Lund, Sweden)

- Blackwing Sweden Blackwing

=== Blake ===
- Blake Bluetit

=== Blanc ===
(Maurice Blanc)

- Monoplan Maurice Blanc 1911

=== Blanchard ===
(Société des Avions Blanchard)

- Blanchard BB-1
- Blanchard BB.2 (Anybody have a reference or evidence of this, or is it a typo / confusion with the BB.1?)
- Blanchard Brd.1

=== Blanchet ===
(Jean Blanchet)

- Blanchet JB.01 Chantecler
- Blanchet JB.60-2

=== Blavier ===
(Gérard Blavier)

- Blavier 8C2

=== Blenet ===
(Roger Blenet)

- Blenet RB.01 Jozé

=== Blériot ===
- Blériot four-engined bomber
- Blériot Parasol
- Blériot I
- Blériot II
- Blériot III
- Blériot IV
- Blériot V
- Blériot VI
- Blériot VII
- Blériot VIII
- Blériot IX
- Blériot X
- Blériot XI
- Blériot XII
- Blériot XIII
- Blériot XIV
- Blériot XV
- Blériot XXI
- Blériot XXIII
- Blériot XXIV
- Blériot XXV
- Blériot XXVII
- Blériot XXXIII Canard Bleu
- Blériot XXXVI Torpille
- Blériot XXXVIbis La Vache
- Blériot XXXIX
- Blériot XLII
- Blériot XLIII
- Blériot XLIV
- Blériot XLV
- Blériot 53
- Blériot 65
- Blériot 67
- Blériot 71
- Blériot 72
- Blériot 73
- Blériot 74
- Blériot 75
- Blériot 76
- Blériot 77
- Blériot 102
- Blériot 103
- Blériot 105
- Blériot 106
- Blériot 110
- Blériot 111
- Blériot 113
- Blériot 115
- Blériot 117
- Blériot 118
- Blériot 123
- Blériot 125
- Blériot 127
- Blériot 135
- Blériot 136
- Blériot 137
- Blériot 152
- Blériot 155
- Blériot 165
- Blériot 175
- Blériot 195
- Blériot 290
- Blériot 5190
- Blériot-SPAD S.XIV - single-seat fighter seaplane (1917)
- Blériot-SPAD S.XVII
- Blériot-SPAD S.XVIII
- Blériot-SPAD S.XX
- Blériot-SPAD S.XXI
- Blériot-SPAD S.XXII
- Blériot-SPAD S.XXIV
- Blériot-SPAD S.25
- Blériot-SPAD S.26
- Blériot-SPAD S.27
- Blériot-SPAD S.28
- Blériot-SPAD S.29
- Blériot-SPAD S.30
- Blériot-SPAD S.31
- Blériot-SPAD S.32
- Blériot-SPAD S.33
- Blériot-SPAD S.34
- Blériot-SPAD S.36
- Blériot-SPAD S.37
- Blériot-SPAD S.38
- Blériot-SPAD S.39
- Blériot-SPAD S.40
- Blériot-SPAD S.41
- Blériot-SPAD S.42
- Bleriot-SPAD S.45 (1921) 4-engine transport
- Blériot-SPAD S.46
- Blériot-SPAD S.48
- Blériot-SPAD S.50
- Blériot-SPAD S.51
- Blériot-SPAD S.54
- Blériot-SPAD S.54-1
- Blériot-SPAD S.56
- Blériot-SPAD S.58
- Blériot-SPAD S.60
- Blériot-SPAD S.61
- Blériot-SPAD S.62
- Blériot-SPAD S.64
- Blériot-SPAD S.66
- Blériot-SPAD S.70
- Blériot-SPAD S.71
- Blériot-SPAD S.72
- Blériot-SPAD S.81
- Blériot-SPAD S.82
- Blériot-SPAD S.86
- Blériot-SPAD S.91
- Blériot-SPAD S.92
- Blériot-SPAD S.116
- Blériot-SPAD S.126
- Blériot-SPAD S.510
- Blériot-SPAD S.540
- Blériot-SPAD S.710

=== Blessing ===
(Gerhard Blessing)

- Blessing Rebell

=== Bley ===
(Bley Flugzeugbau GmbH, Naumberg)

- Bley M-Condor

=== Blinderman-Mayorov ===
(И. А. Блиндерман & В. В. Майоров)

- Blinderman-Mayorov monoplane (named Ery or Kass (France, 1911))

=== Bloch ===
(Avions Marcel Bloch)

- Bloch MB.30 eight-seat twin-engined communications aircraft project (not built)
- Bloch MB.60
- Bloch MB.61
- Bloch MB.70
- Bloch MB.71
- Bloch MB.80
- Bloch MB.81
- Bloch MB.90
- Bloch MB.91
- Bloch MB.92
- Bloch MB.93
- Bloch MB.100
- Bloch MB.110
- Bloch MB.120
- Bloch MB.130
- Bloch MB.131
- Bloch MB.132
- Bloch MB.133
- Bloch MB.134
- Bloch MB.135
- Bloch MB.136
- Bloch MB.140(1) single-seat, single-engine low-wing monoplane derived from the MB.80, with a 140 hp Renault 4 Pei engine
- Bloch MB.140(2) three-seater four-engine, sort of a "Super 175" type
- Bloch MB.141
- Bloch MB.150
- Bloch MB.151
- Bloch MB.152
- Bloch MB.153
- Bloch MB.154
- Bloch MB.155
- Bloch MB.156
- Bloch MB.157
- Bloch MB.160
- Bloch MB.161 development of MB.160; produced postwar as the SE.161 Languedoc
- Bloch MB.162 Raid; mailplane derivative of the MB.160, replaced by bomber version
- Bloch MB.162 (II) bomber
- Bloch MB.162 Bn.5 unbuilt production version of MB.162
- Bloch MB.163 unbuilt development of MB.162
- Bloch MB.170 (I) civilian transport version of first MB.140 project
- Bloch MB.170 (II) twin-engine reconnaissance aircraft / light bomber (2 built)
- Bloch MB.171
- Bloch MB.172
- Bloch MB.173
- Bloch MB.174
- Bloch MB.175
- Bloch MB.176
- Bloch MB.177
- Bloch MB.178
- Bloch MB.179
- Bloch MB.200
- Bloch MB.201
- Bloch MB.202
- Bloch MB.203
- Bloch MB.210
- Bloch MB.211 Verdun
- Bloch MB.212
- Bloch MB.218
- Bloch MB.220
- Bloch MB.221
- Bloch MB.300 Pacifique
- Bloch MB.301 became the MD 311
- Bloch MB.303 became the MD 315
- Bloch MB.304
- Bloch MB.400
- Bloch MB.462
- Bloch MB.480
- Bloch MB.500 three-seat trainer
- Bloch MB.500 twin-engine, five-seat light transport; only a mockup
- Bloch MB.690
- Bloch MB.700
- Bloch MB.720 naval version of MB.700
- Bloch MB.730
- Bloch MB.800
- Bloch MB.900 produced as the SO.90
- Bloch MB.1010 fighter project from 1939, also known as SO.10 (not built)
- Bloch MB.1011 development of MB.1010, also known as SO.11 (not built)
- Bloch MB.1020 proposed 20 passenger airliner; only a fuselage completed by June 1040; also known as SO.20
- Bloch MB.1020R transport design with 2 × G&R 14R engines (1946)
- Bloch MB.1030 produced as the SO.30
- Bloch MB.1040 two-seat version of the MB.1010; also known as SO.40

=== Blohm & Voss ===
(For World War II projects with no RLM designation see: List of German aircraft projects, 1939-1945: Blohm & Voss)

- Blohm & Voss BV 138
- Blohm & Voss BV 141
- Blohm & Voss BV 142
- Blohm & Voss BV 143
- Blohm & Voss BV 144
- Blohm & Voss BV 155
- Blohm & Voss BV 222
- Blohm & Voss BV 237
- Blohm & Voss BV 238
- Blohm & Voss BV 246 Hagelkorn
- Blohm & Voss BV 250
- Blohm & Voss BV 40

=== Bloudek ===
- Bloudek XV Lojze

=== Blue Max Ulralight ===
- Blue Max Ultralight Blue Max

=== Blue Yonder ===
(Blue Yonder Aviation)

- Blue Yonder EZ Fun Flyer
- Blue Yonder Merlin
- Blue Yonder EZ Flyer
- Blue Yonder EZ King Cobra
- Blue Yonder Twin Engine EZ Flyer
- Blue Yonder EZ Harvard

=== Blume ===
- Blume Bl.500
- Blume Bl.502
- Blume Bl.503

=== Blume-Hentzen ===
- Blume-Hentzen Habicht

=== Bob Anderson Sport Aircraft ===
- Bob Anderson Sport Aircraft Mini-Coupe

=== Bock ===
(John W. Bock, Los Lunas, NM)

- Bock Model 2

=== Bode ===
(John Bode, Augusta, KS)

- Bode Drag 'n' Fly

=== Bodiansky ===
(Michel Bodiansky)

- Bodiansky 20
- Bodiansky 30

=== Boeing ===
- Boeing Model B-1
- Boeing Model B-1D
- Boeing Model B-1E
- Boeing 1 B & W Seaplane
- Boeing 2 C-4
- Boeing 3 C-5/C-6/C-11
- Boeing 4 EA
- Boeing 5 Model C
- Boeing 6 B-1
- Boeing 6D/E
- Boeing 7 BB-1
- Boeing 8 BB-L6
- Boeing 9 (Schedule 5336) Navy Boeing giant boat
- Boeing 10 GA-1/GA-2
- Boeing 10A BA-6
- Boeing 11 BA-11
- Boeing 12 BA-12
- Boeing 13 BA-5
- Boeing 14 BA-SP
- Boeing 15 PW-9/FB-1
- Boeing 16 O2B-1/DH-4M-1
- Boeing 17 T-3
- Boeing 18 NBS
- Boeing 19 BSP-1
- Boeing 20 coastal plane (Alaskan survey)
- Boeing 21 NB
- Boeing 22 Corps observation
- Boeing 23 Corps observation
- Boeing 24 USN two-seat fighter
- Boeing 25 secondary training aircraft
- Boeing 26 secondary training aircraft
- Boeing 27 secondary training aircraft
- Boeing 28 Liberty Corps observation
- Boeing 29 Corps observation
- Boeing 30 Corps observation
- Boeing 31 Corps observation - cross country type
- Boeing 32 light bombardment aircraft - proposal #2472 (as a bomber)
- Boeing 33 Corps observation - design "C"
- Boeing 34 Corps observation - design "D"
- Boeing 35 Corps observation - design "E"
- Boeing 36 Corps observation - design "F"
- Boeing 37 P.O proposal, April 7, 1924 - mail plane, design "A"
- Boeing 38 P.O proposal, April 7, 1924 - mail plane, design "B"
- Boeing 39 P.O proposal, April 7, 1924 - mail plane, design "C"
- Boeing 40 P.O proposal, April 7, 1924 - mail plane, design "D"
- Boeing 40A mail plane
- Boeing 41 P.O proposal, April 7, 1924 - mail plane, design "E"
- Boeing 42 XCO-7
- Boeing 43 USN three-engine bomber
- Boeing 44 patrol flying boat
- Boeing 45 USN bomber
- Boeing 46 USN pursuit (single-seat fighter)
- Boeing 47 USN pursuit (single-seat fighter)
- Boeing 48 USN pursuit (single-seat fighter)
- Boeing 49 transport aircraft
- Boeing 50 XPB
- Boeing 51 OB-1
- Boeing 52 experimental pursuit aircraft
- Boeing 53 FB-2
- Boeing 54 FB-4/FB-6
- Boeing 55 FB-3
- Boeing 56 amphibious fleet spotter aircraft
- Boeing 57 PW-9
- Boeing 58 XP-4
- Boeing 59 water-cooled pursuit aircraft
- Boeing 60 water-cooled pursuit aircraft
- Boeing 61 PW-9 with air-cooled engine
- Boeing 62 air-cooled pursuit aircraft
- Boeing 63 TB
- Boeing 64 experimental trainer
- Boeing 65 shipboard fighter
- Boeing 66 XP-8
- Boeing 67 FB-5
- Boeing 67A FB-7
- Boeing 68 AT-3
- Boeing 69 F2B-1
- Boeing 69A F2B-1
- Boeing 70 tandem engine, 10 passenger flying boat
- Boeing 71 twin-engine, 10 passenger flying boat
- Boeing 72 five-passenger airliner
- Boeing 73 airliner
- Boeing 74 XF3B-1
- Boeing 75
- Boeing 76 F2B-1 modified with metal wings and rod aileron control
- Boeing 77 F3B-1 (production version of Model 74)
- Boeing 78 two-seat fighter
- Boeing 79 bomber/torpedo/scout aircraft
- Boeing 80 18-seat trimotor airliner
- Boeing 81 XN2B-1
- Boeing 82 six-passenger trimotor biplane airliner
- Boeing 83 XF4B-1
- Boeing 84 US Army ground attack aircraft
- Boeing 85 three-engine patrol flying boat
- Boeing 86 US Army primary trainer
- Boeing 87 three-seat mailplane
- Boeing 88 mailplane (new design)
- Boeing 89 XF4B-1
- Boeing 90 US Army pursuit
- Boeing 91 Model 83 with metal frame wings
- Boeing 92 F3B with Handley-Page slot wings
- Boeing 93 XP-7
- Boeing 94 two-seat USN aircraft
- Boeing 95 mailplane
- Boeing 96 XP-9
- Boeing 97 XFB-5
- Boeing 98 US Army pursuit
- Boeing 99 F4B-1
- Boeing 100 civil version of F4B-1
- Boeing 101 XP-12A
- Boeing 102 P-12
- Boeing 200 mailplane
- Boeing 201 cabin monoplane
- Boeing 202 XP-15
- Boeing 203 two-seat sport/training aircraft (redesigned Model 81)
- Boeing 204 four-seat flying boat (B1E)
- Boeing 205 XF5B-1
- Boeing 206 two-seat pursuit for US Army competition
- Boeing 207 all-metal amphibian
- Boeing 208 USN flying boat with Model 80 wings
- Boeing 209 scaled down PB-1 (P2B-1)
- Boeing 210 airliner version of Model 200
- Boeing 211 light pursuit aircraft
- Boeing 212 hypothetical US Army pursuit
- Boeing 213
- Boeing 214 Y1B-9
- Boeing 215 YB-9
- Boeing 216 bomber study
- Boeing 217 bomber study
- Boeing 218 redesigned P-12B with monocoque body
- Boeing 219 preliminary pursuits (six models study)
- Boeing 220 1000 hp pursuit with experimental Pratt & Whitney engine
- Boeing 221 Model 200 modified for 4, 6, or 8 passengers
- Boeing 222 (1931) P-12C
- Boeing 222 tilt-prop project based on Mitsubishi Mu-2
- Boeing 223 F4B-2
- Boeing 224 first pre-P-26 monoplane fighter project
- Boeing 225 pre-P-26 monoplane fighter project
- Boeing 226 Model 80A conversion for Standard Oil
- Boeing 227 P-12D
- Boeing 228 as P-12D except with drawer-type ammunition boxes
- Boeing 229 trimotor transport study
- Boeing 230 cancelled; not used
- Boeing 231 production version of Model 221 (5 passengers, lengthened fuselage)
- Boeing 232 interception biplane fighter
- Boeing 233 USN monoplane scout
- Boeing 234 P-12E
- Boeing 235 F4B-3
- Boeing 236 XF6B
- Boeing 237 Model 232 redesigned (for US Army maneuverable pursuit)
- Boeing 238 trimotor monoplane transport study
- Boeing 239 trimotor biplane transport study
- Boeing 240 low-wing, internally braced monoplane pursuit study, US Army
- Boeing 241 1000 hp biplane pursuit
- Boeing 242 four-engine transport proposal
- Boeing 243 twin-engine monoplane transport study (800 hp engine)
- Boeing 244 redesigned Model 240
- Boeing 245 second pre-P-26 monoplane fighter design
- Boeing 246 Y1B-9A
- Boeing 247 twin-engine, 10-seat airliner
- Boeing 248 P-26
- Boeing 249 USN speed - service parasol monoplane
- Boeing 250 USN speed - low-wing monoplane
- Boeing 251 P-12F
- Boeing 252 biplane - USN speed design
- Boeing 253 high-wing monoplane - USN speed design
- Boeing 254 mid-wing, wire-braced monoplane - USN speed design
- Boeing 255 low-wing, internally braced - USN speed design
- Boeing 256 F4B-4 for Brazil
- Boeing 257 new transport
- Boeing 258 torpedo design study
- Boeing 259 two-seat pursuit - geared 1535, US Army
- Boeing 260 USN proposal - Spec. #112-3 - two-seat fighter
- Boeing 261 F4B-5 (cancelled)
- Boeing 262 USN special VF small two-row biplane
- Boeing 263 USN special VF small two-row high-wing monoplane
- Boeing 264 P-29
- Boeing 265 single-engine, two-seat fighter, US Army
- Boeing 266 P-26
- Boeing 267 export version of P-12 for Brazil with F4B-3 fuselage and P-12E wings
- Boeing 268 USN pursuit studies - biplane
- Boeing 269 USN pursuit studies - biplane
- Boeing 270 USN pursuit studies - biplane
- Boeing 271 USN pursuit studies - biplane
- Boeing 272 USN pursuit studies - monoplane
- Boeing 273 XF7B-1
- Boeing 274 USN pursuit studies - monoplane
- Boeing 275 USN pursuit studies - monoplane
- Boeing 276 B-9B (cancelled)
- Boeing 277 US Army special high-speed pursuit, Wasp Junior engine
- Boeing 278 XP-32
- Boeing 279 YP-32
- Boeing 280 original proposal for the 247 with 14 seats and Hornet engines
- Boeing 281 P-26A for export
- Boeing 282 USN single-engine carrier bomber
- Boeing 283 single-engine mailplane
- Boeing 284 twin-engine multi-seat fighter
- Boeing 285 P-34 (cancelled)
- Boeing 286 new US Army bomber - resembling the 247
- Boeing 287 USN biplane fighter
- Boeing 288 Y1B-9A for export
- Boeing 289 2nd 289-A (biplane preliminary study combined torpedo and bombing USN proposal; VB-VT Spec. SD-119-3
- Boeing 290 new airliner for United Air Lines
- Boeing 291 preliminary study - USN 2-seat scout - 1535 geared engine
- Boeing 292 preliminary study - Army Corps observation - 1535 geared engine
- Boeing 293 preliminary study - USN single-seat fighter - 1535 geared engine
- Boeing 294 XBLR-1/XB-15
- Boeing 295 US Army bomber
- Boeing 296 USN single-seat fighter - proposed spec SD-112-5
- Boeing 297 YP-29
- Boeing 298 nothing known
- Boeing 299 XB-17
  - Boeing 299B YB-17
  - Boeing 299E/299M B-17B
  - Boeing 299F YB-17A
  - Boeing 299H B-17D
  - Boeing 299J proposed B-17 derivative with tricycle landing gear, shoulder-mounted wings and B-24 like fuselage
  - Boeing 299-O B-17E
  - Boeing 299P B-17F, B-17G
  - Boeing 299Z B-17G modified as a testbed for turboprops
- Boeing 300 original proposal of the 307; basically a four-engine 247
- Boeing 301 two-seat pursuit
- Boeing 302 flying boat for US Navy
- Boeing 303 P-12E except with SE engine and brazier head rivets in body
  - Boeing 303A as Model 303 but with wing tanks
- Boeing 304 as Model 303 but with the fabric covered steel tube fuselage of the P-12C
  - Boeing 304A as Model 304 but with wing tank
- Boeing 305 VPB type - 4 engine USN flying boat
- Boeing 306 tailless aircraft studies
- Boeing 307
- Boeing 308 six-seat inline air-cooled engine - transport study
- Boeing 309 large size tr. bomber
- Boeing 310 defensive weapon - preliminary study
- Boeing 311 observation aircraft - preliminary study
- Boeing 312 small twin-engine amphibian
- Boeing 314
- Boeing 315 VB-VT study
- Boeing 316 XB-15 derived airliner project for KLM
- Boeing 316B long-range heavy bomber derivative of the 316
- Boeing 316D Y1B-20
- Boeing 317 twin-engine trainer
- Boeing 318 mid-wing monoplane transport
- Boeing 319 patrol derivative of 314
- Boeing 320 six-engine, twin-hull flying boat
- Boeing 321 twin-engine patrol flying boat
- Boeing 322 pressurized tricycle B-17, B-17 wings and tail; precursor of B-29
- Boeing 323 four-engine passenger flying boat
- Boeing 324 patrol derivative of the 314
- Boeing 325 four-engine, high-wing transport
- Boeing 326 pressurized six-engine transatlantic double-deck flying boat for Pan Am
- Boeing 327 four-engine flying boat for Pan Am
- Boeing 328 six-engine airliner for Pan Am
- Boeing 329 twin-engine attack aircraft
- Boeing 330 six-engine, very long range heavy bomber
- Boeing 331 high-speed twin-engine attack aircraft with V-1710 engines
- Boeing 332 high-speed twin-engine attack aircraft with V-3420 engines
- Boeing 333 pre-B-29 project with V-1710 engines in push-pull pairs
- Boeing 333A as 333 but with V-1710 engines in tractor configuration buried in the wing
- Boeing 333B as 333A but with H-2420 engines in tractor configuration buried in the wing
- Boeing 334 pressurized tricycle B-17
- Boeing 334A improved 334
- Boeing 335 single-engine observation aircraft for USN
- Boeing 336 single-engine observation aircraft for USN
- Boeing 337 twin-engine patrol flying boat
- Boeing 338 single-engine fighter
- Boeing 339 three-engine fighter
- Boeing 340 twin-engine fighter
- Boeing 341 pre-B-29 project; improved 334A with R-2800 engines
- Boeing 342 twin-engine patrol utility amphibian
- Boeing 343 twin-engine torpedo bomber
- Boeing 344 XPBB Sea Ranger
- Boeing 345 B-29
- Boeing 345-2 B-50
- Boeing 346 four-engine high-altitude, very long-range heavy bomber
- Boeing 348 single-engine, high-wing monoplane fighter
- Boeing 349 twin-engine dive bomber
- Boeing 350 XPBB with four single-stage, two-speed R-2800 engines
- Boeing 351 XPBB with four two-stage, two-speed R-2800 engines
- Boeing 352 twin-engine carrier-based fighter with R-2000 engines
- Boeing 353 XPBB with four single-stage, two-speed R-2600 engines
- Boeing 354 XPBB with four two-stage, two-speed R-2600 engines
- Boeing 355 XPBB with center wing tanks and armor
- Boeing 356 twin-engine fighter for USAAC
- Boeing 357 XPBB with four fuel tanks
- Boeing 358 as 353 but without armor
- Boeing 359 as 353 but with four fuel tanks
- Boeing 360 (1941) four-engine, twin-boom, global range flying wing heavy bomber with pusher engines
- Boeing 361 high-altitude, global range four-engine heavy bomber with R-4360 engines
- Boeing 362 eight-engine, global range flying wing heavy bomber
- Boeing 363 six-engine, twin-boom, blended wing body global range heavy bomber
- Boeing 364 XPBB with two R-4360 engines
- Boeing 365 four-engine, global range heavy bomber with pusher engines
- Boeing 366 cargo/troop transport with 307 fuselage and B-17E wings
- Boeing 367 C-97 Stratofreighter
  - Boeing 367-76 KC-97 Stratofreighter
- Boeing 367-60 C-97 derivative with four T34 turboprops and gull wings
- Boeing 367-64 C-97 derivative with four J57 turbojets in podded pairs and swept wings
- Boeing 367-64-60 minelayer for USN with four J40 turbojets
- Boeing 367-80 prototype jetliner
- Boeing 367-86 two KC-97Gs with T34 turboprops
- Boeing 368 carrier-based fighter studies
- Boeing 369 high-altitude, pressurized version of the B-17
- Boeing 370 as 365 but with four R-4360s in tractor configuration
- Boeing 371 cargo version of the XPBB
- Boeing 372 XPBB with two R-4360 engines
- Boeing 373 (1942) six-engine global range heavy bomber with R-4360 engines
- Boeing 374 twin-engine torpedo carrier, similar spec as the Grumman F7F
- Boeing 375 single-engine carrier-based fighter
- Boeing 376 (1942) single-engine carrier-based fighter
- Boeing 377
- Boeing 378 submarine patrol version of the AT-15
- Boeing 379 unmanned radio-control torpedo armed version of the AT-15
- Boeing 380 as 378 but with R-1830 engines
- Boeing 381 four-engine cargo aircraft converted from B-17F; pre-XB-36 competition
- Boeing 382 four-engine cargo flying boat converted from 314 series
- Boeing 384 four-engine, long-range bomber project; B-29 derivative
- Boeing 385 six-engine, long-range bomber project
- Boeing 386 six-engine bomber
- Boeing 390 fighter project, competitor of Vought F5U
- Boeing 391 fighter project, competitor of Vought F5U
- Boeing 396 fighter project, competitor of Vought F5U
- Boeing 399 single-seat, pancake wing, tailless fighter project
- Boeing 400 XF8B
- Boeing 401 two-seat helicopter project
- Boeing 404 six-engine pusher flying-wing bomber
- Boeing 417 post World War II feeder liner design, never built
- Boeing 424 pre-B-47 project: a B-29 with two turbojets in nacelles placed above (1943-44)
- Boeing 431-16 high-wing transport project with two Pratt & Whitney Double Wasp engines
- Boeing 431-16 high-wing transport project with Wright Cyclone engine
- Boeing 432 pre-B-47 light bomber project: 4 jets in fuselage, engines on top of aft fuselage (1944)
- Boeing 440
- Boeing 448 initial B-47 project: swept-wing, 6 jets in fuselage (1945)
- Boeing 449 jet interceptor project
- Boeing 450 B-47
- Boeing 451 YL-15
- Boeing 452 B-47 variants
- Boeing 454 USN jet fighter project
- Boeing 455 USN night fighter project
- Boeing 457 interceptor-fighter ramjet project
- Boeing 458 competitor to the XP-92, project
- Boeing 459 USN fighter project
- Boeing 461 design involved in B-52 competition
- Boeing 462 bomber project with propeller-driven engines; winner of B-52 design competition
- Boeing 464 B-52 and all preliminary designs
- Boeing 466 XP3B
- Boeing 473 pre-707 airliner projects derived from B-47 and B-52
- Boeing 474 first B-55 bomber project for USAF with four T40 engines
- Boeing 479 second B-55 project for USAF
- Boeing 481 bomber developed from B-52
- Boeing 482 USN "penetration" fighter (OS-112)
- Boeing 483 large jet bomber
- Boeing 484 jet bomber
- Boeing 486 seaplane fighter; Boeing's last flying boat
- Boeing 490 ASW project competing with S2F; same wings and tail as XF8B
- Boeing 495 USAF transport project competing with C-130
- Boeing 701 XB-59
- Boeing 702 MX-1847 and MX-2145 proposals
- Boeing 704 VP Class VP (HL) minelayer landplane to OS-128
- Boeing 707
  - Boeing 707-120
  - Boeing 707-120B
  - Boeing 707-138 707-120 for Qantas
  - Boeing 707-220
  - Boeing 707-320 Intercontinental
  - Boeing 707-320B
  - Boeing 707-320C
  - Boeing 707-420
  - Boeing 707-620 proposed stretched variant of 707-320B for domestic use; cancelled in favor of 747
  - Boeing 707-700 testbed for CFM56 turbofan
  - Boeing 707-820 proposed stretched variant of 707-320B for intercontinental use; cancelled in favor of 747
  - Boeing 707 Phalcon/Condor
- Boeing 708 5-seat, four-engine supersonic bomber project
- Boeing 712 proposal for WS-202A LRI competition
- Boeing 713 first proposal for WS-110
- Boeing 717 Stratotanker
- Boeing 717 (MD-95)
- Boeing 720
- Boeing 722 alternate WS-110 proposal for USAF?
- Boeing 724 WS-110 weapon system project designs
- Boeing 725 WS-110A weapon system project designs
- Boeing 727
  - Boeing 727-100
  - Boeing 727-200
  - Boeing 727-257 early study with two engines on each side of fuselage and behind the wing
  - Boeing 727-264C early study with two engines mounted on aft fuselage and with speed capsules for increased Mach number
  - Boeing 727-265 early study
  - Boeing 727-300 projected increased capacity version
  - Boeing 727-474 design study, basically a four-engine version of 727-264C
  - Boeing 727-475 design study, basically a scaled down 720
- Boeing 728 possibly a proposal for the RoBo program
- Boeing 729 possibly for a series of UTX or UCX proposals
- Boeing 730 SEV proposals
- Boeing 731 transport proposal to SOR-182/SS-476L
- Boeing 733 military and civil supersonic designs
- Boeing 735 swing-tail freighter derived from the 707
- Boeing 737
  - Boeing 737-100
  - Boeing 737-200
  - Boeing 737-300
  - Boeing 737-400
  - Boeing 737-500
  - Boeing 737-600
  - Boeing 737-700
  - Boeing 737-800
  - Boeing 737-900
- Boeing 738 military version of Model 735
- Boeing 739 RC-135
- Boeing 742 variable sweep wing airliner project
- Boeing 747
  - Boeing 747 Supertanker
  - Boeing 747-3 double-deck derivative of C-5A proposal
  - Boeing 747-4 shorter double-deck derivative of C-5A proposal
  - Boeing 747-5 longer double-deck derivative of C-5A proposal
  - Boeing 747-8 (formerly 747 Advanced)
  - Boeing 747-8F
  - Boeing 747-100
  - Boeing 747-200
  - Boeing 747-300 proposed trijet version of 747, not related to production 747-300
  - Boeing 747-300
  - Boeing 747-400
  - Boeing 747-500X proposed extended range variant
  - Boeing 747-600X 747X Stretch
  - Boeing 747-700X proposed extended range variant
  - Boeing 747SP
  - Boeing 747 Dreamlifter
- Boeing 751 STOL transport designs, developed with Aeritalia
- Boeing 752 long-range trijet project with overwing/overfin nacelles
- Boeing 753 two-stream augmentor wing STOL aircraft developed from Model 751
- Boeing 754 Burnelli-type transport project
- Boeing 755 trijet airliner project
- Boeing 757
  - Boeing 757-200
  - Boeing 757-300
- Boeing 757-227 early t-tail trijet proposal, not related to later 757 series
- Boeing 759 series of unconventional transport designs
- Boeing 761 airliner studies
- Boeing 763 747 developments
- Boeing 765 N+3 and SUGAR developments
- Boeing 767
  - Boeing 767 LuxuryLiner
  - Boeing 767-200
  - Boeing 767-200ER
  - Boeing 767-300
  - Boeing 767-300ER
  - Boeing 767-300F
  - Boeing 767-400ER
  - Boeing 767-400ERX
  - Boeing 767-X
  - Boeing 767-XR
  - Boeing E-767
  - Boeing KC-767
- Boeing 768 twin-engine jet transport designs
- Boeing 777
  - Boeing 777-200
  - Boeing 777-200ER
  - Boeing 777-200LR
  - Boeing 777-300
  - Boeing 777-300ER
  - Boeing 777F
  - Boeing 777X
  - Boeing 777-8
  - Boeing 777-9
- Boeing 787
  - Boeing 787-3
  - Boeing 787-8
  - Boeing 787-9
  - Boeing 787-10
- Boeing 789 7J7 designs
- Boeing New Midsize Airplane
- Boeing 7E7
- Boeing 7J7 (cancelled)
- Boeing Model 908-909
- Boeing 953 YC-14
- Boeing 2707 (cancelled)
- Boeing YAL-1
- Boeing A7-BAO
- Boeing AT-3
- Boeing B-9
- Boeing XB-15
- Boeing B-17 Flying Fortress
- Boeing Y1B-20
- Boeing B-29 Superfortress
- Boeing XB-38 Flying Fortress
- Boeing XB-39 Superfortress
- Boeing B-40 Flying Fortress
- Boeing B-44 Superfortress
- Boeing B-47 Stratojet
- Boeing B-50 Superfortress
- Boeing B-52 Stratofortress
- Boeing B-54
- Boeing XB-55
- Boeing B-56
- Boeing XB-59
- Boeing BLR-1
- Boeing BFB
- Boeing BQ-7
- Boeing YC-14
- Boeing C-17 Globemaster III
- Boeing C-18 Monomail
- Boeing C-18
- Boeing C-19
- Boeing C-22
- Boeing VC-25
- Boeing C-32
- Boeing C-33
- Boeing C-40 Clipper
- Boeing KC-46
- Boeing KC-135R/751
- Boeing C-73
- Boeing C-75
- Boeing C-97 Stratofreighter
- Boeing KC-97 Stratofreighter
- Boeing C-98
- Boeing C-105
- Boeing C-108 Flying Fortress
- Boeing C-127
- Boeing C-135 Stratolifter
  - Boeing KC-135 Stratotanker
  - Boeing EC-135
  - Boeing RC-135
- Boeing C-137 Stratoliner
  - VC-137C SAM 26000
  - VC-137C SAM 27000
- Boeing CO-7
- Boeing E-3 Sentry
- Boeing E-4
- Boeing E4B Nightwatch
- Boeing E-6 Mercury
- Boeing E-10 MC2A
- Boeing F-9
- Boeing F-18 Super Hornet
- Boeing FB
- Boeing F2B
- Boeing F3B Seahawk
- Boeing F4B
- Boeing F5B
- Boeing F6B
- Boeing F7B
- Boeing F8B
- Boeing GA-1
- Boeing GA-2
- Boeing AH-64 Apache
- Boeing HRB
- Boeing L-15 Scout
- Boeing LHR-DOH
- Boeing NB
- Boeing N2B
- Boeing OB
- Boeing O2B
- Boeing XP-4
- Boeing XP-7
- Boeing XP-8
- Boeing X-8A Poseidon
- Boeing XP-9
- Boeing P-12
- Boeing XP-15
- Boeing P-26 Peashooter
- Boeing P-29
- Boeing P-32
- Boeing XP-925
- Boeing XP-936
- Boeing XP-940
- Boeing PB
- Boeing PB-1W Flying Fortress
- Boeing PB Flying Fortress
- Boeing P2B
- Boeing P3B
- Boeing PB2B Catalina
- Boeing PBB Sea Ranger
- Boeing PW-9
- Boeing T-43
- Boeing/BAE Systems T-45 Goshawk
- Boeing TB
- Boeing X-20 Dyna-Soar
- Boeing X-32
- Boeing X-37 Future-X
- Boeing X-40
- Boeing X-43
- Boeing X-45
- Boeing X-46
- Boeing X-48
- Boeing X-50
- Boeing X-53 Active Aeroelastic Wing
- B & W Seaplane
- Boeing AXB
- Boeing Navy Experimental Type B Carrier Fighter
- Boeing A-213 Totem - see List of aircraft (Bf–Bo)#Boeing Aircraft of Canada
- Boeing BB-1
- Boeing BB-L6
- Boeing Bird of Prey
- Boeing BX
- Boeing Business Jet
- Boeing C-204 Thunderbird - see List of aircraft (Bf–Bo)#Boeing Aircraft of Canada
- Boeing C-700
- Boeing CC-137 Husky Canadian Armed Forces
- Boeing CL-4S
- Boeing Courier
- Boeing DH-4M
- Boeing Dreamlifter
- Boeing E-767
- Boeing EA
- Boeing GA-1
- Boeing GA-2
- Boeing NLA
- Boeing Pelican
- Boeing Phantom Ray
- Boeing QSRA
- Boeing Skyfox
- Boeing Sonic Cruiser
- Boeing T-7 Red Hawk
- Boeing SLV Stage 1 (supersonic reusable launch vehicle)
- Boeing SLV Stage 2 (hypersoinic, scramjet-powered reusable launch vehicle)
- Boeing Airpower Teaming System
- Boeing Wedgetail

=== Boeing-Stearman ===
- Boeing-Stearman Model X-70
- Boeing-Stearman Model 75
- Boeing-Stearman Model 76
- Boeing-Stearman Model X-85
- Boeing-Stearman Model 88
- Boeing-Stearman Model X-90
- Boeing-Stearman Model X-91
- Boeing-Stearman Model X-100
- Boeing-Stearman Model X-120
- Boeing-Stearman XA-21
- Boeing-Stearman XAT-15
- Boeing-Stearman XBT-17
- Boeing-Stearman PT-13 Kaydet
- Boeing-Stearman PT-17 Kaydet
- Boeing-Stearman PT-18
- Boeing-Stearman PT-27

=== Boeing-Vertol ===
- Boeing-Vertol 107
- Boeing-Vertol 107-II
- Boeing-Vertol 114
- Boeing-Vertol 165
- Boeing-Vertol 173
- Boeing-Vertol 176
- Boeing-Vertol 179
- Boeing-Vertol 219
- Boeing-Vertol 234
- Boeing-Vertol 301
- Boeing-Vertol 347
- Boeing-Vertol 352
- Boeing-Vertol 360
- Boeing-Vertol 414
- Boeing-Vertol H-46 Sea Knight
- Boeing-Vertol H-47 Chinook
- Boeing-Vertol H-61
- Boeing-Vertol H-62
- Boeing-Vertol HC-1A
- Boeing-Vertol HC-1B
- Boeing-Vertol HLH
- Boeing-Vertol HRB
- Boeing-Vertol Commercial Chinook
- Boeing-Vertol CH-113 Labrador Canadian Armed Forces
- Boeing-Vertol CH-147 Chinook Canadian Armed Forces
- Boeing-Vertol YUH-61

=== Boeing Aircraft of Canada ===
- Boeing-Canada C-204 Thunderbird
- Boeing-Canada 40H-4
- Boeing-Canada A-213 Totem
- Boeing-Canada PB2B-1
- Boeing-Canada PB2B-2

=== Boeing School of Aeronautics ===
- Boeing School T-5
- Boeing School T-6

=== Boeing-Sikorsky ===
- Boeing-Sikorsky RAH-66 Comanche

=== Bogardus ===
(George Bogardus, Troutdale OR, and Eyerly Aircraft Corp, Salem, OR)

- Bogardus Little Gee Bee

=== Bogut ===
(Ed L. Bogut, Havre, MT)

- Bogut Model A

=== Bohannon ===
(Bruce Bohannon)

- Bohannon B-1

=== Bohatyrew ===
(Michal Bohatyrew)

- Bohatyrew Kaczka-Nadzieja (Kaczka-Nadzieja - Duck-the Hope / canard)sic

=== Bohemia ===
- Bohemia B-5

=== Boillon ===
(Jean Boillon)

- Boillon JAB.60 Fulmo

=== Boisavia ===
(Société Boisavia)

- Boisavia B-50 Muscadet
- Boisavia B-60 Mercurey
- Boisavia B-80 Chablis
- Boisavia B-260 Anjou

=== BOK ===
(Byuro Osovikh Konstruktskii - experimental aircraft design bureau)

- Chizhevski BOK-1
- Krichyevskii BOK-2
- BOK-3
- Chizhevski BOK-5
- BOK-6
- BOK-7
- BOK-8
- BOK-11
- BOK-15
- BOK SS
- BOK RK
- BOK TB

=== Bokor ===
(Maurice Bokor (also seen as Morris Boker), Bronx, NY)

- Bokor 1909 triplane

=== Boland ===
((Frank E & Joseph) Boland Aeroplane & Motor Co, Rahway, NJ and Mineola, NY, 1928: Boland Aeroplane Co, Newark, NJ)

- Boland Tailless Triplane
- Boland 1911 Tailless Biplane
- Boland 1911 Conventional Biplane
- Boland 1912 Tailless Biplane
- Boland 1912 Tailless Flying Boat
- Boland 1914 Monoplane Flying Boat
- Boland 1914 Biplane Flying Boat

=== Bolkhovitinov ===
- Bolkhovitinov DB-A
- Bolkhovitinov DB-2A
- Bolkhovitinov TK-1
- Bolkhovitinov DBA
- Bolkhovitinov BDD
- Bolkhovitinov S
- Bolkhovitinov I
- Bolkhovitinov D
- Bolkhovitinov BBS
- Bolkhovitinov BB
- Bolkhovitinov LB-S
- Bolkhovitinov SSS

=== Bölkow ===
- Bölkow Bö 46
- Bölkow Bö 102
- Bölkow Bö 103
- Bölkow Bö 104
- Bölkow Bö 105
- Bölkow Bö 106
- Bölkow Bö 108
- Bölkow Bö 207
- Bölkow Bö 208 Junior
- Bölkow Bö 209 Monsun
- Bölkow Bö 214
- Bölkow Phoebus
- Bölkow P-166/3 Flying Jeep

=== Bollinger-Koppen ===
(Lynn L Bollinger-Otto C Koppen, MIT, Cambridge, MA)

- Bollinger-Koppen Helioplane 1
- Bollinger-Koppen Helioplane 2
- Bollinger-Koppen Helioplane 4

=== Bolte ===
(Bolte Aircraft Co, Des Moines, IA)

- Bolte Limousine
- Bolte LW-1
- Bolte LW-2 Sportplane
- Bolte LW-3 Coupe
- Bolte LW-4

=== Bolz ===
(William H Bolz Jr, Palmyra, NE)

- Bolz BB-1
- Bolz BB-2
- Bolz BB-3

=== Bombardier ===
- Bombardier 415
- Bombardier BD-100
- Bombardier BD-700
- Bombardier Challenger 300
- Bombardier Challenger 310
- Bombardier Challenger 350
- Bombardier Challenger 604
- Bombardier Challenger 605
- Bombardier Challenger 650
- Bombardier Challenger 750
- Bombardier Challenger 800
- Bombardier CL-215
- Bombardier CL-415
- Bombardier CRJ-100
- Bombardier CRJ-200
- Bombardier CRJ-440
- Bombardier CRJ-700
- Bombardier CRJ-705
- Bombardier CRJ-900
- Bombardier CRJ-900LR
- Bombardier CRJ-1000
- Bombardier CSeries
- Bombardier Dash-8 Turbocharger
- Bombardier Global 5000
- Bombardier Global 5500
- Bombardier Global 6000
- Bombardier Global 6500
- Bombardier Global 7500
- Bombardier Global 8000
- Bombardier Global Express XRS
- Bombardier Global Express
- Bombardier Learjet 55
- Bombardier Learjet 60
- Bombardier Learjet 70
- Bombardier Learjet 75
- Bombardier Sentinel
- Bombardier BRJX

=== Bomhoff ===
(Bomhoff, Canada County, OK)

- Bomhoff biplane

=== Bonbrake ===
(L. Dewey Bonbrake, Kansas City, KS)

- Bonbrake Parasol

=== Boncourt-Audenis-Jacob ===
(Monsieur Boncourt, Charles Audenis & Jean Jacob)

- B.A.J. IVC.2 (Type IV)

=== Bond ===
(John Bond, Cupertino, CA)

- Bond Sky Dancer

=== Bone ===
(R.O. Bone Co., 415 E Industrial Ave, Inglewood, CA)

- Bone P-1
- ROBC Sport
- Bone Golden Eagles
- Bone Parasol P-2

=== Bonnel ===
(André Bonnel)

- Aile volante Bonnel

=== Bonnet-Labranche ===
(Albert et Emile Bonnet-Labranche)

- Bonnet-Labranche No.1
- Bonnet-Labranche No.2
- Bonnet-Labranche No.3
- Bonnet-Labranche No.4 1909 monoplane
- Bonnet-Labranche No.5 1910 biplane
- Bonnet-Labranche No.6
- Bonnet-Labranche No.7
- Bonnet-Labranche No.8

=== Bonney ===
(Leonard Warden Bonney, Wellington, OH)

- Bonney Gull

=== Bonomi ===
See: Aeronautica Bonomi

=== Booker ===
(Carr E. Booker, Raleigh, NC)

- Booker Hummingbird

=== Boom ===
(Boom Technology)

- Boom XB-1 Baby Boom
- Boom Supersonic

=== Booth ===
(H.T. Booth. Freeport, NY)

- Booth 1931 biplane

=== Bopp ===
(Cecil W Bopp, Waterloo, IA)

- Bopp PM-1

=== Borchers ===
(Lowell J. Borchers, Mt Vernon, OH)

- Borchers Delta Stingray

=== Bordoni ===
- Bordoni BGM.2

=== Borel ===
(see also: SGCIM) (Etablissements Borel / Gabriel borel)

- Borel 1910 monoplane
- Borel 1911 1-seat monoplane
- Borel 1911 2-seat monoplane
- Borel 1911 2-seat metal monoplane
- Borel 1911 military monoplane
- Borel 1912 L'Obus monoplane
- Borel 1912 1-seat monoplane
- Borel 1912 2-seat monoplane
- Borel 1912 2-seat monoplane (2) cowled gnome engine & balanced elevators
- Borel 1912 2-seat floatplane simple 4-strut float supports
- Borel 1912 2-seat floatplane (2) double diagonal float strut bracing
- Borel 1912 2-seat floatplane (3) wing root l/e cutouts
- Borel 1912 2-seat amphibian
- Borel 1913 1-seat monoplane fully covered
- Borel 1913 2-seat monoplane no cross axle
- Borel 1913 2-seat floatplane N-strut float supports + cutouts
- Borel 1913 military monoplane
- Borel Chemet 2-seater monoplane (No.7 at Paris-Deauville)
- Borel Chemet 2-seater monoplane (2) (No.10 Type Tamise)
- Borel Védrines 1-seat monoplane
- Borel Mestach 1-seat monoplane
- Borel-Ruby Torpille pusher monoplane
- Borel Bo.11
- Borel C1
- Borel C2 (Type 3000)
- Borel Aeroyacht type Denhaut I
- Borel Aeroyacht type Denhaut II
- Borel Aeroyacht type Denhaut III
- Borel type Monaco
- Borel-Odier BO-T
- Borel-Odier BO-C
- Borel-Boccacio Type 3000 (C2)
- Borel racer

=== Borgward ===
- Borgward BFK-1 Kolibri

=== Borodics ===
- Borodics Lurko

=== Borovkov-Florov ===
- Borovkov-Florov 7211
- Borovkov-Florov I-207
- Borovkov-Florov I-207/M-63
- Borovkov-Florov D

=== Borucki ===
(Stefan Borucki)

- Borucki monoplane
- Borucki biplane

=== Borzecki ===
(Jozef Borzecki)

- Borzecki Alto-Stratus

=== Bosch ===
- Bosch eGyro

=== Bosshardt ===
(Harry Bosshardt, 1850 Sacramento St, San Francisco, CA.

- Bosshardt HB-1

=== BOT Aircraft ===
(Oerlinghausen, Germany)

- BOT SC07 Speed Cruiser

=== Botali-du-Riveau ===
- Botali-du-Riveau P.A.M.A. Type 1

=== Botali-Mandelli ===
- Botali-Mandelli Avionette

=== Bottoms ===
(Leonard L. Bottoms Jr., Quinton, VA)

- Bottoms Skeeter

=== Bouchard ===
(André Bouchard)

- Bouchard le Météque

=== Boudeau ===
- Boudeau MB.10
- Boudeau MB.16

=== Bouffort-Lantres ===
(Bouffort & Gérard Lantres) (see also:Lantres-Bouffort)

- Bouffort-Lantres BL.10

=== Boulton Paul ===
(Boulton & Paul Ltd, Boulton Paul Aircraft)

- Boulton & Paul Phoenix II
- Boulton & Paul P.3 Bobolink
- Boulton & Paul P.6
- Boulton & Paul P.7 Bourges
- Boulton & Paul P.8 Atlantic
- Boulton Paul P.9
- Boulton Paul P.10
- Boulton & Paul P.11 (Specification Type XXI)
- Boulton & Paul P.12 Bodmin
- Boulton & Paul P.15 Bolton
- Boulton & Paul P.25 Bugle
- Boulton & Paul P.29 Sidestrand
- Boulton & Paul P.31 Bittern
- Boulton & Paul P.32
- Boulton & Paul P.33 Partridge
- Boulton & Paul P.64 Mailplane
- Boulton & Paul P.71A
- Boulton & Paul P.75 Overstrand
- Boulton & Paul P.79
- Boulton Paul P.82 Defiant
- Boulton Paul P.90
- Boulton Paul P.92 - not built
- Boulton Paul P.92/2
- Boulton & Paul P.93 - internal designation for Blackburn Roc production by BP
- Boulton Paul P.96 - proposal to specification F.18/40 - single engine
- Boulton Paul P.97 - proposal to specification F.18/40 - twin engined
- Boulton Paul P.99 - proposal to specification F.6/42
- Boulton Paul P.105 - naval torpedo-bomber
- Boulton Paul P.107 - proposal for long range fighter
- Boulton Paul P.108 Balliol - to specification T.7/45
- Boulton Paul P.111
- Boulton Paul P.113 - proposal for supersonic research aircraft
- Boulton Paul P.119 - proposal for jet trainer (lost to de Havilland Vampire T.11)
- Boulton Paul P.120
- Boulton Paul P.121
- Boulton Paul P.122
- Boulton Paul P.124 - jet trainer (lost to Hunting Percival Jet Provost)
- Boulton Paul P.146 - Proposed VTOL airliner.

=== Bounsall ===
((Edward & Curtis) Bounsall Aircraft, Mesquite, NV)

- Bounsall Prospector
- Bounsall Super Prospector

=== Bourdon ===
((Allen P) Bourdon Aircraft Corp, E Greenwich, RI, 1930: Merged with Viking Flying Boat Co.)

- Bourdon Kitty Hawk
- Bourdon B-2 Kittyhawk
- Bourdon B-4 Kittyhawk

=== Bourgois-Sénémaud ===
(Paul Bourgois with Sénémaud as engineer and Deckert as test pilot at a workshop in Levallois-Perret)

- Bourgois-Sénémaud 10
- Bourgois-Sénémaud AT.1
- Bourgois-Sénémaud AT.35
- Bourgois-Sénémaud AT.40
- Bourgois-Sénémaud BT
- Bourgois AM 50

=== Bourn ===
(Clarence H. Bourn, Dallas, TX)

- Bourn B-1

=== Bouvet-de Rougé ===
(Marcel Bouvet and Charles de Rougé)

- Bouvet-de Rougé Elion

=== Bowers ===
(Peter M Bowers, Seattle, WA)

- Bowers Fly Baby
- Bowers Bi-Baby
- Bowers Namu II

=== Bowlby ===
((Richard "Dick") Bowlby Airplane Company, 1510 N Fairview and 413 S Market St, Wichita, KS)

- Bowlby Sunbeam

=== Bowlus ===
- Bowlus 1-S-2100
- Bowlus BA-100 Baby Albatross
- Bowlus BS-100 Super Albatross
- Bowlus SP-1 Paper Wing
- Bowlus/Nelson BB-1 Dragonfly

=== Bowman ===
(Elmer Bowman, Owatonna, MN)

- Bowman 1930 monoplane
- Bowman 1940 biplane

=== Bowyer ===
(Jack B. Bowyer, Wichita, KS)

- Bowyer BW-1

=== Boyd ===
(Chester M & W Hunter Boyd, Logan Field, Baltimore, MD)

- Boyd Flying Craft Model A
- Boyd Flying Craft Model C

=== Boyer ===
(Francois Boyer)

- Boyer BF.01
- Boyer BF.02
- Boyer B.II

=== Boyd ===
(Gary Boyd)

- Boyd G.B.1
