= S62 =

S62 may refer to:

== Aircraft ==
- Blériot-SPAD S.62, a French biplane trainer
- Savoia-Marchetti S.62, an Italian flying boat
- Sikorsky S-62, an American helicopter

== Rail and bus ==
- S62 (Long Island bus), United States
- S62 (New York City bus) serving Staten Island, United States
- S62, a Schaffhausen S-Bahn railway service in Switzerland and Germany

== Other uses ==
- S62 (star), in the constellation Sagittarius
- BMW S62, an automobile engine
- German ship Falke (S62), a fast attack craft
- INS Sindhuvijay (S62), a submarine of the Indian Navy
- S62: If swallowed, do not induce vomiting: seek medical advice immediately and show this container or label, a safety phrase
- Tonga language (Mozambique)
- S62, a postcode district for Rotherham, England
