= S39 =

S39 may refer to:

== Aviation ==
- Blériot-SPAD S.39, a French reconnaissance aircraft
- Letov Š-39, a Czechoslovak sport aircraft
- Prineville Airport, in Oregon, United States
- Sikorsky S-39, an American flying boat

== Other uses ==
- S39: Wear eye/face protection, a safety phrase
- New Jersey Route 68, designated Route S39 until 1953
- Sulfur-39, an isotope of sulfur
- USS S-39 (SS-144), a submarine in the United States Navy
