= S54 =

S54 may refer to:

== Aircraft ==
- Blériot-SPAD S.54, a French biplane trainer
- Sikorsky S-54, an American helicopter
- Sukhoi S-54, a proposed Russian trainer aircraft

== Other uses ==
- S54 (Long Island bus)
- S54 (New York City bus), serving Staten Island
- BMW S54, an automobile engine
- Prince Skyline (S54), a Japanese sedan
- Ronga language, a Bantu language
- Shorland S54, a British armoured car
- Walbunja language, an Australian Aboriginal language
- Toyota S54, a Toyota S transmission model
