= Borovkov =

Borovkov (Russian: Боровков) is a Russian masculine surname, its feminine counterpart is Borovkova. It may refer to

- Aleksandr Borovkov (1931–2026), Russian mathematician
- Maksym Borovkov (born 1977), Ukrainian football midfielder

== See also ==
- Borovkov-Florov D
- Borovkov-Florov I-207
