= S64 =

S64 may refer to:

== Aviation ==
- Blériot-SPAD S.64, a French biplane trainer
- Savoia-Marchetti S.64, an Italian endurance aircraft
- Sikorsky S-64 Skycrane, later the Erickson S-64 Aircrane, an American helicopter
- Stanford Airport, in Judith Basin County, Montana, United States

== Rail and bus ==
- S64 (Long Island bus), United States
- S64, a Schaffhausen S-Bahn railway service in Switzerland and Germany

== Other uses ==
- Dharug language
- S64: If swallowed, rinse mouth with water (only if the person is conscious), a safety phrase
- Spanish submarine Narval (S 64)
- S64, a postcode district for Mexborough, England
