= S37 =

S37 may refer to:

== Aviation ==
- Blériot-SPAD S.37, a French biplane airliner
- Sikorsky S-37, an American sesquiplane
- Smoketown Airport, in Lancaster County, Pennsylvania, United States
- Sukhoi S-37, an experimental Russian jet fighter

== Other uses ==
- County Route S37 (Bergen County, New Jersey)
- S37: Wear suitable gloves, a safety phrase
- SREC (file format), an ASCII encoding format for binary data
- Sulfur-37, an isotope of sulfur
- Taungurung language
- USS S-37 (SS-142), a submarine of the United States Navy
