= S71 =

S71 may refer to:

== Submarines ==
- INS Chakra (S71), of the Indian Navy
- INS Tanin (S71), of the Israeli Navy
- Spanish submarine Galerna (S71)

== Other uses ==
- S71 (Long Island bus)
- Blériot-SPAD S.71, a French biplane fighter
- Savoia-Marchetti S.71, an Italian transport aircraft
- S71, a postcode district for Barnsley, England
