= S92 =

S92 or S-92 may refer to:

== Aircraft ==
- Avia S-92, a Czechoslovak fighter aircraft
- Blériot-SPAD S.92, a French biplane trainer
- Sikorsky S-92, an American helicopter
- SIPA S.92, a French trainer

== Other uses ==
- S92 (Long Island bus)
- S92 (New York City bus) serving Staten Island
- Daihatsu Zebra (S92), a pickup truck and van
- HMS Talent (S92), a submarine of the Royal Navy
- S92 Luoyang–Lushi Expressway, China
