= Boeing Model 8 =

Biplane by Boeing

Model 8
- "Boeing Model 8"

General information
- Type: civil biplane
- Manufacturer: Boeing
- Status: destroyed
- Primary user: Herb Munter
- Number built: 1

History
- First flight: 24 May 1920

The Boeing Model 8, a.k.a. BB-L6, was an American biplane aircraft designed by Boeing specifically for their test pilot, Herb Munter.

== Development and design ==
The Model 8 design was inspired by the Ansaldo A.1 Balilla. The fuselage was covered in mahogany plywood, with a two-passenger forward cockpit and pilot rear cockpit, a seating configuration that would be the standard for all following three-seaters. The wing configuration and powerplant were similar to the Boeing Model 7.

The Model 8 first flew in 1920, and was the first aircraft to fly over Mount Rainier. The aircraft was destroyed in a hangar fire in Kent, Washington in 1923.

== Specifications (BB-L6) ==
Data from Bowers, 1989. pg. 54.

General characteristics

- Crew: one
- Capacity: three
- Wingspan: 44 ft 9 in (13.64 m)
- Height: 10 ft 10 in (3.30 m)
- Wing area: 465 sq ft (43.2 m^{2})
- Empty weight: 1,652 lb (749 kg)
- Gross weight: 2,632 lb (1,194 kg)
- Powerplant: 1 × Hall-Scott L-6 , 200 hp (150 kW)

Performance

- Maximum speed: 100 mph (161 km/h, 87 kn)
- Cruise speed: 90 mph (145 km/h, 78 kn)
- Range: 450 mi (724 km, 390 nmi)
- Service ceiling: 15,000 ft (4,600 m)
