= Krichyevskii BOK-2 =

BOK-2

General information
- Type: Research Aircraft
- National origin: USSR
- Designer: S. S. Krichyevskii
- Number built: 1

History
- First flight: 1935

The BOK-2 (Byuro Osobykh Konstrooktsiy - bureau of special design) (a.k.a. RK Razreznoye Krylo – slotted wing) was an aerodynamic research aircraft designed by S. S. Krichyevskii and built in the USSR in 1934.

== Development ==
The BOK-2 was a research aircraft fitted with a slotted wing, which comprised the main forward part and the large variable incidence rear section with a slot between them. This small wooden single seater powered by an M-11 engine was flown successfully in 1935 but was abandoned, whilst in the process of being modified to allow the aerofoil, and slotted section, to automatically adopt the most efficient profile, when S. S. Krichyevskii died suddenly late in 1935.

== See also ==
- List of aircraft
