= Blériot-SPAD S.XXI =

1910s French aircraft

S.XXI

General information
- Type: Fighter
- Manufacturer: Blériot
- Designer: André Herbemont
- Primary user: Aéronautique Militaire
- Number built: 1

History
- First flight: 1918
- Developed from: Spad S.XIII

The Blériot-SPAD S.XXI was a prototype fighter plane built by SPAD in the late 1910s, derived from the Spad S.XIII.

== Specifications ==
Data from

General characteristics

- Crew: one
- Length: 6.40 m (21 ft 0 in)
- Wingspan: 8.43 m (27 ft 8 in)
- Height: 2.41 m (7 ft 11 in)
- Wing area: 23.5 m^{2} (253 sq ft)
- Empty weight: 750 kg (1,653 lb)
- Gross weight: 1,048 kg (2,310 lb)
- Powerplant: 1 × Hispano-Suiza 8Fb V-shaped 8-cylinder inline engine , 220 kW (300 hp)

Performance

- Maximum speed: 221 km/h (137 mph, 119 kn)
- Service ceiling: 7,000 m (23,000 ft)

Armament

- 2 × fixed forward-firing synchronized 7.7 mm (0.303 in) Vickers machine guns

== See also ==
Related development

- S.XIII
