= Bloudek =

Bloudek (Czech and Slovak feminine: Bloudková) is a Slavic surname. Notable people with the surname include:

- Bedřich Bloudek (1815–1875), Czech military leader
- Marijan Bloudek (born 1951), Slovene football manager
- Marino Bloudek (born 1999), Croatian runner
- Sandro Bloudek (born 1986), Croatian-Slovene football manager
- Stanko Bloudek (1890–1959), Slovene aeroplane and automobile designer
