= Blériot-SPAD S.28 =

1910s French aircraft

SPAD S.28

General information
- Type: Recording-breaking aircraft
- National origin: France
- Manufacturer: SPAD
- Number built: 2

History
- First flight: 26 September 1919

The Bleriot-SPAD S.28 was a long-range record-breaking aircraft developed by SPAD in the late 1910s. It was a biplane with a monocoque fuselage, and was made of wood and canvas.

== Specifications ==
Data from

General characteristics

- Crew: 1
- Length: 7.30 m (23 ft 11 in)
- Wingspan: 10.52 m (34 ft 6 in)
- Height: 2.80 m (9 ft 2 in)
- Wing area: 31.50 m^{2} (339.1 sq ft)
- Empty weight: 860 kg (1,896 lb)
- Gross weight: 1,506 kg (3,320 lb)
- Powerplant: 1 × Hispano-Suiza 8Fb 8-cylinder rotary piston engine, 220 kW (300 hp)
- Propellers: 2-bladed fixed pitchpropeller

Performance

- Maximum speed: 210 km/h (130 mph, 110 kn)

== See also ==
Related lists

- List of Interwar military aircraft
