= Blériot-SPAD S.36 =

1920s French aircraft

SPAD S.36

General information
- Type: Reconnaissance aircraft
- National origin: France
- Manufacturer: SPAD
- Number built: 1

History
- First flight: 17 January 1923

The Bleriot-SPAD S.36 was a French reconnaissance aircraft built in the early 1920s.

== Design ==
The S.36 was a biplane with a monocoque fuselage of wood and canvas construction. Only one airframe was built, and flight tests ended due to the failure of the supercharger.

== Specifications ==
Data from

General characteristics

- Crew: 2
- Length: 9.02 m (29 ft 7 in)
- Wingspan: 11.46 m (37 ft 7 in)
- Height: 3.25 m (10 ft 8 in)
- Wing area: 39.00 m^{2} (419.8 sq ft)
- Empty weight: 1,017 kg (2,242 lb)
- Gross weight: 1,725 kg (3,803 lb)
- Powerplant: 1 × Hispano-Suiza 8F v-8 water-cooled piston engine, 220 kW (300 hp) with Rateau turbo-charger
- Propellers: 2-bladed fixed pitchpropeller

Performance

- Maximum speed: 200 km/h (120 mph, 110 kn)

== See also ==
Related lists

- List of Interwar military aircraft
