= Blériot-SPAD S.540 =

1930s French trainer aircraft

S.540

General information
- Type: monoplane trainer
- National origin: France
- Manufacturer: SPAD
- Number built: 2

History
- First flight: 4 October 1930

The Bleriot-SPAD S.540 was a trainer monoplane aircraft built by SPAD in the early 1930s.

== Specifications ==
Data from

General characteristics

- Crew: 2
- Length: 7.08 m (23 ft 3 in)
- Wingspan: 10.9 m (35 ft 9 in)
- Height: 2.8 m (9 ft 2 in)
- Wing area: 19 m^{2} (200 sq ft)
- Empty weight: 630 kg (1,389 lb)
- Gross weight: 862 kg (1,900 lb)
- Powerplant: 1 × Salmson 9AC 9-cylinder air-cooled radial piston engine, 89 kW (120 hp)

Performance

- Maximum speed: 145 km/h (90 mph, 78 kn)
