= Blériot-SPAD S.40 =

1920s French aircraft

SPAD S.40

General information
- Type: Observation aircraft
- National origin: France
- Manufacturer: SPAD

History
- First flight: 22 August 1922

The Bleriot-SPAD S.40 was a French observation aircraft built in the early 1920s.

== Design ==
The S.40 was a biplane with a monocoque fuselage of wood and canvas construction.

== Specifications ==
Data from

General characteristics

- Crew: 2
- Length: 9.02 m (29 ft 7 in)
- Wingspan: 12.47 m (40 ft 11 in)
- Height: 3.25 m (10 ft 8 in)
- Wing area: 43.00 m^{2} (462.8 sq ft)
- Empty weight: 1,282 kg (2,826 lb)
- Gross weight: 1,982 kg (4,370 lb)
- Powerplant: 1 × Lorraine 12D V-12 water-cooled piston engine, 280 kW (370 hp)
- Propellers: 2-bladed fixed pitchpropeller

Performance

- Maximum speed: 215 km/h (134 mph, 116 kn)

== See also ==
Related lists

- List of Interwar military aircraft
