= Boeing XAT-15 =

Military training aircraft prototype by Boeing

AT-15
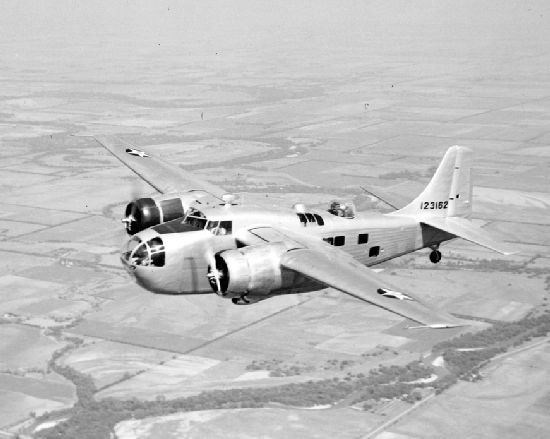

General information
- Type: Bomber-crew trainer
- National origin: United States
- Manufacturer: Boeing Wichita
- Primary user: United States Army Air Corps
- Number built: 2

History
- First flight: 9 April 1942

The Boeing AT-15 was an American twin-engined bomber crew trainer designed and built by Boeing's Wichita Division. Only two prototypes, designated XAT-15, were built. Plans to build over 1,000 were cancelled on the United States' entry into the Second World War.

== Development ==
One of the first projects for the former Stearman Aircraft Company which in 1939 had become the Wichita Division of Boeing was a twin-engined trainer for bomber crews. Designated X-120 by the company, two examples were ordered by the United States Army Air Corps as the XAT-15. The AT-15 was a high-wing cantilever monoplane with two wing-mounted Pratt & Whitney R-1340 Wasp radial engines. It had a retractable tailwheel landing gear and an extended glazed fuselage nose for the trainee bomb-aimer. Due to shortage of materials, the aircraft was built of welded steel tube covered with plywood, with wooden wings and tail unit. The two aircraft were delivered to the USAAC, but after the country's entry into the war a change in priorities resulted in the planned order for more than 1,000 aircraft not being placed.

According to Edward H. Phillips, "The aircraft's specific purpose would be to teach prospective bomber crews how to work together as a team before they were assigned to an operational unit." On 19 May 1941, Boeing signed a contract to build two of the aircraft. On 9 April 1942, the first flight occurred. In October 1942, the first XAT-15 was delivered. However, special schools for gunners, bombardiers, navigators, and pilots developed during the war, and the need for the XAT-15 disappeared. As a result, production was halted and materials salvaged.

== Operator ==
United States

- United States Army Air Corps

== Specifications (XAT-15) ==
Data from

General characteristics

- Length: 42 ft 4 in (12.90 m)
- Wingspan: 59 ft 8 in (18.19 m)
- Height: 13 ft 1 in (3.99 m)
- Wing area: 457 sq ft (42.5 m^{2})
- Empty weight: 10,640 lb (4,826 kg)
- Gross weight: 14,355 lb (6,511 kg)
- Powerplant: 2 × Pratt & Whitney R-1340-AN-1 Wasp radial piston engine , 600 hp (450 kW) each

Performance

- Maximum speed: 207 mph (333 km/h, 180 kn) at 5,000 ft (1,500 m)
- Cruise speed: 185 mph (298 km/h, 161 kn)
- Range: 850 mi (1,370 km, 740 nmi)
- Service ceiling: 18,900 ft (5,800 m)
- Time to altitude: 11.9 minutes to 10,000 ft (3,000 m)

Armament

- 4 x 0.3in (7.62mm) machine-gun
- 10 x 100lb (45kg) bomb

== See also ==
Related lists

- List of military aircraft of the United States
