= Bishop RB-1 Ray's Rebel =

RB-1 Ray's Rebel

General information
- Type: Two-seat homebuilt light aircraft
- National origin: United States
- Designer: Ray Bishop
- Number built: 1

History
- First flight: 28 March 1970

The RB-1 Ray's Rebel is an American two-seat light sporting aircraft designed and built by Ray Bishop of Norton, Ohio.

== Design and development ==
The Ray's Rebel is a braced low-wing monoplane with a welded steel-tube fuselage covered in fabric. The wing is an all-wood construction covered with Ceconite, it has endplates on the wing tips and frise-type ailerons but has no flaps or trim tabs. Ray's Rebel is powered by a 125 hp (93 kW) Lycoming O-290-G air-cooled piston engine driving a two-bladed fixed pitch tractor propeller. The landing gear is a fixed tailwheel type with a glassfibre fairing over the wheel. The enclosed cockpit has two side-by-side configuration seats under a rearward-sliding canopy. Bishop started designing the aircraft in October 1954 and started construction in February 1955, fifteen years later it was completed and now registered N971RB. Roy's Rebel first flew on 28 March 1970.

== Specifications ==
Data from Jane's All the World's Aircraft 1973-74

General characteristics

- Crew: 2
- Length: 22 ft 0 in (6.71 m)
- Wingspan: 23 ft 5 in (7.14 m)
- Height: 5 ft 6 in (1.68 m)
- Wing area: 117.5 sq ft (10.9 m^{2})
- Empty weight: 1,100 lb (499 kg)
- Gross weight: 1,550 lb (703 kg)
- Powerplant: 1 × Lycoming O-290-G four-cylinder horizontally-opposed air-cooled piston engine , 125 hp (93 kW)

Performance

- Maximum speed: 180 mph (289 km/h, 160 kn)
- Cruise speed: 150 mph (241 km/h, 130 kn)
- Stall speed: 56 mph (90.5 km/h, 49 kn)
- Range: 275 mi (442 km, 239 nmi)
- Service ceiling: 15,000 ft (4,570 m)
- Rate of climb: 1,800 ft/min (9.1 m/s)
