= Blériot-SPAD S.38 =

1920s French fighter aircraft

S.38

General information
- Type: Fighter
- Manufacturer: Blériot
- Primary user: Aéronautique Militaire
- Number built: 1

History
- First flight: 1920

The Blériot-SPAD S.38 was a French fighter aircraft developed in the early 1920s.

== Design and development ==
The S.38 was a single-seat fighter plane of all-wood construction with canvas. The aircraft was intended to test a cable hook.

== Specifications ==
Data from

General characteristics

- Crew: 1
- Length: 5.51 m (18 ft 1 in)
- Wingspan: 7.1 m (23 ft 4 in)
- Height: 4 m (13 ft 1 in)
- Wing area: 16 m^{2} (170 sq ft)
- Empty weight: 380 kg (838 lb)
- Gross weight: 500 kg (1,102 lb)
- Powerplant: × Le Rhône 9C 9-cylinder air-cooled rotary piston engine, 60 kW (80 hp)

Performance
