= Blériot XLII =

WWI French reconnaissance aircraft

General information
- Type: Reconnaissance
- National origin: France
- Manufacturer: Blériot
- Status: prototype only
- Number built: 1

History
- First flight: March 1913

The Blériot XLII was a First World War French reconnaissance plane designed and built by Blériot.

== Design ==
The crew was housed in a partially armored cabin. A small window was installed in front of the fuselage to facilitate observation. For reconnaissance, the observer lay horizontally on the cabin floor.

== Development ==
The Bleriot XLII was built in March 1913 for use as a reconnaissance and observation aircraft. It was a double mid-flight, equipped with an 80 hp Gnome engine. The Bleriot XLII passed the test cycle, but the military was not interested.

== Specifications ==
Data from Aviafrtance : Blériot XLII

General characteristics

- Crew: 2
- Length: 7.30 m (23 ft 11 in)
- Wingspan: 8.50 m (27 ft 11 in)
- Wing area: 18.00 m^{2} (193.8 sq ft)
- Powerplant: 1 × Gnome Monosoupape 7 Type A air-cooled rotary piston engine, 60 kW (80 hp)
- Propellers: 2-bladed fixed-pitch propellers
