= Bird Wing Imperial =

General information
- Type: Biplane
- National origin: United States of America
- Manufacturer: Bird Wing Commercial Aircraft Company
- Designer: R. T. McCrum
- Status: Out of business 1931
- Number built: 6

History
- Introduction date: 1927
- First flight: 15 July 1927

The Bird Wing or later, Bird Wing Imperial was a light sport biplane of the 1920s and 1930s.

== Development ==
The first Bird Wing took McCrum and his assistants 63 days to build at a cost of US$12,000. The prototype flew over 5000 passengers over a period of 15 months. Charles Lindbergh flew the plane for 45 minutes of his lotted hour of time in St Joseph during his stop in St Joseph, MO during his 1927 tour. The second plane was also powered by a Curtiss OX-5 engine. The 3rd plane was the first Imperial powered by a Wright-Hisso engine the fourth and fifth planes were powered by Wright J5 Whirlwinds. The US Army ordered 50 Imperials to be used as trainer, the order was cancelled due to the depression. The company was taken to bankruptcy court by its creditors in Jan 1931. The company's assets were sold at auction in February. McCrum revised the plans for the Bird Wing again in the 1950s to install a 450 hp (336 kW) Pratt & Whitney R-985 Wasp Junior radial engine and a 3-inch fuselage widening to convert the design into an agricultural aircraft which never went into production. St Joseph News Press/Gazette

== Design ==
The biplane features welded steel tube fuselage with aircraft fabric covering and spruce wood spar wings.

== Operational history ==
Among the many pilots who flew the Bird Wing were Hap Arnold and Charles Lindbergh. McCrum offered comprehensive flight training courses which included flight training in a Bird Wing as well as construction of the aircraft from scratch. The Bird Wing Imperial was tested to meet a 1931 requirement for a United States PT (primary trainer). 50 orders were placed, then canceled at the beginning of the Great Depression.

== Variants ==
- Bird Wing No 1 - 1927 Powered by closely cowled OX-5 engine
- Bird Wing No. 2 - 1928 Upper and lower ailerons
- Bird Wing No, 3 - 1929 Imperial powered by 180 hp Wright-Hisso engine
- Bird Wing No. 4 - 1930 Imperial powered Wright J5 radial engine
- Bird Wing No, 5 - 1930 Imperial Wright R-540 powered. Max speed 125 mph

== Specifications (Bird Wing Model 1) 1927 ==
Data from Sport Aviation, Jane's All the World's Aircraft 1928

General characteristics

- Crew: 1
- Capacity: 2 pax
- Length: 23 ft 6 in (7.16 m)
- Wingspan: 31 ft 4 in (9.55 m)
- Height: 8 ft 7 in (2.62 m)
- Wing area: 303.5 sq ft (28.20 m^{2})
- Airfoil: Aeromarine 2
- Empty weight: 1,236 lb (561 kg)
- Gross weight: 2,255 lb (1,023 kg)
- Fuel capacity: 34.5 US gal (28.7 imp gal; 131 L)
- Powerplant: 1 × Curtiss OX-5 V-8 water-cooled piston engine, 90 hp (67 kW)
- Propellers: 2-bladed wooden fixed pitch propeller

Performance

- Maximum speed: 90 mph (140 km/h, 78 kn)
- Cruise speed: 75 mph (121 km/h, 65 kn)
- Landing speed: 30 mph (26 kn; 48 km/h)
- Service ceiling: 10,000 ft (3,000 m)
- Rate of climb: 460 ft/min (2.3 m/s)
- Wing loading: 6.95 lb/sq ft (33.9 kg/m^{2})
- Power/mass: 0.04 hp/lb (0.066 kW/kg)
