= BOK-3 =

General information
- Type: Liaison aircraft
- National origin: USSR
- Manufacturer: BOK
- Number built: 1

History
- First flight: 1933

The BOK-3 (Byuro Osobykh Konstrooktsiy – bureau of special design) (a.k.a. IS -executive committee aircraft) was a liaison aircraft designed and built in the USSR from 1933.

== Development ==
This wooden low-wing monoplane aircraft with semi-monocoque fuselage, ply covered wings and fabric covered control surfaces, was built in 1933 as a four-seat liaison aircraft with two cockpits, for two side by side, fore and aft of the wing mainspar, fixed tailwheel undercarriage and slotted flaps out to half span. Variants planned included a crop sprayer/seeder and a military trainer with a PV-1 fixed to fire forwards, a manually operated turret with a single DA, and provision for a single FAB-100 100 kg bomb or a reconnaissance camera.

== Specifications (BOK-3) ==
Data from Gunston, Bill. “The Osprey Encyclopaedia of Russian Aircraft 1875–1995”. London, Osprey. 1995. ISBN 1-85532-405-9

General characteristics

- Crew: 1
- Capacity: 3 pax
- Length: 7.1 m (23 ft 3.5 in)
- Wingspan: 11 m (36 ft 1 in)
- Powerplant: 1 × M-48 7-cyl radial , 149 kW (200 hp)

Performance

== See also ==
Aircraft of comparable role, configuration, and era

- Airspeed Envoy
- Percival Proctor

Related lists

- List of aircraft
