= Boeing XP-7 =

Fighter prototype aircraft by Boeing

XP-7
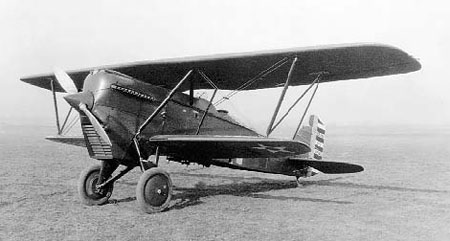

General information
- Type: Experimental Fighter
- Manufacturer: Boeing
- Primary user: United States Army Air Corps
- Number built: 1

History
- First flight: September 1928
- Developed from: Boeing PW-9D

The Boeing XP-7 was a prototype United States biplane fighter of the 1920s.

== Development and design ==
The XP-7 started life as the last Boeing Model 15 (PW-9D), serial 28-41. It was then adapted to mount the 600 hp Curtiss V-1570 Conqueror engine. Labelled by Boeing as their Model 93, the XP-7's nose was shorter and deeper than that of the standard PW-9, and the craft was 75 pounds lighter overall.

It first flew in September 1928 and did well, with a 17 mph speed increase over the PW-9. However, despite a proposal to build an additional four P-7s, the design was at the very limits of its capabilities and somewhat outdated even by the time of its first flight. At the end of testing, the Conqueror engine was removed and the aircraft converted back into a PW-9D.

== Operators ==
United States

- United States Army Air Corps

== Specifications ==
Data from

General characteristics

- Crew: 1
- Length: 24 ft 0 in (7.31 m)
- Wingspan: 32 ft 0 in (9.75 m)
- Height: 9 ft 0 in (2.74 m)
- Wing area: 252 sq ft (23.4 m^{2})
- Empty weight: 2,358 lb (1,070 kg)
- Gross weight: 3,260 lb (1,479 kg)
- Powerplant: 1 × Curtiss V-1570-1 , 600 hp (450 kW)

Performance

- Maximum speed: 167.5 mph (270 km/h, 145.6 kn)
- Cruise speed: 134 mph (216 km/h, 116 kn)
- Range: 250 mi (402 km, 220 nmi)
- Service ceiling: 22,300 ft (6,797 m)
- Rate of climb: 1,408 ft/min (7.2 m/s)

Armament

- 1x .50in machine gun
- 1x .30in machine gun
- 125lb (57kg) bombs

Related lists

- List of military aircraft of the United States
- List of fighter aircraft
