= Blériot-SPAD S.25 =

SPAD S.25
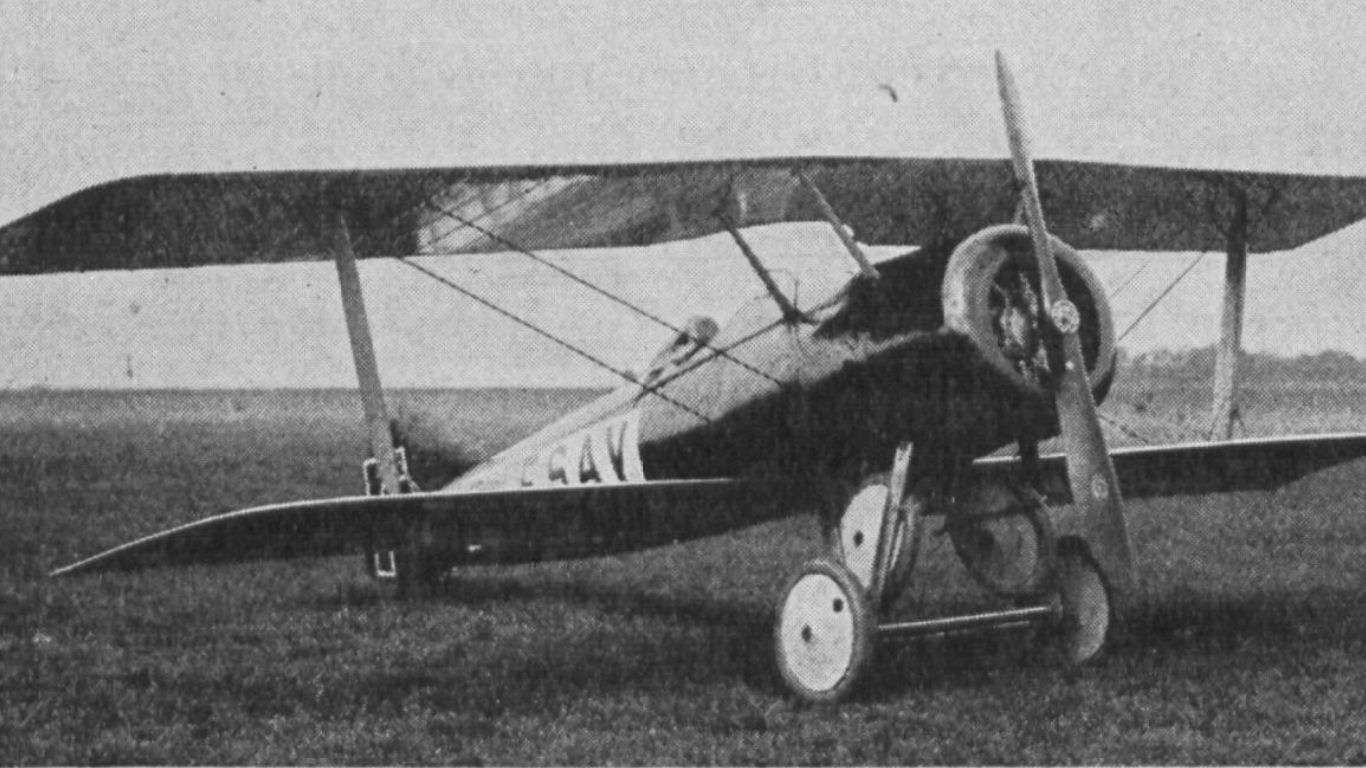

General information
- Type: Recording-breaking aircraft
- National origin: France
- Manufacturer: SPAD
- Number built: 1

History
- First flight: 29 August 1921

The Bleriot-SPAD S.25 was a single-seater long-distance airplane built at the request of Leith Jensen who wanted to connect Newfoundland to Iceland.

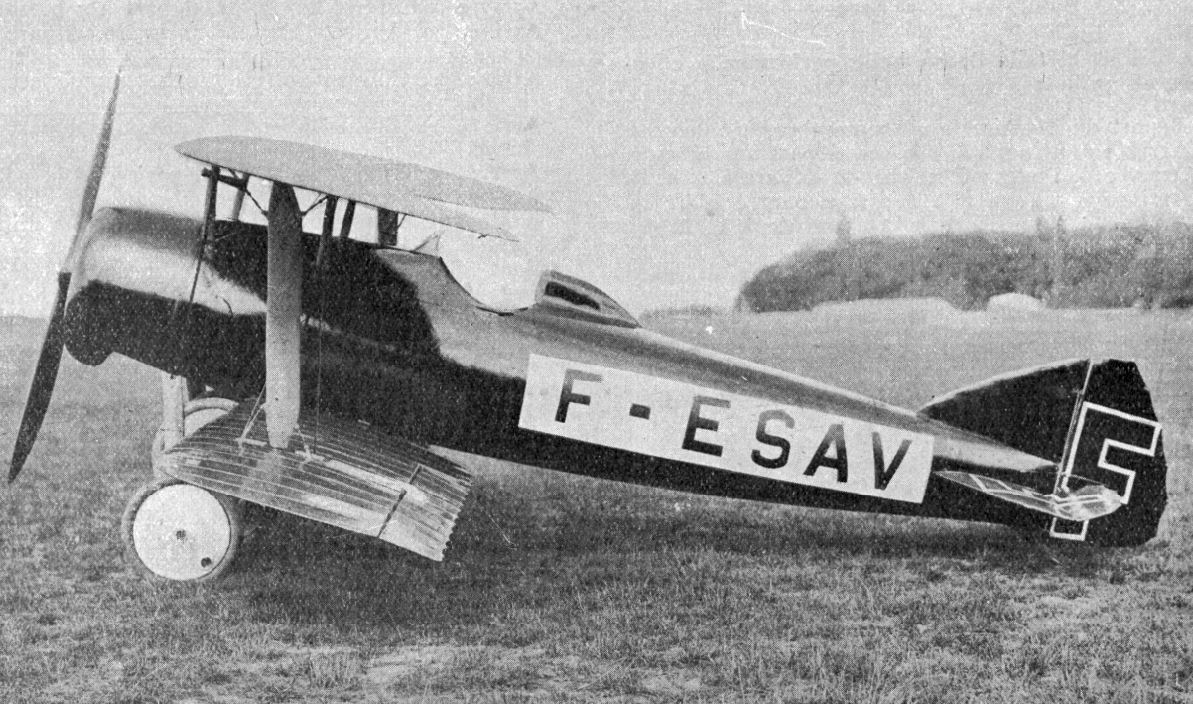
side view

== Design ==
The S.25 was a biplane with a monocoque fuselage of wood and canvas construction and was to have a watertight fuselage and quick emptying tanks were to be used as floats, where appropriate. Jensen's bid to fly from Newfoundland to Iceland was abandoned after the feat of Alcook and Brown, so the S.25 flew on August 29, 1921 as a sports aircraft.

== Specifications ==
Data from

General characteristics

- Crew: 1
- Length: 6.50 m (21 ft 4 in)
- Wingspan: 8.12 m (26 ft 8 in)
- Height: 2.50 m (8 ft 2 in)
- Wing area: 19.50 m^{2} (209.9 sq ft)
- Empty weight: 467 kg (1,030 lb)
- Gross weight: 931 kg (2,053 lb)
- Powerplant: 1 × Le Rhone 9-cylinder rotary piston engine, 71 kW (95 hp)
- Propellers: 2-bladed fixed pitchpropeller

Performance

- Maximum speed: 160 km/h (99 mph, 86 kn)

== See also ==
Related lists

- List of Interwar military aircraft
