= Boeing XP-9 =

Fighter aircraft prototype by Boeing

XP-9
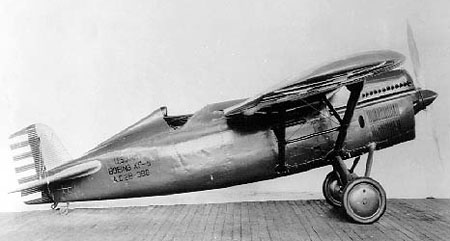
- Boeing XP-9

General information
- Type: Monoplane fighter
- Manufacturer: Boeing
- Status: Cancelled
- Primary user: United States Army (intended)
- Number built: 1

History
- First flight: 18 November 1930

The Boeing XP-9 (company Model 96) was the first monoplane fighter aircraft produced by the United States aircraft manufacturing company Boeing. It incorporated sophisticated structural refinements that were influential in later Boeing designs. The sole prototype exhibited unsatisfactory characteristics with its lack of pilot visibility directly leading to its cancellation.

== Design and development ==
The XP-9 was designed in 1928 to meet the requirements of a US Army request for a monoplane fighter. Its primary contribution to aircraft design was its semi-monocoque construction, which would become a standard for future aircraft. Boeing employed the structural features of the XP-9 into their contemporary P-12 biplane fighter when the P-12E variant incorporated a semi-monocoque metal fuselage structure similar to that of the XP-9. The undercarriage arrangement of the P-12C had also been first tried out on the XP-9 and then transferred into the production model.

== Operational history ==
The prototype XP-9, marked A 028-386, was first flown on 18 November 1930. It had impressive stats on the specification sheet, but it quickly became apparent that its large (6 ft chord) wing, which was placed atop the fuselage directly in front of the pilot, obstructed downward visibility so badly that simple landing maneuvers were hazardous. Test pilots at the Army Test Centre at Wright Field found that the XP-9's inherent instability was so severe that immediate modifications were requested to increase the size of the vertical tail. An enlarged vertical tail surface with smooth metal skinning was introduced, but failed to affect any significant improvement, and this revised XP-9 was grounded for instructional airframe use in August 1931, after only 15 hours of test flying, due to the impossibility of its being landed safely.

== Variants ==
Model 96, XP-9
one built
Y1P-9
option for five service test aircraft under the P-12D contract, option was not taken up

== Operators (planned) ==
United States

- United States Army

== Specifications (Boeing XP-9) ==
Data from The Complete Encyclopedia of World Aircraft.

General characteristics

- Crew: 1
- Length: 25 ft 1.75 in (7.66 m)
- Wingspan: 36 ft 6 in (11.13 m)
- Height: 7 ft 10.25 in (3.0 m)
- Wing area: 210 sq ft (19.51 m^{2})
- Empty weight: 2,669 lb (1,211 kg)
- Max takeoff weight: 3,623 lb (1,643 kg)
- Powerplant: × 1 Curtiss SV-1570-15 Conqueror, 600 hp (448 kW)

Performance

- Maximum speed: 185 kn (213 mph, 343 km/h)
- Cruise speed: 156 kn (180 mph, 290 km/h)
- Range: 369 nmi (425 mi, 684 km)
- Service ceiling: 26,800 ft (8,170 m)
- Rate of climb: 1,560 ft/min (7.9 m/s)

Armament

- Guns: 2 x machine guns, one .30 (7.62mm) and one .50 (12.7mm)
- Bombs: 125 lb bombs

== See also ==
Related lists

- List of military aircraft of the United States
- List of fighter aircraft
