= Boeing XP3B =

Type of aircraft

XP3B

General information
- Type: Patrol aircraft
- National origin: United States
- Manufacturer: Boeing
- Primary user: United States Navy
- Number built: 0

The Boeing XP3B-1 (company designation Model 466) was a proposed patrol aircraft, developed by Boeing for use by the United States Navy in the late 1940s. It was planned to be powered by two Allison T40 turboprops driving contra-rotating propellers, and utilized tandem landing gear. The project was cancelled before any aircraft were built.

== Specifications ==
Data from Bowers

General characteristics

- Length: 108 ft 11 in (33.20 m)
- Wingspan: 125 ft (38 m)
- Height: 32 ft 10 in (10.01 m)
- Wing area: 1,400 sq ft (130 m^{2})
- Empty weight: 66,000 lb (29,937 kg)
- Gross weight: 127,000 lb (57,606 kg)
- Powerplant: 2 × Allison T40-A-2 turboprops, 5,200 shp (3,900 kW) each
- Propellers: 6-bladed, 17 ft (5.2 m) diameter

Performance

- Maximum speed: 395 kn (454 mph, 731 km/h)
- Range: 4,497 nmi (5,175 mi, 8,328 km)
