= Chizhevski BOK-5 =

BOK-5
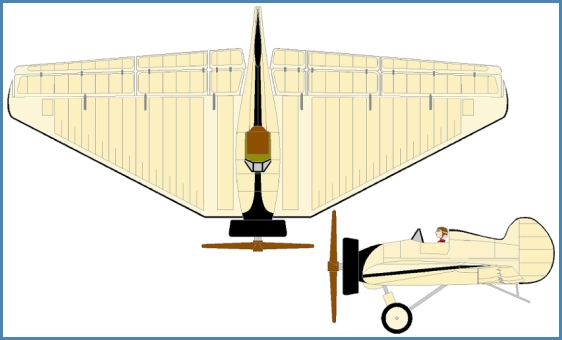

General information
- Type: Tail-less research aircraft
- National origin: USSR
- Manufacturer: BOK
- Designer: Vladimir Chizhevsky
- Number built: 1

History
- First flight: summer 1937

The BOK-5 (Russian: БОК-5) was a tail-less research aircraft designed and built in the USSR from 1937, by the Byuro Osobykh Konstrooktsiy (bureau of special design) (Russian: Бюро особых конструкций (БОК)).

== Development ==
The dural and fabric BOK-5 was a single-engined tail-less monoplane used to develop trailing edge controls for tail-less aircraft. The aircraft had a low aspect ratio moderately tapered wing with the fixed tail-wheel undercarriage, single M-11 engine, pilots cockpit all accommodated by the central nacelle which faired into an integral fin, with rudder, at the rear. The trailing edges were each divided into three with elevators inboard, flaps in the middle and ailerons outboard, with all controls inter-connected as required for the test being carried out (sometimes termed 'Flailevators' although this is usually used for single surfaces performing all three control tasks, not separate surfaces with control mixing). Flight trials were carried out by Stefanovskii and Nyukhtikov from the summer of 1937.

== Variants ==
- BOK-6 - Projected tail-less heavy bomber (a.k.a. TB)

== Specifications (BOK-5) ==
Data from Gunston, Bill. “The Osprey Encyclopaedia of Russian Aircraft 1875–1995”. London, Osprey. 1995. ISBN 1-85532-405-9

General characteristics

- Crew: 1
- Length: 4.365 m (14 ft 4 in)
- Wingspan: 9.86 m (32 ft 4.25 in)
- Wing area: 23.15 m^{2} (249 sq ft)
- Empty weight: 596 kg (1,314 lb)
- Gross weight: 764 kg (1,684 lb)
- Powerplant: 1 × M-11 5-cyl radial , 75 kW (100 hp)

Performance

- Maximum speed: 174 km/h (108 mph, 94 kn)
- Range: 600 km (373 mi, 324 nmi)
- Service ceiling: 4,850 m (15,900 ft)

== See also ==
Aircraft of comparable role, configuration, and era

- Horten H.II
- Westland Pterodactyl Mk.1A

Related lists

- List of aircraft
