= Blériot-SPAD S.XXII =

1920s French fighter aircraft

S.XXII

General information
- Type: Fighter
- Manufacturer: Blériot
- Designer: André Herbemont
- Primary user: Aéronautique Militaire
- Number built: 1

History
- First flight: 1919

The SPAD S.XXII was a prototype fighter plane built by SPAD shortly World War I.

== Design and development ==
The S.XXII was a two-seat biplane fighter of all-wood construction with a canvas coating and a monocoque fuselage. The upper and lower wings tended to sweep in opposite directions.

== Specifications ==
Data from

General characteristics

- Crew: 1
- Length: 6.48 m (21 ft 3 in)
- Wingspan: 9.8 m (32 ft 2 in)
- Height: 2.56 m (8 ft 5 in)
- Wing area: 26.2 m^{2} (282 sq ft)
- Empty weight: 650 kg (1,433 lb)
- Powerplant: 1 × Hispano-Suiza 8Fb V-8 water-cooled piston engine, 220 kW (300 hp)

Performance
