= Blériot XXXVI Torpille =

1910s French aircraft

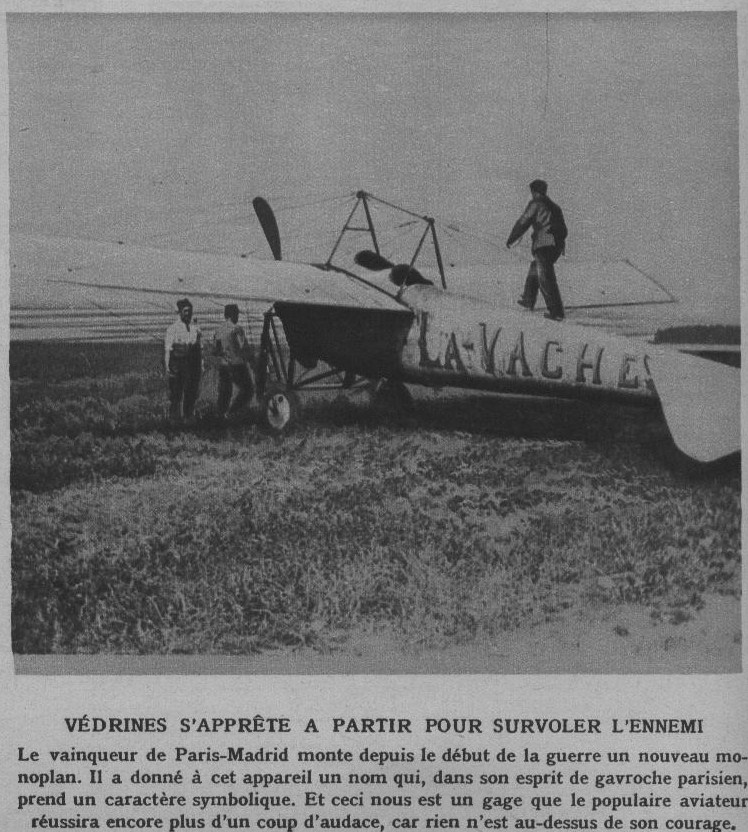
- Jules Védrines and his Blériot XXXVIbis La Vache

General information
- Type: Observation aircraft
- National origin: France
- Manufacturer: Recherches Aéronautique Louis Blériot

History
- First flight: November 1912

The Blériot XXXVI Torpille was an observation monoplane designed in France by Louis Bleriot during the early 1910s. The Blériot XXXVIbis La Vache was operated by Jules Védrines on several daring missions behind enemy lines in the early months of the war.

== Specifications ==
Data from

General characteristics

- Crew: 1
- Length: 8.33 m (27 ft 4 in)
- Wingspan: 12.25 m (40 ft 2 in)
- Wing area: 25 m^{2} (270 sq ft)
- Empty weight: 375 kg (827 lb)
- Powerplant: 1 × Gnome Lambda 7-cylinder air-cooled rotary piston engine, 60 kW (80 hp)
- Propellers: 2-bladed
- Maximum speed: 115 km/h (71 mph, 62 kn)
