= Blériot XXXIX =

1910s French aircraft

General information
- Type: Observation aircraft
- National origin: France
- Manufacturer: Recherches Aéronautique Louis Blériot

History
- First flight: 1913

The Bleriot XXXIX was a single-seat observation monoplane designed in France by Louis Bleriot during the early 1910s.

== Specifications ==
Data from

General characteristics

- Crew: 1
- Length: 6.15 m (20 ft 2 in)
- Wingspan: 11.10 m (36 ft 5 in)
- Wing area: 19 m^{2} (200 sq ft)
- Empty weight: 440 kg (970 lb)
- Gross weight: 615 kg (1,356 lb)
- Powerplant: 1 × Gnome Monosoupape 7 Type A 7-cylinder air-cooled rotary piston engine, 60 kW (80 hp)
- Propellers: 2-bladed
- Maximum speed: 128 km/h (80 mph, 69 kn)
