= Maksym Borovkov =

Ukrainian footballer

Personal information
- Full name: Maksym Valeriyovych Borovkov
- Date of birth: 5 April 1977 (age 49)
- Place of birth: Ukrainian SSR, Soviet Union
- Height: 1.84 m (6 ft 1/2 in)
- Positions: Midfielder; forward

Senior career*
| Years | Team | Apps | (Gls) |
| 1995–1996 | FC Metalurh Novomoskovsk | 16 | (0) |
| 2001–2002 | FC Elektrometalurh-NZF Nikopol | 63 | (15) |
| 2003–2004 | FC Krasyliv | 49 | (1) |
| 2004–2006 | FC Podillya Khmelnytskyi | 81 | (3) |
| 2007 | Prykarpattya Ivano-Frankivsk | 4 | (0) |
| 2007–2010 | FC Desna Chernihiv | 89 | (1) |
| 2010 | FSC Prykarpattya Ivano-Frankivsk | 11 | (0) |
| 2011–2012 | FC Desna Chernihiv | 5 | (0) |
- * Club domestic league appearances and goals

Maksym Valeriyovych Borovkov (Ukrainian: Максим Валерійович Боровков; born 5 April 1977) is a professional Ukrainian football midfielder and forward who plays for FSC Prykarpattya Ivano-Frankivsk in the Ukrainian First League. He has previously played for FC Metalurh Novomoskovsk, FC Elektrometalurh-NZF Nikopol, FC Krasyliv, FC Podillya Khmelnytskyi, Prykarpattya Ivano-Frankivsk and FC Desna Chernihiv.
