= Blériot-SPAD S.32 =

1920s French aircraft

SPAD S.32

General information
- Type: Recording-breaking aircraft
- National origin: France
- Manufacturer: SPAD
- Number built: 1

History
- First flight: 10 May 1920

The Bleriot-SPAD S.32 was a record-breaking aircraft built by SPAD in the early 1920s.

== Design ==
The S.32 was a biplane with a monocoque fuselage of wood and canvas construction. Its engine was equipped with a device to vary the compression ratio to reduce the power loss caused by altitude.

== Specifications ==
Data from

General characteristics

- Crew: 2
- Length: 5.91 m (19 ft 5 in)
- Wingspan: 8.59 m (28 ft 2 in)
- Height: 1.51 m (4 ft 11 in)
- Wing area: 20.80 m^{2} (223.9 sq ft)
- Empty weight: 510 kg (1,124 lb)
- Gross weight: 675 kg (1,488 lb)
- Powerplant: 1 × Damblanc-Mutti 165hp piston engine, 123 kW (165 hp)
- Propellers: 2-bladed fixed pitchpropeller

Performance

== See also ==
Related lists

- List of Interwar military aircraft
