= Bourgois-Sénémaud AT =

Parasol wing, two seat touring aircraft

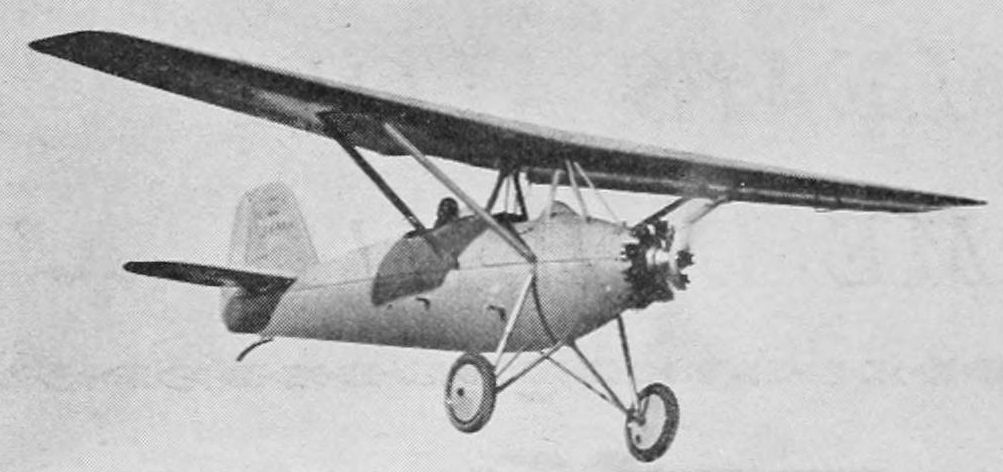
- AT.1

General information
- Type: Touring aircraft
- National origin: France
- Manufacturer: Bernard Bourgois
- Designer: Sénémaud
- Number built: 3

History
- First flight: 1928

The Bourgois-Sénémaud AT was a parasol wing, two seat touring aircraft built in France in 1928. Three examples were completed.

== Design and development ==
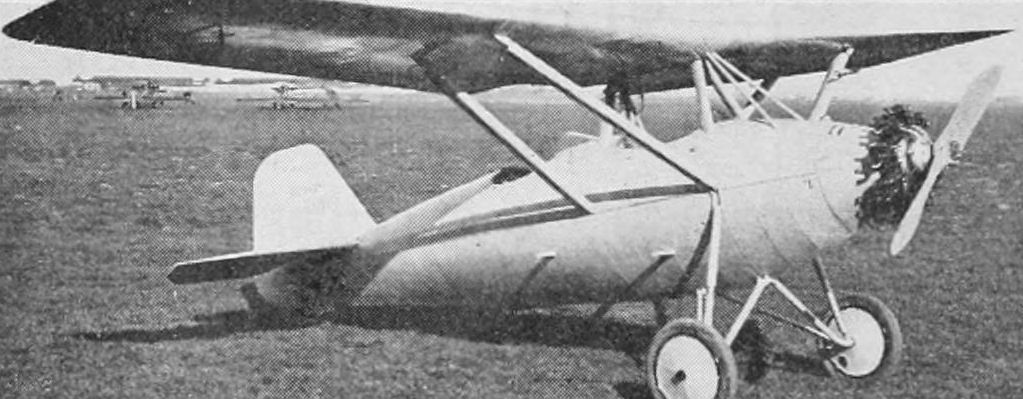
Bourgois-Sénémaud AT.1 photo from Aero Digest December 1929

Bernard Bourgois was a well-known French coachbuilder who became interested in light aircraft construction in the later 1920s and turned to the established aircraft designer Sénémaud to realise his ideas.

The result was the Bourgois-Sénémaud AT, an attractive aircraft of clean design, high build quality and comfort. Its parasol wing was in two symmetric parts and had a trapezoidal plan with gentle taper and squared-off tips. It tapered strongly in thickness, particularly on the underside, increasing the dihedral to about 2.5° at mean thickness. Each half-wing had two spruce box spars and was covered with stressed plywood. The ailerons were unusually narrow and long, filling the whole trailing edge. In addition to their usual differential action, they could be used together as flaps to alter the camber. The wing was held high above the fuselage on pairs of parallel struts, without wire bracing, from the principal fuselage frames at mid-fuselage to the wing spars at about 45% span. The centre-section was joined by a cabane of three inverted V-struts from the upper fuselage, one vertical and one backward-leaning to the forward spar and the other, vertical, to the rear.

The first AT, known as the AT.35 was powered by a nose-mounted 26 kW (35 hp), three-cylinder Anzani 3A2 radial engine. The fuselage was built around a triangular section girder which provided a backbone on which transverse frames were mounted to define the ovoid section, ply-skinned exterior. There were two tandem seats in open cockpits with windscreens, the passenger placed below the wing at the centre of gravity and the pilot behind just under the trailing edge. Two starboard-side doors eased access. The fuselage tapered both in plan and particularly in profile, allowing the AT's large-area, short-span tailplane to be attached to the top of the internal girder. Its separate elevators were narrow and constant-chord. Like the tailplane, the fin had a swept leading edge and squared-off top. It carried a narrow-chord rudder which ran down to the keel, working in the gap between the elevators. The control surfaces were unbalanced.

Its undercarriage was fixed and conventional, with a track of 1.80 m (71 in). Each main wheel was mounted on a hinged steel cranked axle and a backward-reaching drag strut, both from the central fuselage underside. A longer, telescopic strut to mid-fuselage containing rubber rings acted as a shock absorber, though oleo struts could be fitted instead. There was a spring-steel tailskid.

The AT.35 first flew in 1928 and was displayed at the Paris Salon in mid-summer. By the following spring the Anzani engine had been replaced by a 30 kW (40 hp) Salmson 9Ad nine-cylinder radial and the aircraft consequentially redesignated as the AT.40 or as the AT.1. Deckert flew it for the first time on 18 April 1929; it was about 100 kg (220 lb) heavier than the AT.35 but some 30 km/h (19 mph) faster.

== Operational history ==
The AT.1 had completed its certification by September 1929. In April 1930 Deckert gave an aerobatic display at Orly. In May it was flown from there by its new owner Robert David to his home in Marseille, a trip which took 7 hr 15 min including a stop at Dijon. At the end of October 1930 he advertised it for sale, having flown a total of 35 hr. It went to the Provencale aero club but by May 1932 they, too, had put it up for sale.

Two more AT.1s were built but their histories are not known; only one Bourgois appears on reconstructed French civil aircraft registers, Robert David's F-AJIM, noted as a Bourgois-Senemaud 10, c/n.3

== Variants ==
AT.35
Original aircraft with Anzani engine. One built.
AT.40/ AT.1
AT.35 re-engined with Salmson plus two new examples.

== Specifications (AT.40/AT.1) ==
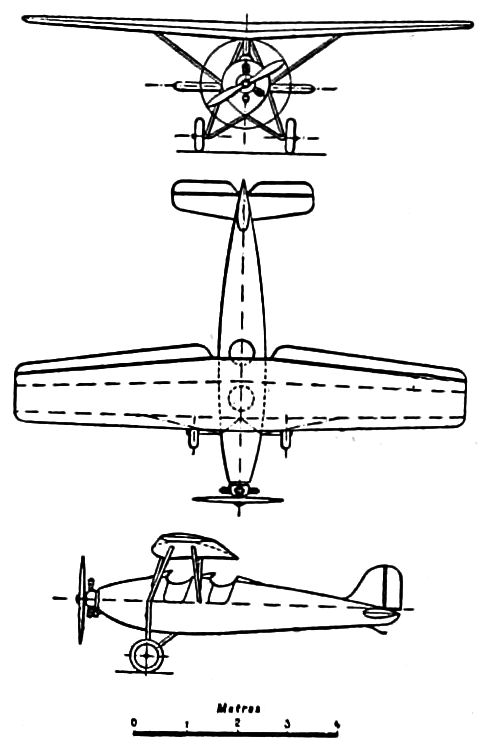
Bourgois-Sénémaud AT 35 3-view drawing from Aero Digest September 1928

Data from Les Ailes, May 1929

General characteristics

- Crew: One
- Capacity: One passenger
- Length: 6.40 m (21 ft 0 in)
- Wingspan: 8.85 m (29 ft 0 in)
- Height: 2.640 m (8 ft 8 in)
- Wing area: 13 m^{2} (140 sq ft)
- Empty weight: 300 kg (661 lb)
- Gross weight: 500 kg (1,102 lb)
- Fuel capacity: 70 L (15 imp gal; 18 US gal)
- Powerplant: 1 × Salmson 9Ad 9-cylinder air-cooled radial, 30 kW (40 hp)
- Propellers: 2-bladed wooden

Performance

- Maximum speed: 155 km/h (96 mph, 84 kn)
- Cruise speed: 125 km/h (78 mph, 67 kn)
- Stall speed: 75 km/h (47 mph, 40 kn) for AT.35, minimum speed.
- Range: 600 km (370 mi, 320 nmi) with one seat replaced by extra tanks:1,500 km (930 mi; 810 nmi)
- Service ceiling: 3,500 m (11,500 ft)
