= Blériot-SPAD S.72 =

1920s French aircraft

S.72

General information
- Type: Trainer aircraft
- Manufacturer: Blériot
- Primary user: French Air Force
- Number built: 1

History
- First flight: 15 April 1923

The Blériot-SPAD S.72 was a French one-seat, single-engine biplane flight training aircraft designed in the 1920s

== Design ==
The S.72 was a biplane of wood and metal construction.

== Specification ==
Data from

General characteristics

- Crew: One
- Length: 6.35 m (20 ft 10 in)
- Wingspan: 7.82 m (25 ft 8 in)
- Height: 2.60 m (8 ft 6 in)
- Wing area: 18.00 m^{2} (193.8 sq ft)
- Empty weight: 634 kg (1,398 lb)
- Gross weight: 874 kg (1,927 lb)
- Powerplant: 1 × Hispano-Suiza 8-cylinder V inline engine, 130 kW (180 hp)
- Propellers: 2-bladed

Performance

- Maximum speed: 189 km/h (117 mph, 102 kn)
