= Blériot XLIV =

1910s French aircraft

General information
- Type: Observation aircraft
- National origin: France
- Manufacturer: Recherches Aéronautique Louis Blériot
- Number built: 1

History
- First flight: 1913

The Bleriot XLIV was a single-seat observation monoplane designed in France by Louis Bleriot during the early 1910s.

== Specifications ==
Data from

General characteristics

- Crew: 2
- Length: 6.45 m (21 ft 2 in)
- Powerplant: 1 × Gnome Monosoupape 7 Type A 7-cylinder air-cooled rotary piston engine, 60 kW (80 hp)
- Propellers: 2-bladed
