= Blériot XLIII =

WWI French reconnaissance aircraft

General information
- Type: Reconnaissance
- National origin: France
- Manufacturer: Blériot
- Status: prototype only
- Number built: 1

History
- First flight: March 1913
- Variant: Bleriot XXXVI

The Blériot XLIII was a First World War French reconnaissance plane designed and built by Blériot.

== Design ==
The crew was located in the cabin in a tandem scheme. At the observer at the bottom of the window was added, providing a good overview. The Bleriot XLIII was a double mid-plane with a monocoque-type fuselage, equipped with an 80 hp Gnome 7A engine.

== Development ==
In March 1913, Louise Bleriot built the Bleriot XLIII a further development of the Bleriot XXXVI. The Bleriot XLIII could be used for long-distance reconnaissance, but mediocre flight characteristics did not allow Bleriot to conclude a contract for its mass production.

== Specifications ==
Data from Aviafrance : Aviafrance :Blériot XLIII, Airwar : Blériot XLIII

General characteristics

- Crew: 2
- Length: 6.02 m (19 ft 9 in)
- Wingspan: 10.10 m (33 ft 2 in)
- Height: 3.10 m (10 ft 2 in)
- Wing area: 19.30 m^{2} (207.7 sq ft)
- Gross weight: 350 kg (772 lb)
- Powerplant: 1 × Monosoupape 7 Type A 7-cylinder air-cooled rotary piston engine, 60 kW (80 hp)
- Propellers: 2-bladed fixed-pitch propeller

Performance

- Maximum speed: 125 km/h (78 mph, 67 kn)
- Cruise speed: 100 km/h (62 mph, 54 kn)
