= Boeing Model 42 =

American observation aircraft

Model 42

General information
- Type: observation
- National origin: United States
- Manufacturer: Boeing
- Number built: 3

History
- First flight: 6 February 1925
- Developed from: Airco DH-4M-1

The Boeing Model 42 (also Boeing XCO-7 for Experimental Corps Observation Model 7) was an American biplane aircraft developed from the Airco DH.4, taking advantage of the large number of aircraft left over after the end of World War I.

== Development and design ==
The Model 42 was essentially an Airco DH-4M-1 fitted with new Boeing tailplanes, tapered wings, and tripod landing gear. The first aircraft built, designated XCO-7, was used as a static test bed, and did not fly. The second aircraft, XCO-7A, used a standard DH-4M-1 fuselage and Liberty engine, with the Boeing modifications. The final aircraft, XCO-7B, added balanced elevators and inverted the Liberty engine. Both flyable aircraft were shipped to McCook Field, where the first flight occurred on 6 February 1925.

The performance of the new aircraft did not justify the cost of the conversion, and Boeing abandoned the project.

== Specifications (XCO-7A) ==
Data from Bowers, 1966. pg. 60.

General characteristics

- Crew: 2
- Length: 29 ft 2 in (8.89 m)
- Wingspan: 45 ft 0 in (13.7 m)
- Height: 10 ft 8 in (3.25 m)
- Wing area: 440 sq ft (40.9 m^{2})
- Empty weight: 3,107 lb (1,409 kg)
- Gross weight: 4,665 lb (2,116 kg)
- Powerplant: 1 × Liberty L-12A , 420 hp (310 kW)

Performance

- Maximum speed: 112 mph (180 km/h, 97 kn)
- Cruise speed: 110 mph (177 km/h, 96 kn)
- Range: 420 mi (676 km, 360 nmi)
- Service ceiling: 13,050 ft (3,977 m)

Armament

- 4x 0.30 cal machine guns
