= BFW CL.I =

CL.I

General information
- Type: Escort Fighter/Ground Attack Aircraft
- Manufacturer: Bayerische Flugzeugwerke (BFW)
- Primary user: Imperial German Army Air Service
- Number built: 2 × CL.I/CL.II, 1 × CL.III

History
- First flight: April 1918 (CL.I); July 1918 (CL.II)

The BFW CL.I was a prototype German escort fighter aircraft of World War I.

== Design and development ==
The CL.I first flew April 1918, but was considered to be inferior in performance to the Hannover CL.V. Thus, improvements were made and the aircraft was returned to BFW, fitted with a lighter fuselage and redesignated CL.Ia. Results of tests performed on 14 September 1918 were declared unsatisfactory. BFW commenced a redesign of the CL.Ia to produce an entirely new aircraft, the CL.III, of which a single prototype was built but not flown due to the Armistice of November 1918. A further development of the BFW CL.III, the CL.IV, remained a paper project only.

The second CL.I prototype (known as Type 18 by BFW) was fitted with a 175 hp (130 kW) MAN Mana III six-cylinder in-line engine and designated CL.II, with test flights in July 1918.

== Variants ==
CL.I
(company designation BFW type 17) the initial design; two built
CL.Ia
with lighter fuselage; one converted from a CL.I
CL.II
(company designation BFW type 18) one of the CL.Is fitted with a 175 hp (130 kW) MAN Mana III engine
CL.III
Re-design of the CL.Ia; one built.
CL.IV
further development not completed before the armistice.

== Specifications (CL.Ia) ==
General characteristics

- Crew: 2
- Length: 7.81 m (25 ft 7 in)
- Wingspan: 10.62 m (34 ft 10 in)
- Empty weight: 720 kg (1,587 lb)
- Gross weight: 1,060 kg (2,337 lb)
- Powerplant: 1 × Mercedes D.III 6-cylinder water-cooled in-line piston engine, 120 kW (160 hp)

Performance

- Time to altitude: 1,000 m (3,300 ft) in 2 minutes; 4,000 m (13,000 ft) in 6.5 minutes

Armament

- Guns:

1-2 × 7.92 mm (0.312 in) LMG 08/15 "Spandau" machine gun, synchronized
1 × 7.92 mm (0.312 in) Parabellum MG14 machine gun, on ring mount for observer
