= Boeing XP-15 =

Fighter aircraft prototype by Boeing

XP-15 / XF5B-1
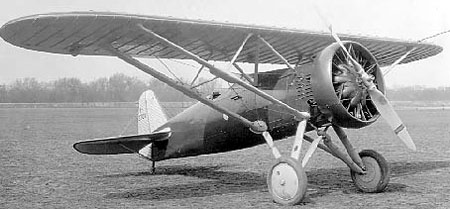
- The sole XP-15

General information
- Type: Fighter
- National origin: United States
- Manufacturer: Boeing
- Status: XP-15 - Destroyed
- Primary users: United States Army Air Corps United States Navy
- Number built: 2 (1 XP-15, 1 XF5B-1)

History
- First flight: XP-15 - 30 January 1930; XF5B-1 - February 1930

The Boeing XP-15 was an American prototype monoplane fighter.

== Design and development ==
This aircraft was essentially a monoplane version of the Boeing P-12, differing in having the lower wing omitted and in having all-metal construction as well as altered ailerons. The XP-15 had a split-axle undercarriage and a tail wheel.

Boeing numbered the craft as its Model 202; while the United States Army accepted it for testing and designated it as XP-15, they never actually purchased it, and it retained its civil registration of X-270V.

== Operational history ==
The XP-15 first flew in January 1930, when it was discovered that the vertical stabilizer (a P-12C type) needed to be larger in order to compensate for the single wing. Initial testing showed a top speed to 178 mph, but with enlarged tail surfaces and a Townend cowling, it recorded 190 mph at 8,000 ft. The aircraft performed poorly, with a poor rate of climb and a high landing speed. The USAAC did not order the aircraft for production and on 7 February 1931, the prototype was destroyed when a propeller blade failed and the engine tore loose from its mounts.

The Navy was offered the similar Model 205. It first flew in February 1930. One was bought by the US Navy as the XF5B-1, but by the time flight testing was complete in 1932, other aircraft were ordered instead.

== Variants ==
XP-15
1 built
XF5B-1
1 built

== Operators ==
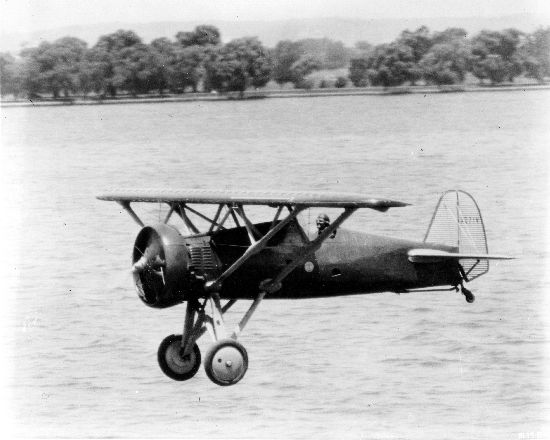
The XF5B-1

United States

- United States Army Air Corps
- United States Navy

== Specifications (XP-15) ==
Data from Angelucci 1987, pp. 81–82.

General characteristics

- Crew: one
- Length: 21 ft 0 in (6.40 m)
- Wingspan: 30 ft 6 in (9.29 m)
- Height: 9 ft 4.5 in (2.84 m)
- Wing area: 157.3 sq ft (14.61 m^{2})
- Empty weight: 2,052 lb (931 kg)
- Gross weight: 2,746 lb (1,246 kg)
- Powerplant: 1 × Pratt & Whitney SR-1340D Wasp , 525 hp (391 kW)

Performance

- Maximum speed: 190.2 mph (306 km/h, 165.3 kn)
- Cruise speed: 160 mph (257 km/h, 140 kn)
- Range: 420 mi (676 km, 360 nmi)
- Service ceiling: 27,650 ft (8,428 m)
- Rate of climb: 1,800 ft/min (9.15 m/s)

Armament

- 2 x .30 inch machine guns

== See also ==
Related development

- Boeing P-12

Related lists

- List of military aircraft of the United States
- List of fighter aircraft
