= Blériot-SPAD S.54 =

1920s French trainer aircraft

S.54
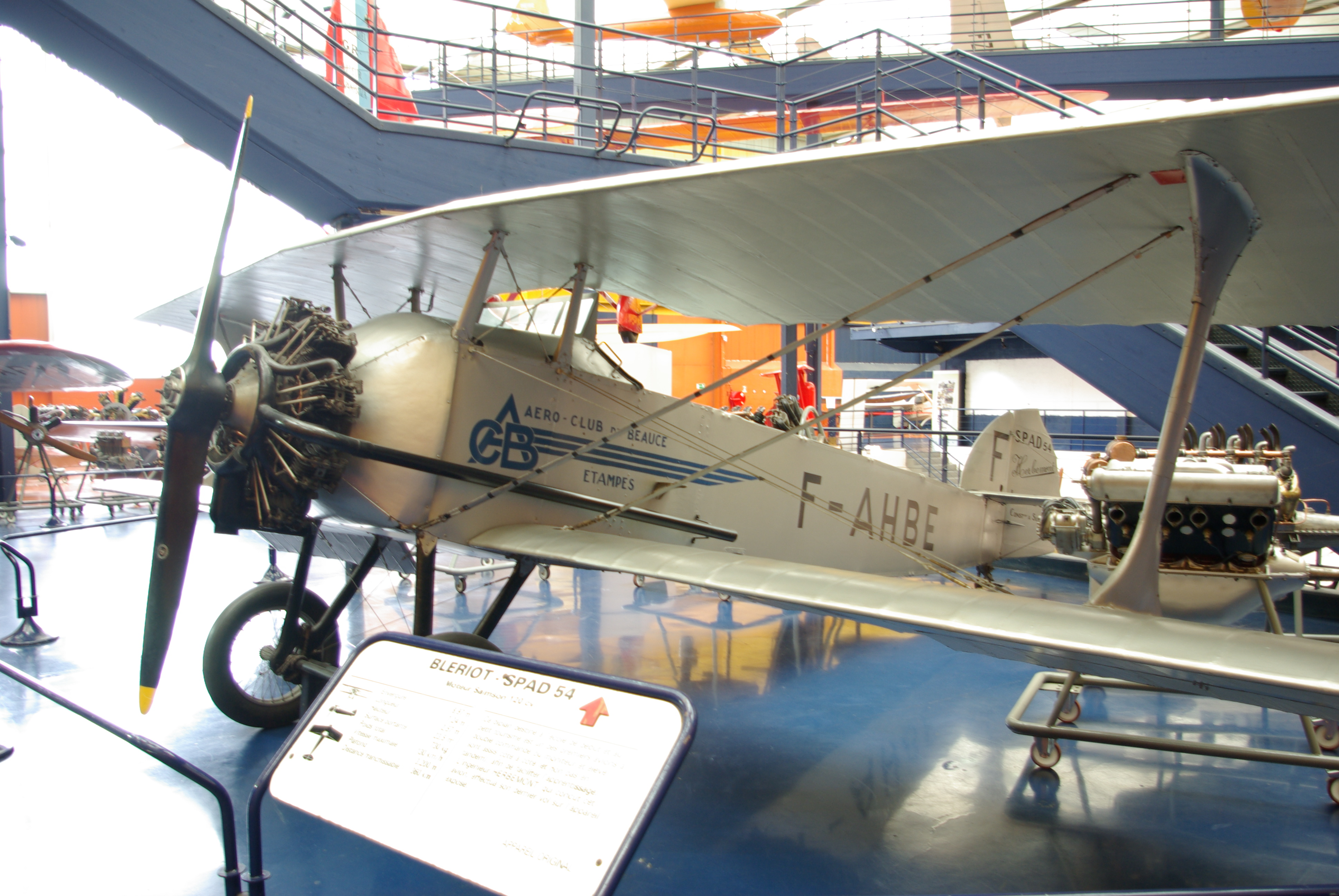
- An S.54 at the Musée de l'Air et de l'Espace du Bourget

General information
- Type: biplane trainer
- National origin: France
- Manufacturer: SPAD
- Designer: Louis Béchéreau
- Primary user: Aéronautique Militaire
- Number built: 25

History
- First flight: 23 February 1922

The SPAD S.54 was a French biplane trainer aircraft of the early 1920s, developed by Société Pour L'Aviation et ses Dérivés (SPAD).

== Specifications ==
Data from

General characteristics

- Crew: 1
- Length: 7.24 m (23 ft 9 in)
- Wingspan: 8.96 m (29 ft 5 in)
- Height: 2.57 m (8 ft 5 in)
- Wing area: 23.52 m^{2} (253.2 sq ft)
- Empty weight: 520 kg (1,146 lb)
- Gross weight: 757 kg (1,669 lb)
- Powerplant: 1 × Clerget 9B 9-cylinder air-cooled rotary piston engine, 97 kW (130 hp)

Performance

- Maximum speed: 120 km/h (75 mph, 65 kn)
