= Blériot-SPAD S.71 =

1920s French fighter aircraft

S.71

General information
- Type: Fighter
- Manufacturer: Blériot
- Primary user: Aéronautique Militaire
- Number built: 1

History
- First flight: 14 January 1923

The Blériot-SPAD S.71 was a French fighter aircraft developed in the early 1920s.

== Design and development ==
The S.71 was a single-seat fighter plane of all-wood construction with jointed fabric.

== Specifications ==
Data from

General characteristics

- Crew: 1
- Length: 7.3 m (23 ft 11 in)
- Wingspan: 8.72 m (28 ft 7 in)
- Height: 2.8 m (9 ft 2 in)
- Wing area: 30 m^{2} (320 sq ft)
- Empty weight: 867 kg (1,911 lb)
- Gross weight: 1,306 kg (2,879 lb)
- Powerplant: 1 × Hispano-Suiza 8Fb V-8 water-cooled piston engine, 220 kW (300 hp)

Performance

- Maximum speed: 237 km/h (147 mph, 128 kn)

== Bibliography ==
- Bruner, Georges (1977). "Fighters a la Francaise, Part One". Air Enthusiast (3): 85–95. ISSN 0143-5450.
