= Boeing Model 7 =

Model 7
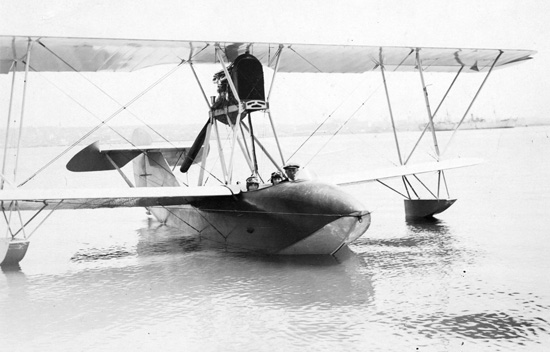

General information
- Type: utility flying boat
- Manufacturer: Boeing

History
- First flight: 7 January 1920

The Boeing Model 7, a.k.a. Boeing BB-1 was an American biplane flying boat aircraft built by Boeing in the 1920s. The pilot and two passengers all sat in the cockpit, with the passengers right behind the pilot.

== Specifications (variant) ==
Data from Bowers

General characteristics

- Crew: 1 pilot
- Capacity: 2 passengers
- Length: 27 ft 8 in (8.4 m)
- Wingspan: 45 ft 6 in (13.8 m)
- Height: 11 ft 8 in (5.5 m)
- Wing area: 403 sq ft (37.4 m^{2})
- Empty weight: 2,028 lb (920 kg)
- Gross weight: 2,699 lb (1,224 kg)
- Powerplant: 1 × Hall-Scott L-4 , 130 hp (97 kW)

Performance

- Maximum speed: 84 mph (135 km/h, 73 kn)
- Cruise speed: 75 mph (121 km/h, 65 kn)
- Range: 500 mi (800 km, 430 nmi)
- Service ceiling: 10,000 ft (3,000 m)
