= Blériot-SPAD S.62 =

1920s French aircraft

S.62

General information
- Type: Trainer aircraft
- Manufacturer: Blériot
- Number built: 1

History
- First flight: 13 April 1923

The Blériot-SPAD S.62 was a French one-seat, single-engine biplane flight training aircraft designed in the 1920s. It was presented at the Military Airplane School Contest of 1923.

== Design ==
The S.62 was a biplane of wood and canvas construction.

== Specification ==
Data from

General characteristics

- Crew: One
- Length: 6.77 m (22 ft 3 in)
- Wingspan: 8.65 m (28 ft 5 in)
- Height: 2.80 m (9 ft 2 in)
- Wing area: 23.70 m^{2} (255.1 sq ft)
- Empty weight: 717 kg (1,581 lb)
- Gross weight: 1,025 kg (2,260 lb)
- Powerplant: 1 × Hispano-Suiza 8Ab V-8 water-cooled piston engine, 130 kW (180 hp)
- Propellers: 2-bladed

Performance

- Maximum speed: 180 km/h (110 mph, 97 kn)
