= Blériot-SPAD S.37 =

1920s French aircraft

General information
- Type: Airliner
- Manufacturer: Blériot
- Number built: 1

History
- First flight: 9 September 1920

The Bleriot-SPAD S.37 was a small French airliner developed soon after World War I.

== Design ==
The S.37 was a sedan-style airliner where the passengers were placed in open cabin in front of the pilot.

== Specifications ==
Data from

General characteristics

- Crew: 1
- Capacity: 3 pax
- Length: 7.30 m (23 ft 11 in)
- Wingspan: 9.72 m (31 ft 11 in)
- Height: 2.80 m (9 ft 2 in)
- Wing area: 31.5 m^{2} (339 sq ft)
- Empty weight: 1,066 kg (2,350 lb)
- Gross weight: 1,716 kg (3,783 lb)
- Powerplant: 1 × Hispano-Suiza 8Fa 8-cylinder V inline engine, 200 kW (270 hp)
- Propellers: 2-bladed fixed-pitch propeller

Performance

- Maximum speed: 190 km/h (120 mph, 100 kn)

== See also ==
Related development

- S.27
