= Blériot-SPAD S.39 =

1920s French aircraft

SPAD S.39
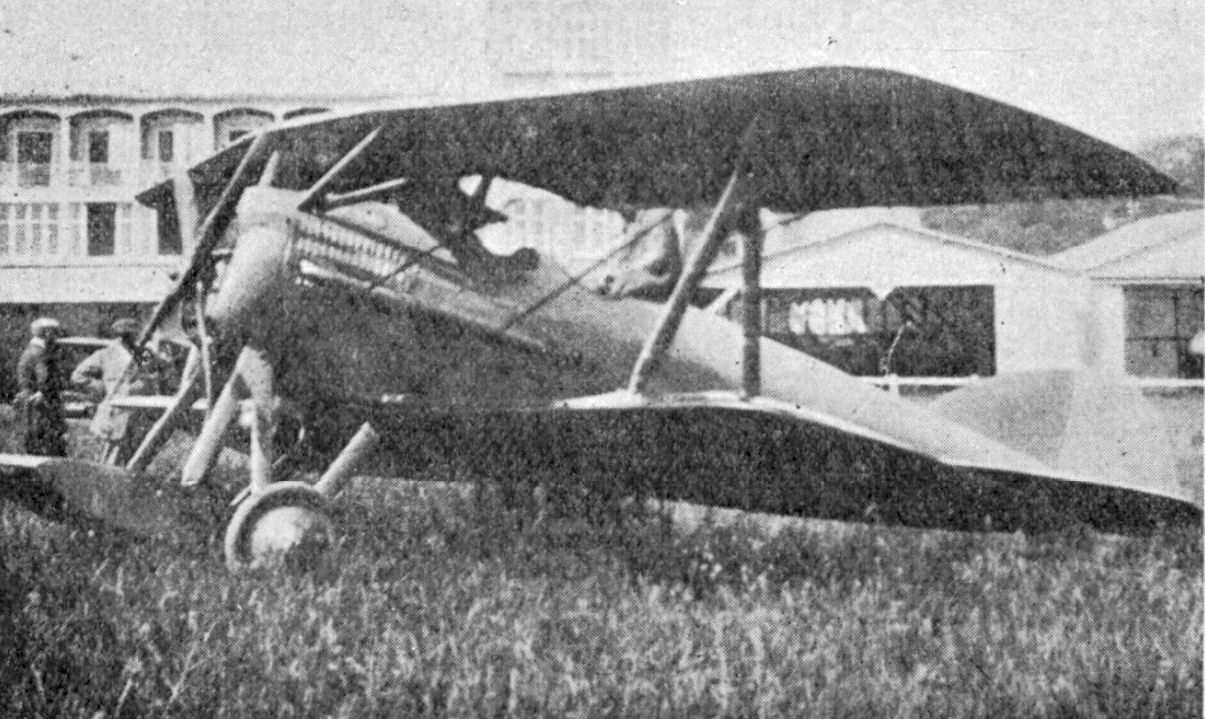

General information
- Type: Reconnaissance aircraft
- National origin: France
- Manufacturer: SPAD
- Number built: 2

History
- First flight: 1 June 1921

The Bleriot-SPAD S.39 was a French carrier-borne reconnaissance aircraft built in the early 1920s.

== Design ==
The S.39 was a biplane with monocoque fuselage and wood and canvas wings. The undercarriage featured a hydroplane / flotation device.

== Specifications ==
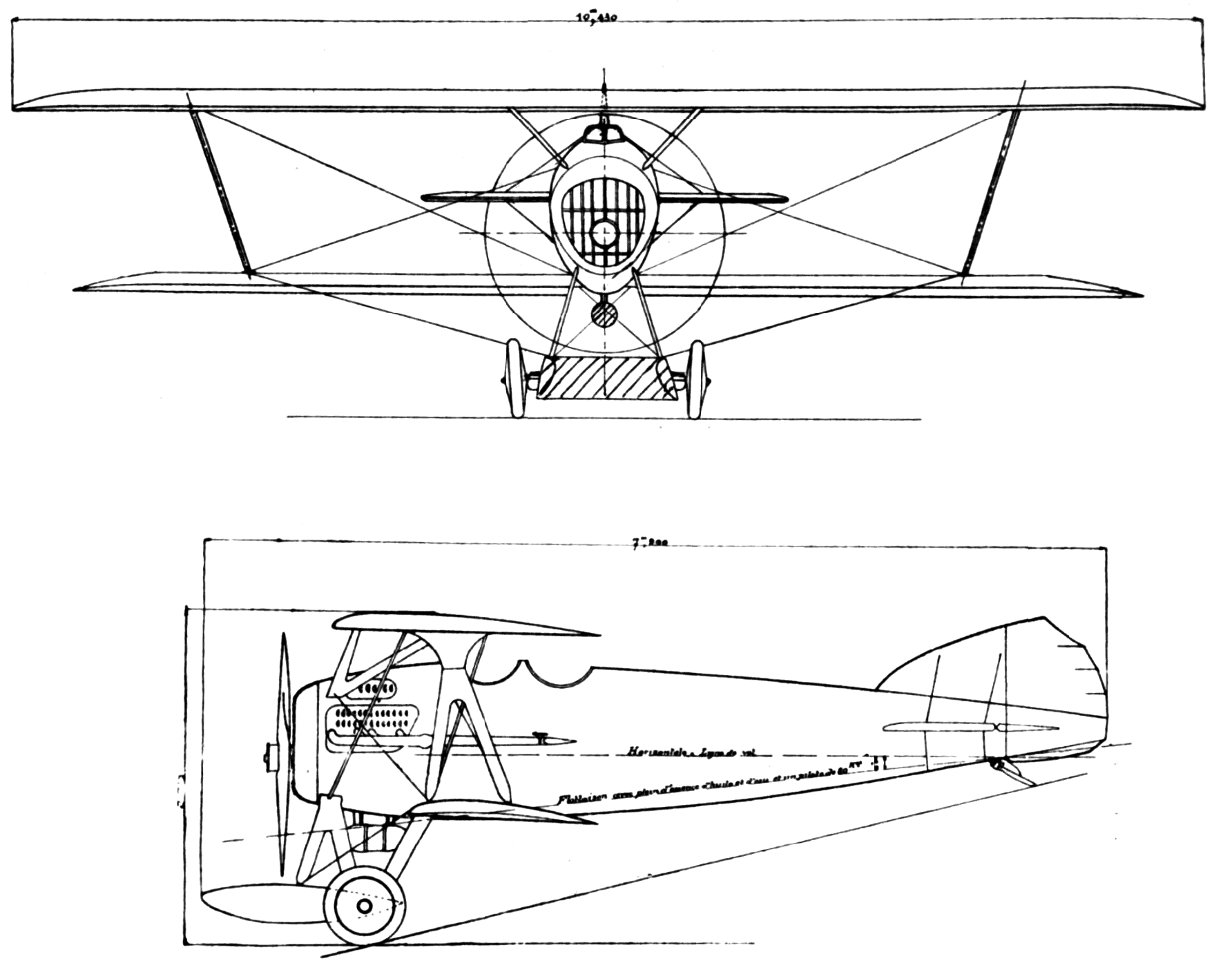
3-view

Data from

General characteristics

- Crew: 2
- Length: 7.83 m (25 ft 8 in)
- Wingspan: 10.43 m (34 ft 3 in)
- Height: 2.93 m (9 ft 7 in)
- Wing area: 33.00 m^{2} (355.2 sq ft)
- Empty weight: 1,028 kg (2,266 lb)
- Gross weight: 1,520 kg (3,351 lb)
- Powerplant: 1 × Hispano-Suiza , 205 kW (275 hp)
- Propellers: 2-bladed fixed pitchpropeller

Performance

- Maximum speed: 220 km/h (140 mph, 120 kn)

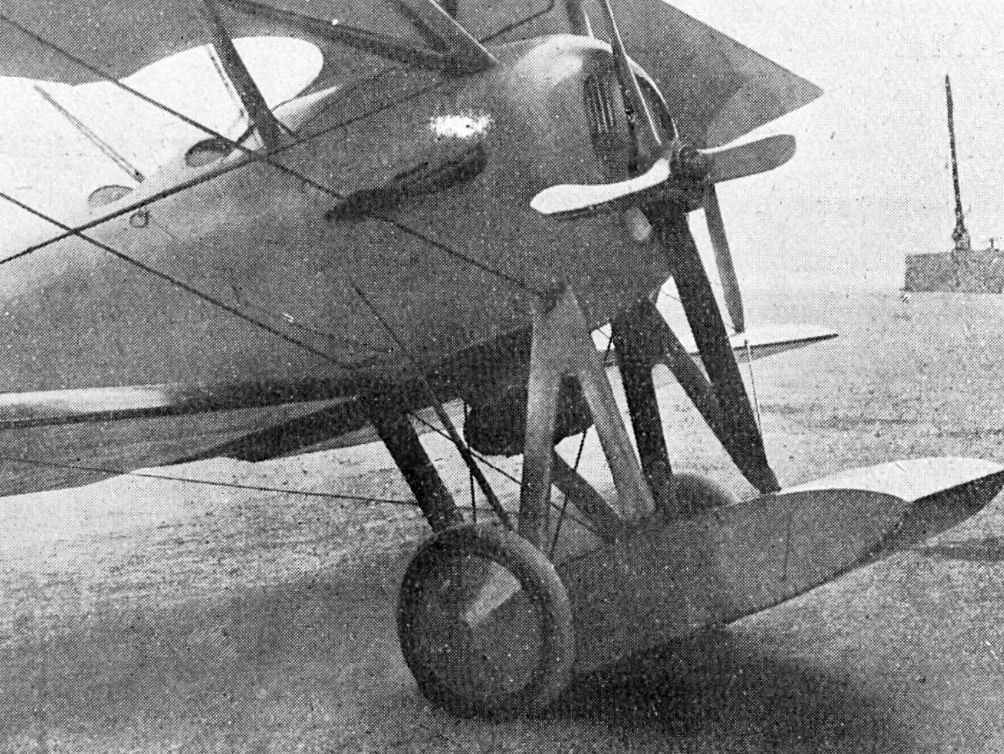
Detail showing the hydroplane on the undercarriage

== See also ==
Related lists

- List of Interwar military aircraft
