= Blériot-SPAD S.92 =

1920s French aircraft

S.92
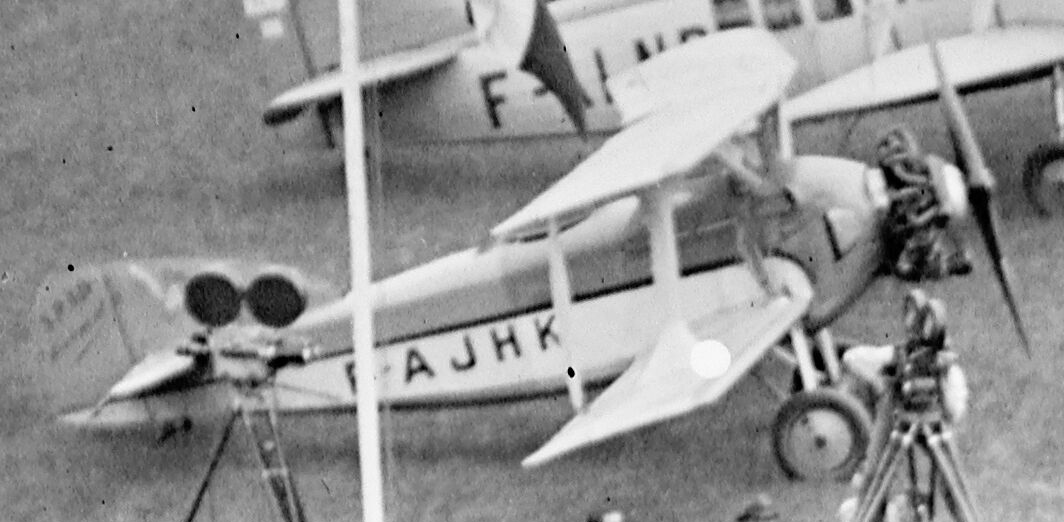
- A Blériot-SPAD S.92 in 1934.

General information
- Type: Trainer aircraft
- Manufacturer: Blériot
- Primary user: French Air Force
- Number built: 15

History
- First flight: 21 August 1928

The Blériot-SPAD S.92 was a French one-seat, single-engine biplane flight training aircraft designed in the 1920s

== Design ==
The S.92 was a biplane of wood and metal construction.

== Operators ==
France

- Aéronautique Militaire

== Specification ==
Data from

General characteristics

- Crew: One
- Length: 7.10 m (23 ft 4 in)
- Wingspan: 10.00 m (32 ft 10 in)
- Height: 3.00 m (9 ft 10 in)
- Wing area: 26.15 m^{2} (281.5 sq ft)
- Empty weight: 854 kg (1,883 lb)
- Gross weight: 1,077 kg (2,374 lb)
- Powerplant: 1 × Hispano-Suiza 8Ab 8-cylinder V inline engine, 130 kW (180 hp)
- Propellers: 2-bladed

Performance

- Maximum speed: 161 km/h (100 mph, 87 kn)
- Time to altitude: 17 min 7 s to 2,000 m (6,600 ft)
