= Blériot-SPAD S.64 =

1920s French aircraft

S.64

General information
- Type: Trainer aircraft
- Manufacturer: Blériot
- Number built: 1

History
- First flight: 5 April 1923

The Blériot-SPAD S.64 was a French two-seat, single-engine biplane flight training aircraft designed in the 1920s.

== Design ==
The S.64 was a biplane of wood and canvas construction.

== Specification ==
Data from

General characteristics

- Crew: Two
- Length: 7.25 m (23 ft 9 in)
- Wingspan: 8.96 m (29 ft 5 in)
- Height: 2.84 m (9 ft 4 in)
- Wing area: 23.52 m^{2} (253.2 sq ft)
- Empty weight: 511 kg (1,127 lb)
- Gross weight: 761 kg (1,678 lb)
- Powerplant: 1 × Le Rhône 9C 9-cylinder air-cooled rotary piston engine, 60 kW (80 hp)
- Propellers: 2-bladed

Performance

- Maximum speed: 130 km/h (81 mph, 70 kn)
