= List of aircraft of the French Air Force during World War II =

Aircraft of the French Air Force and Naval Aviation during the Phoney War and the Battle of France, and aircraft of the Free French Air Force (FAFL).

The list is not complete and includes obsolete aircraft used for training as well as prototype and pre-production aircraft.

List is in alphabetical order by manufacturer or designer.

== Aircraft of the Armée de l'Air, 1939–1940 and Armée de l'Air de l'Armistice, 1940–1942 ==
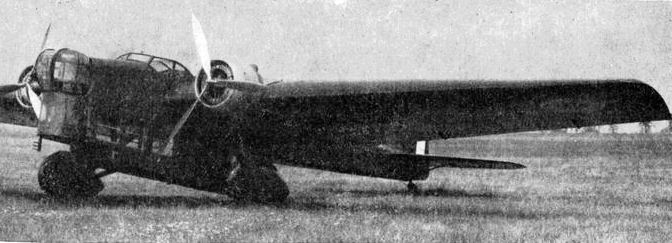
The Amiot 143 was used as a medium bomber in the Battle of France

=== Amiot ===
- Amiot 143 medium bomber
- Amiot 351/Amiot 354 twin-engine light bomber

=== ANF Les Mureaux ===
- ANF Les Mureaux 113/115/117 reconnaissance aircraft

=== Arsenal ===
- Arsenal VG-33 light wooden-built fighter for rapid production, only few built and used.

=== Besson ===
- MB.411 submarine-borne floatplane operated by French submarine Surcouf

=== Blériot-SPAD ===
- Blériot-SPAD S.510 biplane fighter, mostly used for training by the time of the beginning of the war.

=== Bloch ===
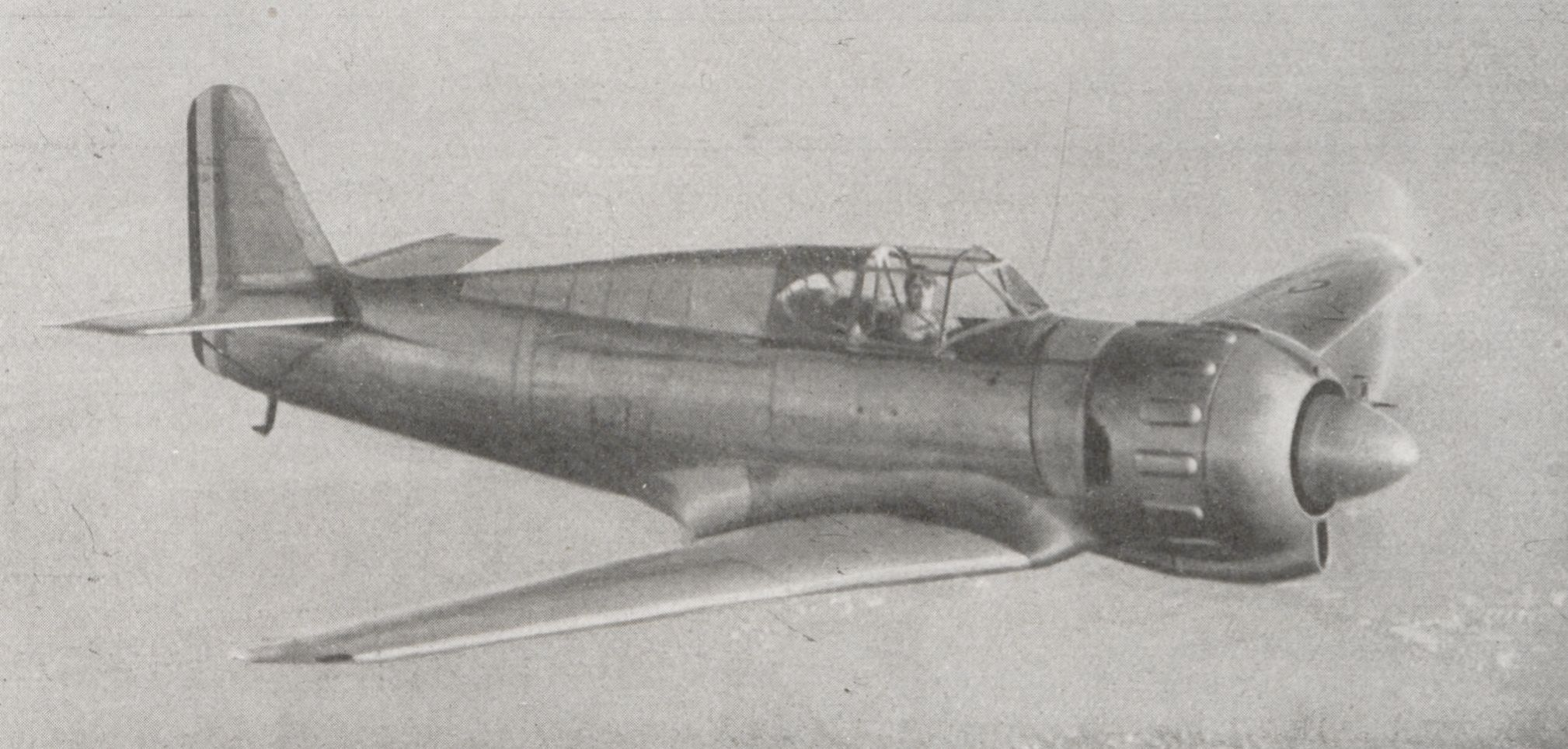
- Bloch MB.151 fighter of the MB.150 series
  MB.81 transport
- MB.131 reconnaissance/bomber
- MB.150 series fighters
  - MB.150 1936 prototype
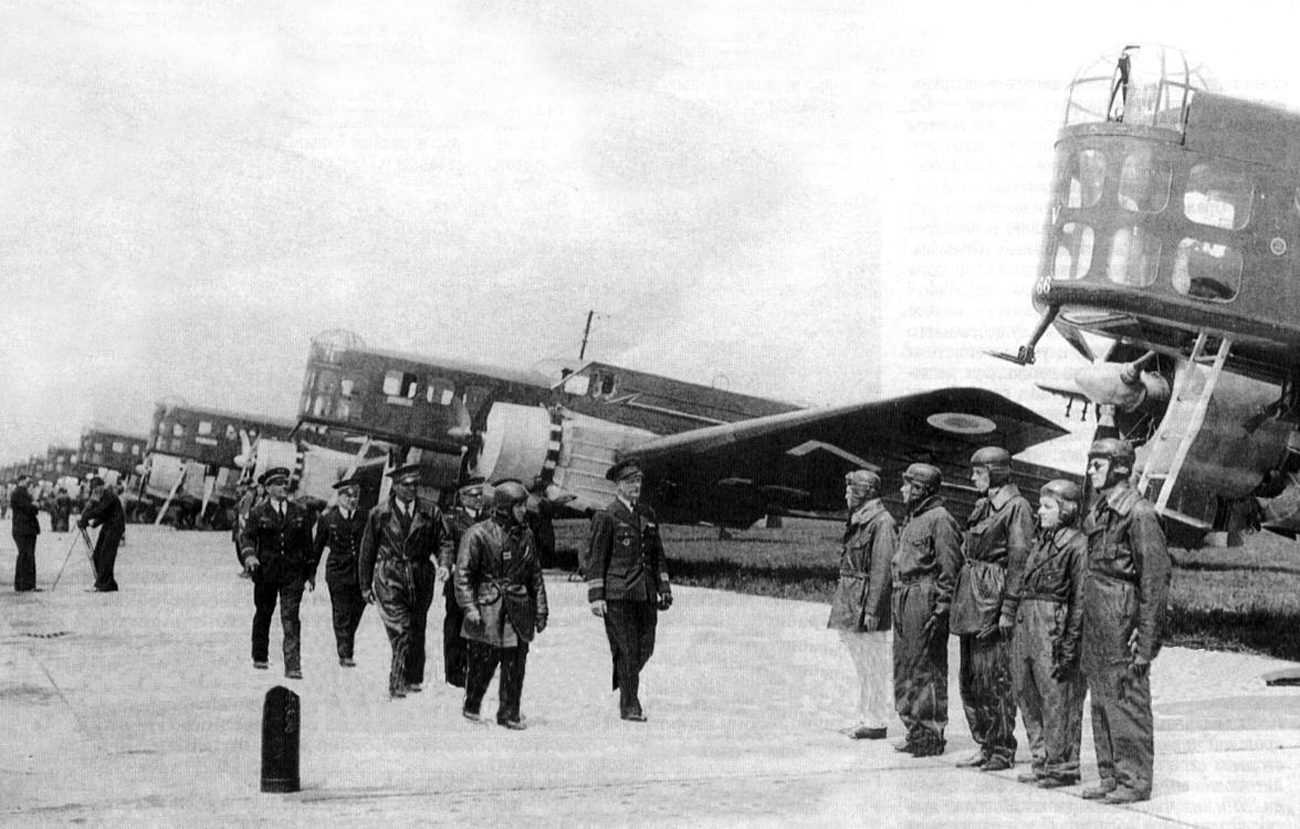
  - Bloch 210 bombers used by the French air force during the Battle of France
    MB.151 first production variant, 140 built
  - MB.152 increased power, 430 built
  - MB.155 improved aerodynamics, at least 45 built
- MB.162 long-range heavy bomber
- MB.174 reconnaissance
- MB.175 bomber
- MB.200 bomber
- MB.210 bomber
- MB.220 transport
- MB.700 prototype light fighter, one completed

=== Breguet ===
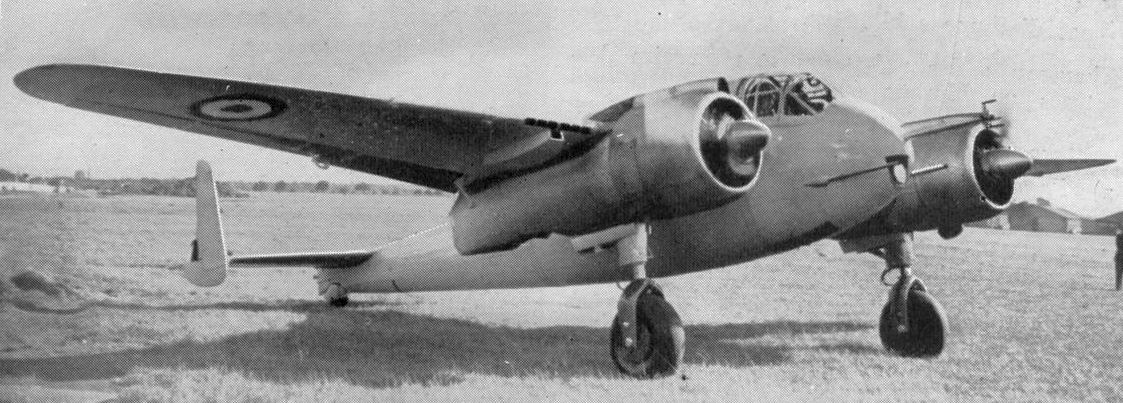
Breguet 690 ground attack aircraft series, introduced into the Armée de l'Air (French Air force) in 1939. Only available in small numbers during the Battle of France.

- Bre.270 observation
- Bre.482 heavy bomber, single complete prototype destroyed in German air raid in 1942
- Bre.521 "Bizerte" - flying boat
- Bre.691 twin engine light ground attack bomber
- Bre.693 Bre.691 with different engines
- Bre.695 Bre.693 with larger engines

=== CAMS ===
- CAMS 37 ship-borne flying boat
- CAMS 55 maritime reconnaissance flying boat

=== Caproni (Italian) ===
- Caproni Ca.164 trainer
- Caproni Ca.313 bomber

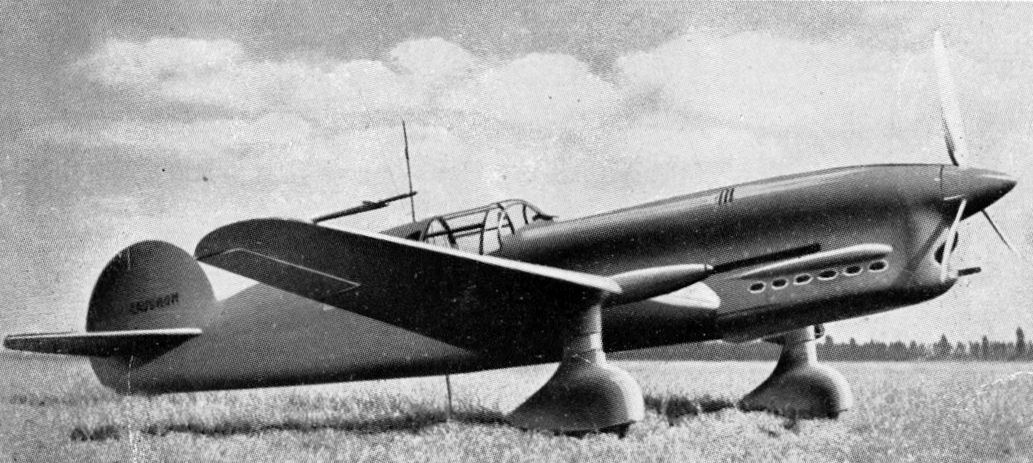
Caudron 710 series aircraft or Caudron Cyclone. The C714 variant was used by Polish pilots during the Battle of France

=== Caudron ===
- C.272 Luciole liaison
- C.400 Phalène liaison
- C.445 Goeland liaison/transport
- C.600 Aiglon liaison
- C.630 Simoun transport
- C.714 Cyclone light fighter

=== Curtiss (American) ===
- H-75 fighter
- CW-77 dive bomber

=== de Havilland (British) ===
- DH.82 Tiger Moth trainer
- DH.89 Dragon Rapide transport

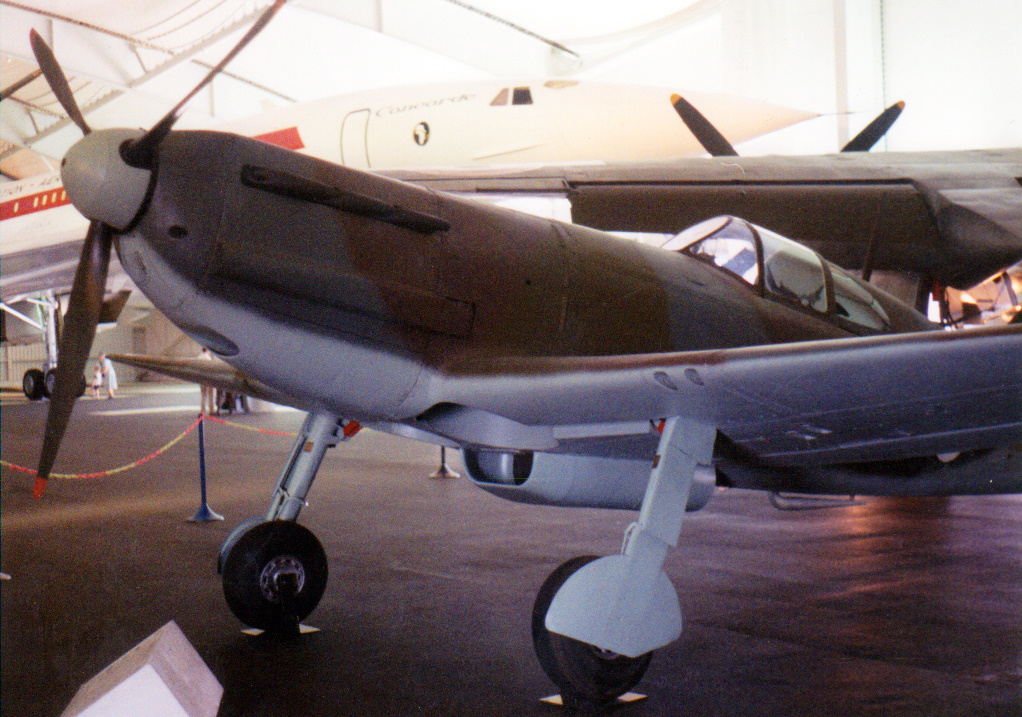
Dewoitine D.520 fighter used during the Battle of France. Used afterwards by the Vichy French Air Force

=== Dewoitine ===
- Dewoitine D.338 transport
- D.500/D.501/D.510 fighter
- D.520 fighter
- D.720 reconnaissance
- HD.730 reconnaissance floatplane

=== Douglas ===
- DB-7 bomber

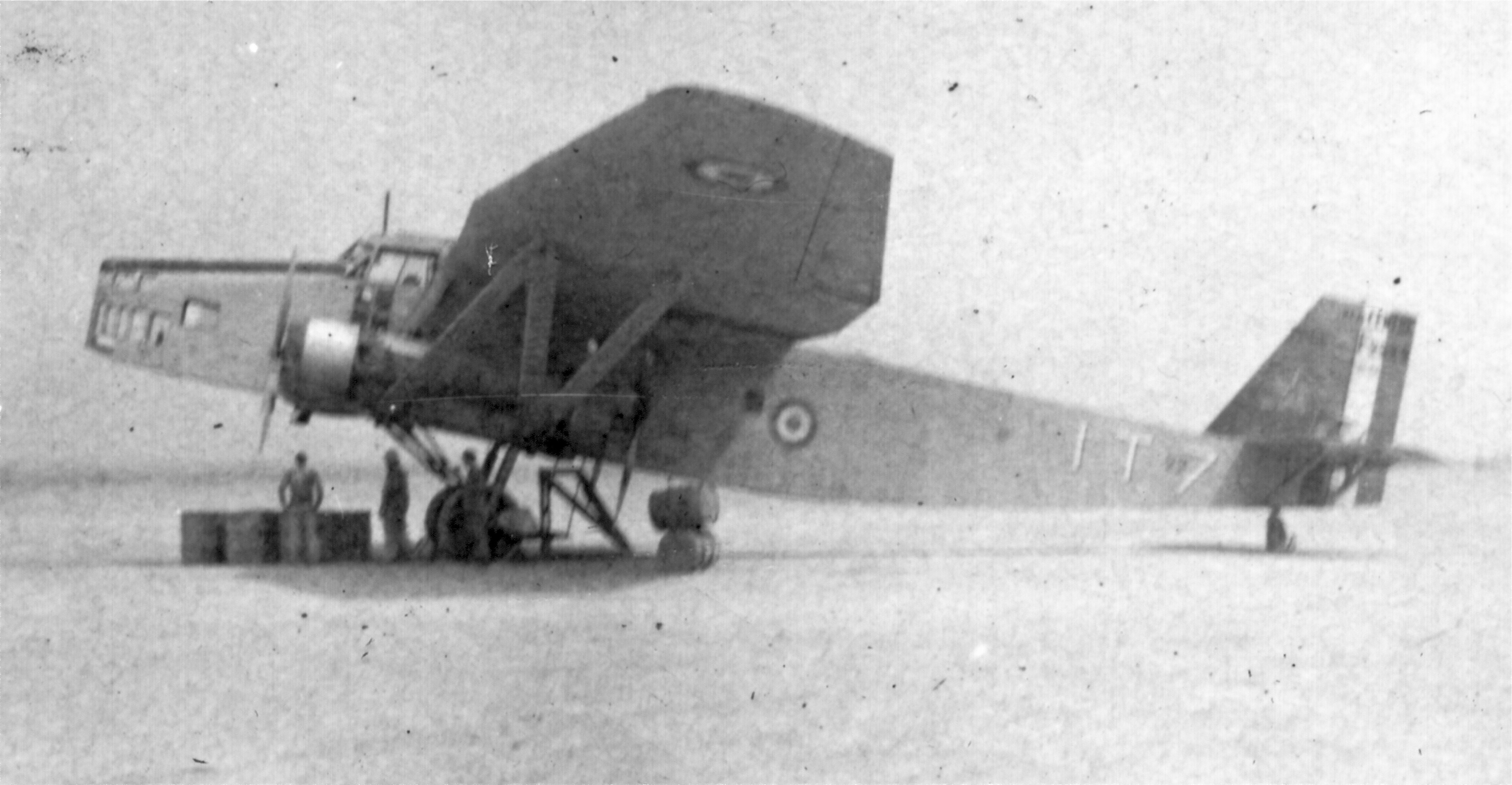
The Farman F.222 was the main production variant of the Farman F.220 aircraft series, which served as bombers during the Battle of France. It was the largest French bomber of the interwar period, and was thus classified as a heavy bomber.

=== Farman/SNCAC ===
- F.190 transport
- F.222 heavy bomber/transport
- F.223 heavy bomber
- F.224 transport
- F.402 transport and observation
- NC.150 high altitude bomber prototype
- NC.223 heavy bomber
- NC.410 floatplane prototype
- NC.470 trainer
- NC-600 twin-engine fighter prototype

=== Gourdou-Leseurre ===
- GL-812 HY ship-borne observation floatplane
- GL-813 HY ship-borne observation floatplane
- GL-832 HY ship-borne observation floatplane

=== Hanriot ===
- H.436 trainer
- H.16 liaison
- H.185 liaison
- H.232 advanced trainer
- H.180 trainer
- H.220 fighter-bomber
- H.230 trainer
- H.510 observation

=== Koolhoven (Netherlands) ===
- FK.58 fighter, about 13 pressed into action in May 1940

=== Latécoère ===
- Laté.298 torpedo bomber floatplane
- Laté.299 reconnaissance/torpedo bomber landplane
- Laté.302 long range flying boat
- Laté.381 long range flying boat
- Laté.523 long range flying boat
- Laté.570 bomber
- Laté.611 long range flying boat
- Laté.631 long range flying boat

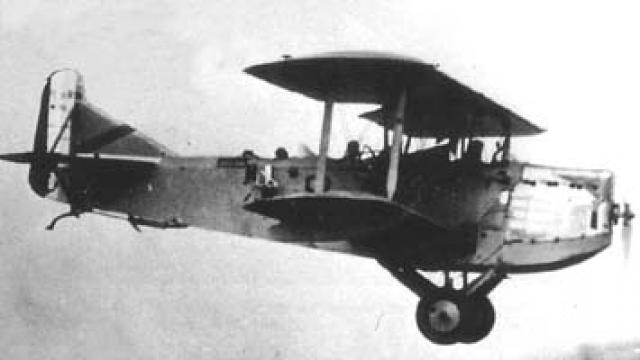
Levasseur PL.10 carrier-borne reconnaissance aircraft. Later developed into the improved Levasseur PL.10 1 variant and Levasseur PL.107 carrier torpedo bomber variant

=== Levasseur ===
- PL.10 torpedo bomber
- PL.101 torpedo bomber
- PL.14 torpedo bomber floatplane
- PL.15 torpedo bomber floatplane

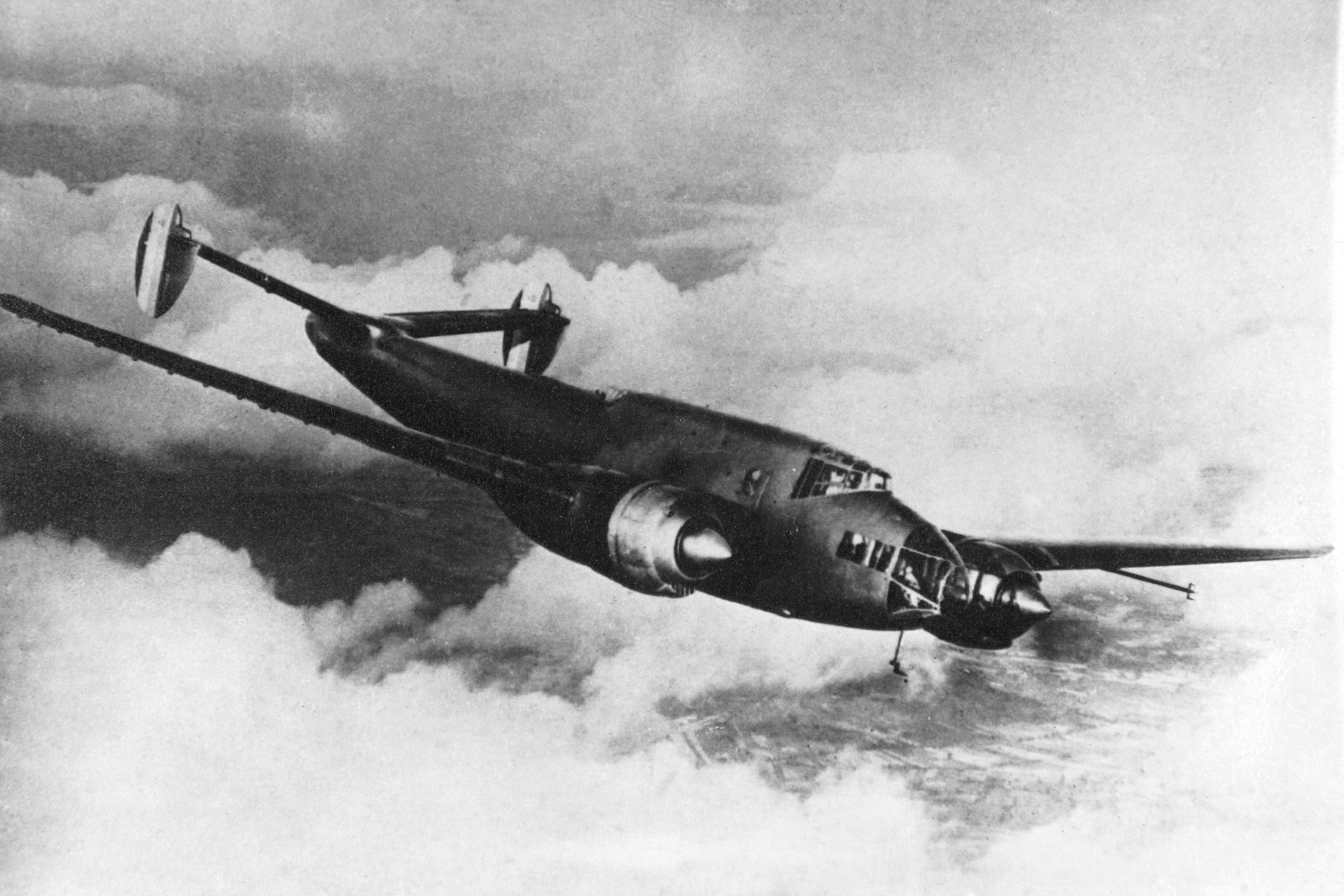
Lioré-et-Olivier LeO 451 medium bomber used in battle of France

=== Lioré et Olivier ===
- LeO C.30 Cierva observation autogyro
- LeO H-43 observation float plane
- Lioré et Olivier LeO.206 biplane heavy night bomber
- LeO H-246 flying boat
- LeO H-257 torpedo bomber/bomber float plane
- LeO.451 bomber
- LeO H-470 flying boat

=== Loire ===
- Loire 46 fighter
- Loire 501 liaison
- Loire 70 flying boat
- Loire 130 flying boat
- Loire 210 ship-borne fighter floatplane

=== Loire-Nieuport ===
- LN.401 ship-borne dive bomber
- LN.411 ship-borne dive bomber

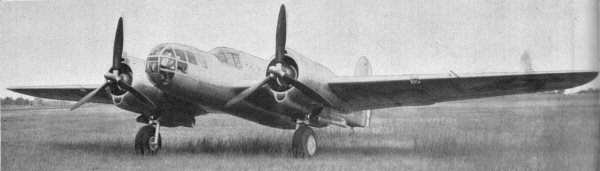
Martin 167 bought from the US by France to fill a shortage of modern bombers. Used in the Battle of France

=== SFCA Maillet ===
- Maillet 201 liaison

=== Martin (American) ===
- M.167 bomber

=== Mauboussin ===
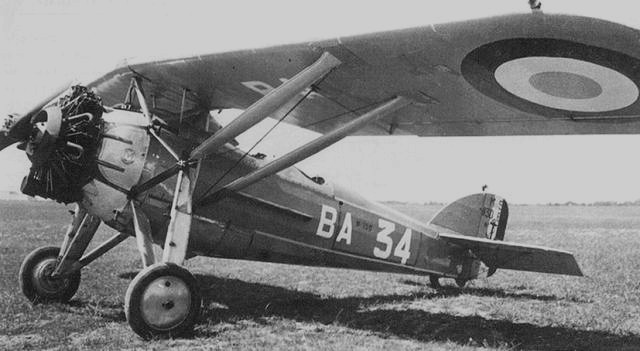
- The Morane-Saulnier 230 was the primary elementary trainer of the French air force in the 1930s.
  Mauboussin M.123 trainer

=== Morane-Saulnier ===
- MS.225 fighter
- MS.230 trainer
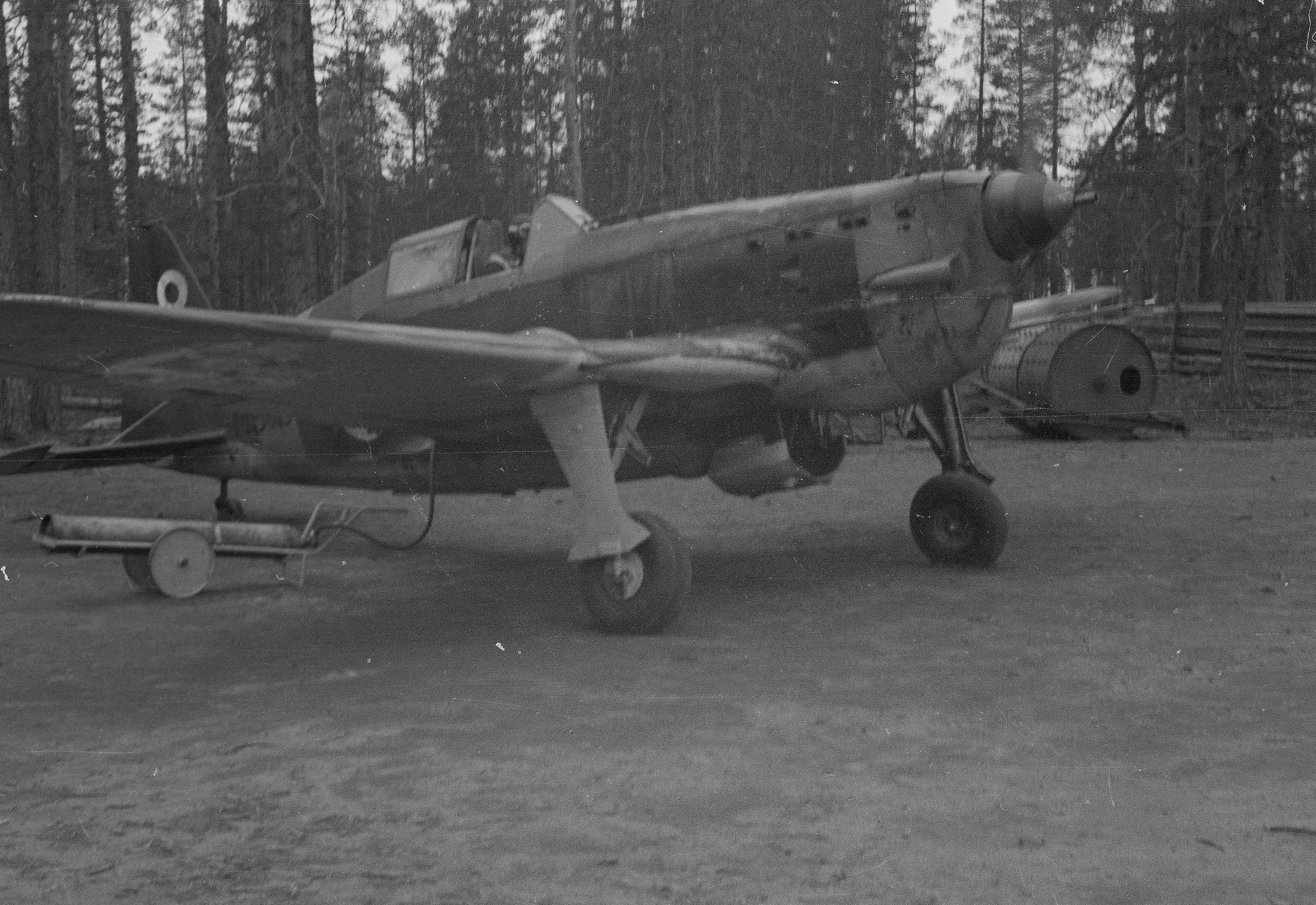
- The Morane-Saulnier MS.406 was the most numerous French fighter type during the Battle of France. One of only two French military designs of the period to exceed 1,000 aircraft produced, the other being the Potez 630
  MS.315 trainer
- MS.406 fighter

=== Nardi (Italian) ===
- Nardi FN.305 trainer/liaison

=== Nieuport-Delage ===
- NiD.622 fighter
- NiD.629 fighter

=== North American (American) ===
- NAA-57 trainer/reconnaissance
- NAA-64 trainer/reconnaissance

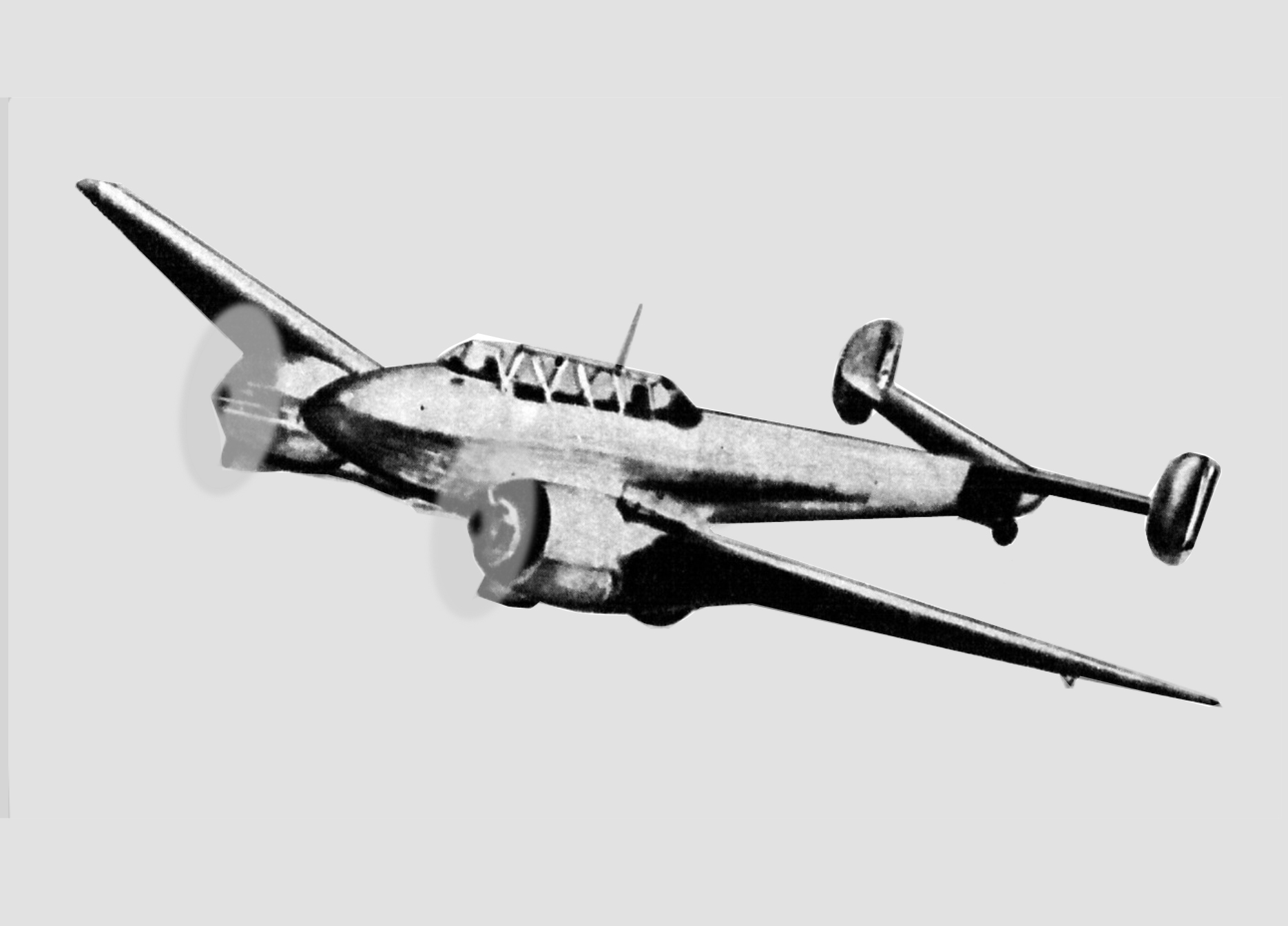
Potez 633, light bomber variant of the multi-role Potez 63 series. This series was the most produced French military aircraft series before World War II, with more than 1,300 built. Different variants of the Potez 63 series fulfilled different roles. For example, the Potez 630 and 631 were used as heavy fighters(which was the original purpose of the series) and the Potez 633 as a light bomber, whereas the Potez 637 and 63.11 were designed for reconnaissance.

=== Potez ===
- Potez 25 observation
- Potez 29 transport
- Potez 33 liaison
- Potez 39 observation
- Potez 230 light fighter prototype
- Potez 402 transport
- Potez 452 ship-borne flying boat
- Potez 542 bomber/reconnaissance
- Potez 56 trainer/transport
- Potez 585 liaison
- Potez 63 series, fighter, light bomber/reconnaissance (1200+ built)
  - Potez 630 fighter/trainer
  - Potez 631 day/night twin-engine fighter (215 built)
  - Potez 633 light bomber
  - Potez 637 reconnaissance
  - Potez 63.11 observation/reconnaissance (900+ built)
- Potez 650 transport
- Potez 662 transport
- Potez-CAMS 141 flying boat

=== Romano/SNCASE ===
- R.82 trainer

=== Roussel ===
- Roussel R-30 light fighter-bomber prototype

=== Salmson ===
- Salmson Cricri elementary trainer
- Salmson Phrygane liaison

=== SNCAO ===
- CAO.200 fighter
- CAO.30 flying boat trainer
- CAO.600 torpedo bomber

=== SNCASE ===
- SE.100 twin engine fighter
- SE.200 transport flying boat
- SE.400 patrol floatplane

=== Vought (American) ===
- V.156 carrier-borne dive bomber

=== Wibault-Penhoët ===
- Wibault 283T transport
- Wibault 360T transport

== Aircraft of the Free French Air Forces, 1940-1945 ==
- Airspeed Oxford Mk.II trainer
- Amiot 143M bomber
- Avro Anson bomber/trainer
- Avro York VIP transport
- Beechcraft Model 18 liaison/trainer
- Bell P-39N/Q fighter
- Bell P-63A Kingcobra fighter
- Bloch MB.81 liaison
- Bloch MB.131 bomber
- Bloch MB.174 reconnaissance
- Bloch MB.175 bomber
- Boeing B-17 Flying Fortress transport
- Bristol Blenheim Mk.IV & Mk.V light bomber
- CANT Z.1007 Alcione transport
- Caudron C.270 Luciole liaison
- Caudron C.400 Phalène liaison
- Caudron C.445 Goeland transport
- Caudron C.600 Aiglon liaison
- Caudron C.630 Simoun trainer
- Cessna UC-78 Bobcat liaison
- Consolidated PBY Catalina patrol bomber
- Cunliffe-Owen OA.1 transport
- Curtiss Hawk 75 fighter
- Curtiss P-40E/F/N fighter
- de Havilland DH.80 Puss Moth liaison
- de Havilland DH.82 Tiger Moth trainer
- Dewoitine D.520 fighter
- Douglas SBD Dauntless/A-24 bomber
- Douglas DB-7 medium bomber
- Douglas Boston medium bomber
- Farman F.220 transport
- Handley Page Halifax heavy bomber
- Hawker Hurricane Mk.I/Mk.IIB fighter
- Howard DGA-15 liaison
- Lioré et Olivier LeO 451 transport
- Lockheed Model 12 Electra Junior transport
- Lockheed Model 18 Lodestar transport
- Lockheed Hudson patrol bomber
- Lockheed F-4/F-5 Lightning photo reconnaissance
- Lockheed PV-1 Ventura patrol bomber
- Martin 167 bomber/liaison
- Martin 187 Baltimore bomber
- Martin B-26B/G Marauder medium bomber
- Morane-Saulnier M.S.230 trainer
- Morane-Saulnier M.S.315 trainer
- Morane-Saulnier M.S.406 fighter
- North American NAA-57 trainer
- North American B-25C/H Mitchell medium bomber
- North American F-6C Mustang photo reconnaissance
- Piper L-4 observation
- Polikarpov Po-2 liaison
- Potez 25 trainer
- Potez 29 transport
- Potez 540 liaison
- Potez 631 reconnaissance
- Potez 63.11 reconnaissance/bomber
- Potez 650 transport
- Republic P-47D Thunderbolt fighter-bomber
- Supermarine Spitfire fighter
- Supermarine Walrus rescue amphibian
- Universal L-7 liaison
- Stinson Reliant liaison/training
- Stinson 105 Voyager liaison
- Vultee BT-13 Valiant trainer
- Vultee A-35 Vengeance dive bomber
- Vickers Wellington maritime patrol
- Westland Lysander Mk.III liaison
- Yakovlev Yak-1 & 1M fighter
- Yakovlev Yak-3 fighter
- Yakovlev Yak-7B fighter
- Yakovlev Yak-9 & 9T fighter

== See also ==
- List of aircraft of World War II
- List of military aircraft of France
- List of Regia Aeronautica aircraft used in World War II
- List of aircraft of the Luftwaffe, World War II
- List of aircraft of the U.S. military, World War II
- List of aircraft of the Royal Air Force
