= R83 =

R83 may refer to:

- R83 (New York City Subway car)
- HMS Ulster (R83), a destroyer of the Royal Navy
- Romano R.83, a French fighter aircraft
