= Romano R.110 =

Twin engine 3 seat fighter aircraft

R.110

General information
- Type: Twin-engine fighter
- National origin: France
- Manufacturer: Chantiers aéronavals Étienne Romano
- Designer: Etienne Romano
- Primary user: French Air Force (intended)
- Number built: 1

History
- First flight: 30 March 1938

The Romano R.110 was a twin-engine 3-seat fighter aircraft, designed by Etienne Romano in the 1930s. A single prototype was built, but it was not successful, the Potez 630 being preferred.

== Design and description ==
On 31 October 1934 the French Air Ministry released a specification for a twin-engine multi-seat fighter aircraft, which would be required to fulfil several roles. A three seat version (C3 under the French designation scheme) would be used to command formations of smaller single-engine fighters, while two seat versions would be used to daylight bomber escort and attack (C2) or as night-fighters (CN2). Bids were received from a number of aircraft designers, including Breguet Aviation (the 690), Hanriot (the H.220), Potez (the 630) and Romano. The Romano design, the R.110, was a low-winged monoplane with a retractable tailwheel undercarriage. It was of mixed wood and metal construction, and was powered by two 450 hp (340 kW) Renault 12R-02 air-cooled V-12 engines. It carried the specified armament of two fixed 20 mm (0.79 in) cannon and a single flexibly mounted 7.5 mm (0.30 in) machine gun.

Construction of the prototype was relatively slow and it did not fly until 30 March 1938. By this time, the Potez 630 (which had first flown in 1936) had already been chosen to meet the requirement and was about to enter production, so development of the R.110 was abandoned.

== Specifications ==
Data from Aviafrance: Romano R.110

General characteristics

- Crew: 3
- Length: 9.66 m (31 ft 8 in)
- Wingspan: 12.8 m (42 ft 0 in)
- Height: 3.37 m (11 ft 1 in)
- Wing area: 24 m^{2} (260 sq ft)
- Empty weight: 2,165 kg (4,773 lb)
- Gross weight: 3,300 kg (7,275 lb)
- Powerplant: 2 × Renault 12R-02 V-12 inverted air-cooled piston engines, 340 kW (450 hp) each
- Propellers: 3-bladed variable-pitch propellers

Performance

- Maximum speed: 470 km/h (290 mph, 250 kn)
- Range: 1,280 km (800 mi, 690 nmi)
- Service ceiling: 10,500 m (34,400 ft)

Armament

- Guns: 2 × 20 mm (0.79 in) cannon + 1 × 7.5 mm (0.30 in) machine-gun
