= SNCAC NC-600 =

NC-600
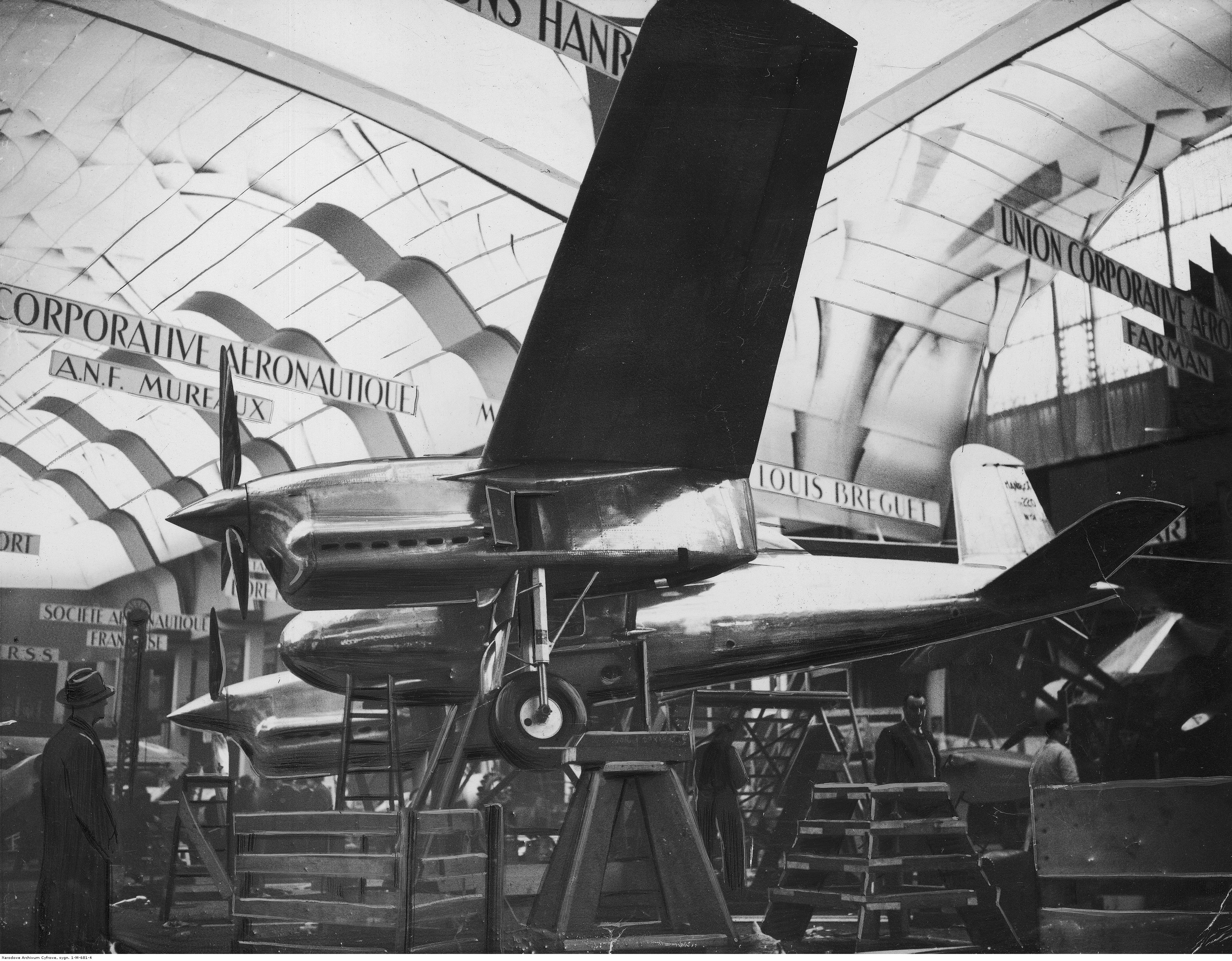
- Hanriot H.220

General information
- Type: Long-range fighter aircraft
- National origin: France
- Manufacturer: Société Nationale de Constructions Aéronautiques du Centre
- Number built: 2

History
- First flight: 2 September 1937 (Hanriot H.220)
- Developed from: Hanriot H.220

The SNCAC NC-600 was a prototype French twin-engined long-range fighter aircraft, developed by SNCAC from the earlier Hanriot H.220 fighter. The type never entered service, with development being ended by the French surrender in June 1940.

== Design and development ==
In October 1934, the French Service Technique de l'Aeronautique (or Air Ministry) issued a requirement for a three-seat fighter, with Hanriot designing the H.220 to meet this requirement, competing with designs from Potez (the 630), Breguet Aviation (the 690) and Romano (the R-110). The H.220 was a twin-engined monoplane of all metal construction. The fuselage was a short, oval-section monocoque which accommodated the crew of three in tandem enclosed cockpits. The shoulder-mounted wings were braced by a single short strut on each side, and was fitted with full span trailing edge flaps and split ailerons. Armament was intended to be two fixed forward firing 20 mm cannon and two machine guns in the rear cockpit. The unflown prototype, fitted with two 340-kilowatt (450 hp) Renault 12Roi air cooled V12 engines, was exhibited at the 1936 Paris Air Show.

The prototype was re-engined with 510 kilowatts (680 hp) Gnome-Rhône 14M radial engines before it made its maiden flight at Avord on 21 September 1937. Tests showed that the aircraft was unstable, with numerous changes being made to the tail surfaces to try and rectify the problems before the prototype was badly damaged in a forced landing caused by an engine failure on 17 February 1938. This crash-landing wrecked the fuselage of the H.220, and SNCAC, (Société Nationale de Constructions Aéronautiques du Centre), which had been formed by the merger of Hanriot and Farman as part of the nationalisation of the French aviation industry in 1937, took the opportunity to rebuild the prototype to a new design. (Note: The competing Potez 630, which had first flown in April 1936, had already been ordered into production, with construction of 80 aircraft starting in May 1937.)

The rebuilt and resigned prototype, redesignated the H.220-2, had a new fuselage, built out of two half shells joined by a central keel, with a twin-tail replacing the conventional single-fin tail surfaces of the earlier design. The aircraft's wings, however, were unchanged. The aircraft first flew in this form on 17 March 1939.

Meanwhile, an order for six aircraft had been placed in 1938 for evaluation purposes under the designation NC-600. The design was now intended to meet a 1936 specification for a long-range fighter, competing with the Potez 670 and the SNCASE SE.100. The H.220-2 was exhibited at the 1939 Brussels Air Show to represent the NC-600, but the real NC-600 was a further redesigned aircraft, with new wings and revised tail surfaces, and was now being offered as a two-seat aircraft. The proposed armament was also revised, with two additional fixed forward firing machine guns and the two rear-firing guns replaced by a single flexibly mounted cannon.

The NC-600 prototype flew on 15 May 1940, but again other types were preferred, with orders being placed for 40 Potez 671s and at least 300 SE.100s. Work on the six-aircraft evaluation batch was stopped by the German occupation of SNCAC's Bourges factory.

== Specifications (NC-600) ==
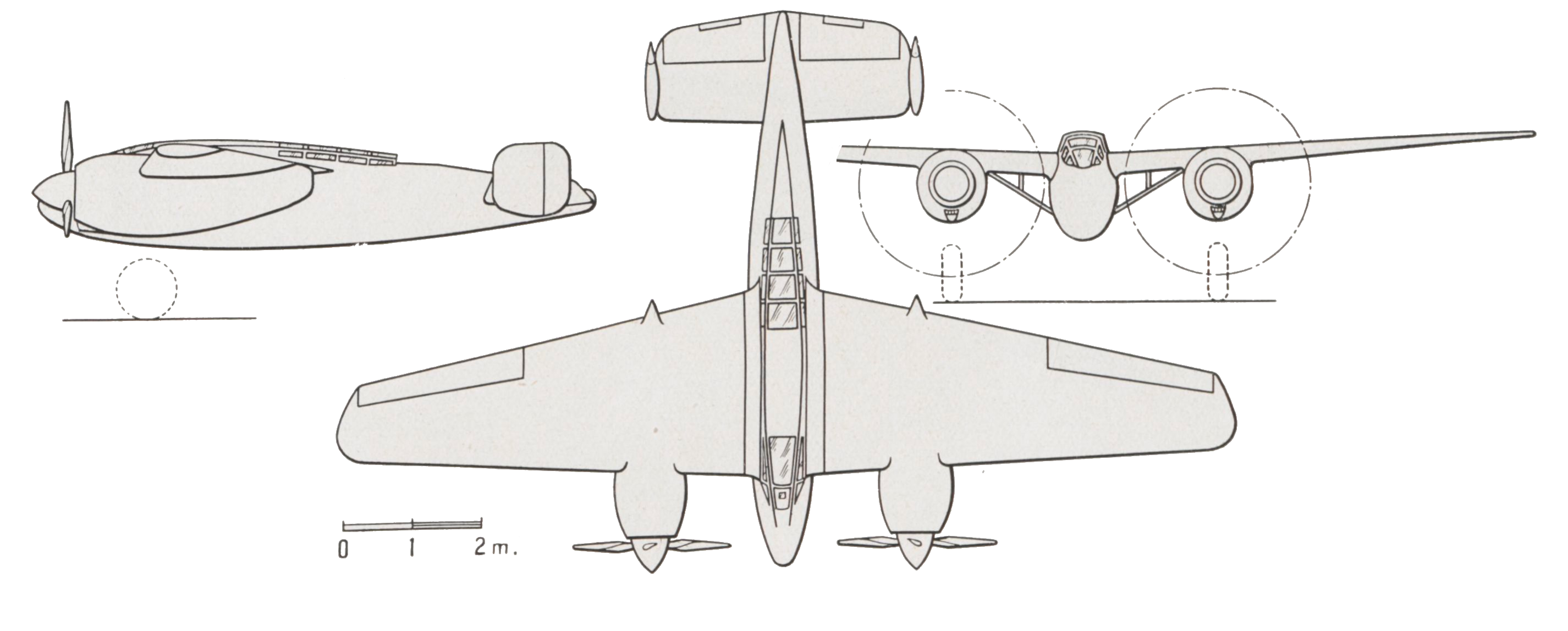
3-views of the Hanriot H220 (roughly similar to the NC-600).

Data from The Complete Book of Fighters

General characteristics

- Crew: 2
- Length: 8.80 m (28 ft 10 in)
- Wingspan: 12.80 m (42 ft 0 in)
- Height: 3.40 m (11 ft 2 in)
- Wing area: 21.16 m^{2} (227.8 sq ft)
- Empty weight: 2,948 kg (6,499 lb)
- Gross weight: 4,000 kg (8,818 lb)
- Powerplant: 2 × Gnome-Rhône 14M0/01 14-cylinder, two-row radial engines, 530 kW (710 hp) each

Performance

- Maximum speed: 542 km/h (337 mph, 293 kn) at 5,000 m (16,400 ft)
- Range: 860 km (530 mi, 460 nmi)
- Time to altitude: 14 minutes to 8,000 m (26,200 ft)

Armament

- Guns:
  - 2 × fixed forward-firing 20 mm Hispano-Suiza HS.404 cannon and 2 × 7.5 mm MAC 1934 machine guns
  - 1 × flexibly mounted 20 mm cannon firing aft

== See also ==
Aircraft of comparable role, configuration, and era

- Breguet 693
- Potez 630
