= Chantiers aéronavals Étienne Romano =

French aircraft manufacturing company

- Industry: Aeronautics, defence
- Predecessor: Chantiers aéronavals de la Méditerranée
- Founded: 16 August 1929
- Founder: Étienne Romano & André Auniac
- Defunct: 11 August 1936
- Fate: Merged
- Successor: SNCASE
- Headquarters: Cannes, France
- Products: Aircraft

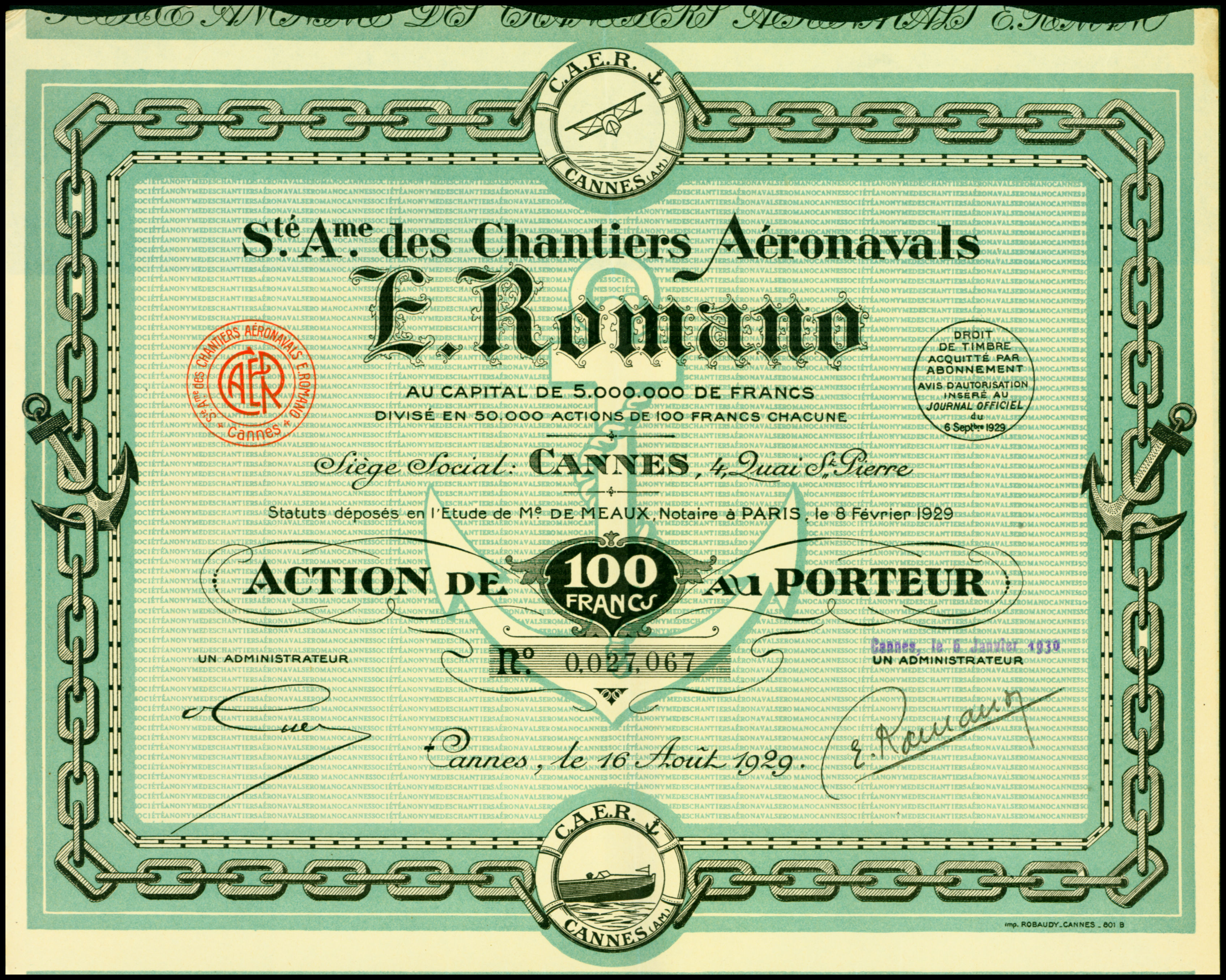
Share of the Chantiers aéronavals Étienne Romano, issued 16 August 1929

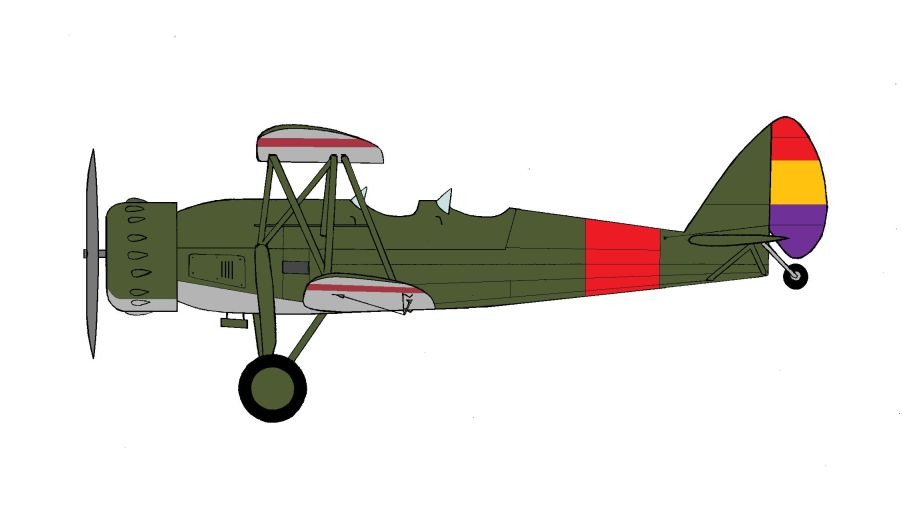
Romano R.80 of the Spanish Republican Air Force training facility at El Carmolí

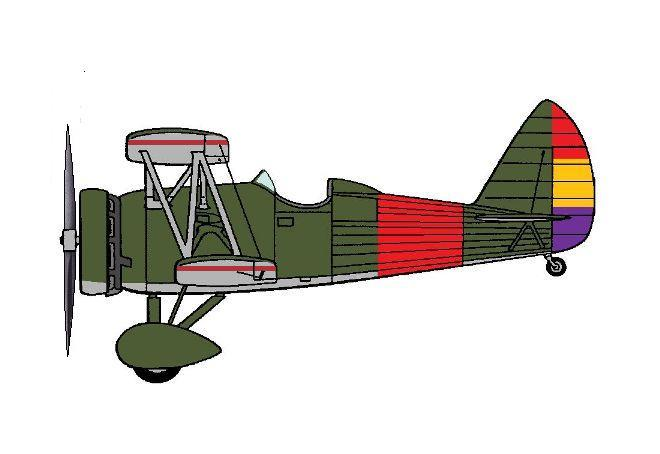
Romano R.83

The S.A. des Chantiers aéronavals Étienne Romano (CAER) was an aircraft manufacturing company based in Cannes, France. The predecessor company, Chantiers aéronavals de la Méditerranée had been founded by Étienne Romano in 1921.

== History ==
André Auniac and Étienne Romano founded the SA des Chantiers aéronavals Étienne Romano on 16 August 1929. The factory was ideally located between the Mediterranean Sea and a flat expanse of grassland where the planes could take-off and land. That field would become later Cannes – Mandelieu Airport. In 1931 the Romano factory became operational and full production started.

On 11 August 1936 the Romano company was nationalized following which in 1937 it was merged with Lioré et Olivier, Potez, CAMS and SPCA in order to form the Société nationale des constructions aéronautiques du Sud-Est (SNCASE) on 1 February 1937.

== Aircraft ==
- R.3
- R.4
- R.5
- R.6
- R.15
- R.16
- R.80
- R.82
- R.83
- R.90
- R.92
- R.110
- R.120
