= Cannes–Mandelieu Airport =

Airport serving Cannes, France

Cannes–Mandelieu Airport Aéroport de Cannes–Mandelieu Advanced Landing Ground (ALG) Y-11
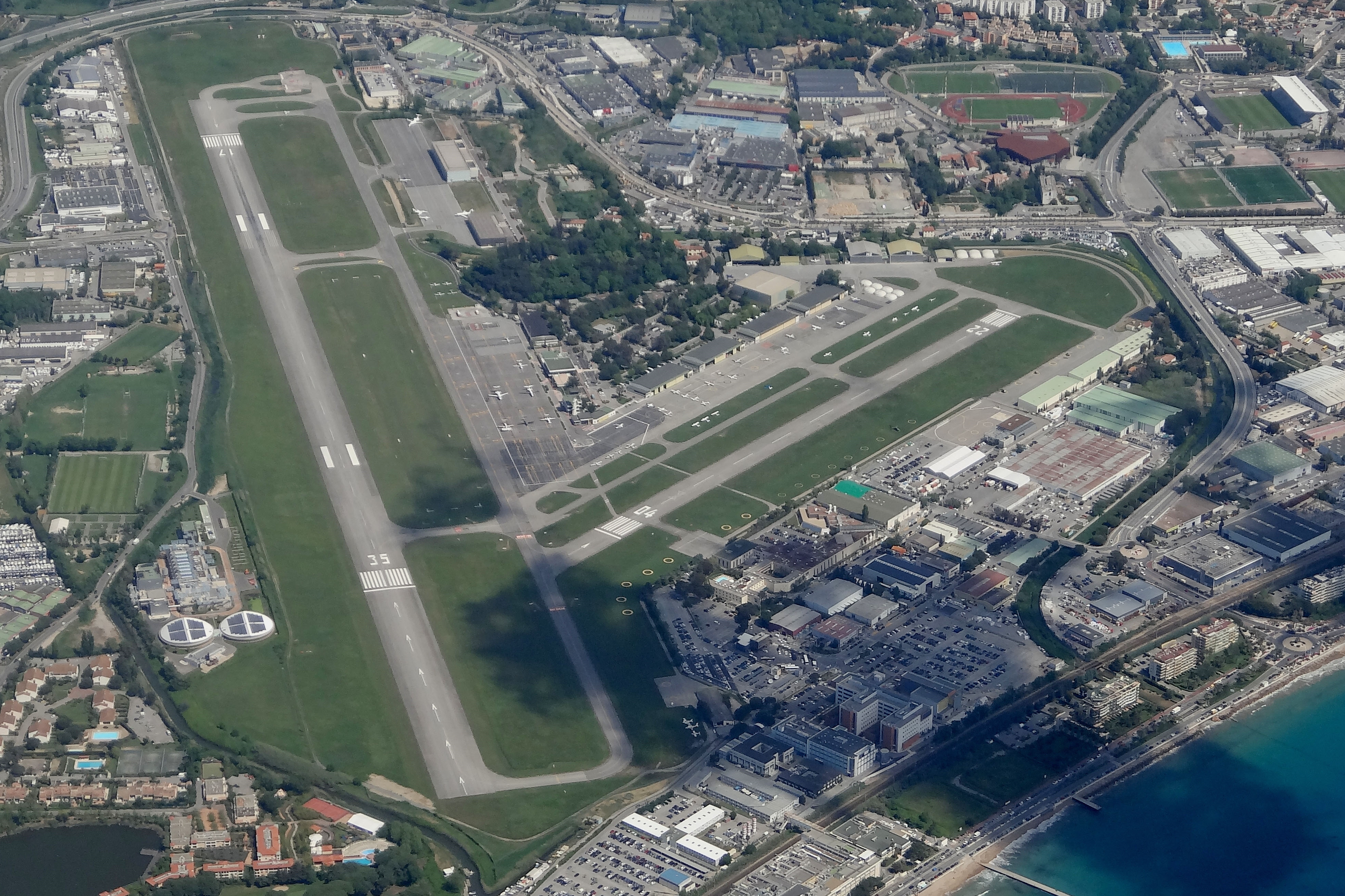
- Aerial view of the airport in 2015
- IATA: CEQ; ICAO: LFMD

Summary
- Airport type: Public
- Operator: Aéroports de la Côte d'Azur (ACA)
- Serves: Cannes, France
- Elevation AMSL: 13 ft / 4 m
- Coordinates: 43°32′47″N 006°57′15″E
- Website: www.cannes.aeroport.fr

Map
- Location of airfield in Provence-Alpes-Côte d'Azur

Runways
Direction	Length		Surface
Direction	m	ft	Surface
17/35	1,610	5,282	Asphalt
04/22	760	2,493	Asphalt
- Sources: French AIP and airport website

Cannes–Mandelieu Airport or Aéroport de Cannes–Mandelieu (IATA: CEQ, ICAO: LFMD) is an airport serving the city of Cannes. It is located 5 km west of Cannes and east of Mandelieu-la-Napoule, both communes of the Alpes-Maritimes département in the Provence-Alpes-Côte-d'Azur région of France.

Dominique Thillaud is the President of Aéroports de la Côte d'Azur (ACA), which includes Nice Côte d'Azur Airport and Cannes–Mandelieu Airport.

Aéroports de la Côte d'Azur (ACA) announced on 26 July 2013 that it had acquired 99.9% of shares of AGST (Saint-Tropez Airport), previously owned by the Reybier group for the past 15 years.

== See also ==
- Chantiers aéronavals Étienne Romano
