= Romano R.3 =

1920s French aircraft

General information
- Type: Experimental seaplane
- National origin: France
- Manufacturer: Chantiers aéronavals Étienne Romano
- Number built: 1

History
- First flight: 1924

The Romano R.3 was a French experimental seaplane built by Romano in the 1920s. It featured a biplane layout.

== Specifications ==
Data from

General characteristics

- Crew: Two
- Length: 7.80 m (25 ft 7 in)
- Wingspan: 11.00 m (36 ft 1 in)
- Height: 3.70 m (12 ft 2 in)
- Wing area: 30.00 m^{2} (322.9 sq ft)
- Gross weight: 1,020 kg (2,249 lb)
- Powerplant: 1 × Hispano-Suiza 8Ab V-8 water-cooled piston engine, 130 kW (180 hp)

Performance

- Maximum speed: 160 km/h (99 mph, 86 kn)
- Service ceiling: 2,000 m (6,600 ft) in 14 minutes
