= Romano R.4 =

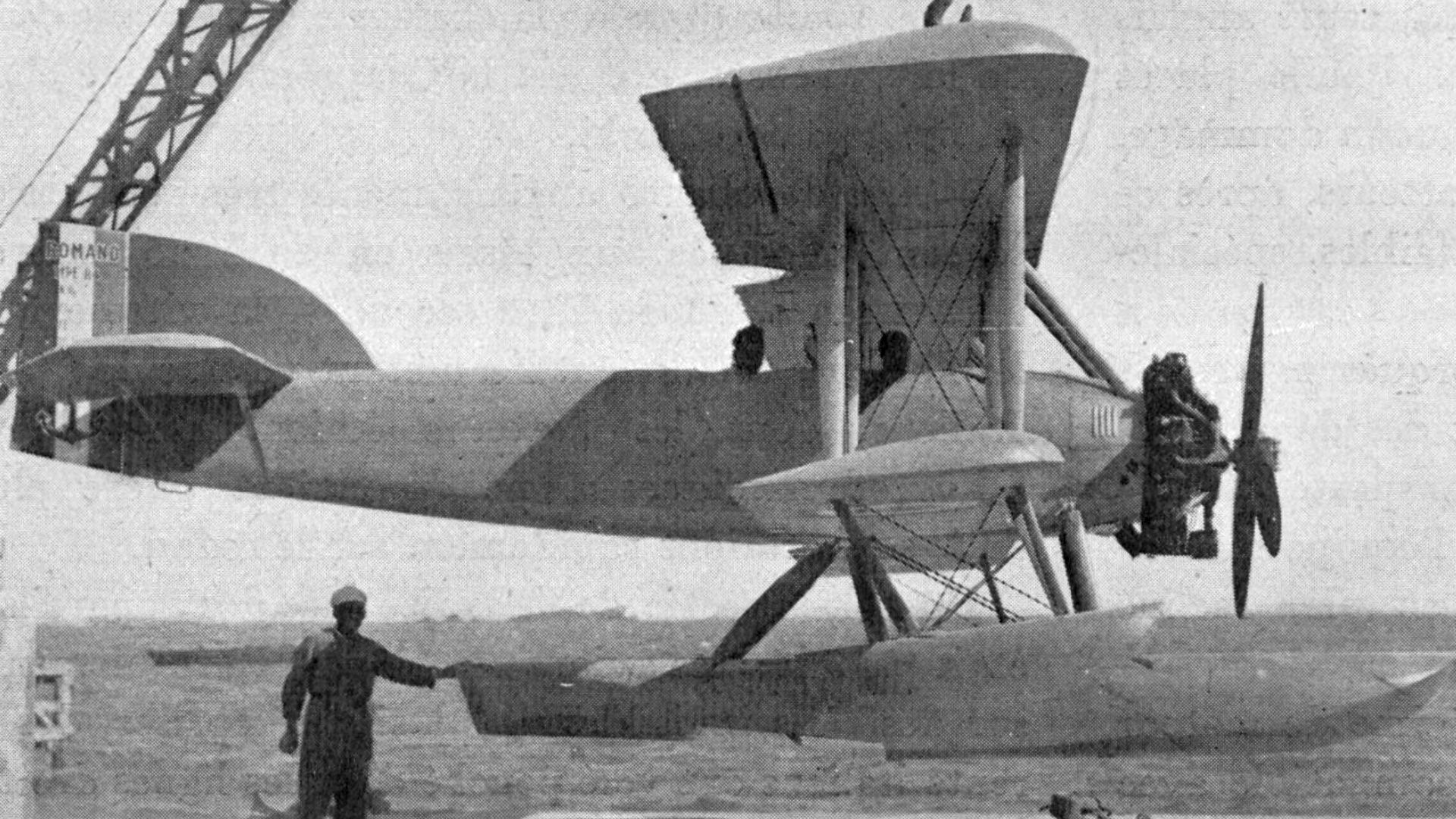

General information
- Type: Reconnaissance flying boat
- National origin: France
- Manufacturer: Chantiers aéronavals Étienne Romano
- Number built: 1

History
- First flight: 1927

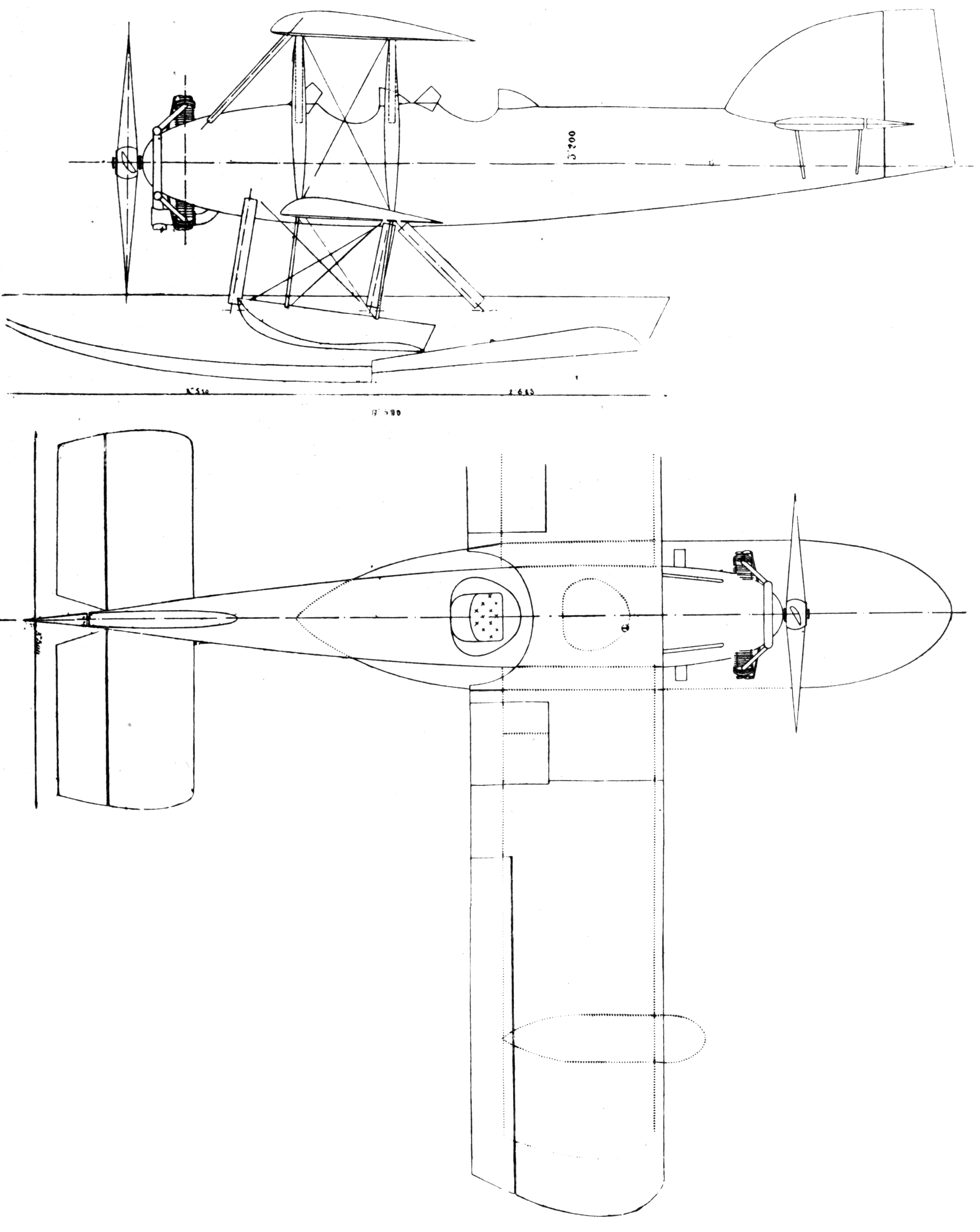
3-view drawing

The Romano R.4 was a French biplane reconnaissance floatplane built in 1927.

== Specifications ==
Data from

General characteristics

- Crew: Two
- Length: 8.58 m (28 ft 2 in)
- Wingspan: 11.40 m (37 ft 5 in)
- Height: 3.20 m (10 ft 6 in)
- Wing area: 32.00 m^{2} (344.4 sq ft)
- Gross weight: 1,445 kg (3,186 lb)
- Powerplant: 1 × Salmson 9Ab 9-cylinder air-cooled radial piston engine, 170 kW (230 hp)

Performance

- Maximum speed: 184 km/h (114 mph, 99 kn)
- Range: 600 km (370 mi, 320 nmi)
- Service ceiling: 7,200 m (23,600 ft)
- Time to altitude: 3,000 m (9,800 ft) in 22 minutes
