= Romano R.5 =

General information
- Type: Reconnaissance flying boat
- National origin: France
- Manufacturer: Chantiers aéronavals Étienne Romano
- Number built: 1

History
- First flight: September 1932

The Romano R.5 was a French reconnaissance flying boat built in 1932. It had a parasol wing, a single engine and hull stabilizing sponsons. Only one was built.

== Design ==
In 1929 the French Air Ministry drew up a programme of military aircraft specifications to meet France's needs over the next few years. One part called for a reconnaissance and observation seaplane and the R.5 was Romano's response; at least two other manufacturers also built prototypes, though funding was not yet assured.

The Romano R.5 was an all-metal flying boat. Its parasol wing was built in three parts; its centre section mounted a 480 kW (650 hp) Hispano-Suiza 12Nbr water-cooled V-12 engine in tractor configuration on its leading edge and was braced 1,650 mm (65 in) over the fuselage by parallel pairs of struts from its outer ends to the mid-fuselage. Six short cabane struts braced it centrally. The inner and cantilever outer panels together provided a trapezoidal plan wing out to rounded tips; ailerons occupied most of the outer panels' trailing edges. Structurally a mixture of steel and duralumin, with dural skinning, the wing was built around two spars; in the centre section these were elaborated into a trellised girder.

Its 15-metre-long (49 ft 3 in), flat-sided hull was built with of dural and with vedal, layers of dural and pure aluminium, for parts in direct contact with sea-water. The V-form underside had a single step under the wing and, further aft, a water rudder. The R.5 had a pair of Dornier-style sponsons, 6.3 m (20 ft 8 in) in span and 2.5 m (8 ft 2 in) at their broadest, mounted on the lower sides of the fuselage instead of wing mounted floats. There were plans to use these to contain retractable wheels to turn the R.5 into an amphibian.

In the nose there was a position for mooring operations, navigation equipment and a machine gun mounting. The pilots' cabin was ahead of the propeller disc, fully enclosed and with side-by-side seats and dual controls. Behind the wing there were positions for a navigator who also operated the bomb release controls and for a radio and camera operator. Behind them was a dorsal gunner's position, midway between the trailing edge and the tail. The fuselage became slender to the rear, where the tall fin carried a deep, rounded unbalanced rudder. The R.5's tapered tailplane was raised out of the spray well up on the fin and supported from below with a pair of parallel struts from the upper fuselage. Its elevators were inset and unbalanced but far enough forward to only require a small central nick for rudder movement.

The Romano R.5 first flew in September 1932. Soon after, it was delivered to the Forces Aérienne de la Mer along with its competitors, the Amiot 110-S and CAMS 80.

== Specifications ==
Data from Les Ailes, November 1932

General characteristics

- Crew: Three
- Length: 16 m (52 ft 6 in)
- Wingspan: 22.60 m (74 ft 2 in)
- Height: 4.50 m (14 ft 9 in)
- Wing area: 67.5 m^{2} (727 sq ft)
- Aspect ratio: 7.6
- Gross weight: 4,300 kg (9,480 lb)
- Powerplant: 1 × Hispano-Suiza 12Nbr water-cooled V-12, 480 kW (650 hp)

Performance

- Maximum speed: 217 km/h (135 mph, 117 kn) at 1,500 m (4,900 ft)
- Range: 1,500 km (930 mi, 810 nmi)
- Service ceiling: 6,700 m (22,000 ft)
- Time to altitude: 6 min 5 sec to 1,500 m (4,900 ft)
