= Romano R.82 =

R-82
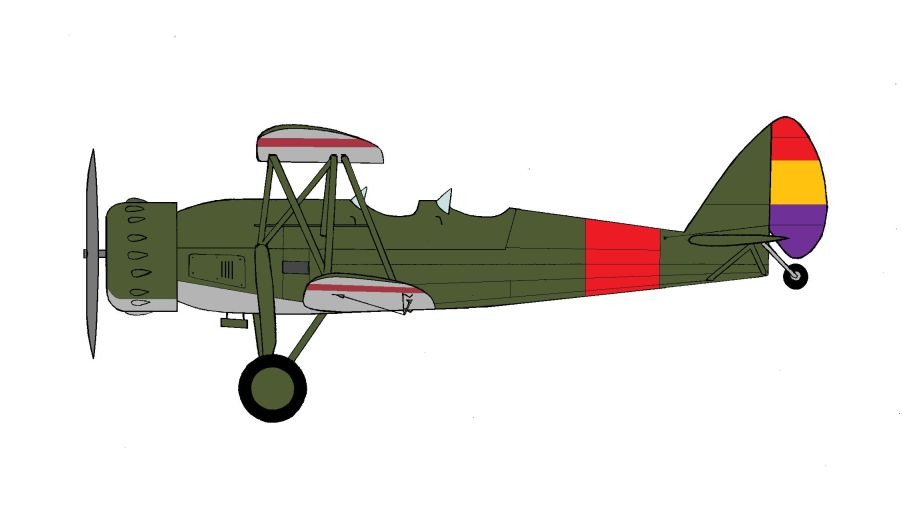
- Romano R.80.2 of the Spanish Republican Air Force training facility at El Carmolí.

General information
- Type: Two-seat intermediate and aerobatic trainer
- National origin: France
- Manufacturer: Chantiers aéronavals Étienne Romano
- Designer: Etienne Romano
- Primary users: French Air Force French Navy
- Number built: 180

History
- First flight: 1936

The Romano R-82 was a two-seat intermediate and aerobatic trainer designed by Etienne Romano, with production aircraft built by Chantiers aéronavals Étienne Romano.

== Design and development ==
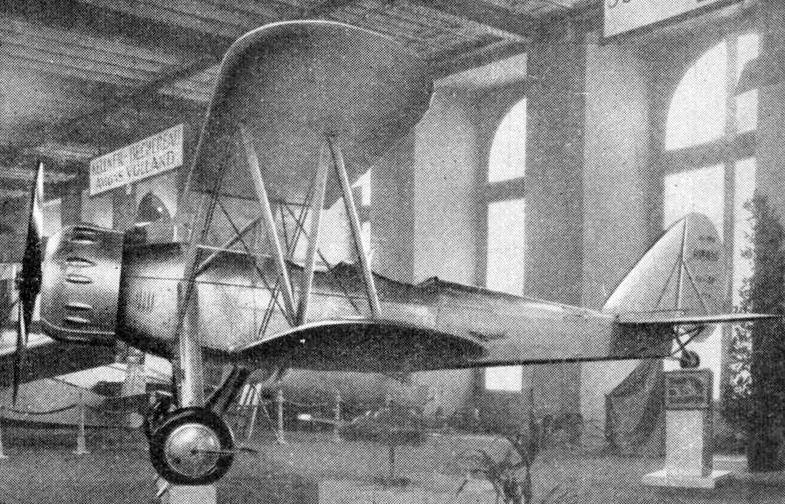
Romano 80 photo from L'Aerophile December 1936

The prototype Romano R-80.01 was a private venture design by Chantiers aéronavals Étienne Romano for a two-seat aerobatic biplane to use as a demonstrator. Tested in 1935 with a 179 kW (240 hp) Lorraine 7Me radial engine, it was later fitted with a 209 kW (280 hp) Salmson 9Aba radial and re-designated as the R-80.2. The R.80.2 was a biplane with a fixed tailwheel landing gear and with the change of scope to a tandem two-seat dual-control aerobatic trainer, it was re-designated the R.82.01. Two more prototypes were built, which were sold to private owners. Romano became part of the nationalised SNCASE in 1937 and the French Air Force ordered the R-82 into production, with 147 aircraft being delivered. The French Navy also ordered 30 R-82s, and all Air Force and Navy aircraft had been delivered by May 1940.

In 1938 two aircraft were ferried to Spain and used by the Spanish Republican government in the fight against the Nationalist faction.

== Operators ==
France

- French Air Force
- French Navy

Spain

- Spanish Republican Air Force

== Specifications (R-82) ==
Data from

General characteristics

- Crew: 2
- Length: 7.82 m (25 ft 7 in)
- Wingspan: 9.88 m (32 ft 5 in)
- Height: 3.34 m (10 ft 11.5 in)
- Wing area: 23.72 m^{2} (255.33 sq ft)
- Empty weight: 918 kg (2,024 lb)
- Gross weight: 1,328 kg (2,928 lb)
- Powerplant: 1 × Salmson 9Aba radial piston engine , 209 kW (280 hp)

Performance

- Maximum speed: 240 km/h (149 mph, 129 kn)
- Range: 660 km (410 mi, 360 nmi)
- Service ceiling: 6,500 m (21,325 ft)

== See also ==
Related development

- Romano R.83

Related lists

- List of aircraft of the Spanish Republican Air Force
- List of Interwar military aircraft
