= Romano R.90 =

Prototype single-seat French floatplane fighter

R.90
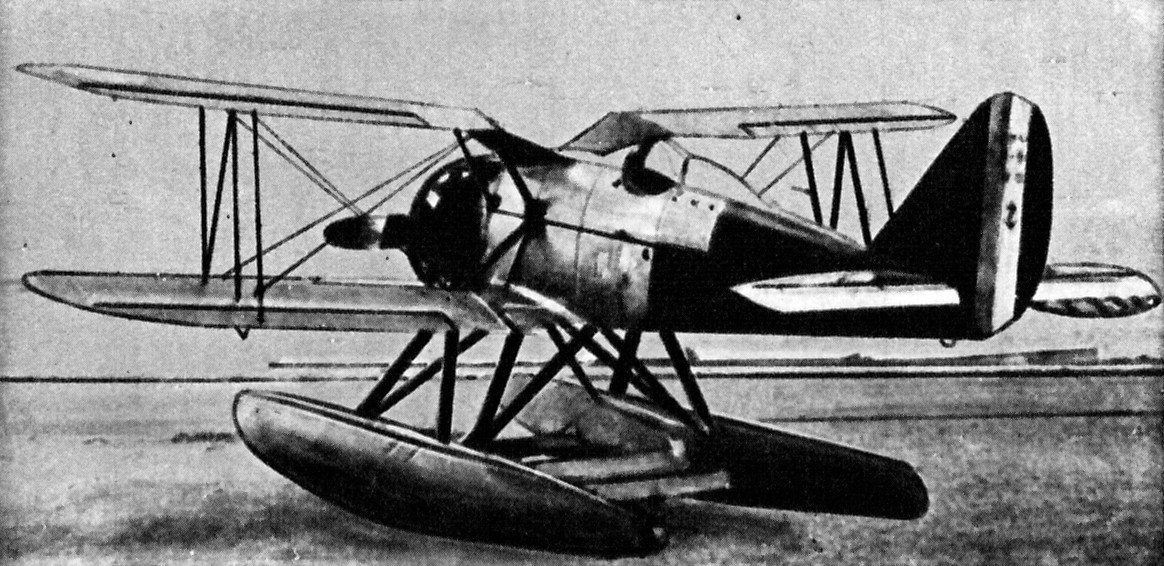
- Romano R.90 prototype

General information
- Type: Fighter floatplane
- National origin: France
- Manufacturer: Chantiers aéronavals Étienne Romano

History
- First flight: August 1935

The Romano R.90 was a prototype single-seat French floatplane fighter of the 1930s. A single example of the R.90 was built, but the type did form the basis of the Romano R.83 and Romano R.92 fighters which were built in secret for the Spanish Republicans during the Spanish Civil War.

== Design and development ==
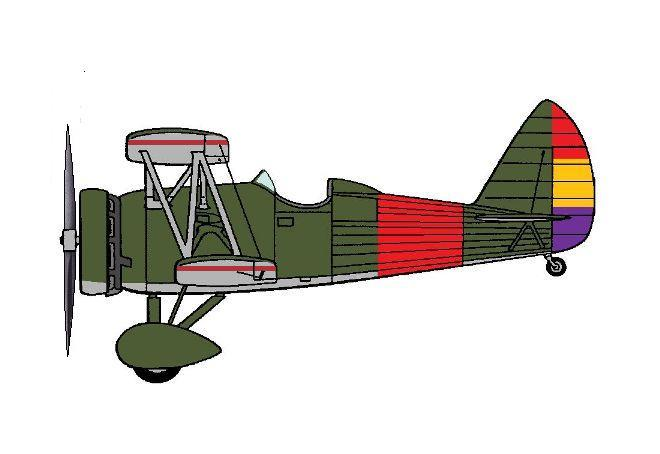
Romano R.83 of the Spanish Republican Air Force

In 1933, the French Navy issued a specification for a single-seat seaplane fighter capable of being operated from the catapults of its cruisers and battleships. To meet this requirement, the Chantiers aéronavals Étienne Romano designed a floatplane, the Romano R.90, with designs also being prepared by Loire, Bernard and Potez.

Unlike the other three designs, the R.90 was a biplane. It was of mixed construction, with a welded steel-tube fuselage and wooden, single-bay wings, with the upper wings being gulled into the top of the fuselage to give a better view for the pilot. Two floats were fitted. The proposed armament was four 7.5mm machine guns, two in the lower wing and two in the floats.

It made its maiden flight in August 1935, powered by a 720 hp (537 kW) Hispano-Suiza 9Vbrs radial engine. With this engine it reached a speed of 352 km/h (219 mph). In October that year it was re-engined with a 680 hp (507 kW) Hispano-Suiza 14Hbrs radial in a NACA cowling, increasing the speed and the floats were modified. It was re-engined again in October 1937 with a 900 hp (671 kW) Hispano-Suiza 12Ycrs-1 V12 engine with a 20mm cannon firing through the propeller boss. Despite reaching 400 km/h (248 mph), faster than any of the other competitors, the R.90 was not ordered into production, 20 Loire 210s being purchased instead.

Although the attempts to sell the R.90 to the French Navy failed, the aircraft attracted the attention of the Spanish Republican Air Force, which placed an order for 24 of a landplane derivative, the Romano R.83. This differed in having a conventional fixed tailwheel undercarriage, a non-gulled upper wing and was to be powered by a 450 hp (336 kW) Pratt & Whitney Wasp Junior engine. These aircraft were to be assembled in secret by the Belgium company LACEBA (Les Ateliers de Construction et d'Exploitation de Brevets Aéronautiques). Flight testing in Belgium was carried out with a 280 hp (209 kW) Salmson 9ABa engine, to give the impression that the aircraft was a trainer rather than a fighter, with the more powerful engine to be fitted when the aircraft was delivered to Spain.

A second landplane fighter derivative was designed and built for the Spanish Republicans, the Romano R.92. This was powered by a Hispano-Suiza 12Ycrs engine as tested in the Romano R.90, and reverted to the gulled upper wing of the floatplane. A single example was built in 1938.

== Operational history ==
The first six R.83s were delivered to Barcelona between April and July 1938. The six R.83s were re-engined with the intended Wasp-Junior engines and were probably used as advanced trainers. The remaining 18 R.83s had not been completed by the time the Spanish Civil War ended in April 1939. The sole R.92 was also delivered to Spain in 1938, but any use is unknown.

== Variants ==
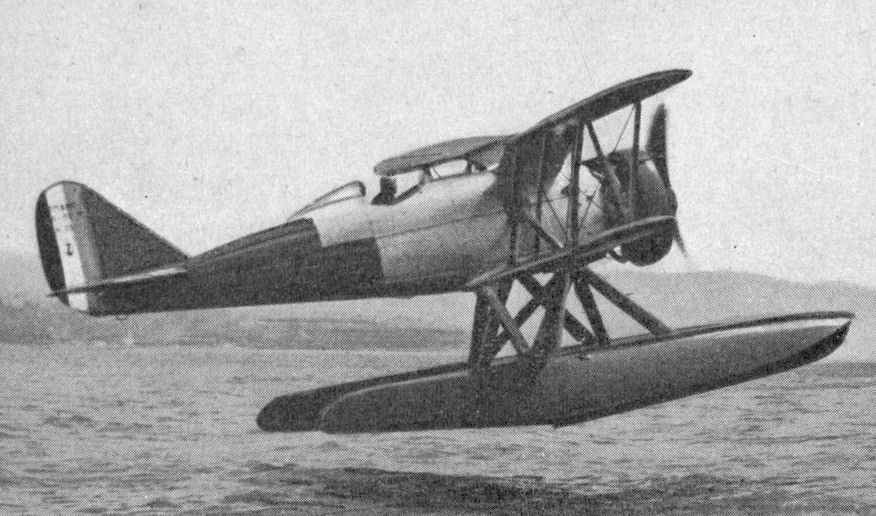
Romano R.90 photo from L'Aerophile June 1936

Romano R.90
Single seat floatplane fighter. One built.
Romano R.83
Single seat landplane, powered by Salmson 9 for testing and delivery to be replaced by Pratt & Whitney Wasp Junior on delivery for operational use. 24 ordered by Spain, 6 delivered.
Romano R.92
Single seat landplane fighter, powered by 900 hp (671 kW) Hispano-Suiza 12Ycrs-1 V12 engine and armed with single 20mm cannon. One built.

== Operators ==
Spain

- Spanish Republican Air Force

== Specifications (R.90, HS-14 engine) ==
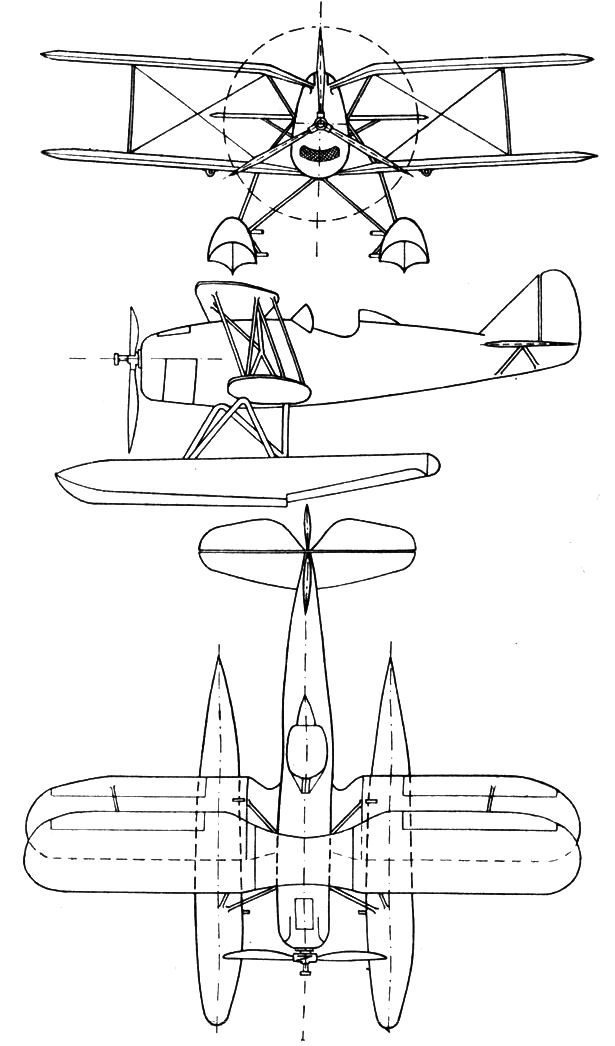
Romano R.90 3-view drawing from L'Aerophile June 1936

Data from The Complete Book of Fighters

General characteristics

- Crew: 1
- Length: 8.67 m (28 ft 5 in)
- Wingspan: 8.88 m (29 ft 2 in)
- Height: 3.93 m (12 ft 11 in)
- Wing area: 21.00 m^{2} (226.0 sq ft)
- Empty weight: 1,642 kg (3,620 lb)
- Gross weight: 1,990 kg (4,387 lb)
- Powerplant: 1 × Hispano-Suiza 14Hbrs 14-cylinder air-cooled radial engines, 510 kW (680 hp)

Performance

- Maximum speed: 368 km/h (229 mph, 199 kn) at 3,500 m (11,485 ft)
- Range: 650 km (400 mi, 350 nmi)

== See also ==
Related development

- Romano R.82

Related lists

- List of aircraft of the Spanish Republican Air Force
- List of Interwar military aircraft
