= Romano R.15 =

1930s French aircraft

The Romano R.15 was an amphibious aircraft built in France by Romano in the early 1930s.

== Design and development ==
The R.15 was a high-wing floatplane of all-metal construction. The pilot and passenger were seated in an enclosed cabin. It first flew in 1933 and showed good flight characteristics, but failed to win orders from the civil aviation industry.

== Specifications ==
Data from

General characteristics

- Crew: 2
- Length: 9.06 m (29 ft 9 in)
- Wingspan: 14.45 m (47 ft 5 in)
- Height: 3.47 m (11 ft 5 in)
- Wing area: 26.30 m^{2} (283.1 sq ft)
- Empty weight: 928 kg (2,046 lb)
- Gross weight: 1,268 kg (2,795 lb)
- Powerplant: 1 × Salmson 9Aer 9-cylinder air-cooled radial engine, 56 kW (75 hp)

Performance

- Maximum speed: 186 km/h (116 mph, 100 kn)
- Cruise speed: 160 km/h (99 mph, 86 kn)
- Range: 500 km (310 mi, 270 nmi)
- Service ceiling: 6,500 m (21,300 ft)
