= Potez 630 =

French twin-engined heavy fighter of World War II

- Potez 630

General information
- Type: Heavy fighter; Night fighter; Attack aircraft; Light bomber; Aerial reconnaissance
- Manufacturer: SNCAN
- Designer: Louis Coroller and André Delaruelle
- Status: Retired
- Primary users: French Air Force French Naval Aviation; Vichy French Air Force; Free French Air Forces; Luftwaffe (captured aircraft); Royal Hellenic Air Force
- Number built: 1,395

History
- Introduction date: October 1938
- First flight: 25 April 1936

The Potez 630 and its derivatives were a family of twin-engined, multi-role aircraft developed for the French Air Force in the late 1930s. The design was a contemporary of the British Bristol Blenheim (which was larger and designed purely as a bomber) and the German Messerschmitt Bf 110 (which was designed purely as a fighter).

The Potez 630 was in use by several operators during the Second World War. Following the Battle of France, the Vichy French Air Force and Free French Air Forces used the type; a number of captured aircraft were operated by several air wings of the Axis powers. After the end of the conflict in 1945, a handful of aircraft were used for training purposes for some time.

== Development ==
=== Origins ===
On 31 October 1934, the French Ministry of Air issued a specification for a heavy fighter. The specification demanded the aircraft be capable of performing three main roles, fighter direction, in which it was required to lead formations of single-engine fighters with sufficient maneuverability; day attack, in which the type was also to escort friendly close air support and bomber aircraft; and night-fighter operations. Specified performance details included a maximum speed of 450 km/h (280 mph) at 4,000 m (13,000 ft), a 300 km/h (190 mph) cruising speed, and an endurance of at least four hours. Armament requirements included two fixed forward-firing 20 mm (0.79 in) cannons and a machine gun to the rear for self-defence. The aircraft was also required to accommodate two/three seats along with twin engines; some of the performance limitations imposed upon the aircraft, such as the maximum weight, served to restrict the range of suitable engines to power the type.

The original Potez 630 was developed to meet this specification; two variants of the aircraft were originally submitted for consideration, one (the 630) powered by Hispano-Suiza 14AB radial engines and the other (the 631) with the Gnome-Rhône 14N. Other companies produced submissions, including Breguet Aviation, Hanriot, Chantiers aéronavals Étienne Romano, and Loire-Nieuport. Each of the manufacturers was requested to produce a prototype for evaluation at their expense; work on the first prototype, the Potez 630-01, commenced in April 1935. The specification also resulted in the successful Breguet 690 series of attack aircraft.

On 25 April 1936, the Potez 630–01, equipped with a pair of 580 hp (430 kW) Hispano-Suiza 14 engines, conducted its maiden flight from Méaulte, Picardy. The prototype was equipped with an experimental feature in the form of a braced horizontal stabilizer that incorporated no dihedral. On 6 May 1936, the prototype suffered some damage due to a forced landing following the mid-air loss of a propeller blade. On 3 August 1936, after receiving repairs, the Potez 630-01 was transferred to Villacoublay Air Base, Île-de-France; it was soon refitted with an alternative tail arrangement similar to later production aircraft and long-stroke landing gear. On 20 November 1936, flight testing of the prototype resumed; it was shortly thereafter delivered to the Centre d'Essais de Matériels Aériens (CEMA) for official tests.

The original engines of the Potez 630-01 were progressively replaced with improved models of Hispano-Suiza engine, gradually increasing power to reach 700 hp (520 kW) on takeoff. At its maximum takeoff weight of 3,850 kg (8,490 lb), the prototype was capable of a maximum speed of 460 km/h (290 mph) and a maximum range of 1,300 km (810 mi) when flown at an economical cruising speed of 300 km/h (190 mph). In March 1937, the second prototype, the Potez 630–02, performed its maiden flight from Méaulte. The Potez 631-01 was damaged after a landing with its landing gear not being locked into the down position; after repairs, it was handed over to CEMA for official trials in November 1937.

=== Production ===
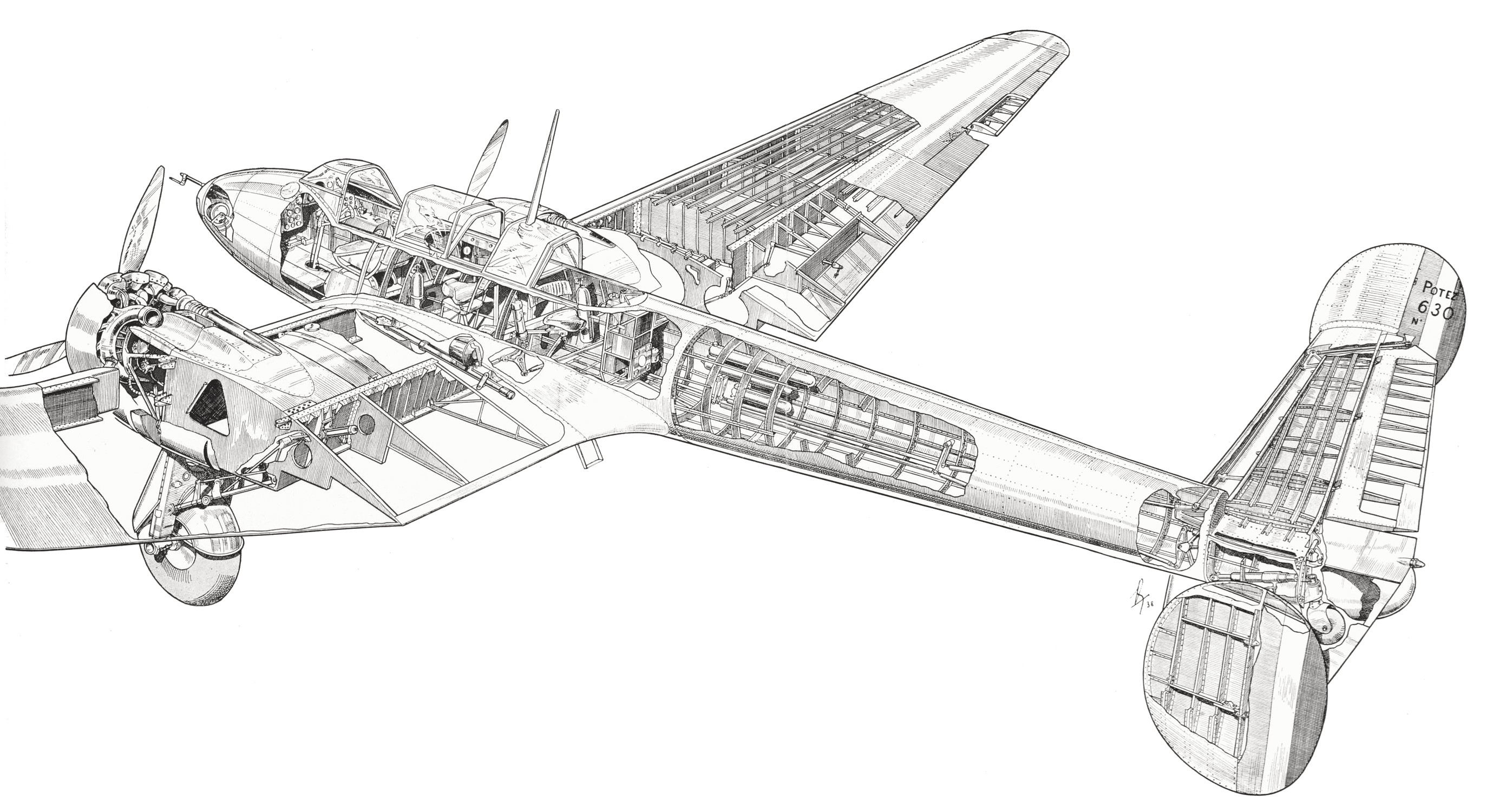
Cutaway of the Potez 630.

On 23 December 1936, the Société nationale des constructions aéronautiques du Nord (SNCAN) was officially formed, grouping five French aircraft factories; further amalgamations into SNCAN soon took place, including Potez in early 1937. Shortly following its establishment, SNCAN received a provisional order letter for ten experimental aircraft; four of these were derived from the Potez 630, three from the Potez 631 (one being the 631-01 prototype), two Potez 633 light bombers and one Potez 637 aerial reconnaissance aircraft. This was promptly confirmed by a contract, under which one Potez 633 was replaced by a Potez 637 low-level ground-attack aircraft.

In June 1937, an order for an initial production batch of 10 two-seat and 30 three-seat Potez 631 day fighters was received, the first five of which were to be delivered by February 1938. As mass production of the Gnome-Rhône 14M engines had not begun and thus was not able to reach the desired production rate of the Potez 630, an additional order was placed for 80 aircraft powered by the alternative Hispano-Suiza engine. The first 48 aircraft to be produced were equipped with Hispano-Suiza 14AB02/03 engines, these were succeeded on later models by the improved Hispano-Suiza 14AB10/11. In December 1937, regular contracts took the place of the provisional letters; a further order for 50 Potez 633 light bombers was also received, bringing the total orders for the type to 180, including the ten prototypes.

During the late 1930s, the Potez 630 received considerable foreign interest, many countries were in the process of re-equipping their air forces. One foreign venture was the acquisition of a licence to manufacture by the Czechoslovak aircraft firm Avia to produce a variant called the Potez 636; none were completed prior to Czechoslovakia's annexation by Nazi Germany in 1938. In 1938, a further 50 Potez 631s were ordered, of which 20 were to be diverted to Finland, although they never reached that country. A number of firm foreign orders was placed with SNCAN for the type; the Republic of China ordered four Potez 631 and five Potez 633, the Kingdom of Yugoslavia ordered two Potez 630 and one Potez 631, the Kingdom of Romania ordered 20 Potez 633, the Kingdom of Greece ordered 24 Potez 633, and Switzerland ordered one Potez 630 and one Potez 633.

In May 1937, series production of the Potez 630 commenced. Manufacturing work on the aircraft's sections and components was shared out amongst SNCAN facilities; the fuselage and tailplanes were produced in Caudebec-en-Caux, Normandy, the wings were made at Le Havre, Normandy, and final assembly was initially performed at Méaulte; the assembly work was later transferred to Les Mureaux. In February 1938, the first production Potez 630 conducted its maiden flight; on 23 February, the French Air Force accepted their first production 630. Early on, production of the Potez 630 was hit by considerable delays, caused by a shortage of engines, propellers, and cannons; the first batch of Potez 630s were armed with four machine guns instead of the two 20 mm Hispano-Suiza cannons. On 2 August 1938, the first Potez 631 was officially accepted.

On 15 March 1938, a big re-equipment and expansion program of the French Air Force, known as Plan V, was approved. While there had been intentions to order a more capable twin-engine aircraft, these were not ready for production, thus the Potez 631 and 633 were retained for this production program, which first involved 207 twin-engined day-and-night fighters along with 449 daytime light bombers. On 25 March 1938, the order for the Potez 633 was increased to 125 bombers, which were also requested to be three-seaters. The Potez 633 orders were cancelled, ordering additional Potez 631 aircraft in their place; further orders of the Potez 631 were placed to allow for the speedy withdrawal of the troublesome Potez 630. Between January and June 1940, an average production rate of 100 aircraft per month was maintained.

== Design ==
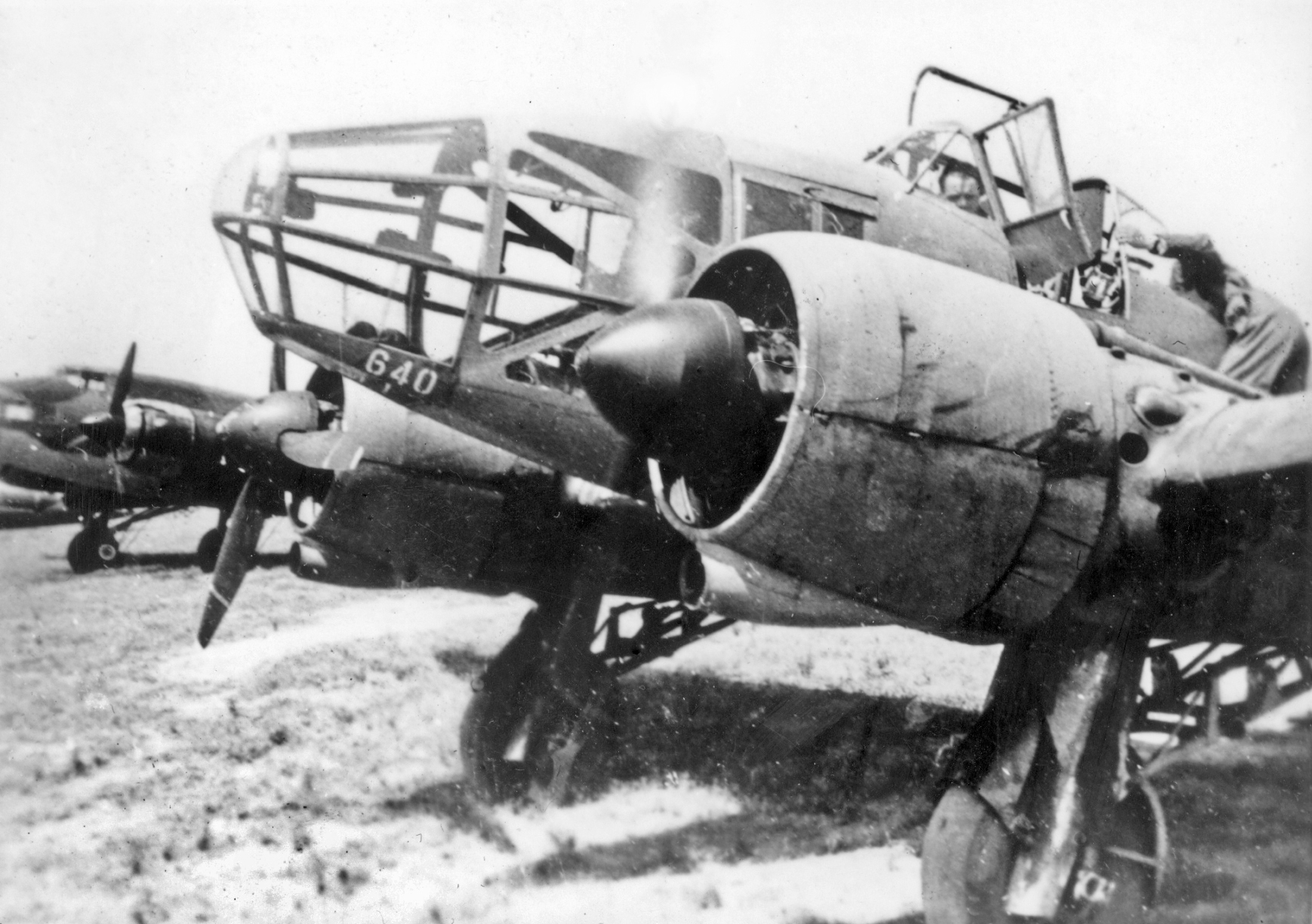
Front of a Potez 63.11

The Potez 630 was a twin engine, all-metal three-seat, finely streamlined monoplane with twin fins and rudders. The basic design allowed for the type to replace obsolete aircraft in the French Air Force in several roles. The long "glasshouse" canopy housed a crew of three, comprising a pilot, an observer or commander who was carried according to the mission requirements, and a rear gunner armed a light machine-gun. The Potez 637 featured a glazed gondola located beneath the fuselage for an observer to be carried in the prone position. Some variants, such as the Potez 631 and 633, had a vertical bomb bay located between the two crew members. The 630 was a relatively simple and sound design, requiring an average of 7,500 man-hours to assemble each aircraft. All members of the family (with the possible exception of the Potez 63.11) shared pleasant flying characteristics and were designed to allow for easy maintenance.

As a day fighter aircraft, the performance of the Potez 631 C3 was relatively disappointing, due to a low maximum speed and inadequate rate of climb compared with contemporary fighter aircraft. As a night fighter, lack of detection equipment drastically limited their effectiveness. Later models had a heavy armament (12 machine guns for the Potez 63.11). The Potez 63 family, as with the contemporary Fairey Battle and Bristol Blenheim bombers and like many French aircraft of the time, proved vulnerable to Messerschmitt Bf 109s. Their similarity to the Messerschmitt Bf 110, both being equipped with twin engines, twin fins and a long greenhouse canopy, is believed to have resulted in several aircraft being lost to "friendly fire".

== Operational service ==
=== Introduction ===
From May 1938, production Potez 630 fighters started to be delivered; the first improved Potez 631 aircraft were received in August that year. Potez 630 and 631s, as two-seaters, were soon used to replace obsolete ANF Les Mureaux 113 as night fighters, while single-seat fighter groups received a number of three-seat Potez 63s to act as command aircraft, from which formations of single-seat fighters would be directed and co-ordinated by radio. In July 1938, the first fifteen Potez 630 aircraft participated in the Villacoublay Air Show.

In May 1938, the Armée de l'Air (French Air Force) placed an order for 125 Potez 633 light bombers; additional orders had also being placed by Romania and Greece for 20 and 24 Potez 633s respectively. France cancelled its order for Potez 633s in the summer of 1938, but further orders for the 633 were placed by Romania (for 20 more aircraft, which had been part built under the French order), and from China, for nine. Deliveries to Romania started late in 1938, with the Greeks receiving their first aircraft in the spring of 1939. In August 1939, with the risk of war increasing the French government requisitioned 32 Potez 633s from the Greek and Romanian orders that were still in France awaiting delivery.

By September 1938, the Potez 630 had begun to supplant the obsolete Bloch MB.200 bomber in the fighter direction role; the Potez 630's engines proved so troublesome in service that most units were rapidly re-equipped with the Potez 631s prior to the outbreak of the Second World War. By 1 April 1939, a total of 77 Potez 630 and 88 Potez 631 aircraft had been accepted by the French Air Force. The retirement of obsolete French aircraft, such as the Morane-Saulnier M.S.225 and Dewoitine D.510, could be accommodated by the increasing numbers of Potez 631s. Just prior to the outbreak of the Second World War, the French Air Force had 85 Potez 630s, 206 Potez 631s, 22 Potez 633s, 63 Potez 633s, and 5 Potez 63.11 aircraft.

The Potez 633 aircraft that were exported to Greece and Romania saw greater service than their French counterparts despite their limited numbers. Greece had nine Potez 633s in service when Italy invaded Greece in October 1940. These were used to bomb Italian supply lines until shortage of spares forced their withdrawal. In June 1941, Romania joined Germany in the invasion of the Soviet Union. Two squadrons were equipped with the Potez 633 which were used to support the Romanian army as it advanced towards Odessa. In 1942, they were replaced by Junkers Ju 88 bombers, allowing the survivors to be transferred to the advanced training role.

=== Second World War ===
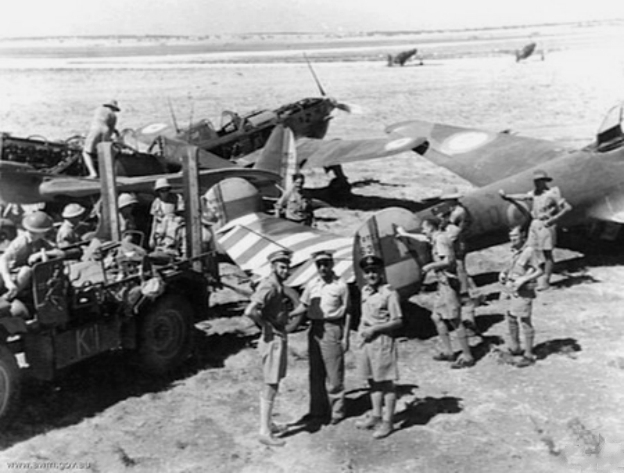
A Potez 630 captured during the Syria–Lebanon Campaign, 1941

On 28 August 1939, the French Air Force mobilised its units, including those equipped with the Potez 630 series. Due to requests from French Naval Aviation some Potez 631 aircraft were diverted to replace their Dewoitine D.371 fighters. In February 1940, a new war plan, Plan V bis, was adopted; under this plan, nearly all Potez 630 and a number of Potez 631 aircraft were retired from front line service, with some of the 630s converted to become dual-control training aircraft. That same month, it was decided to rearm the majority of Potez 631s, replacing their original armament of one cannon and one machine gun with two cannons and four under-wing machine guns for ground attack missions; progress was relatively slow.

The French Air Force found a use for the Potez 633 aircraft as conversion trainers for units that had received the Breguet 691 attack aircraft. On 20 May 1940, three Potez 633s took part in a strafing mission against German troops near Arras. This was the type's only operational mission over France as two days later the aircraft was withdrawn from front-line service. A small number of Potez 633 originally destined for China were commandeered by the French colonial administration in Indochina and saw limited action in the brief French-Thai War in early 1941. Parked in the open, a number of them were destroyed by Thai Hawk 75N strafing during an air raid at Siem Reap.

Once fighting had begun, the Potez 631 quickly proved to be an ineffectual interceptor; it was slower than some German bomber aircraft and 130 km/h (81 mph) slower than the Messerschmitt Bf 109E fighter. Perhaps the most successful unit operating the Potez 631 was the Flottille F1C of the French Naval Air Arm; between 10 and 21 May 1940, aircraft of the unit shot down 12 enemy aircraft in exchange for eight 631s, prior to its withdrawal from operations.

At one point, the Potez 637 was the only modern aircraft equipping the Groupes de Reconnaissance (GOA), which had long been equipped with obsolete aircraft. From November 1939, the first units to convert to the Potez P.63.11 were each assigned three aircraft. By mid-January 1940, there were 43 Potez 63.11s in service with 12 GOAs. By June 1940, more than 700 reconnaissance Potez 63.11 had been delivered. These aircraft encountered various fates in service: more than 220 were destroyed or abandoned. Despite the addition of extra machine gun armament, aircraft having received either six, eight, or ten machine guns, the Potez 63.11 suffered the most losses of any French type. One factor contributing to the high losses was the near-complete lack of spares, rendering 70 percent of all P.63.11 aircraft unserviceable even prior to the German invasion; many aircraft were destroyed on the ground by enemy bombing and strafing attacks and units were wiped out without conducting a mission.

The Potez 63.11 continued in service with the air force of Vichy France and with the forces of the Free French; this led to the two sides operating the type in the North African theatre. The Free French Air Force initially possessed as few as three Potez 630 aircraft but more were captured from the Vichy French Air Force. The Germans initially allowed several Potez 630-equipped units to continue under Vichy French control; these were typically stationed in southern France and North Africa. In the latter theatre they frequently engaged in combat with Allied forces. By 1 November 1941, the Vichy Air Force had 22 Potez 630s, 82 Potez 631s, six Potex 637s and 236 Potez 63.11 aircraft. Large numbers of Axis-aligned Potez 630s stationed in North Africa were destroyed by American bombers during Operation Torch; Allied 630s were also used during the operation to conduct ammunition supply missions and to respond to Luftwaffe aircraft.

On 27 November 1942, German military units occupied Vichy Air Force bases and seized their aircraft; around 134 Potez 630s of several variants were taken. Of the seized aircraft, 53 were refurbished and dispatched to Romania for use as trainers and target tugs; spare engines were also reused to power a number of Luftwaffe Henschel Hs 129Bs. Production of the type was resumed under German control; significant numbers of aircraft appear to have been pressed into service by the Germans, mostly in liaison and training roles. The last three Potez 631s in service were recaptured examples; these made a final contribution following the cessation of hostilities in their use as trainer aircraft at the Centre d'Essais en Vol for the revived French Air Force.

== Variants ==
Unlike many contemporary French aircraft, production of the Potez aircraft was reasonably prompt and the first deliveries were effected before the end of 1938. The 63 had been designed with mass production in mind and as a result, one Potez 630 was cheaper and faster to manufacture than one Morane-Saulnier M.S.406. As production tempo increased, a number of derivatives and experimental models were also developed.

=== Fighter variants ===
A typical feature of the 630 and 631 was the frontal armament, which originally consisted in two 20 mm Hispano-Suiza HS.404 cannons in gondolas under the fuselage, though sometimes one of the cannons was replaced by a MAC 1934 light machine gun (LMG). Later in their career, 631s received four additional LMGs in gondolas under the outer wings, though it was theoretically possible to fit six.

Potez 635 CN2
night fighter project was cancelled
Potez 63.12 C3
with Pratt & Whitney Twin Wasp Junior radials remained a single prototype
Potez 670-01
Fighter prototype
Potez 671
heavy fighters were on the assembly lines when the Germans captured the SNCAN Méaulte factory near Albert.

=== Prototypes ===
Potez 63.01
The first prototype
Potez 630.01
The second prototype
Potez 630 CN.2 No.01
Night-fighter prototype
Potez 631.01
The first Gnome-Rhone powered prototype.

=== Trainer variants ===
Potez 634
A dual control trainer aircraft derivative of the 630 was proposed, which was simply designated as
Potez 631 Ins
(for instruction) 630 conversion with Gnome-Rhône engines
Potez 63.16 T3
A crew trainer derivative of the 63.11 with different, larger wings. Only one prototype was built.

=== Bomber variants ===
Potez 633 B2
two-seater, light level bomber. The Potez 633 retained the fuselage, wings and engines of the 631 but the observer's position and cannon gondolas were deleted and a small bomb bay was added between the pilot and rear gunner. Front armament consisted of a single light machine gun in the nose. The bomb bay could house eight 50 kg-class or two 200 kg (440 lb) -class bombs. There was no bombardier position, as the rear gunner was supposed to direct the bombing run through a periscopic bombsight fitted ahead of him, a disposition that proved unworkable in the field.
Potez 633.01
The first two-seat bomber prototype flew in late 1937. The Armée de l'air ordered 133 Potez 633s in 1938, but two months later decided all aircraft in the light level bomber category should be 3-manned, like the Douglas DB-7 and Bloch MB.175. The French order for 633s was converted into an order for more 631s. The 633 was however offered for export and attracted orders from Romania, China and Greece.

Potez 632 Bp.2
One example of the dive bomber prototype was started, but completed as a 633 however with Hispano-Suiza engines. It was sold to Switzerland for evaluation.
Potez 639 AB2
The single two-seat attack bomber prototype was converted as a standard 633.

=== Reconnaissance variants ===
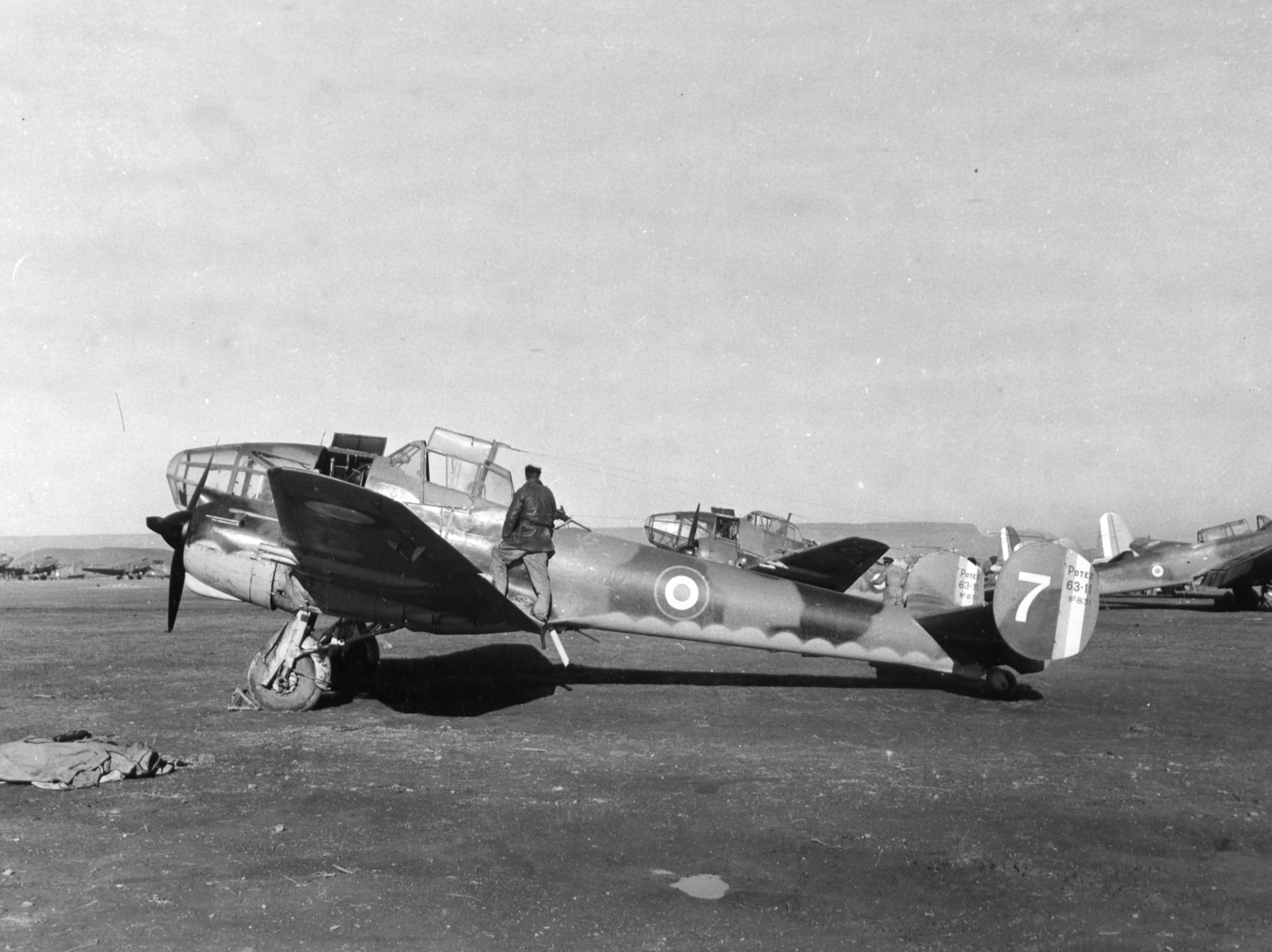
Potez 63.11 in North Africa. January, 1943

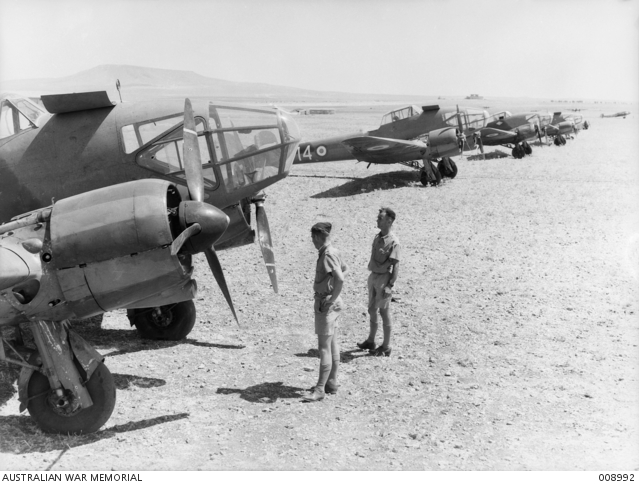
Potez 63.11 at Aleppo, Syria, in June 1941.

Dissatisfied with its strategic reconnaissance aircraft such as the troublesome Bloch MB.131, the Armée de l'air required the development of a derivative of the Potez 631 for this role.

Potez 637
Strategic reconnaissance aircraft. The observer was housed in a gondola under the fuselage; this arrangement resulted in an aircraft that retained most of the qualities of the 631. 60 examples were ordered in August 1938 and delivered.

At the same time, the Armée de l'Air was desperate to re-equip its army cooperation units which had particularly antiquated equipment, but since the development of the 637, had completely changed its mind about how the observer position should be arranged. Potez was therefore required to develop a variant that, while retaining the wings, engines and tail surfaces of the 631, hosted the observer in a more conventional nose glasshouse.

Potez 63.11
Because the pilot needed to be seated above the observer, the fuselage was taller, which resulted in reduced top speed and manoeuvrability. As a result, the 63.11 proved very vulnerable, despite being protected with some armour and basic self-sealing coating over the fuel tanks. As a secondary light bomber capability was part of the requirements (though it was rarely if ever used), the fuselage accommodated a tiny bomb bay, carrying up to eight 10 kg-class bombs. This bomb bay was replaced by an additional fuel tank on late examples. Additionally, two 50 kg-class bombs could be carried on hardpoints under the inner wings. Frontal armament was originally one, then three MAC 1934s under the nose, and many 63.11s were equipped with the same additional guns in wing gondolas as the 631s.

The first Potez 63.11 No.1 and second No.2 prototypes first flew in December 1938, and no less than 1,365 examples were on order in September 1939, of which 730 were delivered, making the 63.11 the most numerous variant of the family by far.

== Operators ==
France

- French Air Force (Armée de l'air)
- French Naval Aviation (Aviation Navale/Aéronautique navale)

Vichy France

- Vichy French Air Force (Armée de l'air de l'Armistice)

Free France

- Free French Air Forces (Forces Aériennes Françaises Libres)

Germany

- Luftwaffe

Greece

- Royal Hellenic Air Force

Kingdom of Hungary

- Royal Hungarian Air Force operated 40 Potez 63.11 advanced trainers.

Italy

- Regia Aeronautica

Poland

- Polish Air Forces on exile in France
  - Depot d'Instruction de l'Aviation Polonaise at Lyon-Bron operated two Potez 63.11 aircraft.

Kingdom of Romania

- Royal Romanian Air Force

Switzerland

- Swiss Air Force operated one Potez 630C3 and one 632B2 aircraft.

Kingdom of Yugoslavia

- Yugoslav Royal Air Force

=== Civil operators ===
- (France) Air Bleu (two aircraft converted into mail carriers)

== Specifications (Potez 63.11A.3) ==
3-view drawing of the Potez 630

Potez 63.11 of Groupe Autonome d'Observation (GAO) 510

Data from War Planes of the Second World War: Volume Eight: Bombers and Reconnaissance Aircraft The Potez 63 Series

General characteristics

- Crew: 3
- Length: 10.93 m (35 ft 10 in)
- Wingspan: 16 m (52 ft 6 in)
- Height: 3.08 m (10 ft 1 in)
- Wing area: 32.7 m^{2} (352 sq ft)
- Empty weight: 3,135 kg (6,911 lb)
- Gross weight: 4,530 kg (9,987 lb)
- Powerplant: 1 × Gnome-Rhône 14M-04 14-cylinder air-cooled radial piston engine, 522 kW (700 hp) LH rotation
- Powerplant: 1 × Gnome-Rhône 14M-05 14-cylinder air-cooled radial piston engine, 522 kW (700 hp) RH rotation
- Propellers: 3-bladed variable-pitch propellers

Performance

- Maximum speed: 425 km/h (264 mph, 229 kn) 5,500 m (18,000 ft)
- Cruise speed: 299 km/h (186 mph, 161 kn) at 4,500 m (14,800 ft)
- Range: 1,500 km (930 mi, 810 nmi)
- Service ceiling: 8,500 m (27,900 ft)
- Rate of climb: 8.4 m/s (1,650 ft/min)

Armament

- Guns: (original armament)
  - 1 × fixed, forward-firing 7.5 mm MAC 1934 machine gun
  - 1 × fixed, rearward-firing 7.5 mm MAC 1934 machine gun
  - 1 × flexibly mounted, rearward-firing 7.5 mm MAC 1934 machine gun
- (Final armament)
  - 3 × fixed forward firing machine guns under fuselage
  - 4 × fixed, forward firing machine guns under outer wings
  - 3 × semi fixed, rearward firing machine guns in ventral mount
  - 2 × flexibly mounted machine guns in aft cockpit
- Bombs: 4 × 50 kg (110 lb) bombs

== See also ==
Aircraft of comparable role, configuration, and era

- Bristol Blenheim
- Fokker G.I
- Messerschmitt Bf 110
- Mitsubishi Ki-46
- Nakajima J1N
- Petlyakov Pe-2

Related lists

- List of interwar military aircraft
- List of aircraft of World War II
- List of aircraft of the French Air Force during World War II

== Sources ==
- Axworthy, Mark (September–October 1999). "Flank Guard: Romania's Advance on Stalingrad, Part Two". Air Enthusiast (65): 72–75. ISSN 0143-5450.
- Breffort, Dominique and Jouineau, André. French Aircraft from 1939 to 1942, Vol.2: from Dewoitine to Potez. Paris, France: Histoire & Collections, 2005. ISBN 2-915239-49-5.
- Brindley, John.F. French Fighters of World War Two. Windsor, UK: Hylton Lacy Publishers Ltd., 1971. ISBN 978-0-85064-015-1.
- Danel, Raymond. The Potez 63 Series (Aircraft in Profile Number 195). Leatherhead, Surrey, UK: Profile Publications, 1967. No ISBN.
- Ehrengardt, C.-J. (January 1970). "L'action de la chasse de nuit française: un épisode peu connu de la dernière guerre" [French Night-fighter Activity: A Little-known Episode of the Last War]. Le Album de Fanatique de l'Aviation (in French). No. 7. pp. 8–12. ISSN 0757-4169.
- Ehrengardt, C.-J. "Le Potez 63 et dérivés". Aéro-Editions, November 2005.
- Ehrengardt, Christian-Jacques (June–July 2005). "Le Potez 63.11 au combat: Sept.39–Juin 40". Aéro-Journal (in French). No. 43. pp. 6–37. ISSN 0336-1055.
- Fernandez, Jose. Potez 63 family. Sandomierz, Poland/Redbourn, UK: Mushroom Model Publications, 2008. ISBN 978-83-89450-65-4.
- Green, William. War Planes of the Second World War, Volume I: Fighters. London: Macdonald & Co.(Publishers), 1960. ISBN 0-356-01445-2.
- Green, William. War Planes of the Second World War, Volume VIII: Bombers and Reconnaissance Aircraft. London: Macdonald & Co.(Publishers), 1967. ISBN 0-356-01478-9.
- Jackson, R. (1974). Air War over France 1939–40 (1st ed.). London: Ian Allan. ISBN 978-0-7110-0510-5.
- Kotelnikov, V.; Kulikov, V. & Cony, C. (December 2001). "Les avions français en URSS, 1921–1941" [French Aircraft in the USSR, 1921–1941]. Avions: Toute l'Aéronautique et son histoire (in French) (105): 50–56. ISSN 1243-8650.
- Marchand, Patrick; Takamori, Junko (2003). Les Potez 63, Les Ailes de Gloire No. 9 [The Potez 63, Wings of Glory No. 9] (in French). Le Muy, France: Editions d'Along. ISBN 2-914403-12-7.
- Pelletier, Alain (2002). French Fighters of World War II. Carrollton, TX: Squadron/Signal Publications. ISBN 0-89747-440-6.
- Young, Edward M. (1984). "France's Forgotten Air War". Air Enthusiast. No. 25. pp. 22–33. ISSN 0143-5450.
