= Bréguet 693 =

1938 attack aircraft family by Breguet

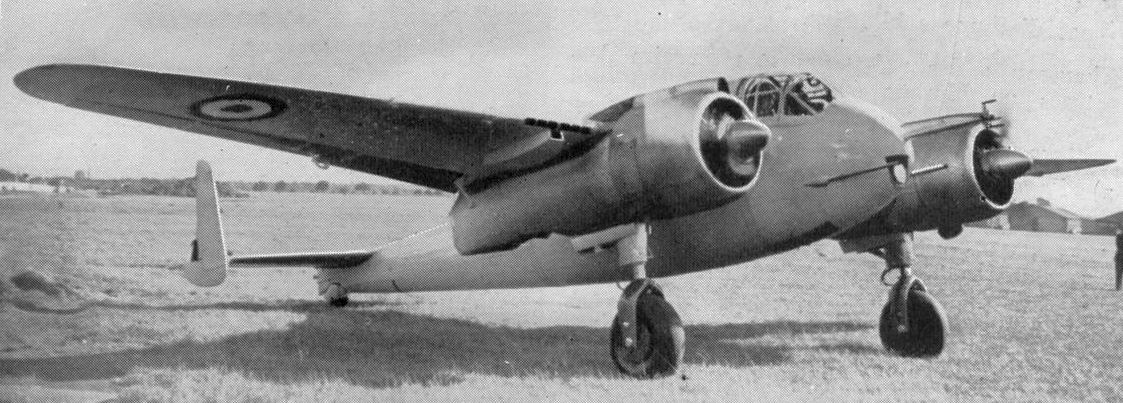
- Bréguet 690 prototype

General information
- Type: Ground-attack aircraft
- Manufacturer: Bréguet (SNCAC)
- Designer: Georges Ricard
- Primary users: French Air Force Vichy French Air Force; Regia Aeronautica
- Number built: approx. 230

History
- Manufactured: 1939–1940
- Introduction date: 1939
- First flight: 23 March 1938
- Retired: 1942

The Bréguet 690 and its derivatives were a series of light twin-engine ground-attack aircraft that were used by the French Air Force in World War II. The aircraft was intended to be easy to maintain, forgiving to fly, and capable of 480 km/h (300 mph) at 4,000 m (13,000 ft). The type's sturdy construction was frequently demonstrated and the armament was effective. French rearmament began two years later than that in Britain and none of these aircraft were available in sufficient numbers to make a difference in 1940.

== Design and development ==
=== Bréguet 690 ===
The Bréguet 690 had begun life in 1934 as the Bre 630, the Bréguet Aviation entry for the Service Technique Aéronautiques (STAé, Aeronautical Technical Service) Chasse, triplace specification of October 1934 along with the Hanriot H 220, Loire-Nieuport LN-20, Romano R.110 and the Potez 630. The Bréguet 630 was a twin-engined monoplane with twin tailplanes and Hispano-Suiza 14AB 02/03 (port and starboard) 14-cylinder air-cooled radial engines, both rotating inwards to limit torque problems if one engine failed. The aircraft was armed with two forward-firing Hispano-Suiza HS.404 cannon and a 7.5 mm MAC 1934 machine-gun firing rearwards for aft defence. The Potez 630 won the C3 competition but Bréguet began construction of the prototype Bréguet 690 in 1935, without an order from the Armée de l'Air, which was not placed until 26 March 1937. Completion of the Bréguet 690-01 was slowed by a ten-month delay in the delivery of its engines from Hispano-Suiza. The Bre 690-01 was finished in early 1938 and flew on 23 March, revealing no serious design flaws and was sent to the Centre d'Essais de Matériels Aériens (CEMA, the Air Equipment Test Center) at Vélizy-Villacoublay Air Base for testing.

=== Bréguet 690-01 ===
The tests showed that the Bre 690-01 performed well, in some aspects surpassing the Potez 630. The encouraging test results led to the order of a hundred Bréguet 691 AB2 (Assaut Bombardement Biplace, Two-seater Attack Bomber) on 14 June 1938. Bréguet replaced the navigator's position with a bomb-bay and bomb-racks, the port 20 mm cannon was changed for two 7.5 mm MAC 1934 machine-guns, the forward-firing guns capable of being depressed by 15° for ground strafing. The undercarriage was altered, the oil cooler intakes were moved from the wings to the engine nacelles and fuel capacity was increased from 705 to 985 L (155 to 217 imp gal; 186 to 260 US gal). The first hundred Bre 691 aircraft had 520 kW (700 hp) Hispano-Suiza 14AB10/11 radials and from then the 556 kW (745 hp)14 AB 12/13 radials, the first fifty aircraft having Ratier and later aircraft Hamilton-Standard three-bladed, variable-pitch propellers. The order for a hundred aircraft was doubled.

=== Production ===
Bréguet quickly established an assembly line and the first production aircraft Bréguet (Bre) 691-01 flew less than a year after being ordered; the type was in service before the end of 1939. As with the Potez 630, the Bre 691 was beset with engine difficulties. Hispano-Suiza had decided to concentrate on its V12 liquid-cooled engines and the 14AB engine was unreliable. The French authorities decided to limit Bréguet 691 production run to 78 aircraft, instead of 100. Orders were placed for another version, the Bre 693 powered by Gnome-Rhône 14M radials. Apart from the different engines, which were of slightly smaller diameter, the two types were virtually identical. Orders for the Bre 691 were switched to the new type and more than 120 of the latter had been completed by the time of the débâcle of the Allied defeat in June 1940. Late production versions of the Bre 693 introduced propulsive exhaust pipes that improved top speed by a small margin as well as, according to some sources, another two machine-guns in the rear of each engine nacelle. Belgium ordered 32 licence-built copies but none was completed before the Belgian collapse. French engine makers had even greater difficulties than airframe manufacturers in keeping up with demand from 1938 and in 1939 the French government decided that all combat aircraft had to be adapted for British and US engines. Fewer than 250 Bréguet 690 series aircraft were completed. The Armée de l'air received only 211 aircraft, 78 Bre.691s, 124 Bre.693s and nine Bre.695s; the Germans captured several complete or near-complete aircraft at the factories.

== Operational history ==
A small experimental unit had been investigating ground-attack tactics since 1937, initially in outdated biplanes such as the Potez 25, then in ANF Les Mureaux 115 monoplanes. Eventually, the Armée de l'Air concluded that low-altitude level bombing was more suitable than dive-bombing for engaging enemy vehicles and artillery on the battlefield. The chosen tactic consisted in a hedge hopping approach at maximum speed, followed by a strafing run or the delivery of time-delayed bombs directly over the target. French commanders widely considered this tactic safe for the attackers, as anti-aircraft weapons then in service would be inefficient. The French Army was not using anti-aircraft autocannon at the time (the 25 mm Hotchkiss and Oerlikon 20 mm cannon were issued only later), relying instead on rifle-calibre machine guns and slow-firing 75 mm (3.0 in) guns.

In late 1939, two squadrons transferred from level bomber units were gathered in the small airfield near Vinon-sur-Verdon, where they began their operational training. As Bréguet 691s were not available, the crews flew the Potez 633 light bomber. When they were delivered, the Bréguets were popular with their crews, although the unreliable engines in the Bre 691 affected aircraft serviceability and undercarriage failures proved especially troublesome. Only in March 1940 were the first combat-worthy Bre. 693s delivered and there were now five squadrons to equip, GBA I/51, GBA II/51, GBA I/54, GBA II/54, and GBA II/35 (GBA, Groupe de bombardement d'assaut, attack bomber squadron), with a theoretical complement of 13 aircraft each.

Because of late deliveries, crews were still working up their new machines and developing tactics when the Battle of France began. On 12 May, GBA I/54 and GBA II/54 performed the Bréguet's first operational sorties, against German motorized columns in the Liège–Tongeren–Maastricht area. German anti-aircraft fire shot down eight of the eighteen Bre.693s. The disastrous results of this first engagement forced the French commanders to reconsider their tactics. Until 15 May, GBA crews performed shallow dive attacks from higher altitude, which resulted in reduced losses but the attacks had clearly been inaccurate, as the Bréguet lacked a bombsight. On subsequent missions, the GBAs reintroduced low-level attacks in smaller formations. As the position of the French and Allied armies grew steadily more desperate, the assault groups were engaged daily, still enduring losses to anti-aircraft fire but also increasingly to German fighters.

In late June, the Armée de l'Air tried to evacuate its modern aircraft to North Africa, from where many hoped to continue the fight. The short-ranged Bréguets were not deemed able to cross the Mediterranean. Unlike other modern French types, the Bréguet 690 family saw its combat career end with the Armistice. By this time, 104 aircraft had been lost and 14 were written off in November 1940 (most of these had also been destroyed or damaged beyond repair during the campaign). Out of 205 Bréguets delivered to the Armée de l'Air, 58 per cent were lost. The five GBAs suffered crew casualties of around 50 per cent.

After the Armistice, the Vichy authorities were allowed to maintain a small air force in mainland France and its assault bomber pilots flew rare training flights in the Bre.693 and Bre.695. After Case Anton, the German occupation of all of France in late 1942, some of the survivors in the Italian occupation zone were transferred to Italy but were not used. The Germans ordered the completion of several unfinished aircraft after the Armistice that were used as advanced trainers.

== Variants ==
Bre 690.01
Bréguet 690 prototype.
Bre 691.01
Bréguet 691 prototype.
Bre 691
Two-seat twin-engine ground-attack aircraft.
Bre 693.01
Bréguet 693 prototype.
Bre 693
Two-seat twin-engine ground-attack aircraft.
Bre 694.01
Prototype intended to be two or three-seat tactical reconnaissance aircraft.

S 10
Swedish reconnaissance variant of the export Bre 694 which would have had Swedish equipment and armament. 12 ordered but cancelled due to the war.

Bre 695.01
Bre 695 prototype.
Bre 695
A conversion of a Bre 693, was not particularly successful, the larger, heavier and higher-drag Pratt & Whitney R-1535 Twin Wasp Junior engines reducing visibility and providing only a minor performance improvement at lower altitudes. Only a few 695s were operationally used before the armistice.
Bre 696.01
A two-seat light bomber prototype, which was first ordered and then cancelled in favour of the Bre 693.
Bre 697
Intended as a pre-prototype for the Breguet 700 C2 heavy fighter. Powered by Gnome-Rhône 14N-48/Gnome-Rhône 14N-49 engines which offered 50% more power than the 14M, the Bre 697 prototype displayed a sensational rate of climb, and was as fast as a Bf 109E. The Bre 700 was expected to offer even higher speed and would have been very heavily armed.
Bre 810
Bre 693 modified for carrier usage, adopted by the Aeronavale in 1939 for use aboard the Joffre class carriers. Had folding wings and could carry a torpedo.

== Operators ==
France
French Air Force

Vichy France
Vichy French Air Force

Nazi Germany
Luftwaffe

Kingdom of Italy
Regia Aeronautica. Several aircraft captured, never brought back into service.

== Specifications (Bre.693 AB.2) ==
3-views of the Bréguet 693

Data from William Green, Aircraft of the Third Reich (2010) unless indicated

General characteristics

- Crew: 2
- Length: 9.67 m (31 ft 9 in)
- Wingspan: 15.37 m (50 ft 5 in)
- Height: 3.19 m (10 ft 6 in)
- Wing area: 29.2 m^{2} (314 sq ft)
- Empty weight: 3,010 kg (6,636 lb)
- Max takeoff weight: 4,900 kg (10,803 lb)
- Powerplant: 2 × Gnome-Rhône 14M-6 / Gnome-Rhône 14M-7 14 cyl. handed air-cooled radial piston engines, 522 kW (700 hp) each
- Propellers: 3-bladed variable-pitch propellers

Performance

- Maximum speed: 490 km/h (300 mph, 260 kn) at 5,000 m (16,000 ft)
- Cruise speed: 400 km/h (250 mph, 220 kn) at 4,000 m (13,000 ft)
- Range: 1,350 km (840 mi, 730 nmi)
- Service ceiling: 8,500 m (27,900 ft)
- Rate of climb: 9.25 m/s (1,821 ft/min)
- Time to altitude: 4,000 m (13,000 ft) in 7 minutes 12 seconds

Armament

- Guns:
  - 1 × fixed, forward-firing 20 mm Hispano-Suiza HS.404 cannon
  - 2 × fixed, forward-firing 7.5 mm (.295 in) MAC 1934 machine guns
  - 1 × flexible, rearward-firing 7.5 mm (.295 in) MAC 1934 machine gun in rear cockpit
  - 1 × fixed, rearward-firing 7.5 mm (.295 in) MAC 1934 machine gun in ventral position
- Bombs:
  - 460 kg (1,010 lb)

== See also ==
Aircraft of comparable role, configuration, and era

- Breda Ba.88 Lince
- Focke-Wulf Fw 187
- Fokker G.I
- Henschel Hs 129
- IMAM Ro.58
- Kawasaki Ki-45
- Messerschmitt Bf 110
- Potez 630

Related lists

- List of aircraft of World War II

== Bibliography ==
- Ehrengardt, C. J. (2002). "Voyage au bout de l'enfer: les Bréguet au combat" [Journey to the end of Hell: the Bréguet in Battle]. Aéro-Journal (in French) (28). ISSN 0336-1055.
- Ehrengardt, Christian-Jacques (May–June 2018). "Aller simple vers l'enfer: l'aviation d'assaut de l'Armée de l'Air en mai-juin 1940" [One-way Trip to Hell: The Air Force's assault aviation in May–June 1940]. Aérojournal (in French) (HS n°30). Aix-en-Provence: 52–97. ISSN 2103-7922.
- Green, William (2010). Aircraft of the Third Reich. London: Aerospace Publishing. ISBN 978-1-900732-06-2.
- Green, William (1967). War Planes of the Second World War: Bombers and Reconnaissance Aircraft. Vol. VII. London: Macdonald. ISBN 978-0-356-01477-7.
- Notice descriptive et d'utilisation de l'avion Bréguet 691 AB2 à moteurs Hispano-Suiza [Description and use of the Bréguet 691 AB2 aircraft with Hispano-Suiza engines]. Paris: Ministère de l'Air. 1939.
- Pelletier, Alain (2003). French Bombers of World War II in Action. Aircraft (No. 189). Carrollton, Tx: Squadron/Signal Publications. ISBN 0-89747-458-9.
- Taylor, John W. R.; Alexander, Jean (1969). Combat Aircraft of the World. New York: G.P. Putnam's Sons. ISBN 0-71810-564-8.
