= Boeing Model 6D =

Seaplane by Boeing

Model 6D
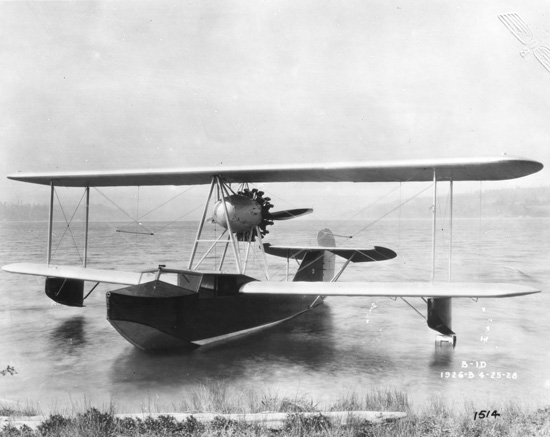

General information
- Type: Passenger Flying-Boat
- National origin: United States
- Manufacturer: Boeing
- Number built: 10 of all models

History
- First flight: April 1928
- Variant: Boeing Model 204

The Boeing Model 6D, a.k.a. Boeing Model 6E, Boeing B-1D and Boeing B-1E, was an American pusher biplane flying-boat built by Boeing between 1928 and 1929.

== Development and design ==
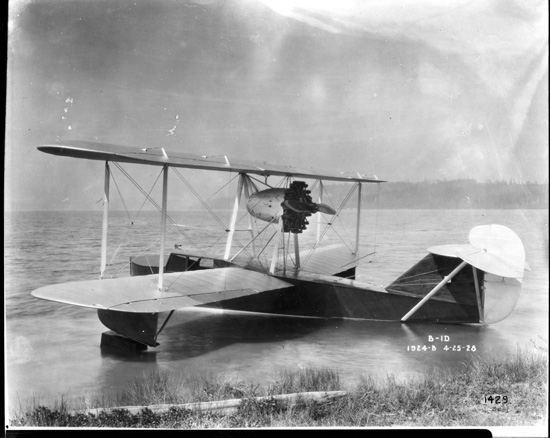
Boeing Model B-1D or Model 6D

The Model 6D continued the designation series of the 1919 Boeing Model 6 but the only similarity was that they are both biplane pusher flying-boats. The 6D was designed in 1928 and 2 aircraft were built between May 1928 and April 1929. The 6Ds rectangular hull was constructed of wood with wood longerons, covered in spruce veneer. Wings were taken from the Model 40 and shortened, with the pusher engine and wood propeller mounted on the lower side of the upper wing.

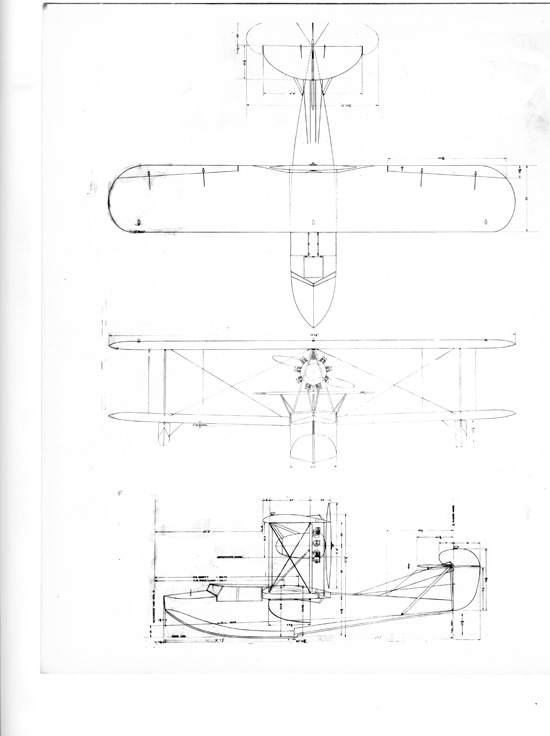
Boeing model B1D/6D drawing

A slightly heavier, more robustly built version, powered by a 410 hp (310 kW) Pratt & Whitney R-1340 Wasp engine, was produced as the B-1E / Model 204 / Model 204A.

== Variants ==
B-1D
2:Two aircraft powered by 220 hp (160 kW) Wright J-5 Whirlwind 9-cyl radial engines
B-1E
Almost identical to the B-1D with strengthened structure, the B-1E was powered by a 410 hp (310 kW) Pratt & Whitney R-1340 Wasp. Five aircraft were built, of a batch of ten, the remaining aircraft were re-designated Model 204.
Model 204
Five B-1E airframes re-designated before completion. Only two were completed by Boeing, one Model 204 and one Model 204A, with a third completed by a private party using the c/n and registration of the original airframe.
Model 204A
The second Model 204 airframe completed as a dual-control trainer for William E. Boeing.

== Specifications (B-1D) ==
Data from Boeing aircraft since 1916, Jane's all the World's Aircraft 1928

General characteristics

- Crew: 1
- Capacity: 3 pax
- Length: 30 ft 9 in (9.37 m)
- Wingspan: 39 ft 8.25 in (12.0968 m)
- Height: 12 ft (3.7 m)
- Wing area: 466 sq ft (43.3 m^{2})
- Airfoil: Boeing 103
- Empty weight: 2,442 lb (1,108 kg)
- Gross weight: 3,442 lb (1,561 kg)
- Powerplant: 1 × Wright J-5 Whirlwind 9-cylinder air-cooled radial piston engine, 220 hp (160 kW)
- Propellers: 2-bladed wooden fixed pitch pusher propeller

Performance

- Maximum speed: 95 mph (153 km/h, 83 kn)
- Cruise speed: 80 mph (130 km/h, 70 kn)
- Stall speed: 52 mph (84 km/h, 45 kn)
- Range: 175 mi (282 km, 152 nmi)
- Service ceiling: 12,000 ft (3,700 m)
- Time to altitude: 3,400 ft (1,000 m) in 10 minutes
- Wing loading: 7.4 lb/sq ft (36 kg/m^{2})
- Power/mass: 0.09 hp/lb (0.15 kW/kg)
