= Boeing-Canada A-213 Totem =

1930s Canadian patrol and utility flying boat

A-213 Totem
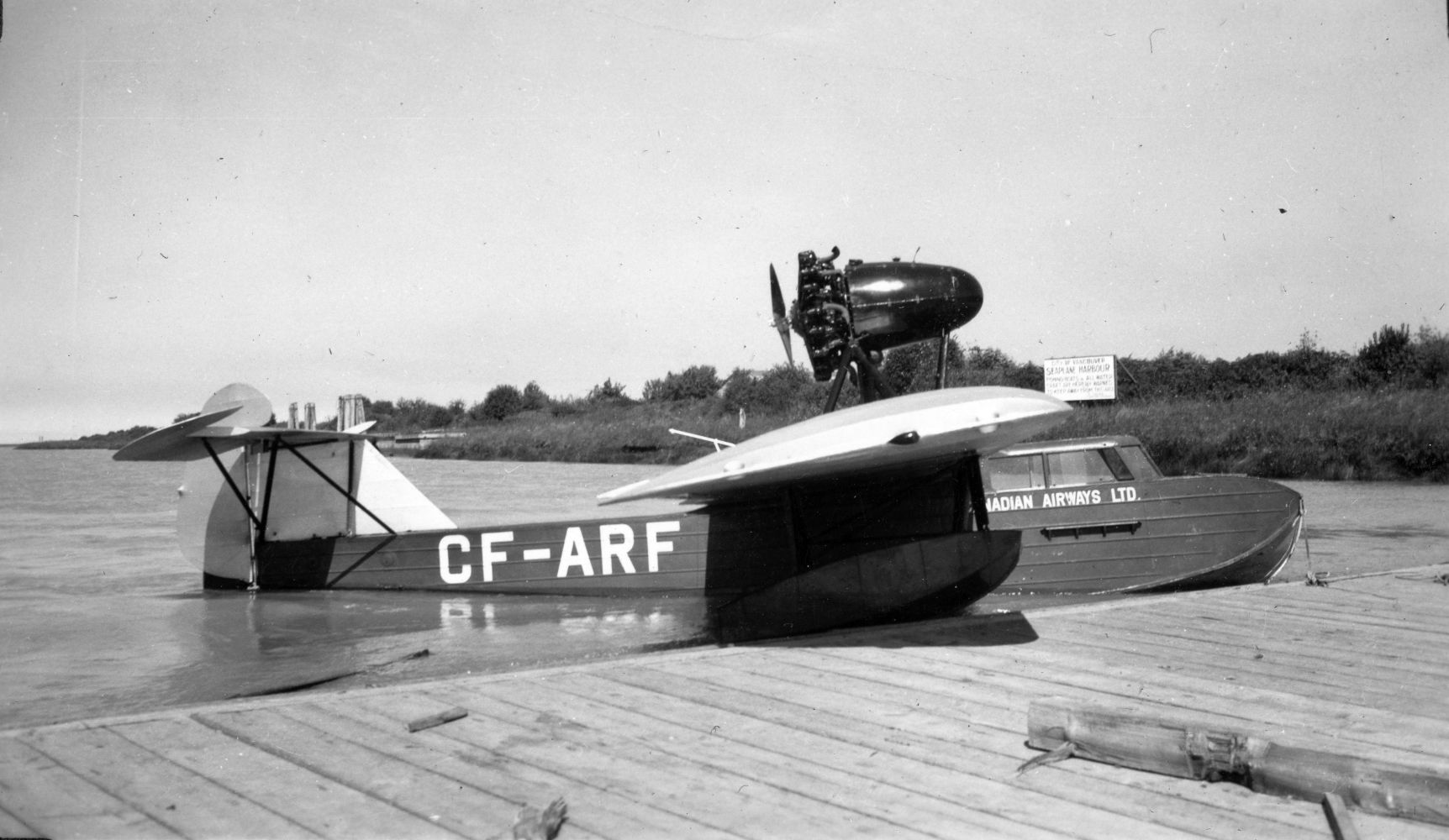

General information
- Type: Utility and fisheries seaplane
- National origin: Canada
- Manufacturer: Boeing Aircraft of Canada
- Designer: Captain Edward Fothergill Elderton
- Status: Scrapped in 1942
- Primary users: Canadian Airways Boeing Aircraft of Canada
- Number built: 1

History
- Introduction date: 1932
- First flight: June 1932

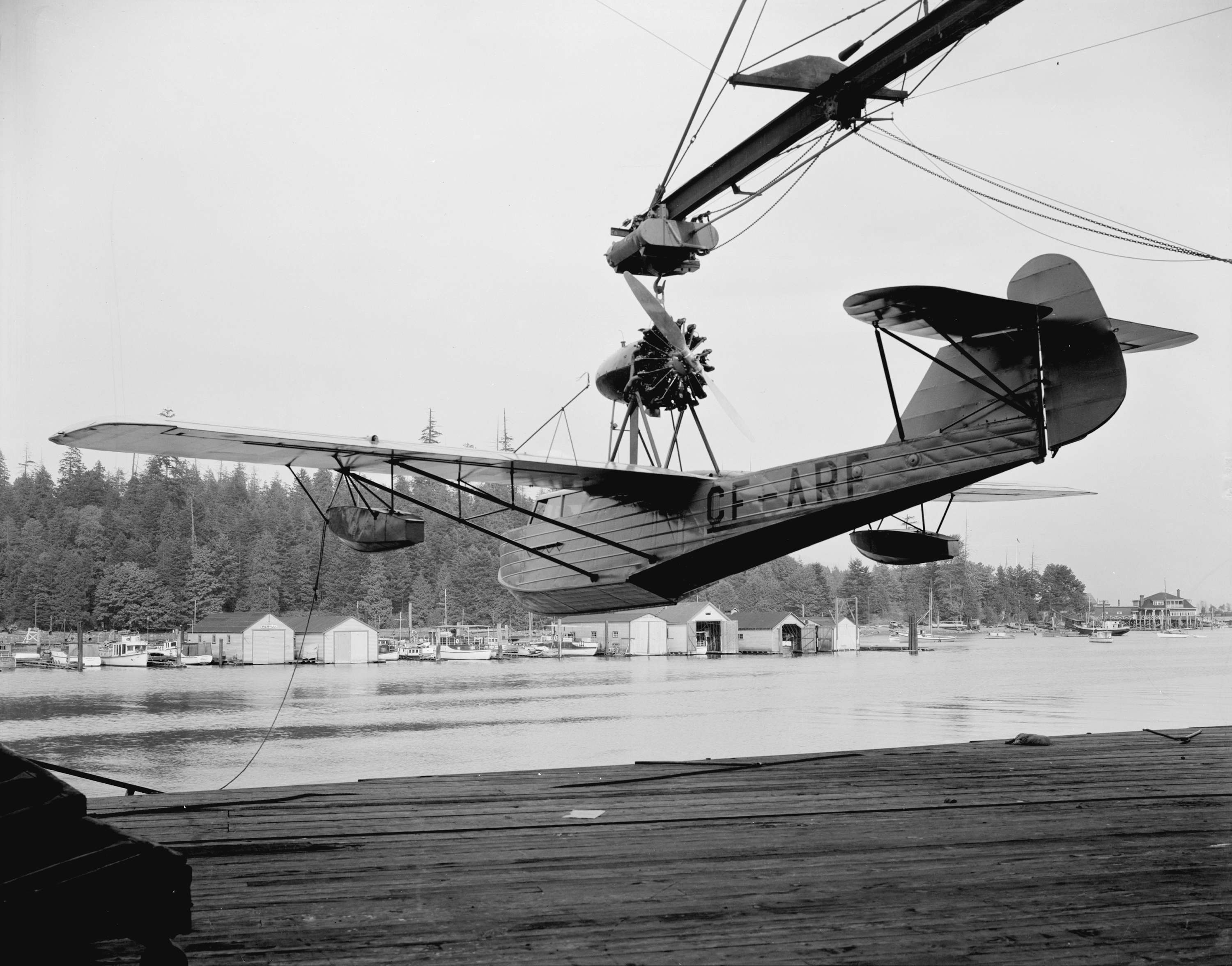
Boeing-Canada Totem on hoist

The Boeing-Canada A-213 Totem was a Canadian single-engine pusher monoplane flying boat intended for forestry and fisheries patrols as well as a light utility transport for the British Columbia coastline, where there are few flat places for runways, and waterways are plentiful. The sole example, CF-ARF, CB10 was designed and built by Boeing Aircraft of Canada. The name refers to the Totem poles used by the First Nations in British Columbia.

== Design ==
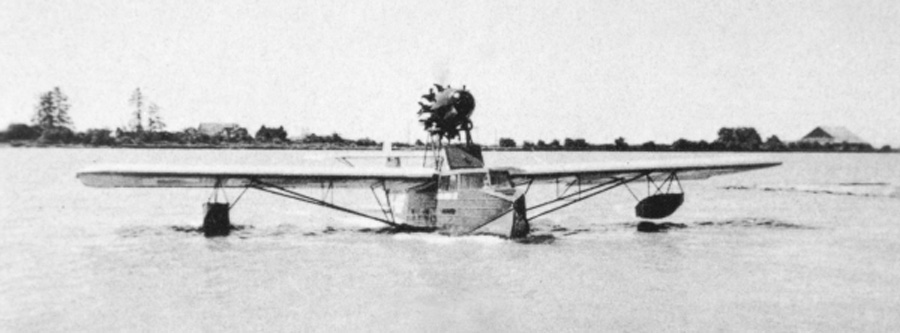
Boeing-Canada A-213 Totem taxiing across the water

The Chief Engineer, Edward Fothergill Elderton was British, and had previously worked at Short Brothers and Saunders-Roe before coming to Canada to work for Canadian Vickers and Boeing of Canada.

Despite being developed while the Boeing 40H-4 and C-204 were under construction, the Totem's design owed little to Boeing aside from the Boeing 103 airfoil section and the rudder shape. Indeed, previous Boeing flying boats used wood extensively in the hull, and the 40H-4 used welded steel tubes for its fuselage structure. Instead, its tumblehome and heavy external ribs on the hull showed a strong Saunders-Roe influence, which is unsurprising given the Chief Engineer's background. The model number A-213 fits numerically in the Boeing sequence but the significance of the 'A' prefix remains unexplained. It may be a coincidence that Saunders-Roe was using an A as a prefix for all their aircraft at that time.

The bottom of the hull was built up as a three-ply Alclad sandwich, riveted to frames with external longitudinal stringers. The sides and top of the hull used sheet metal with widely spaced corrugations or ribs. There were five bulkheads separating six watertight compartments, and it made extensive use of stainless steel components to limit corrosion. The roomy 4 seat cabin was positioned ahead of the front wing spar and was accessed through a folding roof hatch. Dual controls were offered, while the stick could be removed on the passenger side. The main fuel tank was behind the cabin and between the wing spars, with a smaller fuel tank in the engine nacelle that was fed by a fuel pump. The Wasp Jr. radial engine was mounted as a pusher, which made passenger egress safer, and reduced cabin noise. Starting was accomplished with an inertial hand starter.

The wings were built around two spruce spars, with ribs and leading and trailing edges in spot welded chromium-molybdenum alloy (chrome-moly) steel, all covered in fabric sealed and tightened with aircraft dope. The wings were braced with parallel steel struts to the hull chines, and fitted with metal tip floats. The high mounted elevators, fin and rudder were like the ribs, made up from spot welded chrome-moly steel, covered in fabric. All controls were actuated via push-pull rods, with no cables or pulleys to jam. Unusually for the time, a retractable water rudder was fitted that would pivot back and up if it struck an obstacle.

== Operational history ==
The sole Totem built, serial number CB10 was registered as CF-ARF. The first known flight is believed to have been on 16 June 1932, by William J. Holland. Test flights were being made in July by company pilots, and on September 25, an official test flight was made, with government observers. One of the test flights was to Garibaldi Lake, the first visit by an airplane to that lake, at an altitude of 4,869 ft (1,484 m) where it experienced no difficulties.

Boeing of Canada had been having difficulty selling its flying boats, and the Totem was no exception, with it remaining in Boeing's hands for almost a year before being sold to a private operator.

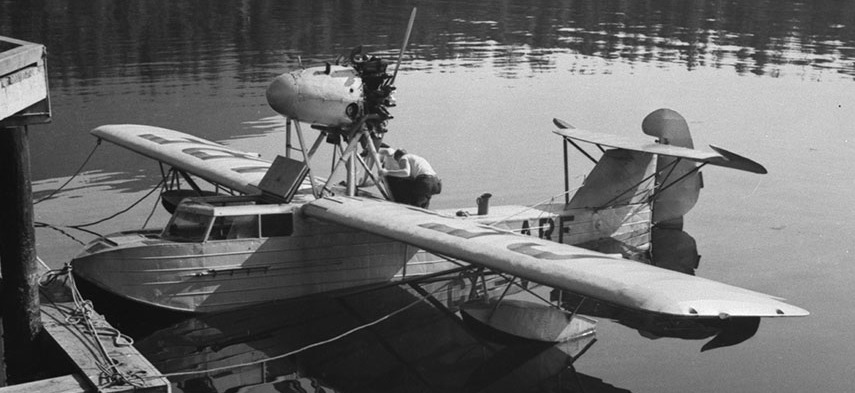
The Totem while with its final owner.

In May 1933, the Victoria Daily Times reported that Holland was taking the president of United Aircraft and Transport Corporation, (part owner of both Boeing and Boeing of Canada) for a "leisurely" flight up the British Columbia coastline to Juneau, Alaska. In July 1933, Holland took the Totem to Amethyst Lake in Jasper National Park, to Lake Louise in Banff National Park and to Lake Minnewanka. He gave joyrides to the locals for $5 a flight, while also occasionally doing local charters, including taking the manager of the Banff Springs Hotel to the Columbia Icefield and another longer one for a group of fishermen to Marvel Lake (north of Marvel Peak). The Totem was not the first aircraft to visit Banff though, as they were preceded by a Norman Thompson N.T.2B flying boat operated by the Rocky Mountain Aviation Transport Company between 1921 and 1924. Holland was notified in August that the Totem had been sold and to make haste back to Vancouver to transfer the airplane to the new owner.

The new owner only kept it for a couple of years before selling it to Canadian Airways in May 1935. This was despite demonstrating excellent water and flight handling characteristics during official tests and in operational service. It would remain in service until January 1938, mainly carrying out fisheries patrols, until they sold it to another private operator in 1938. Its registration was cancelled in February 1942, and presumably scrapped.

The Totem served most of its career in British Columbia, however it would remain a one-off as pure-flying boats were by then being supplanted by floatplanes.

== Operators ==
Canada

- Boeing Aircraft of Canada - operated for one year until sold to private operator in August 1933.
- Canadian Airways - operated from May 1935 to January 1938 for fisheries patrols, although charter flights were also made
- Private operators - barnstorming and light transport from August 1933 to May 1935 by V. Spencer and January 1938 to late 1941 or early 1942 by W.J. Dyson.

== Specifications (Boeing A-213 Totem) ==
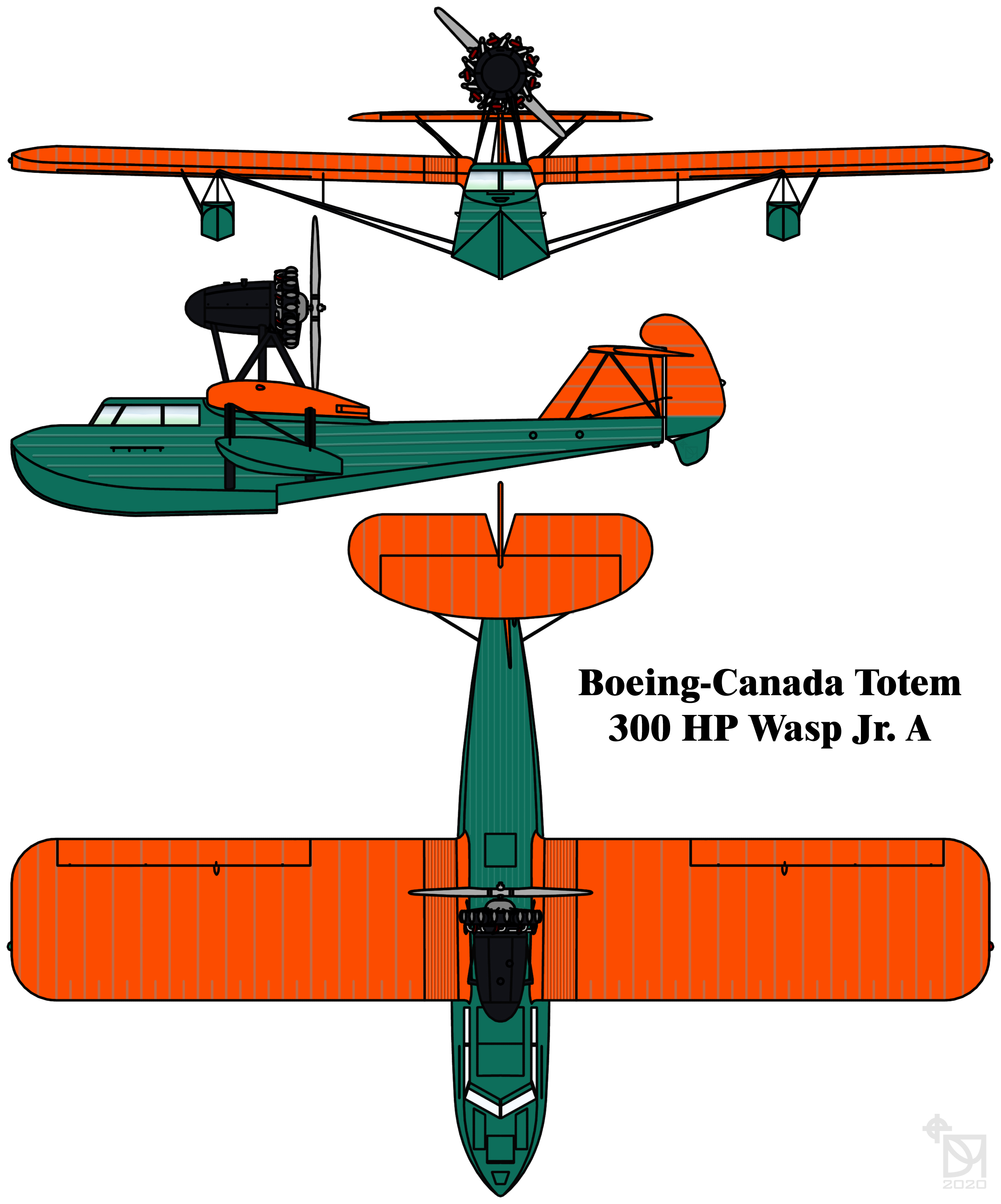
Boeing Totem drawing

Data from Flight, 1932, p.890-892

General characteristics

- Crew: one (but fitted with dual controls)
- Capacity: three
- Length: 32 ft 9 in (9.98 m)
- Wingspan: 46 ft 0 in (14.02 m)
- Wing chord: 90 in (2.29 m)
- Wing dihedral: 1° 30'
- Height: 11 ft 3 in (3.43 m)
- Wing area: 310 sq ft (29 m^{2})
- Airfoil: Boeing 103
- Empty weight: 2,700 lb (1,225 kg)
- Gross weight: 4,000 lb (1,814 kg)
- Maximum load: 1,300 lb (590 kg)
- Powerplant: 1 × Pratt & Whitney R-985 Wasp Junior 9-cylinder air-cooled radial engine mounted as a pusher, 300 hp (220 kW)
- Propellers: 2-bladed metal fixed pitch propeller

Performance

- Maximum speed: 122 mph (196 km/h, 106 kn)
- Cruise speed: 99.5 mph (160.1 km/h, 86.5 kn)
- Landing speed: 55 mph (48 kn; 89 km/h)
- Range: 400 mi (640 km, 350 nmi)
- Service ceiling: 17,000 ft (5,200 m)
- Absolute ceiling: 18,500 ft (5,600 m)
- Rate of climb: 834 ft/min (4.24 m/s) initial rate of climb
- Wing loading: 12.9 lb/sq ft (63 kg/m^{2})
- Power/mass: .075 hp/lb (0.123 kW/kg)

== See also ==
- 1932 in aviation

=== Aircraft of comparable role, configuration and era ===
- FBA 310
- Savoia-Marchetti SM.80
- Saro Cutty Sark

=== Related lists ===
- List of civil aircraft
- List of experimental aircraft
- List of pusher aircraft by configuration
- List of flying boats and floatplanes
