= Aurora Mountain =

Mountain in Alberta, Canada

- Location within Alberta Location within British Columbia Location within Canada

Highest point
- Elevation: 2,790 m (9,150 ft)
- Prominence: 250 m (820 ft)
- Parent peak: Mount Byng (2940 m)
- Listing: Mountains of Alberta; Mountains of British Columbia
- Coordinates: 50°49′30″N 115°32′34″W

Geography
- Country: Canada
- Provinces: Alberta and British Columbia
- Protected area: Banff National Park
- Parent range: Blue Range
- Topo map: NTS 82J13 Mount Assiniboine

Climbing
- First ascent: 1916 Interprovincial Boundary Commission

Aurora Mountain is located in the Blue Range of the Canadian Rockies, which forms part of the Continental Divide and the provincial boundary between British Columbia and Alberta. It is named after HMS Aurora, a British Royal Navy light cruiser launched in 1913 that was transferred to the Royal Canadian Navy in 1920. The mountain was originally named Mount Aurora in 1916 by a survey party but was changed in 1957 to its current name.

== See also ==
- List of peaks on the Alberta–British Columbia border
