= Boeing Canada =

Canadian aerospace company, subsidiary of Boeing

- Type: Subsidiary
- Industry: Aerospace; Defense
- Founded: 1929; 97 years ago
- Headquarters: Winnipeg, Canada
- Products: Body to Wing Fairings, Engine Strut Fairings, and Landing Gear Doors
- Number of employees: 1,600+
- Parent: Boeing
- Website: boeing.ca

Boeing Canada is the Canadian subsidiary of Boeing, with operations in Winnipeg, MB, Richmond, BC, Montreal, QC and Ottawa, ON. Boeing employs more than 1600 people in Canada. Boeing Aircraft of Canada Limited was formed in 1929 by the American Boeing Airplane Company.

In October 2008, Boeing Canada was named one of "Canada's Top 100 Employers" by Mediacorp Canada Inc., and was featured in Maclean's newsmagazine. Later that month, Boeing Canada Technology in Winnipeg was also named one of Manitoba's Top Employers, which was announced by the Winnipeg Free Press newspaper.

== Facilities ==
Boeing operates the following main locations in Canada:

- Boeing Winnipeg (Winnipeg, MB) – a composite manufacturing plant established in 1971, and the largest aerospace composite manufacturing centre in Canada.
- Boeing Vancouver (Richmond, BC) – provider of aviation software, originally established as AeroInfo Systems in the 1990s. It is concerned with enterprise-level software development for commercial and defence customers.
  - Boeing Vancouver Labs in downtown Vancouver, opened in September 2016 as an extension to the Richmond facility, is concerned with development of Boeing AnalytX-driven software and consulting services.
- Boeing Montreal / Jeppesen Montreal (Montreal, QC) – 40 Montreal-based employees of the Boeing subsidiary Jeppesen provide crew management and logistics software for the aviation industry.
- Boeing Ottawa (Ottawa, ON) – home to Boeing Defense, Space & Security and Boeing Global Services Global Marketing in Canada, as well as a medium- to heavy-lift helicopter program office (supporting the RCAF CH-147F Chinook fleet).
- Boeing Distribution Canada – four customer service centres across Canada that distribute aircraft parts and offer repair services.

Boeing Canada also operates the following:

- C-17 field service support in Trenton, Ontario.
- Boeing Commercial Airplanes field service offices in Montreal, Quebec; Toronto, Ontario; and Calgary, Alberta
- Medium- to heavy-lift helicopter (MHLH) field service support (CH-147F Chinook) in Petawawa, Ontario
- MHLH parts warehouse in Renfrew, Ontario.

== Former Boeing holdings in Canada ==
The Boeing Company has been producing aircraft in Canada since the 1930s:

- Boeing Aircraft of Canada was formed on the outskirts of Vancouver in 1939, where it built four Boeing C-204 Thunderbird biplane flying boats with detail changes from the US variants, four single-engine Boeing 40H-4 landplane transports, and one of the locally developed Boeing-Canada A-213 Totem monoplane flying boat. Beginning in 1939 they built 17 Blackburn Sharks under licence for the Royal Canadian Air Force (RCAF), before starting on 240 Consolidated Catalina I flying boats for Royal Air Force (RAF) and RCAF patrol bomber squadrons. 67 Catalina VIs were also built and supplied to the RAF and Royal Australian Air Force. The plant was located at Sea Island, to the southeast of the Vancouver International Airport South Terminal. A wartime housing development built nearby was named Burkeville after for former Boeing-Canada President Stanley Burke.
- Boeing Vertol Helicopters, Arnprior Division, from 1954 to 2005 was a repair and overhaul facility for Boeing Helicopters used by the Canadian Forces and commercial operators. It was a Department of National Defence facility originally purchased by Vertol Helicopters prior to merging with Boeing. The site is now home to Arnprior Aerospace, formed from divesting from Boeing in 2005. This facility closed in 2024.
- de Havilland Canada at Downsview, Ontario, from 1985 to 1992. Sold to Bombardier (Dash 7 and Dash 8) and subsequently sold again to Viking Air's Longview Aviation to continue production of Bombardier Dash 8 under the name De Havilland Aircraft of Canada. Facility sold with Longview moving production to Alberta.
- Boeing Toronto, from 1997 to 2005, was a manufacturer of Boeing 717 wings, Delta rocket parts, the C-17 transport and the 737 airliner. This was a former McDonnell-Douglas Canada location which had been used by them from 1967 to 1997 which was absorbed by Boeing in 1997. KC-10 and MD-11 aircraft wings and related components, MD-80 wings, empennage and cabin floors, and McDonnell Douglas F/A-18 Hornet and CF-18 side panels and pylons were made there at that time. This was the Malton facility adjacent to Toronto Pearson International Airport that before McDonnell-Douglas it had been the Avro Canada plant where the Avro CF-105 Arrow was built. The plant was closed in 2005 after Boeing ended production of 717 and most of the buildings have since been torn down. TransAlta Corporation co-generation plant built in 1992 remained after Boeing plant demolished but it was finally demolished after 2019 following impact assessment.

== See also ==
- COM DEV International
- CMC Electronics
- Héroux-Devtek
- MacDonald, Dettwiler and Associates
- Spar Aerospace
