= White Man Pass =

Mountain pass in British Columbia, Canada

- Location within British Columbia Location within Canada
- Elevation: 2,199 meters (7,215 ft)

Third Approach
- Location: East Kootenay, British Columbia, Canada
- Range: Canadian Rockies
- Coordinates: 50°46′58″N 115°30′08″W
- Topo map: NTS 82J13 Mount Assiniboine

White Man Pass is a mountain pass in the Canadian Rockies of British Columbia, Canada. It lies between Mount Currie and White Man Mountain on the Alberta-British Columbia border, at an elevation of 2,199 meters above the sea level.

The first recorded venture through White Man Pass made by people of European descent was in 1801, when explorer Duncan McGillivray and David Thompson cross the Rockies through it. The pass was used by James Sinclair to lead settlers into the Oregon Territory in 1841.
