= Marvel Peak =

Mountain in Alberta, Canada

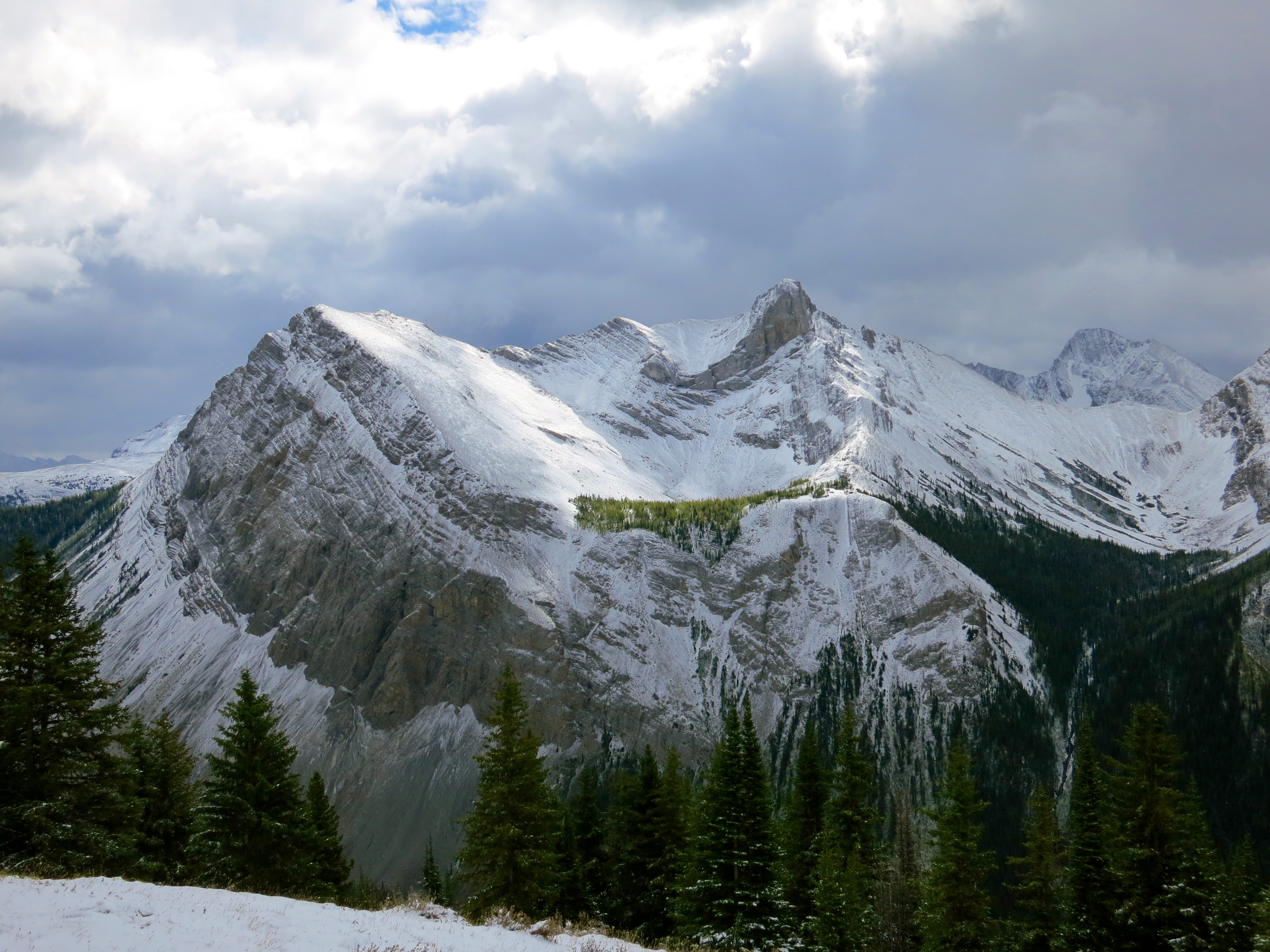
- Marvel Peak seen from Wonder Pass area

Highest point
- Elevation: 2,650 m (8,690 ft) (Note: Other sources state 2708 m and 2713 m.)
- Prominence: 430 m (1,410 ft)
- Parent peak: Mount Byng (2940 m)
- Listing: Mountains of Alberta
- Coordinates: 50°51′35″N 115°33′05″W

Geography
- Location within Alberta Location within Canada
- Interactive map of Marvel Peak
- Country: Canada
- Province: Alberta
- Protected area: Banff National Park
- Parent range: Blue Range; Canadian Rockies
- Topo map: NTS 82J13 Mount Assiniboine

Geology
- Rock age: Cambrian
- Rock type: Sedimentary rock

Marvel Peak is a 2,650-metre (8,690-foot) mountain summit located in the southern tip of Banff National Park, in the Canadian Rockies of Alberta, Canada. Marvel Peak is situated in the Blue Range, three kilometres from the Continental Divide, and not visible from any road. Marvel Peak's nearest higher peak is Wonder Peak, 3.29 km (2.04 mi) to the north-northwest.

== History ==
Like so many of the mountains in and around Kananaskis Country, Marvel Peak received its name from the persons and ships involved in the 1916 Battle of Jutland, the only major sea battle of the First World War. It was named in 1917 by the Interprovincial Boundary Survey after HMS Marvel which was a destroyer involved in the Battle of Jutland. An alternate view is the name is simply descriptive, similar to Wonder Peak to the north. The mountain's toponym was officially adopted in 1934 by the Geographical Names Board of Canada.

== Geology ==
Like other mountains in Banff Park, Marvel Peak is composed of sedimentary rock laid down during the Precambrian to Jurassic periods. Formed in shallow seas, this sedimentary rock was pushed east and over the top of younger rock during the Laramide orogeny.

== Climate ==
Based on the Köppen climate classification, Marvel Peak is located in a subarctic climate zone with cold, snowy winters, and mild summers. Winter temperatures can drop below −20 °C (−4 °F) with wind chill factors below −30 °C (−22 °F). In terms of favorable weather, June through September are the best months to climb. Precipitation runoff from the mountain drains into Owl Creek and Marvel Creek, which find their way into Spray Lakes Reservoir.

== Gallery ==
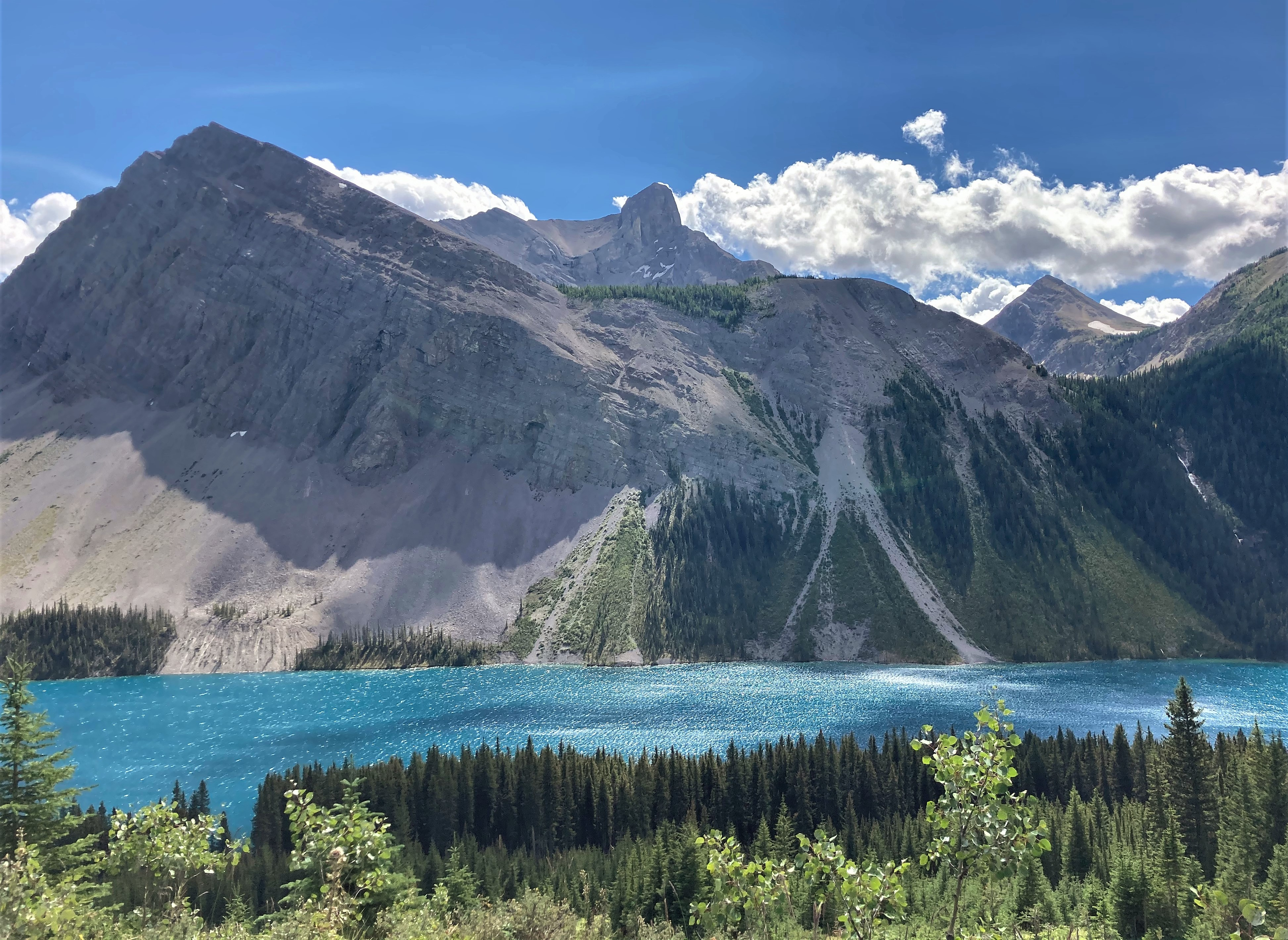
North aspect of Marvel Peak above Marvel Lake

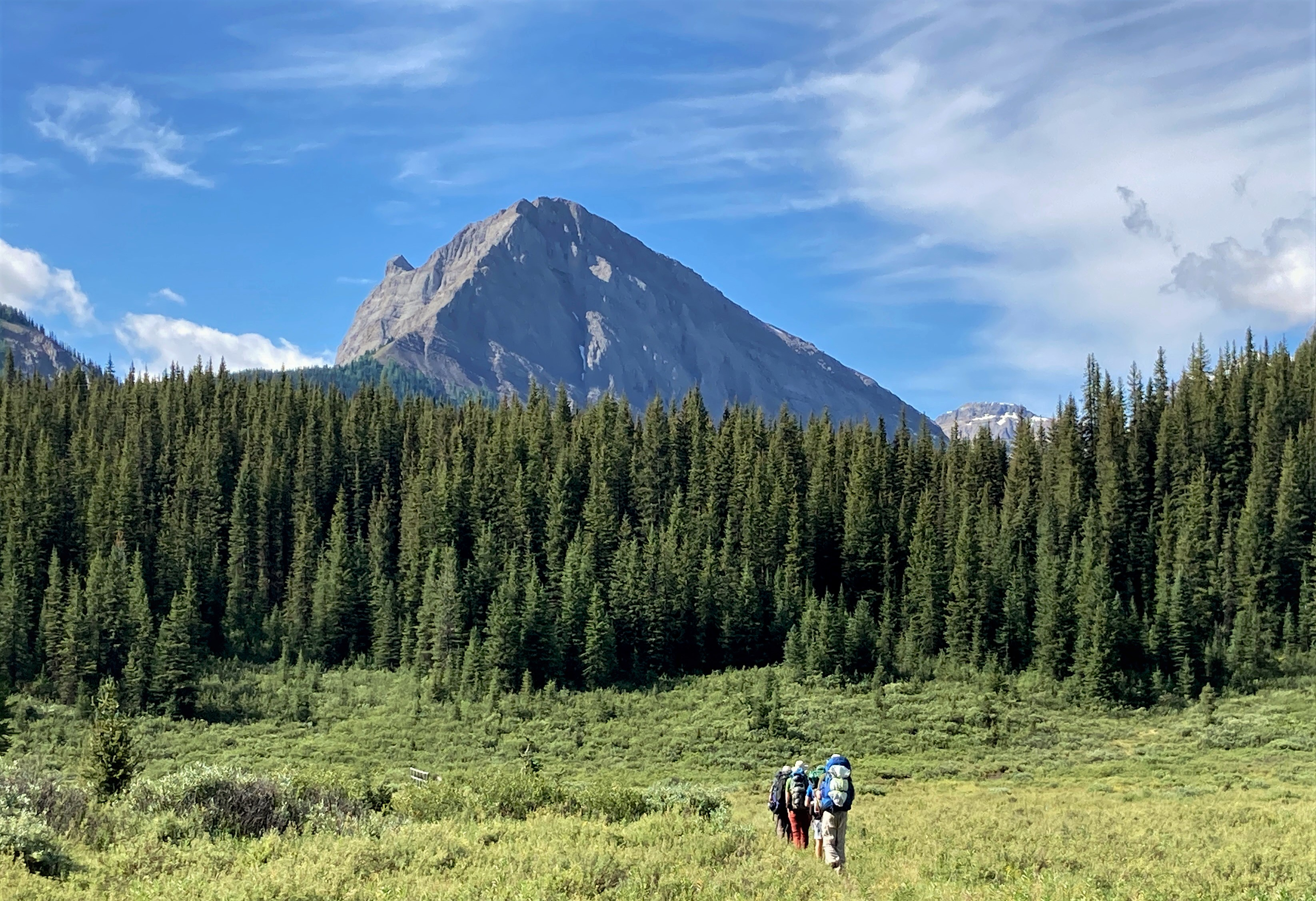
Marvel Peak seen from northeast.

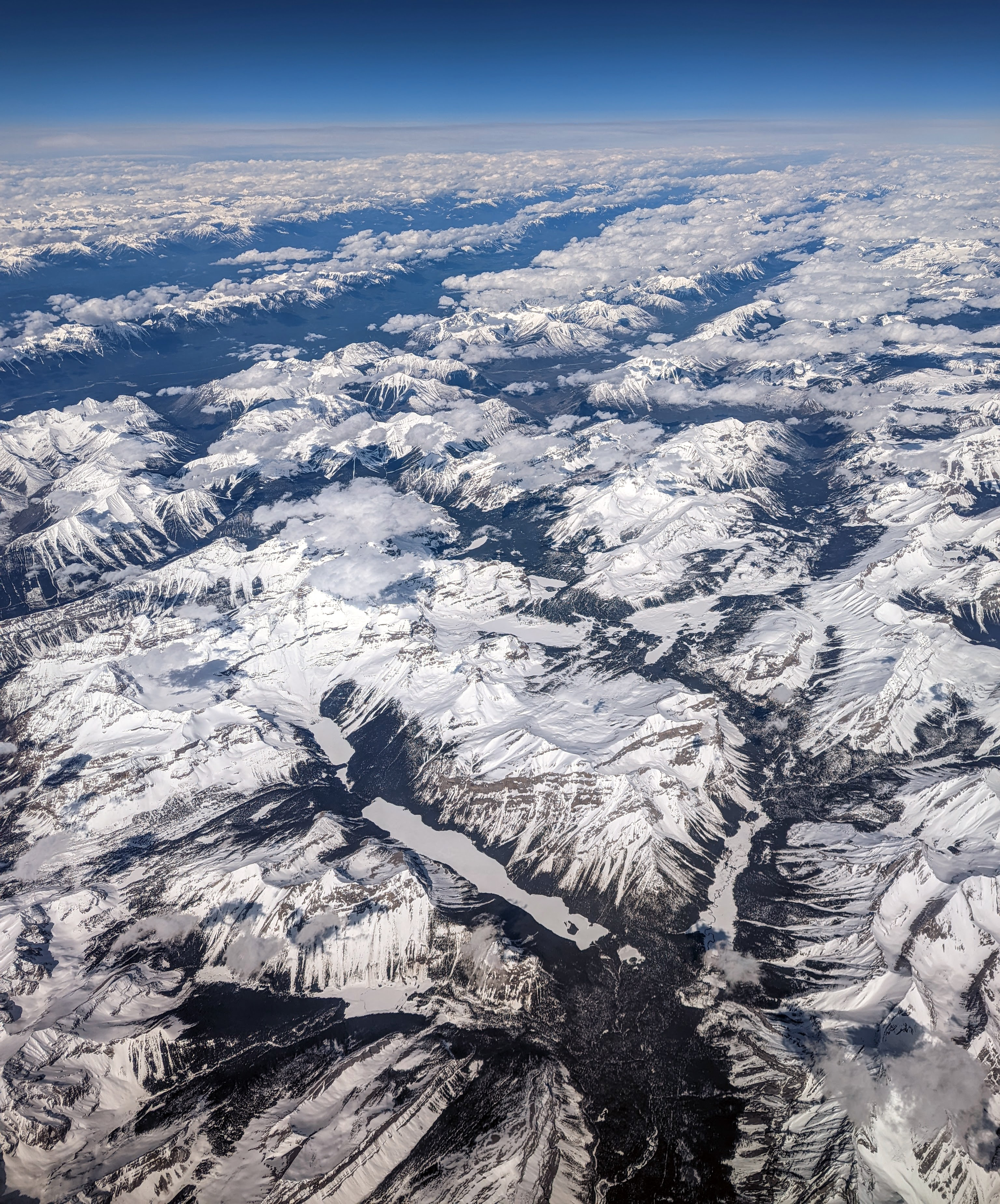
Marvel Peak (left foreground) is near Marvel Lake (the long one) and Lake Gloria (behind).

== See also ==
- Geography of Alberta
