= Ship management =

Management team for ships

Ship management is the activity of managing marine vessels. The vessels under management could be owned by a sister concern of the ship management company or by independent vessel owners. A vessel owning company that generally has several vessels in its fleet, entrusts the fleet management to a single or multiple ship management companies. Ship management is often entrusted to third parties due to the various hassles that are involved in managing a ship. For instance, ships could be considered as large factories that travel across seas under various weather conditions for several days at a stretch. These vessels are equipped with several types of machinery that require appropriate maintenance and the associated spares on board. In the scenario of a vessel lacking adequate maintenance, this could lead to the breakdown of the equipment in the middle of a voyage at sea. A breakdown could be an expensive affair. A second scenario would be – a vessel is continuously on the move or under some sort of activity and hence requires a competent crew. The documents of the crew need to comply with international regulations, their transportation to and from the vessel must be arranged for, their competencies must align with the requirement of the vessel and must complement the skillsets of the existing onboard crew. Hence several parameters must be considered which is a tedious job.

In order to ensure such scenarios are considered for and to provide adequate attention to the vessels, ship owners outsource the management. Several management companies provide the owner with a crew on board. When the ship comes out of the shipyard (where the ship is built) the management company takes it over providing technical management to the owner. Most Management companies also offer other services like inspection prior to purchase, supervision during building, crew management and supply and ship lay-up solutions.

Major locations where third party ship management activities are carried out from include Limassol (Cyprus), Singapore, Hong Kong and Malta.

In order to help with the management of these vessels, several operators use maritime software such as a planned maintenance system, maritime procurement system or a safety management system to streamline processes and ensure efficiency.

== Marine classification ==
In the practice of professional ship management, ship managers interact with ship classification societies (often called "Class") through a structured framework of regulatory compliance, operational oversight, and technical consultancy. While classification societies are independent, non-governmental bodies that establish and verify technical standards for the design, construction, and life-cycle maintenance of ships, the ship manager is responsible for day-to-day maintenance, seaworthiness, and adherence to international maritime law.

== See also ==
- List of freight ship companies
- Crew management
- Maritime history
- Technical management
- Shipping companies
- Shipping markets
- Glossary of nautical terms (disambiguation)
