= Mount Turner (Alberta) =

Mountain in Banff NP, Alberta, Canada

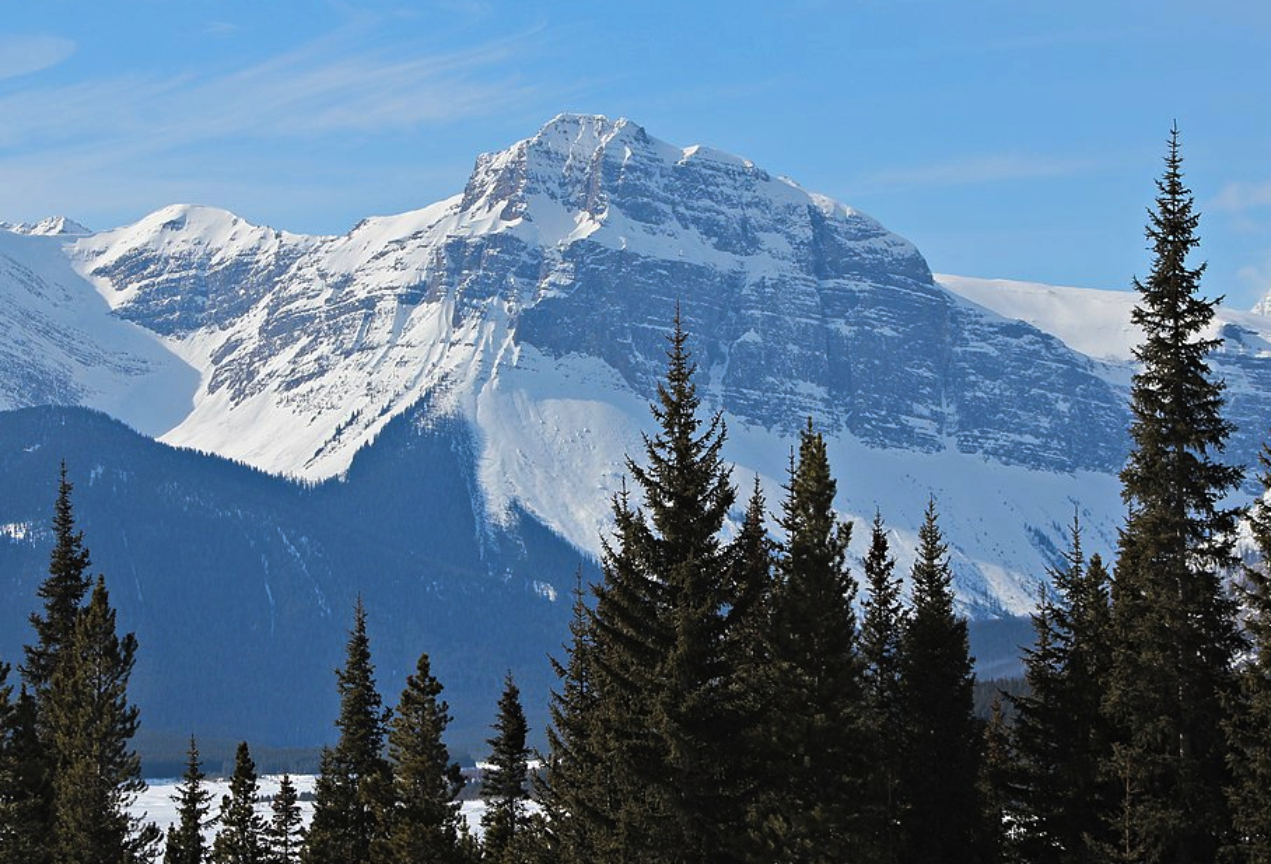
- Mount Turner seen from Spray Lakes

Highest point
- Elevation: 2,806 m (9,206 ft)
- Prominence: 389 m (1,276 ft)
- Parent peak: Mount Byng (2940 m)
- Listing: Mountains of Alberta
- Coordinates: 50°51′16″N 115°28′39″W

Geography
- Location within Alberta Location within Canada
- Interactive map of Mount Turner
- Country: Canada
- Province: Alberta
- Parent range: Blue Range; Canadian Rockies
- Topo map: NTS 82J14 Spray Lakes Reservoir

Geology
- Rock age: Cambrian
- Rock type: Sedimentary rock

Climbing
- Easiest route: Scramble

Mount Turner is a 2,806-metre (9,206-foot) mountain summit located in the upper Spray River Valley of southern Banff National Park, in the Canadian Rockies of Alberta, Canada. Mount Turner is not visible from any road in Banff Park, however, it can be seen from Alberta Highway 742, also known as the Smith-Dorrien/Spray Trail in Kananaskis Country. Mount Turner's nearest higher peak is Cone Mountain, 2.91 km (1.81 mi) to the north.

== History ==
Mount Turner was named in 1918 for Sir Richard Turner (1871–1961), a Lieutenant-general in the Canadian Army who served during the Second Boer War and the First World War, and was a recipient of the Victoria Cross. Earlier in his career, he served in the Royal Canadian Dragoons with Sir Edward Morrison in 1900. Not coincidentally, Mount Morrison is situated two kilometres south of Mount Turner.

The mountain's name was officially adopted in 1924 by the Geographical Names Board of Canada.

== Geology ==
Mount Turner is composed of sedimentary rock laid down during the Precambrian to Jurassic periods and was later pushed east and over the top of younger rock during the Laramide orogeny.

== Climate ==
Based on the Köppen climate classification, Mount Turner is located in a subarctic climate zone with cold, snowy winters, and mild summers. Temperatures can drop below −20 °C with wind chill factors below −30 °C. In terms of favorable weather, June through September are the best months to climb. Precipitation runoff from the mountain drains into Owl Creek and Bryant Creek, which empty into Spray Lakes Reservoir.

== Gallery ==
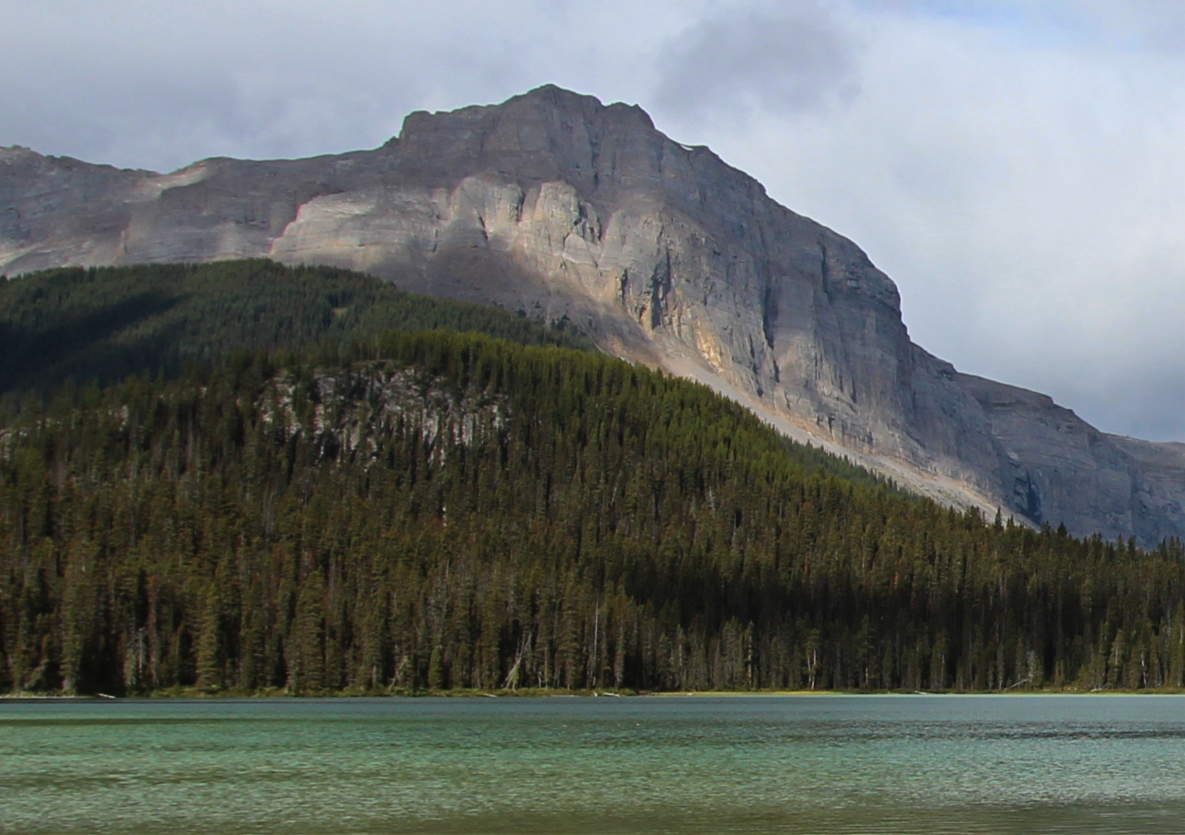
Mount Turner seen from Watridge Lake

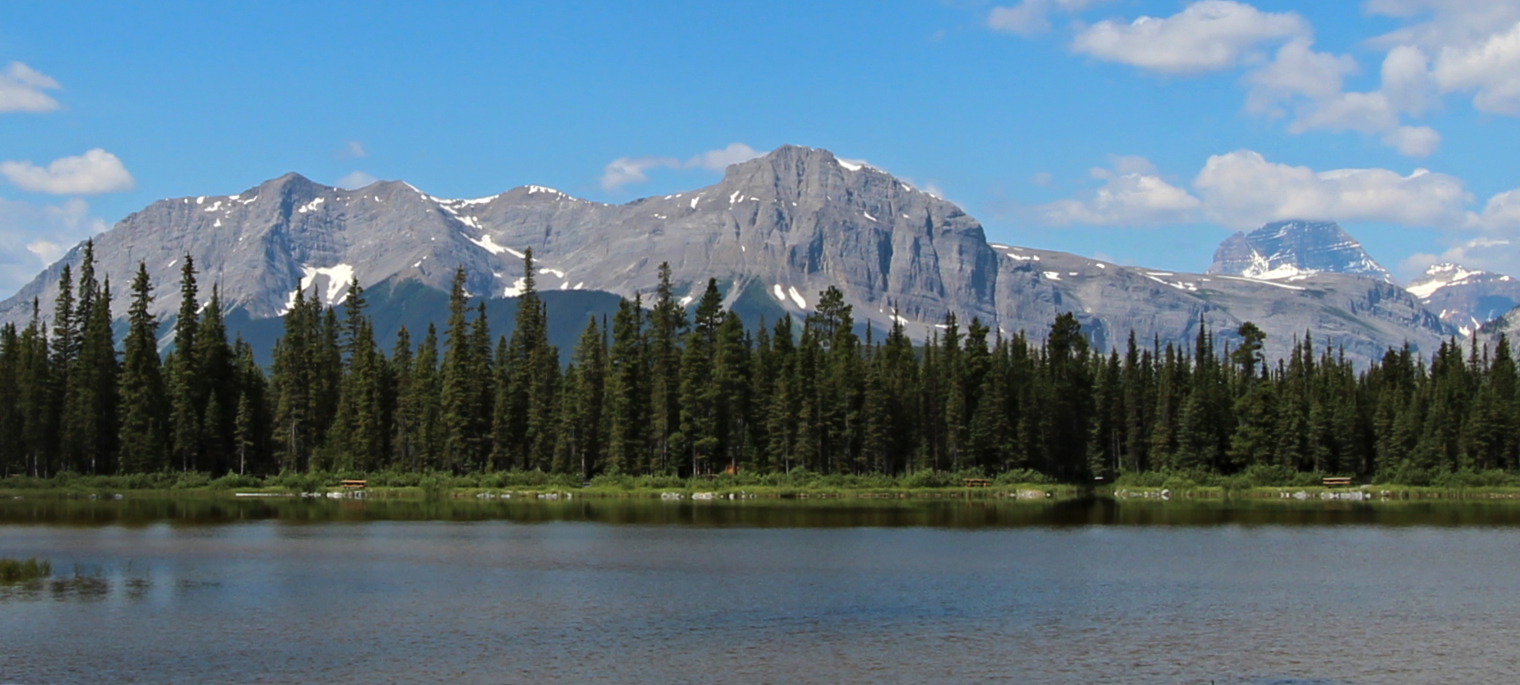
Mt. Turner centered, with Mt. Assiniboine to right, and Mt. Morrison left

== See also ==
- Geography of Alberta
