= Red Man Mountain =

Mountain on Alberta/British Columbia boundary in Canada

- Location within Alberta Location within British Columbia Location within Canada

Highest point
- Elevation: 2,891 m (9,485 ft) (Note: Other sources state 2905 m.)
- Prominence: 551 m (1,808 ft)
- Listing: Mountains of Alberta; Mountains of British Columbia
- Coordinates: 50°47′18″N 115°31′59″W

Geography
- Country: Canada
- Provinces: Alberta and British Columbia
- Protected area: Banff National Park
- Parent range: Blue Range
- Topo map: NTS 82J13 Mount Assiniboine

Climbing
- First ascent: 1916 Interpovincial Boundary Commission

Red Man Mountain was named in 1917 because of the red color of the rock and in contrast to nearby White Man Mountain. It is located in the Blue Range of the Canadian Rockies and straddles the Continental Divide marking the Alberta-British Columbia border.

== See also ==
- List of peaks on the Alberta–British Columbia border
