= Don Morrison (mountaineer) =

British climber and mountaineer (1929–1977)

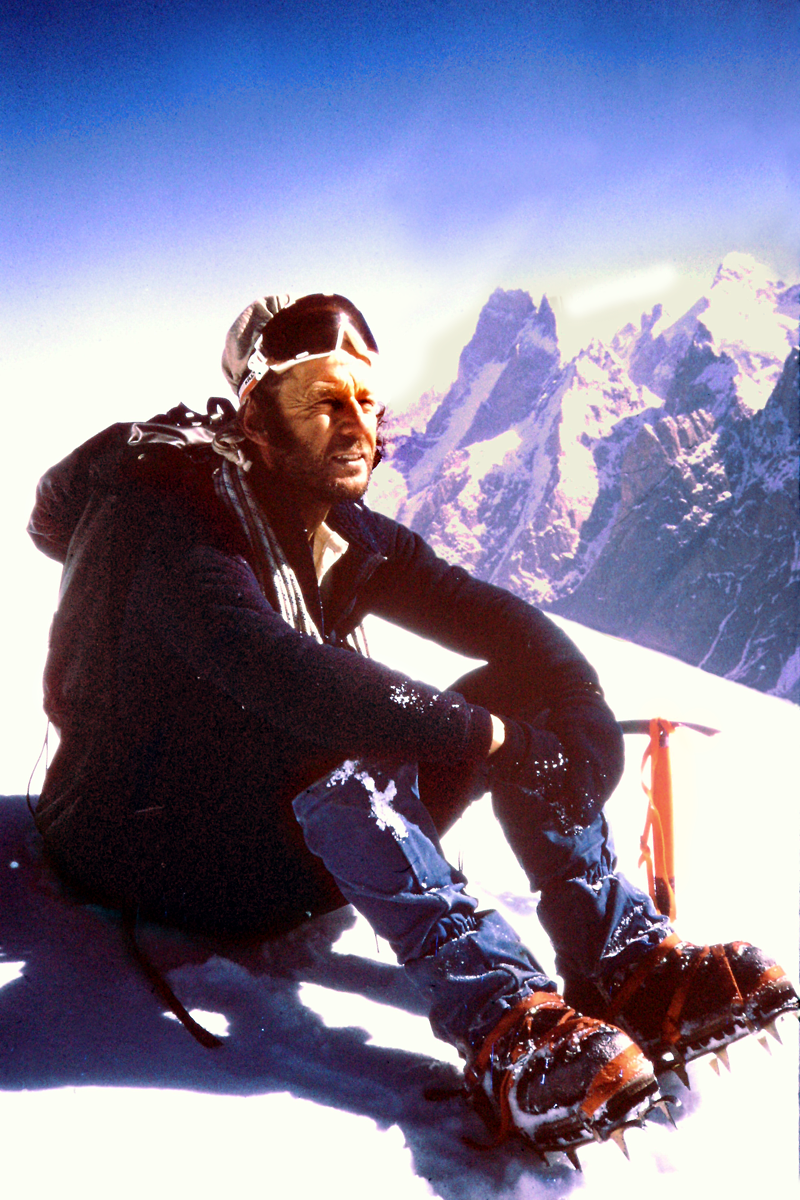
- Don Morrison during the first ascent of Pamshe in the Himalayas in 1975
- Born: Donald Kenneth Morrison; 19 March 1929; Bromley, United Kingdom
- Died: 21 June 1977 (aged 48); Karakoram, Himalayas, Pakistan
- Known for: Pioneering climbs, Alpine style climbing, climbing leadership
- Awards: ACC’s Silver Rope for Excellence in Leadership and Technical Ability (1958)

Donald Kenneth Morrison (19 March 1929 – 21 June 1977) was a British climber and mountaineer. Morrison first became known as a pioneer rock climber in Canada, then in England's Peak District and he led three expeditions to the Himalayas. He died in 1977 leading an attempt on Latok II peak in the Karakoram.

== Early years ==
Morrison was born in Bromley, Kent and his family later moved to Sheffield, Yorkshire. While on military service with the RAF Morrison first developed his climbing skills, during travels in the Middle East, including Kurdistan, Turkey and Iraq.

== Climbing career ==
=== Canada ===
During the 1950s Morrison lived in North America. Joining the Alpine Club of Canada (ACC) in 1955, he climbed and guided extensively in the Rockies around Banff and Lake Louise. Among 14 first ascents made in the Rockies, Bugaboos, and Coast Range during this period were Mount Morrison (Alberta, 1955)], and Mount Jerram (1957) with Canadian climber, Jim Tarrant. In 1955 Morrison and Tarrant made the first ascent of the NE Buttress of Mount Odaray - deemed "one of the most formidable climbs in the country with Morrison leading the route:

Chic Scott wrote in Pushing the Limits (2000):

Don Morrison was from Sheffield and had learned his climbing in the bold British tradition. In July of 1955 he persuaded Calgary climber Jim Tarrant to join him in a new route up the 1000 metre-high northeast buttress of Mount Odaray. Their route worked its way up what was described as "...endlessly varied horizontally bedded layers. At its best, vertical handjams in the thicker solid layers, and at its worst, like climbing up china cabinets with the doors open." As they rose higher, the ledges became smaller and smaller, and the belays more and more tenuous. Several overhangs provided the most difficult moves of the climb, and at times it was necessary for Morrison to leave his pack behind, then pull it up afterwards. After eleven hours of continuously difficult climbing they reached the summit. Morrison had led throughout and had never placed a single piton. Although the climbing is still graded 5.7, the climbers modestly described their route only as a "...highly interesting and entertaining climb."

In 1958 Morrison was awarded the Alpine Club of Canada's Silver Rope for Excellence in Leadership and Technical Ability.

=== The Peak District ===
After returning to Sheffield, Morrison became a prominent member of the Climbers' Club (CC), Peak Climbing Club and Castle Mountaineering Club. Among his numerous first ascents on Peak District edges were "Blenheim", "Beaufort" (Gardom's Edge), "High Heaven" (Yarncliffe) "S.A.E", "Nova", "Red Wall" Lawrencefield Quarry, Don’s Mantle, Morrison’s Redoubt (Stanage Edge) and Robert. He worked alongside CC colleagues Eric Byne, Pete Marks and Paul Nunn on the first Peak District climbing guides. Actively involved with the development of outdoor education in the Peak District, he was an Assessor for the Duke of Edinburgh's Award and an instructor for the Outward Bound programs at White Hall. Morrison also ran a mountain sports business and became the sponsor of the annual fell race held in Derbyshire now known as the Don Morrison Memorial Edale Skyline Race.

=== 1967 Yukon centennial alpine expedition ===
In July 1967, Morrison and fellow British climber, Lord John Hunt represented Britain in the Alpine Club of Canada's Centennial Expedition to the Yukon, with Morrison and Hunt among the 11 climbers chosen to be rope leaders. Morrison and his team made the first ascent of Mount Promenade (9,200 ft.), north of the Steele Glacier.

=== The 1971 Yorkshire Himalayan expedition ===
Just weeks before departing on a 1971 expedition to climb Gasherbrum III, then the highest unclimbed mountain in the world, Morrison learned from the Pakistan Government that permission to climb the mountain at that time was impossible, but he had instead been granted permission to climb Baintha Brakk (23,090 ft.), another unattempted peak rising above the North side of the Biafo Glacier, in the Himalayas’ Karakoram range. One of the Karakoram's steepest, craggiest mountains, this formidable peak was already widely known as the ‘Ogre’, after the accounts of British explorer Martin Conway.

Morrison's eight-man team also comprised: John Gregory, Gordon Hibberd, Ullah (Bill) Hidayat (Deputy Leader and team doctor), David Marshall, John Rousseau, Clive Rowland and Trevor Wright. As ongoing war and political conflict had blocked access to this part of the Himalayas for over a decade, Morrison and his team would be the first mountaineers since the 1950s to enter this area with some of the world's highest and most challenging unclimbed mountains. The expedition had the patronage of Lord John Hunt, and the support of the Royal Geographical Society and Mount Everest Foundation.

Departing 1 May 1971, the team travelled overland from Sheffield to Pakistan. Their flight to Skardu was followed by a further 100 miles by jeep and on foot to Askole, before they reached their first camp at the Biafo Glacier.

While the team's reconnoitres of the Ogre found a feasible route, deteriorating monsoon weather and porter strikes meant they were unable to get above 17,500 ft. Before departing the area, they made the first ascent of a nearby peak, Mount Razaqi (18,320 ft.).

=== The 1975 Yorkshire Karakoram expedition ===
After gaining permission to lead a second attempt on the Ogre, Morrison mounted an all-British team consisting of Pat Fearnehough, Ted Howard, Peter Jennings, Alan Burke and Dr John Minors. This time the expedition's porters went on strike just after being issued boots and goggles at the snow line of the Biafo Glacier. On limited resources, Morrison and team paid off the porters, extracting an agreement they would return for the walk out. The team then continued their advance up the glacier, but it became clear that carrying their loads of equipment to Base Camp would not be completed in time to continue their attempt on the Ogre.

Establishing an alternative Base Camp at Ho Bluk, the team instead made two alpine style first ascents: ‘PaJo’ (19,000 ft.) by Fearnehough and Minors, and ‘PamShe’ (c. 21,000 ft.) by Morrison and Howard.

=== Latok II, 1977 ===
Morrison planned to lead his third expedition to the Ogre in 1977, but learned the Pakistan government had already granted permission to Doug Scott. While Morrison was deeply disappointed, he accepted the alternative peak offered by the Pakistan government, and in May 1977, departed with his expedition members Pat Fearnehough, Pat Green, Paul Nunn and Tony Riley for an attempt on the then unconquered Latok II (23,300 ft) lying just to the east of the Ogre.

The first expedition into the Karakoram that year, the team established their Base Camp on 1 June near the Uzun Brakk glacier. Further camps were established below the slopes leading to the west ridge col and, after a delay by bad weather, by 20 June upon the west and east ends of that col. Climbing in separate parties over several days, the team climbed several sections above the col, reaching their highest point on 25 June 1977, reported as being about 2,000 feet below the summit.

While making a night-time return to Advance Base with Riley, after loading up with supplies and equipment, Morrison fell through a snow bridge into a deep crevasse on the Latok glacier. Despite repeated attempts, it proved impossible to reach him.

Before leaving the Karakoram to begin their return to the UK, the team built a memorial to Morrison; situated at the branching of the Uzan Brakk and Latok glaciers. Morrison's rock cairn stands opposite PamShe peak, quote, "commanding a magnificent view of the South West face of Latok II and the South face of the Ogre."

== Bibliography ==
- Byne, Eric (1966). High Peak. United Kingdom: Martin Secker & Warburg Ltd. pp. 201–202. ISBN 978-0436079009.
- Scott, Chic (2000). Pushing the limits: the story of Canadian mountaineering. Rocky Mountain Books Ltd. pp. 169–170. ISBN 0-921102-59-3 – via Internet Archive.
- Byne, Eric (1970). The Sheffield-Stanage Area (Rock Climbs in The Peak Series) Volume One. Climbers' Club for The Peak Committee of the British Moutaineering Council. pp. 169–170. ASIN B001Q9ACI4.
- McDonald, Pete (1970). The Story of Whitehall Centre. McDonald, Dunedin, 9010, New Zealand. p. 250. ISBN 9780473425272 – via Google Books.
- Nunn, Paul J. (1974). The Kinder Guide. British Mountaineering Council. ISBN 978-0903908108.
