= Mount Morrison (Alberta) =

Mountain in Banff NP, Alberta, Canada

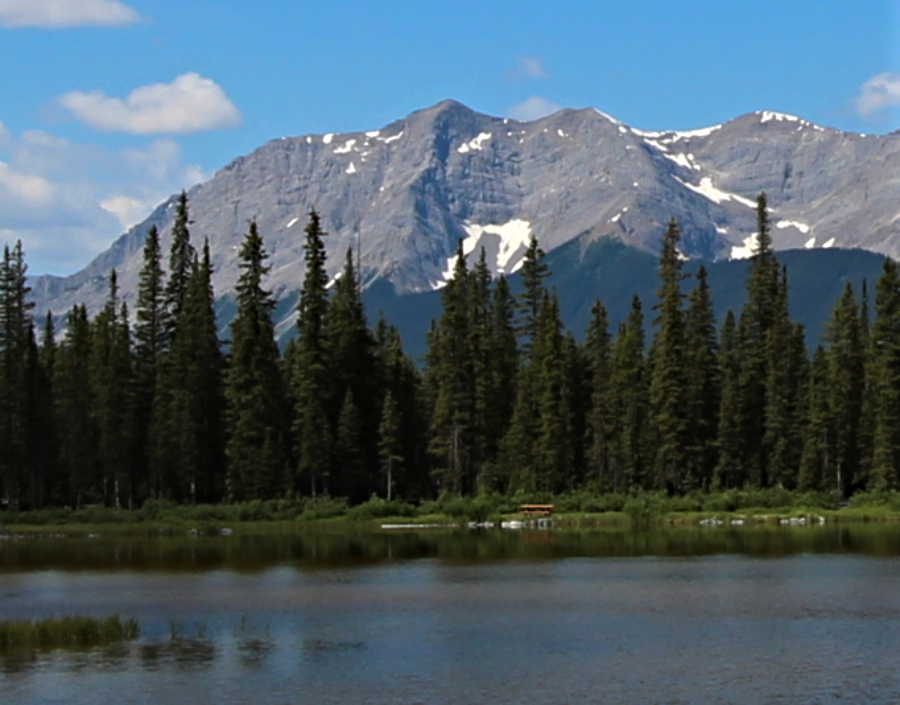
- Mount Morrison seen from Buller Pond

Highest point
- Elevation: 2,765 m (9,072 ft)
- Prominence: 133 m (436 ft)
- Parent peak: Mount Turner (2806 m)
- Listing: Mountains of Alberta
- Coordinates: 50°50′16″N 115°28′45″W

Geography
- Location within Alberta Location within Canada
- Interactive map of Mount Morrison
- Country: Canada
- Province: Alberta
- Protected area: Banff National Park
- Parent range: Blue Range; Canadian Rockies
- Topo map: NTS 82J14 Spray Lakes Reservoir

Geology
- Rock age: Cambrian
- Rock type: Sedimentary rock

Climbing
- First ascent: 1955 Don K. Morrison
- Easiest route: Scramble

Mount Morrison is a 2,765-metre (9,072-foot) mountain summit located in the upper Spray River Valley of southern Banff National Park, in the Canadian Rockies of Alberta, Canada. Mount Morrison in not visible from any road in Banff Park, however, it can be seen from Alberta Highway 742, also known as the Smith-Dorrien/Spray Trail in Kananaskis Country. Mount Morrison's nearest higher peak is Mount Turner, 1.8 km (1.1 mi) to the north.

== History ==
Mount Morrison was named in 1918 for Sir Edward Morrison (1867–1925), Major General in the Canadian Army during the First World War. Earlier in his career, he served in the Royal Canadian Dragoons with Sir Richard Turner in 1900 during the Second Boer War under the command of Brigadier-General Horace Smith-Dorrien. Not coincidentally, Mount Morrison is situated two kilometres south of Mount Turner.

The mountain's toponym was officially adopted in 1924 by the Geographical Names Board of Canada.

The first ascent of the peak was made in 1955 by Don Morrison.

== Geology ==
Like most of the mountains in Banff Park, Mount Morrison is composed of sedimentary rock laid down during the Precambrian to Jurassic periods. Formed in shallow seas, this sedimentary rock was pushed east and over the top of younger rock during the Laramide orogeny.

== Climate ==
Based on the Köppen climate classification, Mount Morrison is located in a subarctic climate with cold, snowy winters, and mild summers. Temperatures can drop below −20 °C with wind chill factors below −30 °C. In terms of favorable weather, June through September are the best months to climb. Precipitation runoff from the mountain drains into Currie Creek, which empties into Spray Lakes Reservoir via Spray River.

== Gallery ==
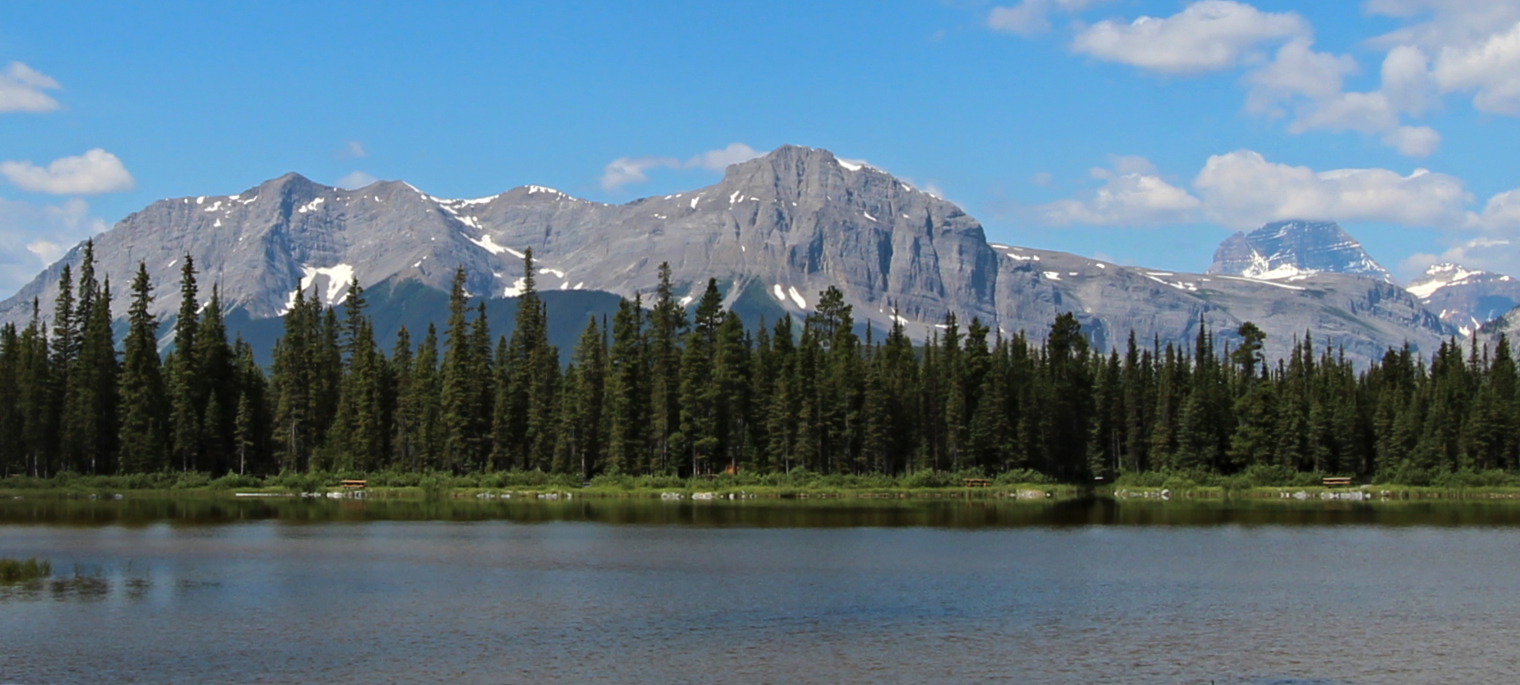
Mt. Turner centered, Mt. Morrison left, Mt. Assiniboine right

== See also ==
- Geography of Alberta
