= Mount Currie (Alberta) =

Mountain in Banff NP, Alberta, Canada

- Location within Alberta Location within Canada

Highest point
- Elevation: 2,770 m (9,090 ft) (Note: Other sources state 2810 m.)
- Prominence: 429 m (1,407 ft)
- Parent peak: Red Man Mountain (2891 m)
- Listing: Mountains of Alberta
- Coordinates: 50°48′11″N 115°29′32″W

Geography
- Country: Canada
- Province: Alberta
- Protected area: Banff National Park
- Parent range: Blue Range; Canadian Rockies
- Topo map: NTS 82J14 Spray Lakes Reservoir

Geology
- Rock age: Cambrian
- Rock type: Sedimentary rock

Climbing
- First ascent: 1916 by the Interprovincial Boundary Commission

Mount Currie is a 2,770-metre (9,090-foot) mountain summit located in the upper Spray River Valley of southern Banff National Park, in the Canadian Rockies of Alberta, Canada. Mount Currie's nearest higher peak is Red Man Mountain, 3.3 km (2.1 mi) to the southwest on the Continental Divide.

== History ==
Mount Currie was named in 1918 for General Sir Arthur William Currie (1875–1933), the first Canadian commander of the Canadian Corps and later the Canadian Army during World War I.

The mountain's name was made official in 1924 by the Geographical Names Board of Canada.

== Geology ==
Mount Currie is composed of sedimentary rock laid down during the Precambrian to Jurassic periods and was later pushed east and over the top of younger rock during the Laramide orogeny. The southeast face of the mountain displays chevron folds in the calcareous shale.

== Climate ==
Based on the Köppen climate classification, Mount Currie is located in a subarctic climate with cold, snowy winters, and mild summers. Temperatures can drop below −20 °C. with wind chill factors below −30 °C. In terms of favourable weather, June through September are the best months to climb.

Precipitation runoff from the mountain drains into Currie Creek and White Man Creek, which are both tributaries of the Spray River.

== See also ==
- Geography of Alberta
