= Crew management =

Crew management for ships, otherwise known as crewing, are the services rendered by specialised shipping companies. Crew management services are an essential part of maritime and ship management that includes the management of all the various activities handled by crew on-board vessels, as well as related shore-based administration. Major locations where crew management activities are carried out from include Limassol (Cyprus), Singapore, Hong Kong and Malta.

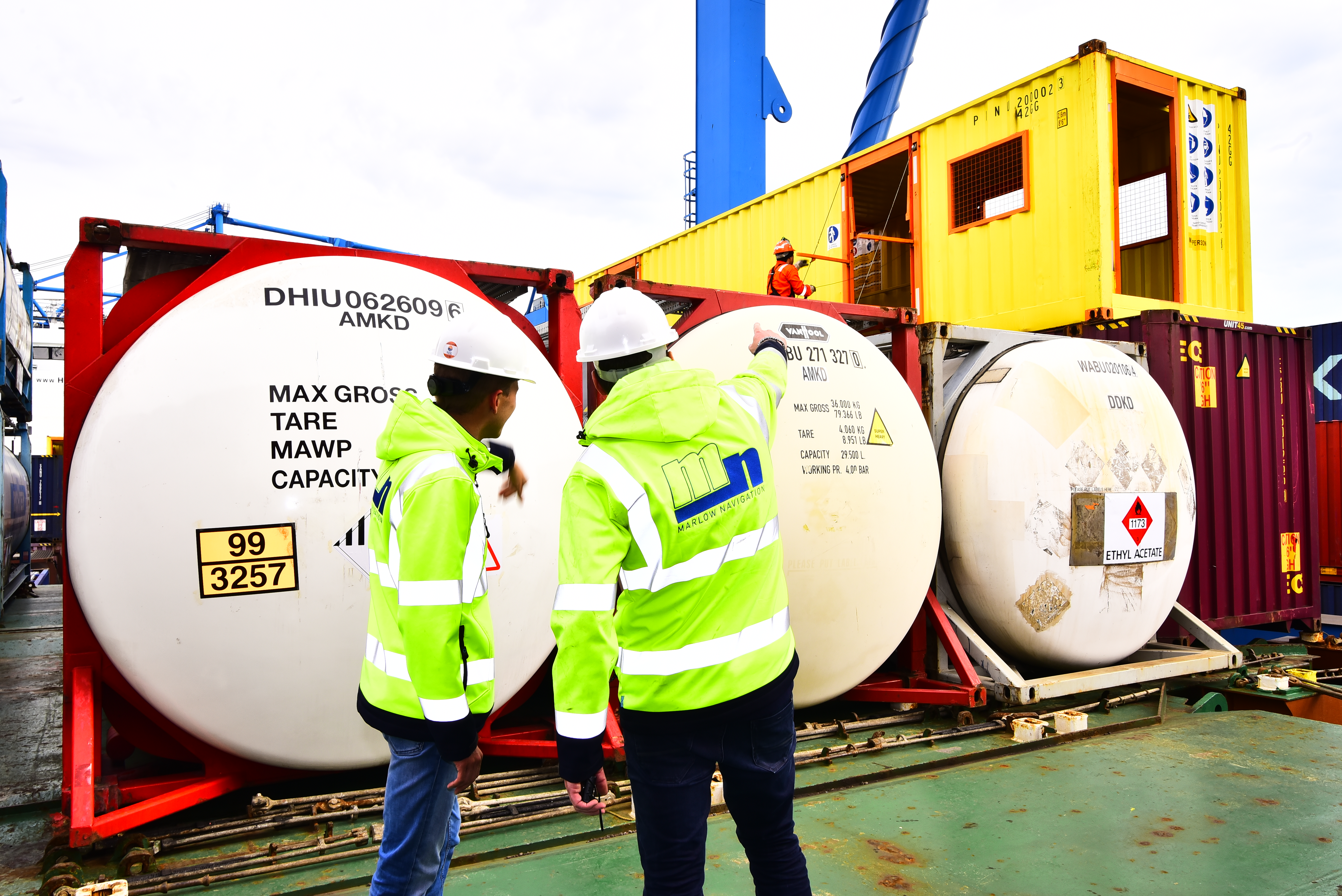
Crew management in the maritime/shipping industry - regular crew inspections

== Crew manager ==
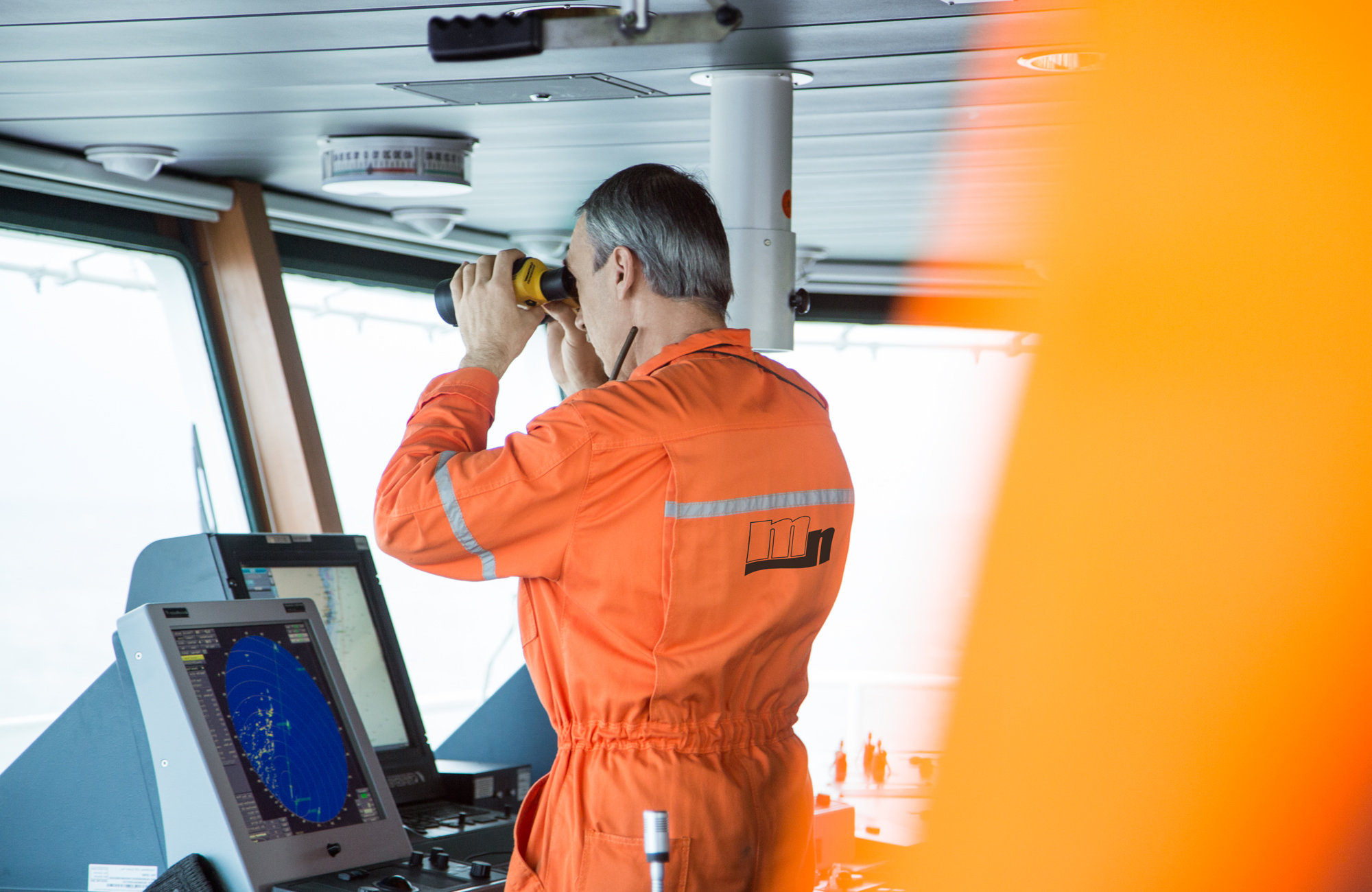
Crew management - captain at sea

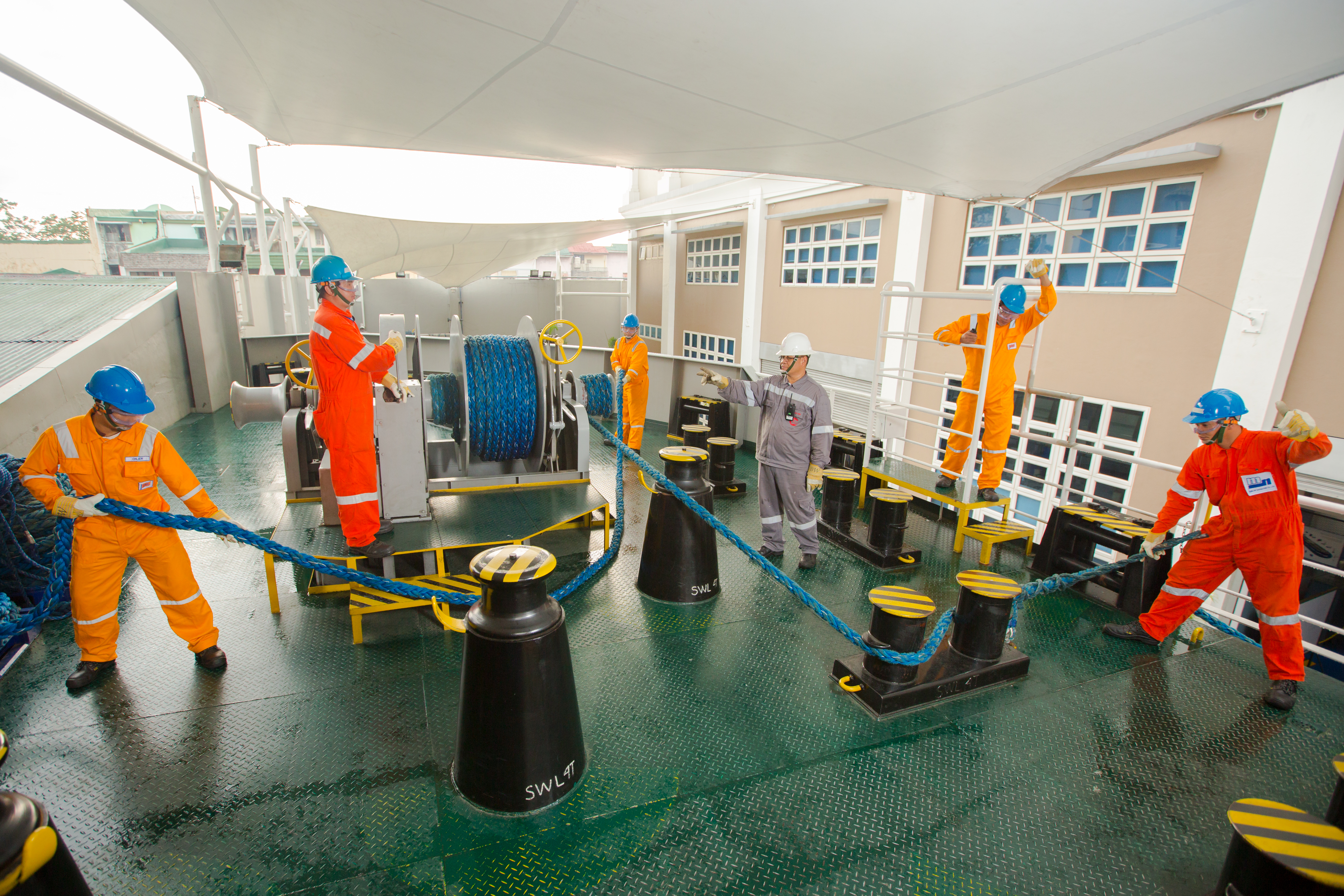
Mooring station - crew training at United Marine Training Center in Manila

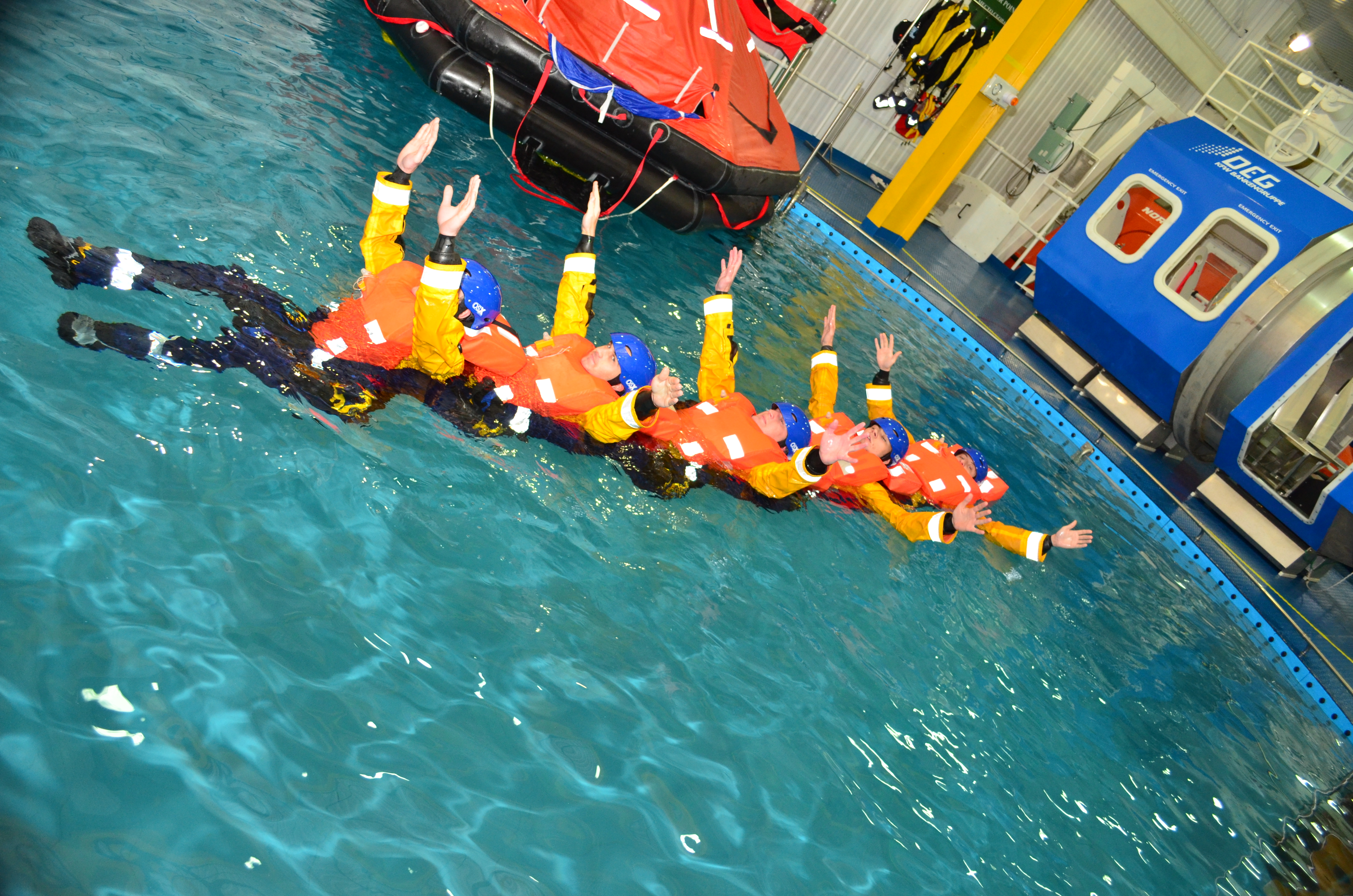
Kherson Maritime Specialized Training Centre (KMSTC) in Ukraine

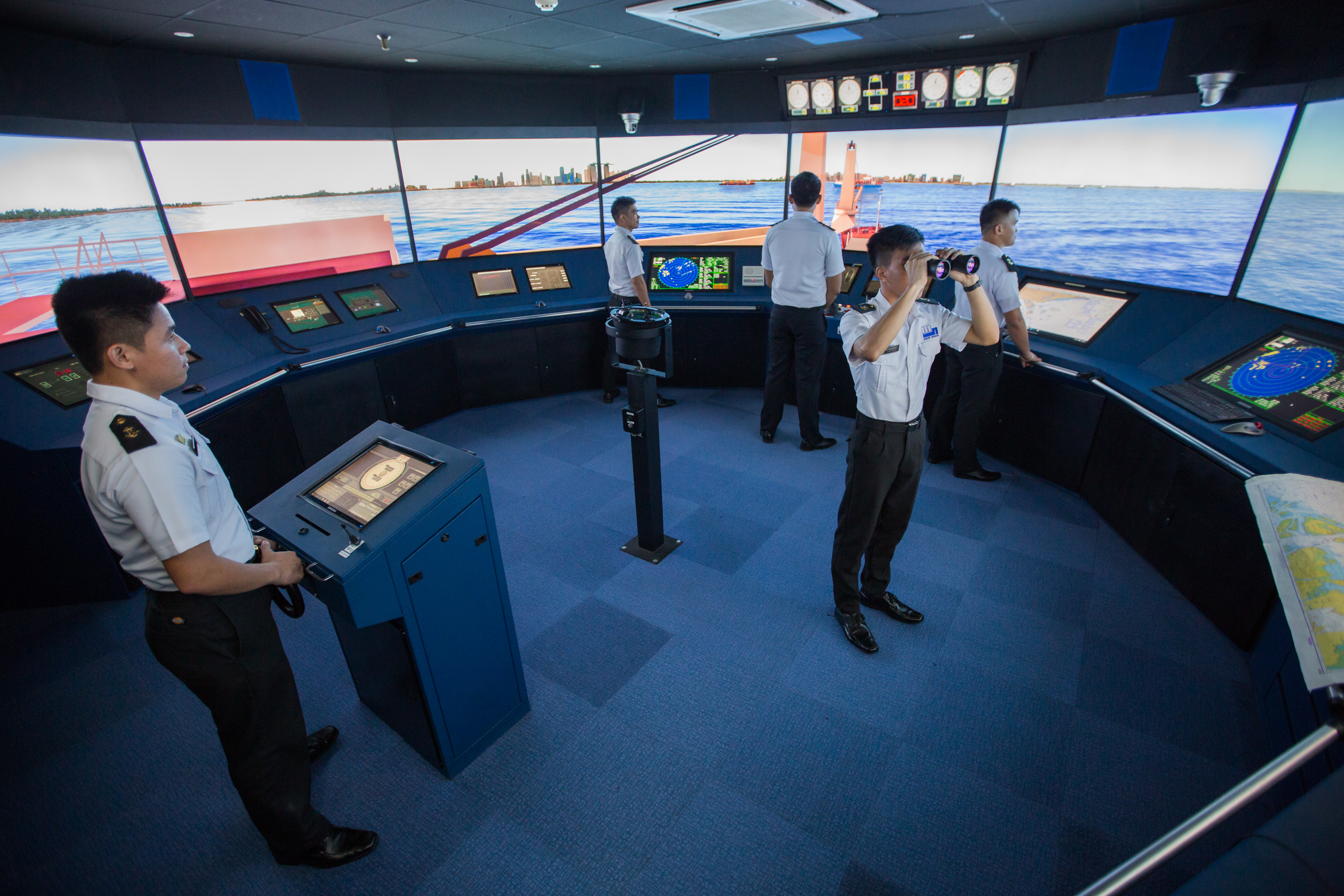
Full mission bridge simulator - crew training at UMTC in the Philippines

Organisations that provide crew management services are known as crew management companies, or crewing managers, as commissioned by ship owners, ship managers, ship operators or charterers under a crew management contract.

Crew management companies are responsible for the human resources and manning of all types of vessels, utilising their management offices, as well as a network of localised recruitment agencies based in key seafarer sourcing locations. Most commonly, these services include crew recruitment, deployment to vessel, scheduling, and regular training and development. Crew management companies are also responsible for taking care of on-going management and administrative duties of seafarers, such as payroll, travel arrangements, insurance and health schemes, overall career development, as well as their day-to-day welfare.

Specialised crewing software, commonly custom-built by crew management companies is used to manage activities and crewing-related data. This includes the scheduling of crew on- and off-board vessels, industry certifications and documentation, crew logistical aspects in travel arrangement and payroll/HR, crew training and upgrading schedules, as well as office administration tasks, such as performance assessments and statistical analyses, feedback, management and ship-owner reporting and invoicing, client online interface, and an integrated CRM.

== Source of seafarers ==
The majority of the international shipping industry's seafarer ratings are recruited from developing countries, especially the Far East and South East Asia, namely the Philippines (Filipino seamen), India and China.

The OECD countries (North America, Western Europe, Japan and others) remain an important source for officers, but growing numbers are now recruited from the Far East and Eastern Europe, with considerable numbers coming from Ukraine, Russia, Croatia and Latvia. Other major seafarer labour supply countries include Greece, United Kingdom, Ghana; and now companies are looking at Kenya, South Africa and others for the hospitality industry for the cruise ships.

== Issues in crewing ==
Human resources and the human element of crew management is of utmost importance to the sustainable development of maritime transportation, as well as in turn to global trade.

The main issue impacting the global crew management sector and the wider shipping industry is an expected shortage of qualified seafarers over the coming years, especially for specialised vessels such as chemical, LNG and LPG carriers, engineering officers, and officers at management level. The latter two mainly due to not having enough new vacancies open up to allow new cadets to receive the required training at sea, coupled with current market volatility.

Although the global supply of officers is forecast to increase steadily, it is predicted to be outpaced by increasing demand. This poses concerns for future shipping activity and the sustenance of maritime know-how; both on-board and ashore.

These forecasted future global shortage in the supply of seafarers have been reported by many major industry bodies, such as Drewry and the BIMCO/ICS Manpower Report, although differing in actual numbers. Regardless of the accuracy of these estimates, a continuing worldwide shortage of officers is also confirmed by the International Maritime Organization (IMO).

== See also ==
- Maritime history
- List of freight ship companies
- Technical management
- Shipping companies
- Shipping markets
- Sailor
- List of maritime colleges
- STCW Convention
- Glossary of nautical terms (disambiguation)
