= Blue Range =

Subrange of the Park Ranges in Alberta and British Columbia, Canada

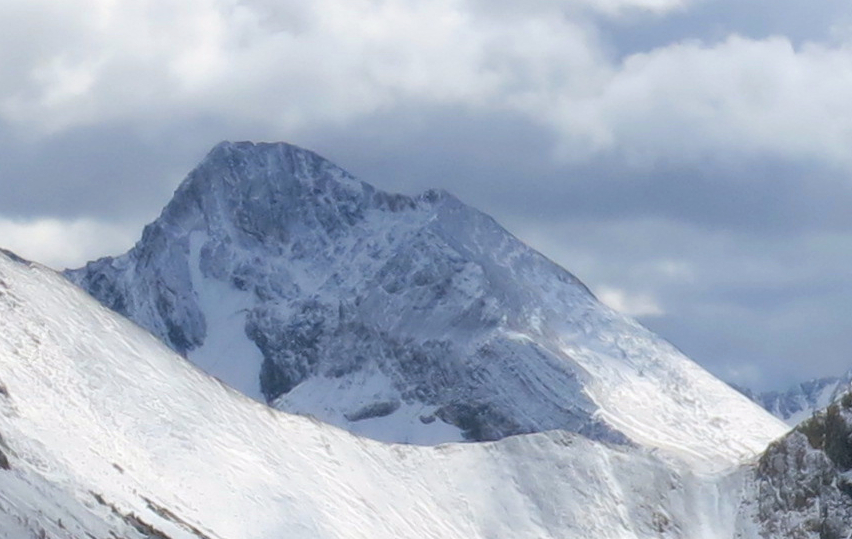
- Mount Byng from Wonder Pass

Highest point
- Peak: Mount Alcantara
- Elevation: 3,029 m (9,938 ft)
- Listing: Mountains of British Columbia
- Coordinates: 50°48′04″N 115°36′29″W

Dimensions
- Area: 193 km^{2} (75 mi^{2})

Geography
- Location within Alberta Location within British Columbia Location within Canada
- Country: Canada
- Provinces: Alberta; British Columbia
- Range coordinates: 50°48′11″N 115°32′06″W
- Parent range: Canadian Rockies
- Topo map: NTS 82J13 Mount Assiniboine

The Blue Range is a mountain range of the Canadian Rockies, located on the Continental Divide in Banff National Park, Canada. The range was so named on account of its blueish colour when viewed from afar. Mount Alcantara is the highest point in the range.

== List of mountains ==
This range includes the following mountains and peaks:

Rank	Mountain / Peak	Elevation		Prominence		FA	Coordinates
Rank	Mountain / Peak	m	ft	m	ft	FA	Coordinates
1	Mount Alcantara	3,029	9,938	899	2,949	1929	50°48′4″N 115°36′29″W
2	Mount Byng	2,940	9,650	510	1,670	1934	50°49′43″N 115°31′33″W
3	Red Man Mountain	2,891	9,485	551	1,808	1916	50°47′18″N 115°31′59″W
4	Mount Turner	2,806	9,206	389	1,276	Unk	50°51′16″N 115°28′39″W
5	Aurora Mountain	2,790	9,150	250	820	1916	50°49′30″N 115°32′34″W
6	Mount Currie	2,770	9,090	429	1,407	1916	50°48′11″N 115°29′32″W
7	Mount Morrison	2,765	9,072	133	436	1955	50°50′16″N 115°28′45″W
8	Marvel Peak	2,650	8,690	430	1,410	Unk	50°51′35″N 115°33′5″W
