= Wonder Peak =

Mountain in Western Canada

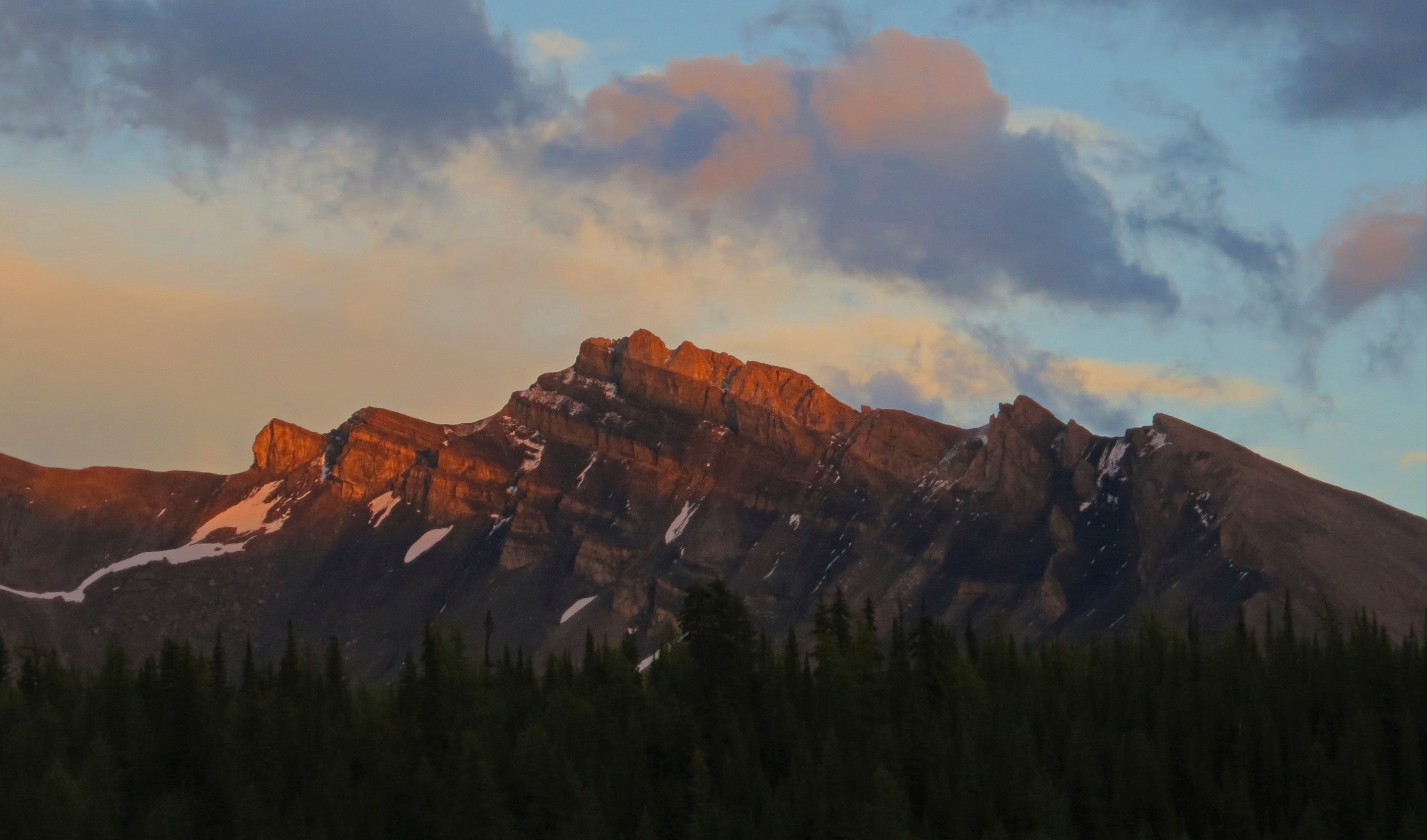
- Wonder Peak at sunset

Highest point
- Elevation: 2,852 m (9,357 ft)
- Prominence: 165 m (541 ft)
- Coordinates: 50°53′41″N 115°33′31″W

Geography
- Location within Alberta Location within British Columbia Location within Canada
- Location: Alberta; British Columbia
- Parent range: Canadian Rockies
- Topo map: NTS 82J13 Mount Assiniboine

Climbing
- First ascent: 1913 Conrad Kain, Boundary Commission

Wonder Peak is located on the border of Alberta and British Columbia in the Canadian Rockies. Situated on the Continental Divide, it also straddles the shared boundary of Banff National Park with Mount Assiniboine Provincial Park. It was named in 1913 by Arthur O. Wheeler and Conrad Kain.

== Geology ==
Wonder Peak is composed of sedimentary rock laid down from the Precambrian to Jurassic periods. Formed in shallow seas, this sedimentary rock was pushed east and over the top of younger rock during the Laramide orogeny.

== Climate ==
Based on the Köppen climate classification, Wonder Peak is located in a subarctic climate zone with cold, snowy winters, and mild summers.Temperatures can drop below -20°C with wind chill factors below -30°C.

== Gallery ==
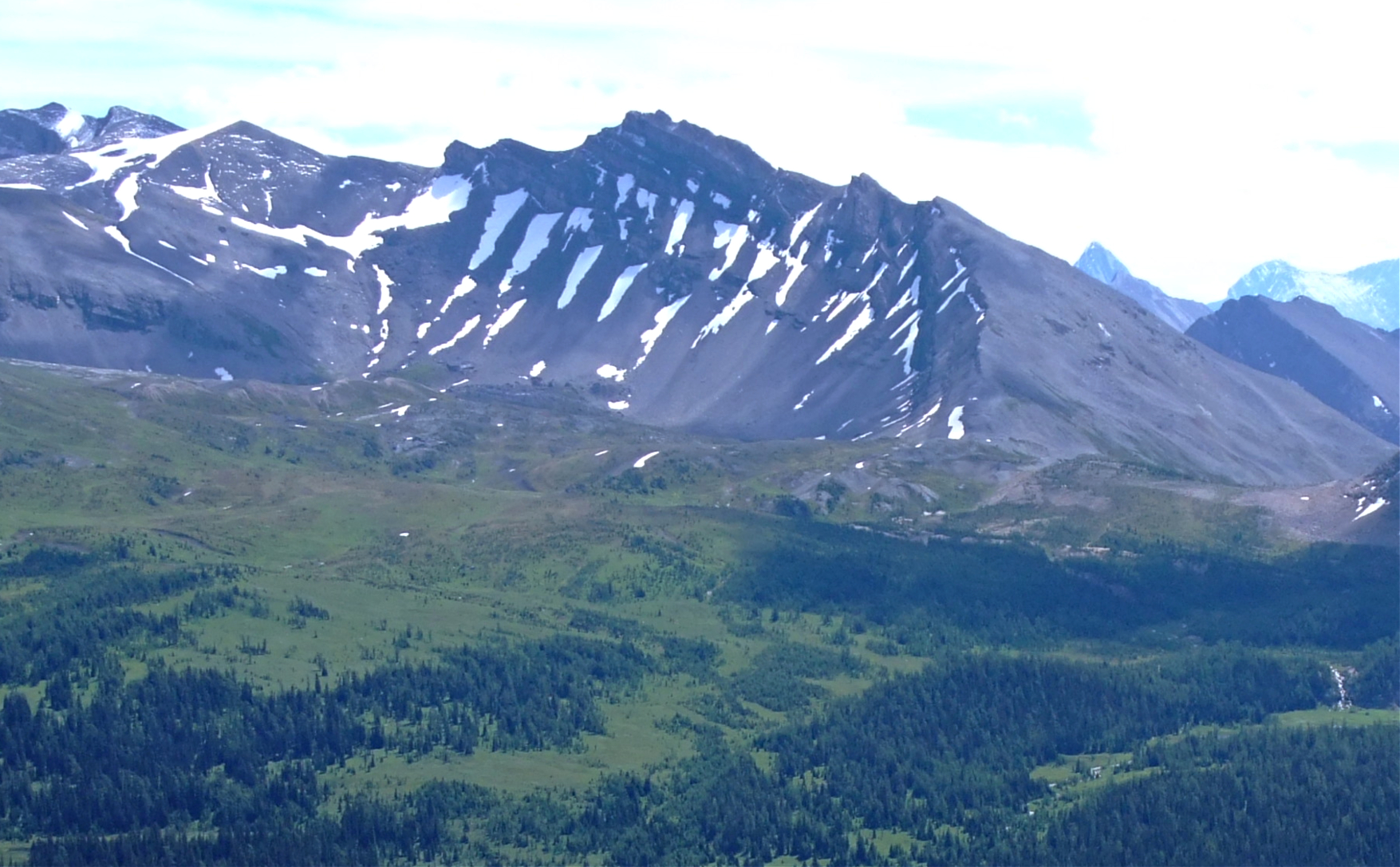
Wonder Peak from Mount Assiniboine Provincial Park

== See also ==
- List of peaks on the Alberta–British Columbia border
- List of mountains of Alberta
- Mountains of British Columbia
