= White Man Mountain =

Mountain in Canada

- Location within Alberta Location within British Columbia Location within Canada

Highest point
- Elevation: 2,967 m (9,734 ft)
- Prominence: 802 m (2,631 ft)
- Listing: Mountains of Alberta; Mountains of British Columbia
- Coordinates: 50°45′20″N 115°28′57″W

Naming
- Etymology: White Man Pass

Geography
- Country: Canada
- Provinces: Alberta and British Columbia
- Topo map: NTS 82J14 Spray Lakes Reservoir

Climbing
- First ascent: 1968 by D. Collins, C. Christu, D. Gainer, W. Lyons

White Man Mountain is located on the Continental Divide between Alberta and British Columbia. It was named by George Mercer Dawson in 1884 for nearby White Man Pass, and is Alberta's 92nd most prominent mountain.

== See also ==
- List of peaks on the Alberta–British Columbia border
