= Mount Alcantara =

Mountain in British Columbia, Canada

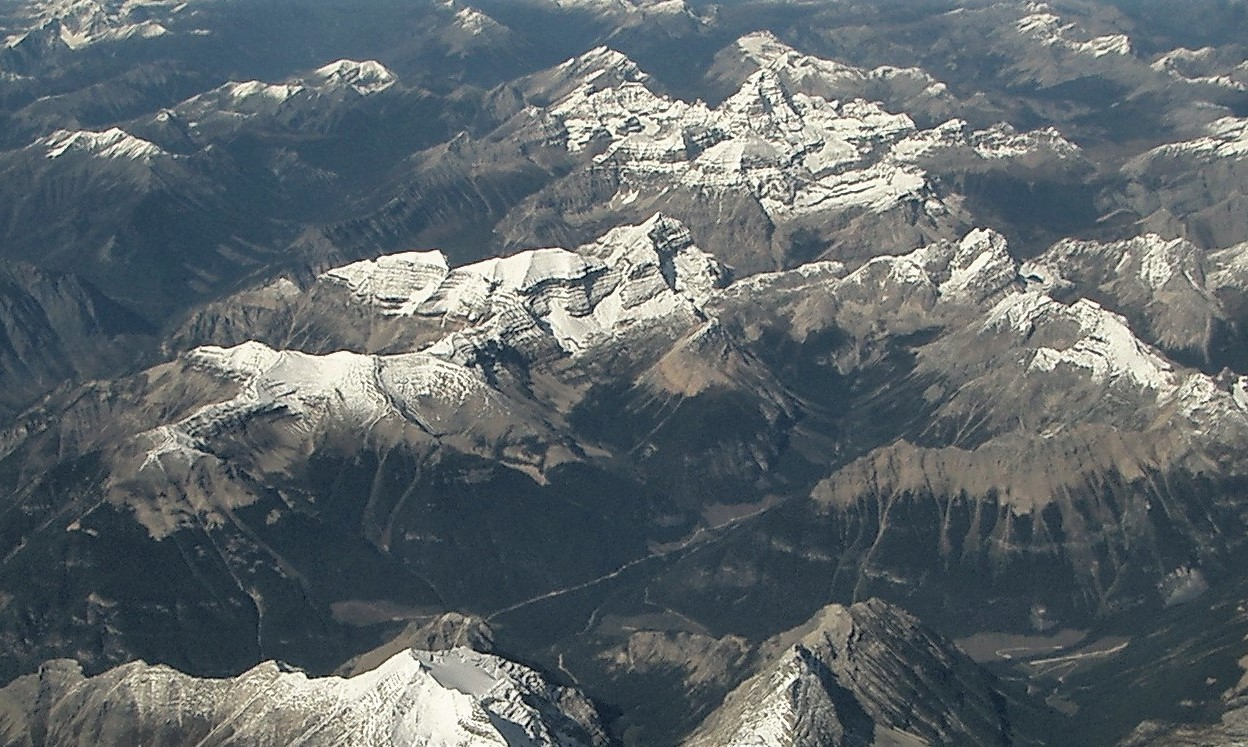
- Mount Alcantara centered

Highest point
- Elevation: 3,029 m (9,938 ft)
- Prominence: 869 m (2,851 ft)
- Parent peak: Eon Mountain (3,305 m)
- Isolation: 3.9 km (2.4 mi)
- Listing: Mountains of British Columbia
- Coordinates: 50°48′04″N 115°36′29″W

Geography
- Location within British Columbia Location within Canada
- Interactive map of Mount Alcantara
- Country: Canada
- Province: British Columbia
- District: Kootenay Land District
- Parent range: Blue Range; Canadian Rockies
- Topo map: NTS 82J13 Mount Assiniboine

Geology
- Rock age: Cambrian
- Mountain type: Fault block
- Rock type: Sedimentary rock

Climbing
- First ascent: 1929 by Kate Gardiner
- Easiest route: scrambling

Mount Alcantara is a 3,029-metre (9,938-foot) mountain summit located in British Columbia, Canada.

== Description ==
Mount Alcantara is the highest point in the Blue Range, a subrange of the Canadian Rockies. This remote peak is situated 3 km (1.9 mi) west of the Continental Divide and 8 km (5.0 mi) south-southeast of majestic Mount Assiniboine. Precipitation runoff from Alcantara drains into Alcantara and Aurora creeks which are both part of the Cross River watershed. Topographic relief is significant as the summit rises over 1,500 meters (4,920 feet) above Aurora Creek in two kilometers (1.2 mile).

== History ==
Mount Alcantara was named in 1916 to remember the RMS Alcantara, an ocean liner that was converted to an armed merchant cruiser and was sunk by the German raider Greif during the First World War. The mountain's toponym was officially adopted October 12, 1966, by the Geographical Names Board of Canada.

The first ascent of the summit was made in 1929 by Kate (Katie) Gardiner with guide Walter Feuz.

== Geology ==
Mount Alcantara is composed of sedimentary rock laid down during the Precambrian to Jurassic periods and was later pushed east and over the top of younger rock during the Laramide orogeny.

== Climate ==
Based on the Köppen climate classification, Mount Alcantara is located in a subarctic climate with cold, snowy winters, and mild summers. Temperatures can drop below −20 °C with wind chill factors below −30 °C.

== See also ==
- Geography of British Columbia
