= Boeing Model 204 =

Type of aircraft

Model 204
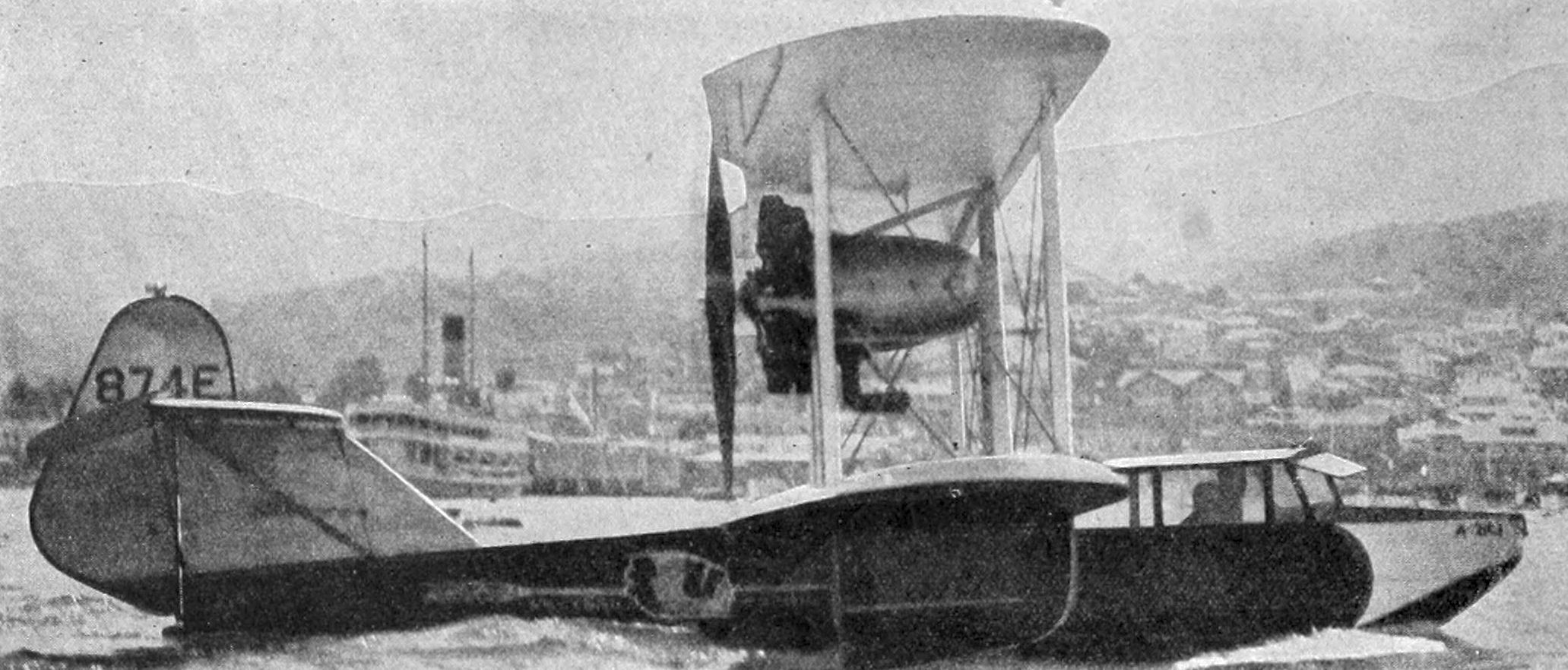

General information
- Type: passenger flying-boat
- National origin: United States
- Manufacturer: Boeing
- Number built: 7

History
- Introduction date: 1929
- Developed from: Boeing Model 6E

The Boeing Model 204 was an American biplane, pusher configuration flying-boat aircraft built by Boeing in 1929. Externally, the 204 looked identical to the Boeing Model 6E, but a number of internal changes, including increasing the passenger capacity to four, gave it a new type certificate and model number.

== Development ==
Construction was started on five aircraft, but only two were completed. The first, designated 204 and the second 204A. A third aircraft was built by a private owner who had bought the three incomplete machines. The 204A was a dual-control version which was later owned by Peter Barnes, who flew it on his private Seattle-Victoria, British Columbia main run.

The C-204 Thunderbird, a modified 204, was the first type produced by Boeing Aircraft of Canada. These had altered wing and tailplane incidence and a reduction in upper wing area. The prototype was first flown on 30 March 1930, the first of a batch of four. They failed to sell readily, though they were sometimes leased for work. Eventually three were sold. All worked in British Columbia, remaining active until 1939.

== Variants ==
204
Four-seat variant of the Model 6E, one built.

204A
As the Model 204 with dual-control, one built.

C-204 Thunderbird
Four 204s built by Boeing Canada.

== Specifications (204) ==
Data from Bowers, 1966, pg. 138

General characteristics

- Crew: one pilot
- Capacity: four passengers
- Length: 32 ft 7 in (9.93 m)
- Wingspan: 39 ft 8.25 in (12.10 m)
- Height: 12 ft 0 in (3.66 m)
- Wing area: 470 sq ft (43.66 m^{2})
- Empty weight: 3,298 lb (1,496 kg)
- Gross weight: 4,940 lb (2,240 kg)
- Powerplant: 1 × Pratt & Whitney R-1340 Wasp , 410 hp (305 kW)

Performance

- Maximum speed: 115 mph (185 km/h, 100 kn)
- Cruise speed: 95 mph (153 km/h, 83 kn)
- Range: 350 mi (563 km, 300 nmi)
- Service ceiling: 9,000 ft (2,743 m)
- Rate of climb: 1,000 ft/min (5.1 m/s)
