= Mount Byng =

Mountain in Banff NP, Alberta, Canada

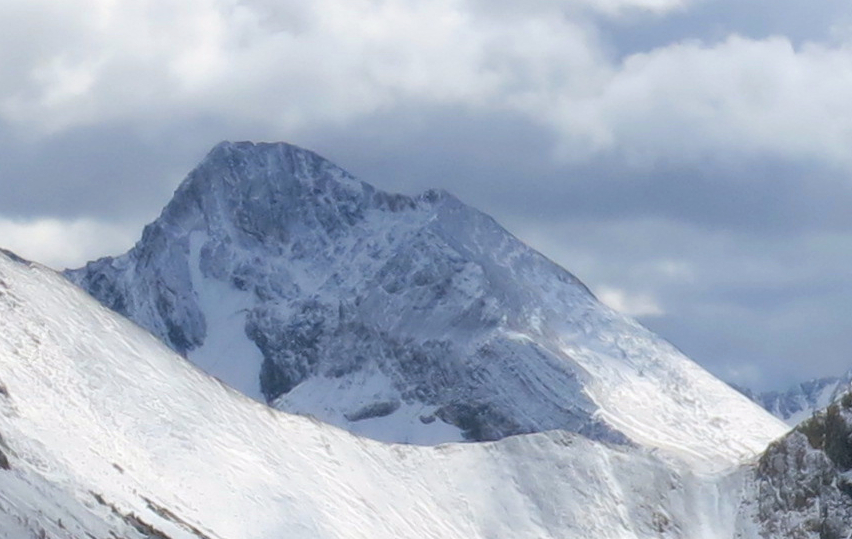
- Mount Byng from Wonder Pass

Highest point
- Elevation: 2,940 m (9,650 ft)
- Prominence: 510 m (1,670 ft)
- Parent peak: Mount Alcantara (3029 m)
- Isolation: 6.57 km (4.08 mi)
- Listing: Mountains of Alberta
- Coordinates: 50°49′43″N 115°31′33″W

Geography
- Location within Alberta Location within Canada
- Country: Canada
- Province: Alberta
- Protected area: Banff National Park
- Parent range: Blue Range; Canadian Rockies
- Topo map: NTS 82J13 Mount Assiniboine

Geology
- Rock age: Cambrian
- Rock type: Sedimentary rock

Climbing
- First ascent: 1934, H.S. Crosby, Rudolph Aemmer
- Easiest route: Scramble

Mount Byng is a 2,940-metre (9,650-foot) mountain summit located in the upper Spray River Valley of southern Banff National Park, in the Canadian Rockies of Alberta, Canada. It is the second-highest point in the Blue Range. Mount Byng's nearest higher peak is Mount Alcantara, 6.5 km (4.0 mi) to the west-southwest. The majestic Mount Assiniboine is situated 10 km (6.2 mi) to the northwest of Byng.

== History ==
Mount Byng was named in 1918 for Julian Byng, 1st Viscount Byng of Vimy, a British Field Marshal who served during the First World War where he commanded the Canadian Corps, and later served as Governor General of Canada.

The mountain's name was made official in 1928 by the Geographical Names Board of Canada.

The first ascent was made in 1934 by H.S. Crosby, with guide Rudolph Aemmer.

== Geology ==
Mount Byng is composed of sedimentary rock laid down during the Precambrian to Jurassic periods and was later pushed east and over the top of younger rock during the Laramide orogeny.

== Climate ==
Based on the Köppen climate classification, Mount Byng is located in a subarctic climate with cold, snowy winters, and mild summers. Temperatures can drop below −20 °C with wind chill factors below −30 °C. In terms of favorable weather, June through September are the best months to climb. Precipitation runoff from the mountain drains into Owl Creek and Currie Creek, which empty into the Spray Lakes Reservoir.

== See also ==
- Geography of Alberta
