= Technical management =

Efforts to balance multiple factors during the lifetime of a system or process

In general, technical management is the systematic efforts used in the deployment of a system or process and in balancing its cost, effectiveness and supportability during its life cycle.

Technical managers can be found at the interface of application and technique; they act between the user and the technical means. Examples of technical management are: ICT management, real estate management, financial management, quality management. Often the managed field is a resource of the organisation. Technical managers combine technical and management knowledge for the benefit of the user.

In logistics, technical management involves the duties a shipping company must perform for the technical operation of a vessel. This involves management related to crew management with related tasks, logistics related to operations as well as operations, service and maintenance. Often technical management is performed by the ship owning company, but not always. Technical management is sometimes performed by separate companies than the commercial management, that involves chartering of the vessels and the financial aspects that is performed by the owner company.
