= Boeing B-1 =

B-1
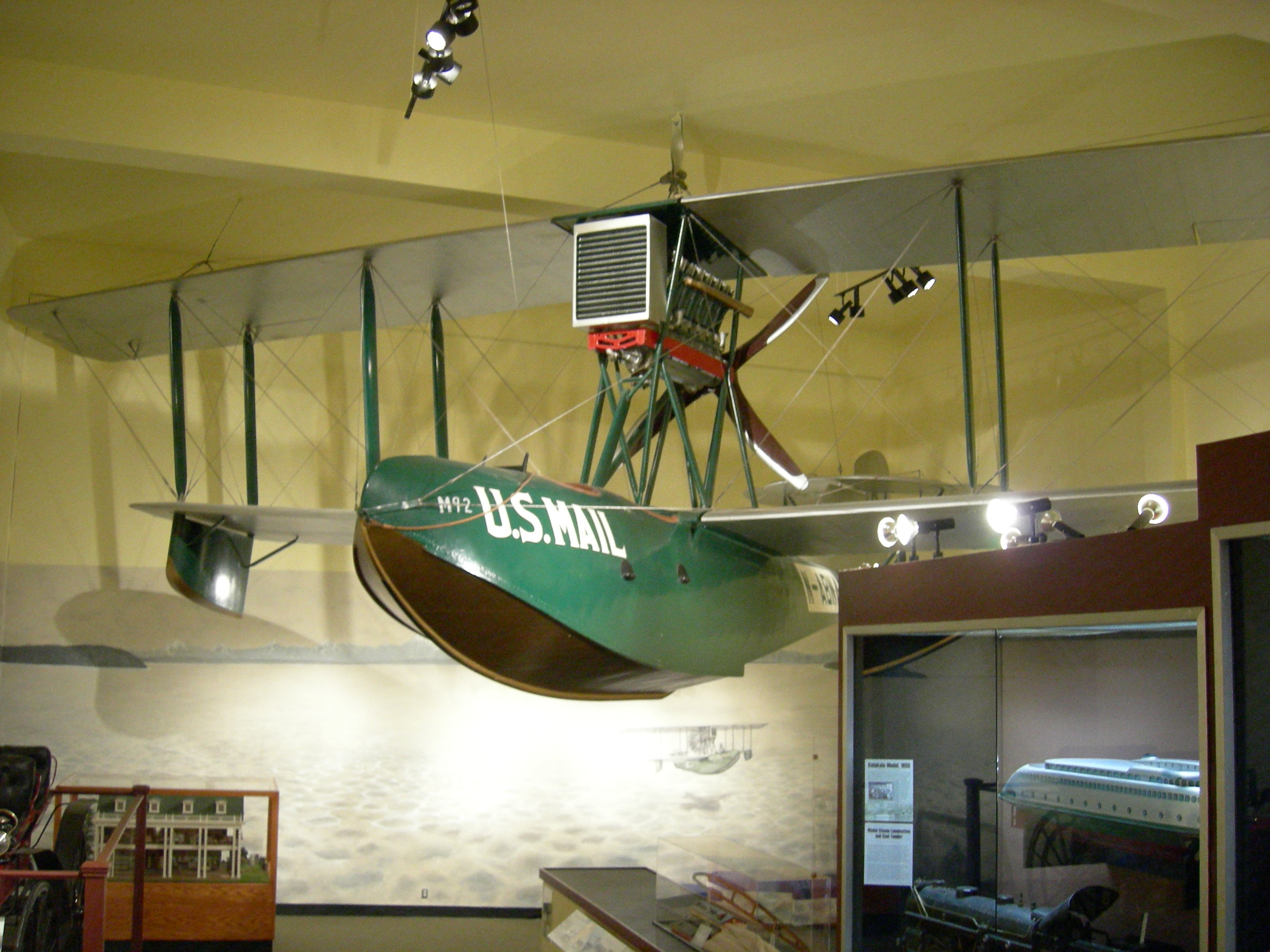
- Model 6 on display at the Museum of History and Industry in Seattle

General information
- Type: Utility flying boat
- Manufacturer: Boeing
- Designer: William Boeing
- Number built: 1

History
- Manufactured: 1919 - 1927
- First flight: 27 December 1919

The Boeing B-1 (company designation Model 6) is a small biplane flying boat designed by William Boeing shortly after World War I.

== Design and development ==
The Model 6 was the first commercial design for Boeing (as opposed to military or experimental designs), hence the B-1 designation. Its layout was conventional for its day, with a Hall-Scott engine driving a pusher propeller mounted amongst the cabane struts. The pilot sat in an open cockpit at the bow, and up to two passengers could be carried in a second open cockpit behind the first. The design was reminiscent of the Curtiss HS-2L that Boeing had been building under license during the war.

== Operational history ==
Only a single aircraft was built, as Boeing had trouble selling it in a market flooded with war-surplus aircraft. In 1920, it was purchased by Edward Hubbard, who used it to carry air mail between Seattle, Washington and Victoria, British Columbia. Air mail service began on 27 December 1919, and continued for eight years. The plane flew until 1930 before being preserved and put on display at Seattle's Museum of History and Industry in 1954.

== Specifications ==
Data from Bowers, Boeing B-1 Seaplane page

General characteristics

- Crew: one pilot
- Capacity: 2 passengers
- Length: 31 ft 3 in (9.53 m)
- Wingspan: 50 ft 3 in (15.32 m)
- Height: 13 ft 4 in (4.06 m)
- Wing area: 492 sq ft (45.7 m^{2})
- Empty weight: 2,400 lb (1,089 kg)
- Gross weight: 3,850 lb (1,746 kg)
- Powerplant: 1 × Hall-Scott L-6 , 200 hp (149 kW)

Performance

- Maximum speed: 90 mph (145 km/h, 78 kn)
- Cruise speed: 80 mph (128 km/h, 70 kn)
- Range: 400 mi (640 km, 350 nmi)
- Service ceiling: 13,300 ft (4,050 m)

== Boeing B-1D ==
Between May 1928 and April 1929, Boeing built two B-1Ds. Apart from the shape of the rudder, all other structural details were different to the original biplane

=== Specifications ===
Data from Source

General characteristics

- Crew: one pilot
- Capacity: 3 passengers
- Length: 30 ft 9 in (9.37 m)
- Wingspan: 39 ft 8.25 in (12.1 m)
- Height: 12 ft 0 in (3.66 m)
- Wing area: 466 sq ft (43.29 m^{2})
- Empty weight: 2,442 lb (1,108 kg)
- Gross weight: 3,442 lb (1,620 kg)
- Powerplant: 1 × Wright JF-5 and Pratt & Whitney Wasp , 220 and 420 hp (160 and 310 kW)

Performance

- Maximum speed: 95 mph (153 km/h, 83 kn)
- Cruise speed: 80 mph (129 km/h, 70 kn)
- Service ceiling: 12,000 ft (3,658 m)

== Boeing B-1E ==
The six planes built from March 1928 were identical to the first B-1D except for heavier construction, the engine, and a redesigned rudder.

=== Specifications ===
Data from Source

General characteristics

- Crew: one pilot
- Capacity: 3 passengers
- Length: 30 ft 9 in (9.37 m)
- Wingspan: 39 ft 8.25 in (12.1 m)
- Height: 12 ft 0 in (3.66 m)
- Wing area: 466 sq ft (43.29 m^{2})
- Empty weight: 3,090 lb (1,402 kg)
- Gross weight: 4,550 lb (2,064 kg)
- Powerplant: 1 × Pratt & Whitney Wasp , 410 hp (310 kW)

Performance

- Maximum speed: 115 mph (185 km/h, 100 kn)
- Cruise speed: 105 mph (169 km/h, 91 kn)
- Range: 450 mi (724 km, 390 nmi)
- Service ceiling: 12,000 ft (3,658 m)
