= Société des Avions Marcel Bloch =

1929–1935 aircraft manufacturer in France

- Industry: Aeronautics, defence
- Founded: 1929
- Founder: Marcel Bloch
- Defunct: 1947
- Fate: Merged
- Successor: Société des avions Marcel Dassault
- Headquarters: Boulogne-Billancourt, French Third Republic / Provisional Government of the French Republic / French Fourth Republic
- Products: Aircraft

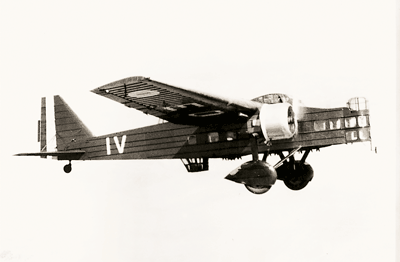
Bloch MB.200 in flight

The Société des Avions Marcel Bloch was a French aircraft manufacturer of military and civilian aircraft. It was founded by the aeronautical designer Marcel Bloch (hence "MB" in the aircraft designations), who had previously played a major role in the Société d'Études Aéronautiques, an early French aircraft manufacturer active largely during the First World War.

Following the end of the Second World War, Marcel Bloch changed his name to Marcel Dassault (as in char d'assault, French for "tank") to honour the military nickname adopted by his brother, Darius Paul Dassault. Accordingly, the company was also rebranded as Dassault Aviation, becoming a prominent manufacturer of jet-powered aircraft such as the Dassault Mirage fighter series and the Dassault Falcon family of business aircraft.

== History ==
The origins of the company are closely associated with the activities of its founder, the French aeronautical designer Marcel Bloch. Having previously been a senior figure in the Société d'Études Aéronautiques, an aircraft manufacturing company that produced largely numbers of aircraft for the French military during the First World War, Bloch had considerable experience in the field prior to founding his own company; however, due to a lack of support from the French Government's aircraft manufacturing department to support the nation's manufacturers following the conflict's end and an associated downturn in aviation sales, Bloch had temporarily withdrawn from the sector during the late 1910s in favour of the real estate business.

During 1928, the French state established a dedicated Air Ministry, signalling that government interest in the aviation sector had returned. In response, Bloch decided to found his own company, the Société des Avions Marcel Bloch, to resume aviation activities within. A key early order for Bloch was issued by the French engineer Albert Caquot, who sought a tri-engined aircraft suitable for postal services.

During late 1931, the company received its first order from a French government entity. Accordingly, manufacturing activity commenced on both the MB.80, a single-engined aircraft orientated towards MEDEVAC operations, and the MB.120, a three-engined 10-passenger colonial transport aircraft, on behalf of the French Air Force. In response to rising demand for the company's produced, Marcel Bloch restructured the business, establishing separate design and manufacturing departments, while additional premises in the form of a garage in Boulogne were also arranged. During September 1932, for the purpose of manufacturing both production aircraft and future prototypes, Bloch also rented larger premises in Courbevoie.

By 1934, Marcel Bloch recognised that France's aviation industry was approaching a manufacturing crisis, having anticipating shortcomings in production capacity and capabilities. Seeking additional capacity, Bloch reached an agreement with the aviation industrialist and past business associate Henry Potez, who owned the largest aviation company in France at the time. During January 1935, the two men cooperated to purchase another aircraft manufacturer, the Société Aérienne Bordelaise (SAB) which, as the Société Aéronautique du Sud-Ouest (SASO), was responsible for manufacturing both the MB.200 and MB.210 bombers. Separately, Bloch and Potez also purchased the majority of the shares of the Société des Moteurs et Automobiles Lorraine (SMAL) company.

The 1930s was a time of considerable social upheaval in France; seeking positive relations with influential trade unions, Bloch engaged directly with their representatives, leading to numerous additional benefits being granted to the company's employees, such as a week's paid leave from 1935. One year later, France's Popular Front-led government issued a policy permitting two weeks’ paid holidays per year; in response, Bloch employees were given three weeks paid holiday per year. On 17 July 1936, the French government issued a new law that nationalised the nation's armament industry; this development heavily impacted for private aircraft companies as many were forcibly acquired and merged. That year saw the creation of seven nationalised aeronautical manufacturing companies: six for aircraft (SNCASE, SNCASO, SNCAN, SNCAO, SNCAM, SNCAC), and one for aircraft engines (SNCM - Lorraine-Dietrich).

On 16 January 1937, the Société des Avions Marcel Bloch was formally nationalised; its assets, including its factories at Courbevoie, Châteauroux-Déols, Villacoublay, Bordeaux, formed a major portion of the newly established Société nationale de constructions aéronautiques du Sud-Ouest (SNCASO). Marcel Bloch was requested by the Minister for Air, Pierre Cot, to serve as the company's delegated administrator. While he had effectively lost ownership, and much of the control, of his company, Bloch was initially given a relatively free hand in the management of the development workshop. This independence was later curtailed via amendments to the original nationalisation act.

During 1937, the French Government, recognising the looming threat of another World War with neighbouring Nazi Germany, launched a rearmament programme. Accordingly, the production of large numbers of capable combat aircraft to meet the challenge of the rapidly-expanding Luftwaffe was therefore a major national priority. The company's designs, such as the MB.150 single-engined fighter and the MB.170 twin-engined bomber, were amongst those aircraft produced to meet this demand. As well as entire aircraft, the production of propellers was a major undertaking of the firm, as they were procured by various other French manufacturers for their own aircraft. Both Bloch and Potez were active in efforts to expand manufacturing capacity, leading to purchasing of land in Saint-Cloud (the western suburbs of Paris) for the construction of a new factory in 1938.

Following the outbreak of the Second World War during early September 1939, France's aeronautics manufacturing efforts reached a frantic pace, trying to satisfy the rapid order of thousands of airplanes, many of which had been placed too late to be fulfilled prior to the start of serious fighting in Western Europe. During the early months of the conflict, commonly referred to as Phoney War, Bloch accelerated production while endeavouring to achieve ever-greater performance from a series of rushed prototypes. On 15 February 1940, Marcel Bloch discontinued his involvement with SNCASO following a dispute with the French Air Ministry. Following the Battle of France and the Armistice of 22 June 1940 marking France's surrender, the French aviation industry, including all equipment, stocks and industrial establishments, were turned over intact to Germany. Accordingly, the French aviation industry was virtually disbanded in near-totality and aircraft manufacturing effectively ceased.

During this period, Marcel Bloch was interned by Vichy France officials, while endeavours were made by the company to preserve its remaining interests, leading to the appointment of a board of directors, the issuing of articles of association, and Marcel Bloch's installation of chairman on 31 December 1940. Despite pressure to collaborate, Marcel repeatedly refused to cooperate with the Germans. In response, the Germans requisitioned the Saint-Cloud factory, placing its manufacturing activity under the control of the Junkers aviation company.

Following the liberation of the Buchenwald concentration camp on 11 April 1945, Marcel Bloch was freed from German captivity. However, by the end of the Second World War, the majority of France's aeronautical industrial facilities had been reduced to ruins, while its design offices had been dispersed. Bloch, remaining confident in the demand for commercial aviation in the new postwar era, was keen to relaunch his company. Accordingly, it was rebranded as Dassault Aviation.

== Aircraft models ==
=== Military ===
- MB.80 & MB.81, air ambulance, 1932 (first flight)
- MB.200, bomber, 1933
  - MB.201, prototype version powered by two Hispano-Suiza 12Ybrs engines
  - MB.202, prototype version powered by four Gnome-Rhône 7Kdrs engines
  - MB.203, prototype version powered by two Clerget 14F diesel engines
- MB.210, bomber, successor of the MB.200, 1934
  - MB.211 Verdun, prototype with retractable landing gear and powered by two Hispano-Suiza 12Y engines, 1935
  - MB.212, MB.211 re-engined with Hispano-Suiza 14A engines
  - MB.218, four-seat seaplane bomber project, 1937
- MB.130, reconnaissance bomber, prototype for MB.131, 1934
  - MB.131, reconnaissance-bomber, improved MB.130, 1936
  - MB.133, prototype with revised tail, 1937
  - MB.134, prototype with two Hispano-Suiza 14AA engines, 1937
  - MB.135, four-engine derivative of the MB.131, 1939
- MB.150, fighter, prototype for MB.151, 1937
  - MB.151, initial production version, powered by a Gnome-Rhône 14N-35 engine
  - MB.152, version powered by a Gnome-Rhône 14N-25 engine
  - MB.153, prototype version powered by a Pratt & Whitney R-1830 Twin Wasp engine
  - MB.154, proposed version powered by a Wright R-1820 Cyclone engine, not built
  - MB.155, version powered by a Gnome-Rhône 14N-49 engine
  - MB.156, proposed version powered by a Gnome-Rhône 14R engine, not built
  - MB.157, prototype advanced version, converted from a MB.152 and powered by a Gnome-Rhône 14R-4 engine
- MB.170 reconnaissance/bomber, 1938
  - MB.174, version powered by Gnome-Rhône 14N-49 engines
  - MB.175, bomber version with redesigned bomb bay
  - MB.176, version powered by Pratt & Whitney R-1830-SC3-G Twin Wasp engines
  - MB.177, prototype version powered by Hispano-Suiza 12Y-31 engines
  - MB.178, proposed development, cancelled due to arrival of the Germans
- MB.462, c.1938
- MB.500, monoplane trainer, 1938
- MB.690, c.1938
- MB.730, c.1938
- MB.480, torpedo bomber/reconnaissance floatplane, 1939
- MB.162, four-engine, long-range bomber developed from the MB.160, 1940
- MB.800, three-seat trainer/mailplane, 1940; one aircraft completed during WWII as the Sud-Ouest SO.80
- MB.700, monoplane interceptor, 1941

=== Civilian ===
- MB.60, trimotor mailplane, 1930; initially known as the MB.VI
  - MB.61, version with Lorraine 5Pc engines
- MB.90, light aircraft, 1932; first French all-metal aircraft
  - MB.91, as MB.90 but with rounded tailfin, diverging wing struts and faired-in landing gear; never flown
  - MB.92 Grande Tourisme, similar to the MB.91 but with tandem seating, 1932
  - MB.93, modified MB.90 with a de Havilland Gipsy Major I engine and MB.91 landing gear, tailfin and struts
  - MB.100, four-seat development, powered by a Hispano-Suiza 5Q engine
- MB.110, mailplane, 1933
- MB.120, three-engine transport/airliner developed from the MB.71, 1932
- MB.141 two-seat light aircraft derived from the MB.81, 1934
- MB.160, high-speed, four-engine airliner, 1937
- MB.220, twin-engine airliner, 1935
  - MB.221, six surviving MB.220s re-engined with Wright R-1820-97 Cyclone engines
- MB.300 Pacifique, three-engine airliner, 1935
- MB.161, four-engine airliner developed from the MB.160, 1939; produced postwar as the SNCASE SE.161 Languedoc
