= Bloch MB.81 =

1930s French air ambulance aircraft

MB.81
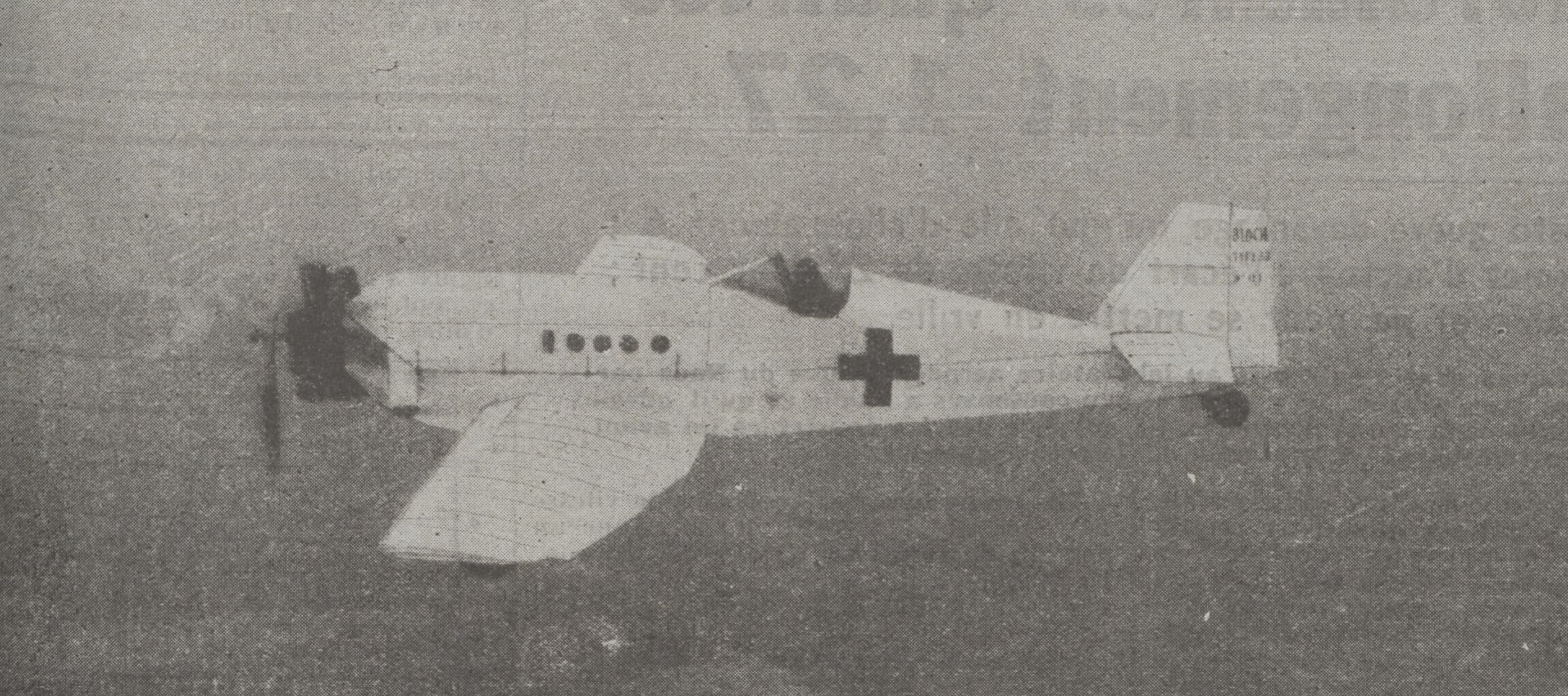
- A flying Bloch MB.81, circa 1934

General information
- Type: Air ambulance
- Manufacturer: Bloch
- Designer: Marcel Bloch
- Status: retired
- Primary user: Armée de l'Air
- Number built: 21

History
- Introduction date: 1935
- First flight: Mid-1932

The MB.81 was a French military aircraft built by Société des Avions Marcel Bloch as a flying ambulance since it was designed to carry one passenger, in or out of a stretcher. Developed in response to a government-sponsored competition in support of the new doctrine of "aerial first aid", it was employed exclusively in the overseas colonies, specifically Morocco and Syria. Unlike the MB.80 prototype, the MB.81 had a closed cockpit and a somewhat larger cargo space. This was the company's first design to reach production.

== History ==
Based on experience of using modified Breguet XIV as ambulance aircraft during the Rif War in Morocco and in French administered Syria and the Lebanon, in 1929, the French Ministry of War launched a programme to acquire a new ambulance aircraft. The recently established Société des Avions Marcel Bloch proposed a design to meet this requirement, but as the company was busy with the MB.60 mailplane, submitted its proposal too late to gain an official order for a prototype. Marcel Bloch, the founder of the company, decided to design and build an aircraft to meet the requirement as a private venture, using his own money.

The Bloch design, the MB.80, was an all-metal monoplane with low wings. A casualty could be carried, lying prone on a stretcher, in an enclosed compartment behind the engine, which was accessed via a full length door on the port side of the compartment, allowing the patient to be easily loaded and unloaded, while the pilot was provided with an open cockpit behind the stretcher compartment on the starboard side of the fuselage. The stretcher compartment was fitted with padding to help soundproof it, while the stretcher was mounted on rubber shock absorbers to minimise vibration. Oxygen and an electrically-heated suit could be provided for the patient, who could communicate with the pilot using a speaking tube arrangement (known as an "Aviaphone"). The aircraft had a wide-track fixed conventional landing gear, with low pressure tyres and a tailwheel, with brakes fitted to the mainwheels to ease operations out of unprepared airstrips.

The prototype MB.80, which had been built for Bloch at the Letord factory at Meudon near Paris, made its first flight in July 1932 at Villacoublay, piloted by Zacharie Heu. It was powered by a five cylinder Lorraine 5Pc radial engine of 89 kW (120 hp) which allowed it to reach a speed of 190 km/h (120 mph), and an altitude of 6,100 m (20,000 ft). It was able to take off in 70 m (230 ft) and to land in 95 m (312 ft). In a 1932 test, the MB.80 carried out 209 landings in thirty-six hours without any problems.

Based on the largely successful trials, an order was placed by the Ground French Forces (the French Armée de l'Air was not founded until 1933) with Bloch for 20 aircraft. As the MB.80 had proven to be underpowered for its intended use in hot climates, a 175 hp (130 kW) Salmson 9Nd 9-cylinder radial engine, with the modified type becoming the MB.81, and was the first production order placed with the Bloch company. The modified prototype, designated the MB.81.01, flew in October 1932. Deliveries of the 19 production aircraft, built at Bloch's new factory at Courbevoie, a suburb of Paris, began in 1933, continuing to 1936.

The production model, called the MB.81, was fitted with a French Salmson 9Nd of 128.68 kW (175 hp). It took part in military operations in Morocco and in Syria at the beginning of the 1930s.

The MB.81 entered service in 1935, and was used extensively throughout North Africa and the Middle East. A few were used in 1939–1940, before the French surrender, and in July 1941 in the battle for Syria between the Vichy French and the British/Free French.

== Variants ==
MB.80
prototype (1 built)
MB.81
production version (20 built)

== Operators ==
France

- Armee de l'Air

Vichy France

== Specifications ==
Data from Les Débacle des Ambulanciers...

General characteristics

- Crew: 1
- Capacity: 1 seated or stretchered
- Length: 8.40 m (27 ft 7 in)
- Wingspan: 12.59 m (41 ft 4 in)
- Height: 2.90 m (9 ft 6 in)
- Empty weight: 580 kg (1,279 lb)
- Gross weight: 880 kg (1,940 lb)
- Powerplant: 1 × Salmson 9Nd 9-cylinder air-cooled radial piston engine, 130 kW (175 hp)

Performance

- Maximum speed: 188 km/h (117 mph, 102 kn)
- Cruise speed: 160 km/h (99 mph, 86 kn) at 2,500 m (8,200 ft)
- Range: 655 km (407 mi, 354 nmi)
- Service ceiling: 6,400 m (21,000 ft)

== See also ==
Related lists

- List of aircraft of the French Air Force during World War II
- List of aircraft of World War II
- List of interwar military aircraft
- List of military aircraft of France

== Bibliography ==
- Balous, Miroslav (2002). "Letadla 39–45: Bloch M.B.80/81". Letectví + Kosmonautica (in Czech). No. 10. p. 665. ISSN 0024-1156.
- Comas, Mathieu (September 1999). "La débacle des ambulanciers... ou l'histoire inconnu d'une section d'avions ambulanciers en mai-juin 1940" [Debacle of the Ambulances: Or the Unknown History of an Aerial Ambulance Section in May–June 1940]. Avions: Toute l'Aéronautique et Son Histoire (in French). No. 78. pp. 18–21. ISSN 1243-8650.
- Cortet, Pierre (September 2001). "Rétros du Mois" [Retros of the Month]. Avions: Toute l'Aéronautique et son histoire (in French). No. 102. p. 7. ISSN 1243-8650.
- de Narbonne, Roland (April 2016). "Marcel Bloch MB.80: L'ambulance du ciel". Le Fana de l'Aviation (in French). No. 557. pp. 30–34. ISSN 0757-4169.
