= Bloch MB.150 =

Fighter aircraft in France

MB.150
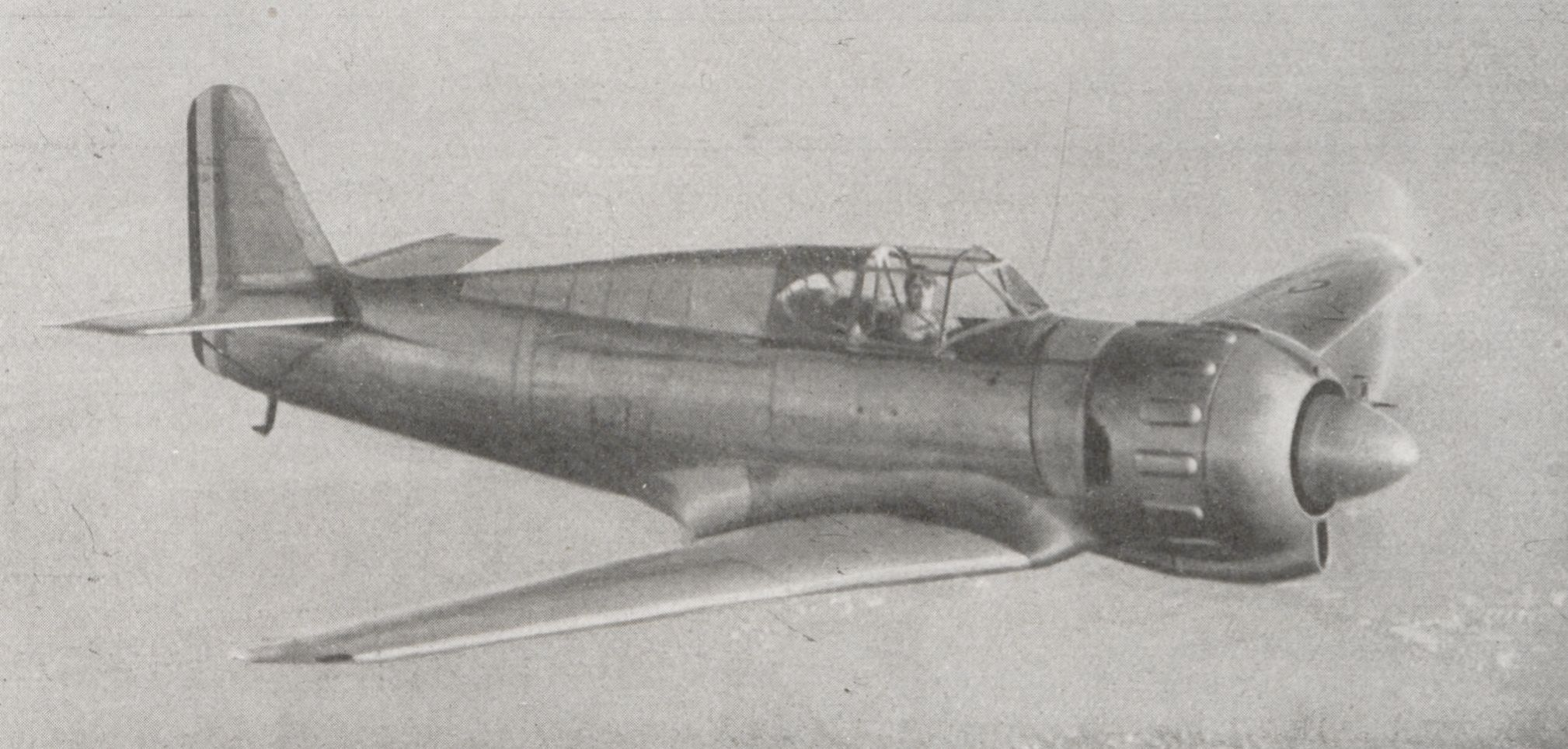
- MB.151 in flight, 1938

General information
- Type: Fighter aircraft
- Manufacturer: SNCASO
- Status: Retired
- Primary users: French Air Force French Naval Aviation; Vichy French Air Force; Royal Hellenic Air Force
- Number built: c. 663

History
- Introduction date: 1939
- First flight: 29 September 1937

The Bloch MB.150 (later MB.151 to MB.157) was a French fighter aircraft developed and produced by Société des Avions Marcel Bloch. It featured an all-metal construction, complete with a retractable undercarriage, low cantilever wing and an enclosed cockpit.

The MB.150 was originally developed to conform with the requirements of the 1934 French Air Ministry competition seeking a new fighter design. Despite the competition being won by the competing Morane-Saulnier M.S.406, it was decided to proceed with development. After failing to take off, the modified prototype conducted its maiden flight in October 1937. Service trials of the MB.150 determined the aircraft to hold sufficient promise to warrant further work, leading to the adoption of an expanded and strengthened wing and a more refined Gnome-Rhone 14N-7 engine. During spring 1938, following the completion of further proving trials, an order for a pre-production batch of 25 aircraft was placed.

Redesigns of the MB.150 design led to the improved MB.151 and MB.152 which entered squadron service with the Armée de l'Air. By the outbreak of the Second World War, around 120 aircraft had been delivered to the Armée de l'Air but most were not sufficiently equipped to be considered operational. An improved MB.155 had greater range. Ordered into production in 1940, only ten aircraft had been completed by the Fall of France. The MB.157, a further improved model with a heavier and more powerful engine, was completed during the Vichy era. Though it demonstrated promising performance, it did not enter production.

== Development ==
=== Origins ===
On 13 July 1934, the Service Technique Aéronautique (Aeronautical Technical Service) of the French Air Force issued the "C1 design" requirement for a new and modern single-seat interceptor fighter. Envisioning a monoplane layout and a retractable undercarriage, the prospective fighter was to serve as a replacement for the French Air Force's Dewoitine D.371, Dewoitine D.500, and Loire 46 aircraft. Amongst the companies who took interest in the specification, to which the potential for a large production order was attached, was French aircraft manufacturer Société des Avions Marcel Bloch.

The design team, headed by Maurice Roussel, was assembled at Bloch's Courbevoie facility in Paris. They designed an all-metal stressed skin monoplane, powered by a 930 hp (690 kW) Gnome-Rhône 14Kfs radial engine and armed with a pair of wing-mounted Hispano-Suiza HS.404 cannon. During September 1935, construction of the first prototype, the Bloch 150-01, commenced.

Although the C.1 competition was won by a rival design, the Morane-Saulnier M.S.406, it was decided independently to continue with development. During 1936, these efforts culminated in the first attempted flight of the MB.150.01 prototype; unfortunately, the aircraft proved unable to get off the ground. Amidst the disappointment, work on the design was temporarily halted and then resumed during early 1937. A strengthened wing of greater area, revised undercarriage arrangement and the installation of a 701 kW (940 hp) Gnome-Rhone 14N-0 radial engine with a three-blade constant speed propeller, on 29 September 1937, the MB.150 finally conducted its maiden flight.

Months later, the MB.150.01 was handed over to the Centre d'Essais du Materiel Aerien (CEMA) for service trials; during one such official test flight in December 1937, a maximum recorded speed of 434 km/h (270 mph) was attained. As a result of the CEMA flights, the performance of the prototype was sufficiently interesting as to warrant further development. This brought, at the beginning of 1938, a small increase in the aircraft's wing span, the replacement of the twin wing-mounted radiators by a unit installed between the wheel wells, and the installation of an improved 14N-7 engine, which led to the prototype being re-named MB.150.01M (M standing for modified). During spring 1938, further trials of the modified aircraft were performed by CEMA.

By this point, the declining diplomatic situation between the European powers and the enactment of several urgent re-equipment programmes for the French Air Force, proved favourable for the MB.150. On 15 March 1938, one programme, Plan V, was adopted, calling for the near-unrealistic delivery of 940 modern fighter aircraft to the Air Force within the space of a year. Even the most optimistic projections saw 285 M.S.406 fighters delivered; while the MB.150 was deemed to have not yet completed development, it was decided to include the type within the production.

On 7 April 1938, upon the completion of trials in late spring 1938, the new manufacturing consortium SNCASO received an initial order for a pre-production batch of 25 aircraft which, upon completion of the MB.150's development programme, was followed by the confirmation of a sizable order for 450 aircraft. Three hundred aircraft were to be delivered to the French Air Force by 1 April 1939; this was later cut to 206 aircraft. Only one aircraft had been delivered by the deadline; other aircraft firms failed to meet the tight delivery dates.

=== Further development ===
There was no direct production of the MB-150.01 as the aircraft having been deemed to be unsuitable for mass production. Amongst other changes needed, the structure of the airframe had to be redesigned to suit mass production. During early April 1938, an order was received for three more prototypes; these were to explore the possibilities for installing more powerful engines of both French and American design, such as the Hispano-Suiza 14AA, Pratt & Whitney R-1830 Twin Wasp, and further derivatives of the Gnome-Rhône 14N engine. This design effort led to the production of the MB.151.01 and MB.152.01 prototypes, which were developed and produced in parallel.

The first pre-production prototype, the MB.151.01, was quickly assembled at Courbevoie using the new simplified construction methods. This aircraft, which was fully armed, performed its first flight at Villacoublay Airfield, Île-de-France, on 18 August 1938. According to Christesco, the performance of the MB.151.01 was initially disappointing, leading to efforts to improve its performance. Development and mass production was delayed by the overheating of the engine (resulting in oil cooler types being tested and the most efficient of these adopted) and the aircraft being poorly balanced on its pitch axis at high speeds; neither the prototype nor the production MB.151 were able to attain 480 km/h (300 mph), the design's estimated maximum speed.

According to Christesco, the MB.152.01 was "the first true aircraft" of the series. This model was equipped with a more powerful 1,030 hp (770 kW) Gnome-Rhône 14N-21 engine, capable of a speed of 520 km/h (320 mph) and equipped with a revised armament arrangement. On 15 December 1938, the MB.152.01 prototype performed its maiden flight. During January 1939, it was refitted with a more production-representative 1,000 hp (750 kW) Gnome-Rhône 14N-25 engine; various alternative engine cowlings and propellers were also tested to address engine overheating. To prevent further delays to the production aircraft, a large cowling was adopted, which increased drag and reduced the MB.152's flight performance.

The manufacturing of the fighter was divided amongst the various branches comprising SNCASO. Aside from a handful that were assembled at Courbevoie early on, roughly half of all aircraft produced were manufactured at Châteauroux, Berry while the other half were built at Bordeaux–Merignac, Nouvelle-Aquitaine. From January 1940, production was at Châteauroux alone. During December 1938, the first of the pre-production aircraft were completed; on 7 March 1939, the first production fighter was delivered to the French Air Force. By mid-May 1939, only 22 aircraft, a combination of MB.151s and MB.152s, had been dispatched; of these, only ten had been accepted by the Air Force.

The MB.153 and MB.154 were intended as testbeds for American engines but only the MB.153 flew and when it crashed a few days later was damaged beyond repair, pursuit of these alternatives also ceased. Attention shifted to extending the range of the MB.152 by moving the cockpit aft to make room for a new fuel tank; other modifications included a slightly broader wing and revised aerodynamics around the cowling. The resulting MB.155, performed favourably in flight tests and was ordered into production in 1940 but only ten aircraft had been completed by the Fall of France. Under the terms of the armistice, the remaining 25 on the production line were completed and delivered into Vichy service. From there, some eventually made their way into the Luftwaffe after 1942.

The final member of the family, the MB.157 had a far more powerful engine and eventually became a very different aircraft as the design evolved from the MB.152 to accommodate the larger and heavier 1,590 hp (1,190 kW) Gnome-Rhône 14R-4 motor. Unfinished at the time of the armistice, it was ordered to be completed and flown under German supervision. Demonstrating superb performance, it was taken to Orly where the engine was removed for testing in a wind tunnel. The excellence in the design was confirmed by Germans when they completed and tested it in 1942, reaching up to 710 km/h (440 mph). It was later destroyed in an Allied air raid.

== Operational history ==
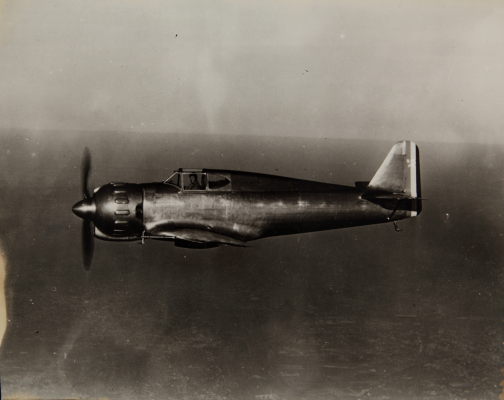
MB.151 in 1939

Upon evaluation, early deliveries were deemed unsuitable for combat operations, principally due to problems with the tailplane; plans were laid for the first 157 production fighters to be stored awaiting modification, while additional production examples were built with the correction. The type was initially confined to performing training duties alone; prior to the outbreak of the Second World War, only one squadron, allocated to the 1st Escadre de Chasse, received the type. Upon the eve of the conflict, around 249 aircraft had been manufactured; of these, roughly 123 aircraft had been accepted by the Armée de l'Air. However, few of these were considered to be flyable, the majority missing their gunsights and propellers.

On 26 September 1939, the first modified MB.152s were delivered to the French Air Force; allocation to active squadrons began by early October and, by mid-November 1939, two Groupes de Chasse (fighter wings) had been equipped with 26 MB.152s each. At this point, the type still demonstrated some unfavourable flight characteristics, such as during steep dives. Increasing numbers of MB.151 aircraft were being delivered to be squadrons for training in advance of their conversion to the MB.152. During the early Phoney War, very few engagements between the MB.152 and the aircraft of the Luftwaffe occurred; in this period, only the shooting-down of a Junkers Ju 88 was recorded.

During the Battle of France, MB.151s and MB.152s equipped nine Groupes de Chasse; the MB.152 was the most numerous aircraft remaining in service during the final weeks prior to the signing of the Armistice of 22 June 1940. They proved to be tough aircraft, able to withstand considerable battle damage, rapidly reach high speeds during a dive and were steady gun platforms. In air combat they were outmatched by the Messerschmitt Bf 109E on almost every count and proved slower than the twin-engined Messerschmitt Bf 110. All Bloch units suffered many losses. In the week of 10 to 17 May, it was almost commonplace for a Bloch squadron to take off with eight or nine aircraft and come back with only two or three. The MB.152 pilots claimed at least 188 enemy aircraft, for the loss of about 86 Blochs. In the third week in May the Bloch units had suffered severe losses and were pulled back to the Paris area to reform.

In comparison with its French contemporaries, according to aviation author Michel Cristesco: "the MB.152 was the least successful in combat and the one that suffered the heaviest losses". The type had numerous shortcomings; these problems included lack of manoeuvrability, unreliable guns, a relatively short range (600 km [370 mi] compared to 660 km (410 mi) for the Bf 109E) and being considerably underpowered. Writing of its faults, Cristesco attributed two major points for its performance shortcomings; its inadequate manoeuvrability and its range.

Following the Armistice, six groups continued to fly in the Vichy French Air Force until this was disbanded on 1 December 1942, the aircraft being passed over to the Royal Romanian Air Force by the Germans. By April 1941, the German Armistice Commission had agreed with a proposal to standardise the Vichy Air Force onto the Dewoitine D.520, resulting in all other single-engine fighters being retired. The Germans seized around 173 fighters, 83 of which being reportedly serviceable, which were pressed into service with the Luftwaffe. Chrisesco alleged that around 95 MB.152s were secretly modified during late 1941 – early 1942 with a rear-fuselage fuel tank, giving them the range to cross the Mediterranean Sea to freedom.

Though the Greek government had ordered 25 MB.151s, only nine had reached Greece by the time of the Armistice. Those that were delivered were still in the process of working up when the Greco-Italian War broke out, leading to the wider Balkan Campaign between the European powers. The MB.151 fighters flew with the 24th Moira Dioxis (Fighter Squadron) of the Hellenic Royal Air Force, stationed at Elefsina against the Italians and Germans, scoring several air-to-air victories until 19 April 1941, when the last Greek MB.151s was shot down. At one stage, the Bulgarian government was in the process of negotiating the acquisition of MB.152 fighters with the Vichy government. During February 1943, a contract for delivery of 20 aircraft was signed, but this was vetoed by the Germans, which by now had a controlling say within Vichy French politics. Bulgaria later received Dewoitine D.520s to meet their needs.

== Variants ==
MB.150
Single MB.150.01 prototype powered by a single Gnome-Rhône 14N-07
MB.151
MB.151.01 prototype and MB.151.C1 initial production versions powered by 920hp Gnome-Rhône 14N-35 engines (144 built)
MB.152
MB.152.01 prototype and MB.152.C1 up-rated production versions produced in parallel with 151.C1, powered by 1,050hp Gnome-Rhône 14N-25 engines. (482 built)
MB.153
Single MB.153.01 prototype with Pratt & Whitney R-1830 Twin Wasp engine
MB.154
Proposed version with Wright R-1820 Cyclone engine. Not built.
MB.155
MB.155.01 prototype converted from a MB.152 and MB.155.C1 production versions powered by Gnome-Rhône 14N-49 engines (35 built)
MB.156
Proposed version with Gnome-Rhône 14R engine. Not built.
MB.157
Single prototype of advanced version, converted from the MB.152 and equipped with a 1,590hp Gnome-Rhône 14R-4 engine.

== Operators ==
France
Armée de l'Air

- Groupe de Chasse I/1
- Groupe de Chasse II/1
- Groupe de Chasse II/6
- Groupe de Chasse I/8
- Groupe de Chasse II/8
- Groupe de Chasse II/9
- Groupe de Chasse III/9
- Groupe de Chasse II/10
- Groupe de Chasse III/10
- Escadrille de Chasse I/55

Aéronavale

- Escadrille AC2
- Escadrille AC3

Nazi Germany
Luftwaffe

- EJG 26 (at Cognac)
- JG 103 (at Bad Aibling)
- Jagdlehrer Staffel (at Guyancourt-Orange)

Greece
Royal Hellenic Air Force

- 24th Pursuit Squadron

Poland
Polish Air Forces in exile in France

- I/145 Polish Fighter Squadron Varsovie

Kingdom of Romania
Royal Romanian Air Force
Vichy France
Armée de l'Air de l'Armistice

- Groupe de Chasse I/1 (at Lyon-Bron, reserve unit)
- Groupe de Chasse II/1 (at Luc)
- Groupe de Chasse I/8 (at Montpellier-Fréjorgues)
- Groupe de Chasse II/8 (at Marignane)
- Groupe de Chasse II/9 (at Aulnat, reserve unit)
- Groupe de Chasse III/9 (at Salon-de-Provence)
- Groupe de Chasse I/13 (at Nîmes-Garons)
- Groupe de Chasse III/13 (at Nîmes-Garons)

United Kingdom
Royal Air Force

- Following the Battle of France Polish ace pilot Zdzislaw Henneberg and his two wingmen flew their MB.152C.1s to England, the aircraft were repainted in RAF roundels and used briefly for local air defence and technical evaluation before being grounded due to a lack of spares.

== Specifications (MB.152C.1) ==
Bloch MB.152 3-view drawings

Data from Aircraft of the Third Reich;French Fighters of World War Two; French Aircraft from 1939 to 1942

General characteristics

- Crew: 1
- Length: 9.1 m (29 ft 10 in)
- Wingspan: 10.54 m (34 ft 7 in)
- Height: 3.03 m (9 ft 11 in)
- Wing area: 17.32 m^{2} (186.4 sq ft)
- Empty weight: 2,158 kg (4,758 lb)
- Gross weight: 2,693 kg (5,937 lb)
- Max takeoff weight: 2,800 kg (6,173 lb)
- Powerplant: 1 × Gnome-Rhône 14N-25 14-cyl. two-row air-cooled radial piston engine, 805 kW (1,080 hp)

or 1 × Gnome-Rhône 14N-49 engine rated at 820 kW (1,100 hp)

- Propellers: 3-bladed variable-pitch propeller

Performance

- Maximum speed: 509 km/h (316 mph, 275 kn)
- Cruise speed: 450 km/h (280 mph, 240 kn)
- Range: 600 km (370 mi, 320 nmi)
- Service ceiling: 10,000 m (33,000 ft)
- Time to altitude: 2,000 m (6,600 ft) in 3 minutes 24 seconds
- Wing loading: 155.4 kg/m^{2} (31.8 lb/sq ft)
- Power/mass: 0.182 hp/lb (0.299 kW/kg)

Armament

- 2 × 20 mm Hispano-Suiza HS.404 cannon with 60-round drum magazines
- 2 × 7.5 mm (0.295 in) MAC 1934 M39 machine guns with 500 rpg

or

- 4 × 7.5 mm (0.295 in) MAC 1934 M39 machine guns with 500 rpg

== See also ==
Aircraft of comparable role, configuration, and era

- CAC Boomerang
- Curtiss P-36 Hawk
- Curtiss-Wright CW-21
- Fiat G.50
- Grumman F4F Wildcat
- IAR 80
- Macchi C.200
- MÁVAG Héja
- Mitsubishi A6M Zero
- Morane Saulnier MS 406
- Nakajima Ki-43
- Polikarpov I-180
- PZL.50
- Reggiane Re.2000
- Seversky P-35
- Weiss Manfréd WM-23 Ezüst Nyíl

Related lists

- List of aircraft of the French Air Force during World War II
- List of military aircraft of France
- List of fighter aircraft
- List of aircraft of World War II
