= Bloch MB.170 =

1938 bomber aircraft family by Avion Marcel Bloch

MB.170
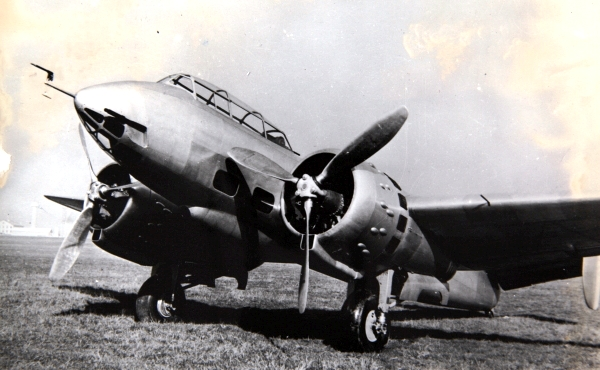

General information
- Type: Reconnaissance bomber
- Manufacturer: Société des Avions Marcel Bloch
- Primary users: Armée de l'Air (French Air Force) Aéronavale (French Navy); Luftwaffe

History
- Introduction date: March 1940 (M.174)
- First flight: July 1939 (M.174)
- Retired: 1960

The Bloch MB.170 and its derivatives were French reconnaissance bombers designed and built shortly before the Second World War. They were the best aircraft of this type available to the Armée de l'Air at the outbreak of the war, with speed, altitude and manoeuvrability that allowed them to evade interception by the German fighters. Although the aircraft could have been in service by 1937, debate over what role to give the aircraft delayed deliveries until 1940.

Too few in number to affect the Battle of France, they continued in service with the Vichy forces after the Armistice of 22 June 1940. The MB.174 is notable as the aircraft flown by Antoine de Saint-Exupéry, author of The Little Prince during the campaign. His work Pilote de Guerre (Flight to Arras), published in 1942, is based on a 1940 reconnaissance mission in this type of aircraft.

Production of the type recommenced after the war as the SNCASO SO.175, with the final examples remaining in French service until 1960.

== Design and development ==
In 1936, the Ministry for the Air initiated a programme of modernisation of French aviation which included a request concerning a two- or three-seat multi-role aircraft that could be used as a light-bomber or attack aircraft or for reconnaissance. A design team at the former Bloch factory at Courbevoie (which had recently become part of the nationalised SNCASO), led by Henri Deplante, proposed the MB.170, a twin-engined, low-winged cantilever monoplane.

The first prototype, the MB 170 AB2-A3 No.01, equipped as a two-seat attack bomber or a three-seat reconnaissance aircraft, made its maiden flight on 15 February 1938. It was powered by two 720 kW (970 hp) Gnome-Rhône 14N radial engines and was armed with a 20 mm Hispano-Suiza cannon in the nose, two 7.5 mm MAC 1934 machine guns in the wing, with another machine gun flexibly mounted in the rear cockpit, with a ventral cupola housing either a rearward firing machine gun or a camera. The second prototype, the MB 170 B3 No.2 was a three seat bomber, with the ventral cupola removed, a revised canopy and larger tail fins. After many modifications it became the definitive MB.174.

After the 50th example was delivered in May 1940, the MB.175 succeeded the MB.174 on the assembly lines in full flow. This bomber version, had a redesigned bomb bay capable of carrying bombs of 100–200 kg (220-440 lb), where the MB.174 was limited to 50 kg (110 lb) bombs. The MB.175's fuselage was lengthened and widened to accommodate this greater capacity but only 25 were delivered before the armistice. They were eventually used in the same reconnaissance units as the MB.174s.

The MB.176 was a version with Pratt & Whitney R-1830 radials which proved to have poorer performance than the MB.175. It was ordered into production to ease demand on the French engine manufacturers. However, the availability of the American engines proved to be difficult, and only five aircraft were completed before the armistice. Around another 200 airframes were at various stages of construction.

The MB.177 version was powered by Hispano-Suiza 12Y31 engines, which required extensive redesign of the engine frames. Unfortunately, the engines proved to be underpowered and unsuitable. A final MB.178 variant was under construction at the time of the Armistice. The captured airframe was taken away to Rechlin.

Production of the MB.175 version recommenced under the German occupation, with the aircraft exported to Germany for use by the Luftwaffe as trainers.

After the war, SNCASO resumed production of the MB.175 for the Aéronavale as a torpedo bomber designated MB.175T (later SO.175T)

== Operational history ==
The Bloch MB.174 flew for the first time in July 1939 and entered service in March 1940 with strategic reconnaissance units where it replaced the Potez 637 that had proved too vulnerable during the Phoney war. Its first operational mission was flown by the famed pilot and writer, Capitaine Antoine de Saint-Exupéry, of Groupe de Reconnaissance II/33, on 29 March 1940. The Bloch 174 appeared extremely effective in these missions as its speed and manoeuvrability at altitude allowed it to escape from most modern Luftwaffe fighters. Only three examples were lost to enemy fire during the Battle of France. Like the majority of the modern equipment of the Armée de l'Air during the campaign, they were too little and too late. At the time of the armistice, most surviving MB.174s and 175s had been evacuated to North Africa. A few were recovered by the Germans and then used for pilot training. During the Vichy period, MB.174s frequently flew over Gibraltar to monitor the British fleet.

In March 1941, German engineers used engines taken from MB.175s (as well as other captured aircraft) to propel the Messerschmitt Me 323 cargo aircraft, some of which flew with parts taken from completed MB.175s. After Operation Torch, French forces defected again from Vichy back to the Allies and surviving examples of the MB.170 flew their final combat missions during the Battle of Tunisia. They were replaced by reconnaissance variants of the P-38 Lightning and used as transports and target tugs.

The post-war MB.175T/SO.175T was built in a small series commencing in 1945 and served until 1960. The final examples were used as trainers.

== Variants ==
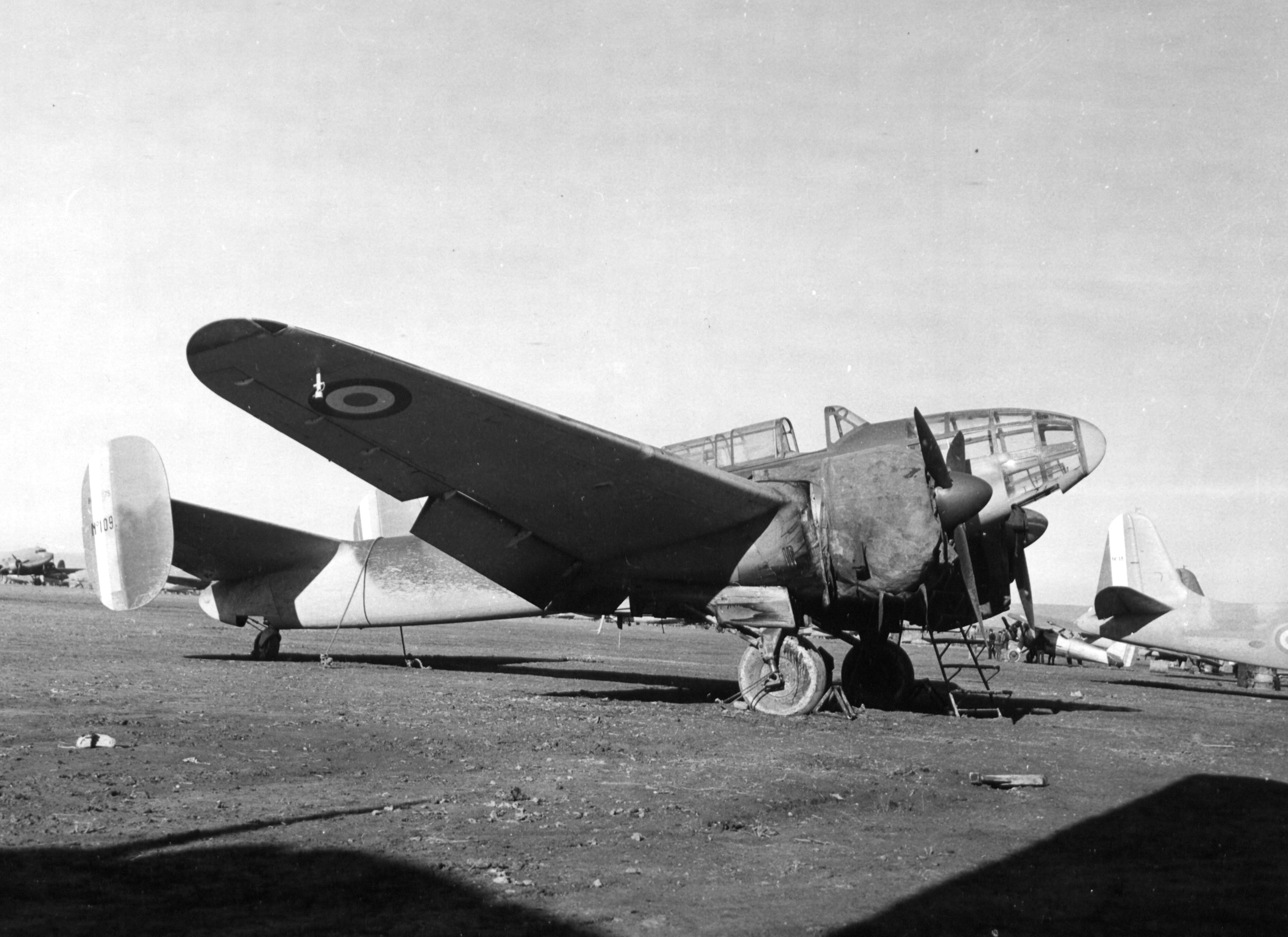
Bloch MB.175

MB.170
MB.170.01 - The first prototype, equipped as reconnaissance aircraft, powered by Gnome-Rhône 14N-06 engines.
MB.170.02 - The second prototype, equipped as light bomber, powered by Gnome-Rhône 14N-06 engines.
MB.171
MB.172
MB.173
MB.174
MB.174.01 - The original MB.174 prototype, powered by Gnome-Rhône 14N-49 engines.
MB.174A.3 - Original production version, powered by Gnome-Rhône 14N-49 engines.. 56 built

MB.175
MB.175.01 - The original MB.175 prototype, powered by Gnome-Rhône 14N-48 engines.
MB.175B.3 - Second production version. 23 built, plus 56 unarmed aircraft for the Luftwaffe, powered by Gnome-Rhône 14N-48 engines.
MB.175T
also known as SO.175T; post-war torpedo bomber version for the Aéronavale. 80 built.
MB.176
MB.176.01 - The original MB.176 prototype, powered by two Pratt & Whitney R-1830 SC 3-G Twin Wasp engines.
MB.176B.3 - Production version. 5 built
MB.177
Single prototype, powered by two Hispano-Suiza 12Y-31 inline engines.
MB.178
Further development, construction halted by arrival of German forces.

== Operators ==
France

- French Air Force ( Groupes de Reconnaissance 1/33, 2/33, 1/52 and 2/36)
- French Navy (6 F squadron, 10 S squadron, Rochefort training school)

Vichy France

- Vichy French Air Force

Nazi Germany

- Luftwaffe (captured)

== Specifications (MB.174A.3) ==
Bloch MB.170 schematics

Data from War Planes of the Second World War: Bombers and Reconnaissance Aircraft Vol VII

General characteristics

- Crew: 3
- Length: 12.23 m (40 ft 1 in)
- Wingspan: 17.92 m (58 ft 10 in)
- Height: 3.55 m (11 ft 8 in)
- Wing area: 38 m^{2} (410 sq ft)
- Empty weight: 5,612 kg (12,372 lb)
- Gross weight: 7,175 kg (15,818 lb)
- Powerplant: 2 × Gnome-Rhône 14N 14-cylinder air-cooled radial piston engine, 772 kW (1,035 hp) each
- Propellers: 3-bladed variable-pitch propellers

Performance

- Maximum speed: 530 km/h (330 mph, 290 kn) at 5,200 m (17,060 ft)
- Cruise speed: 460 km/h (290 mph, 250 kn) at 4,000 m (13,120 ft)
- Range: 1,650 km (1,030 mi, 890 nmi)
- Service ceiling: 11,000 m (36,000 ft)
- Time to altitude: 8,000 m (26,250 ft) in 11 minutes

Armament

- Guns: 2 × fixed, forward-firing 7.5 mm (.295 in) MAC 1934 machine guns in the wings
  - 2 × 7.5 mm MAC 1934s in the dorsal position
  - 3 × 7.5 mm MAC 1934s on aft-firing mounts
- Bombs: 400 kg (880 lb) of bombs, usually 8 × 50 kg (110 lb) or 16 × 22 kg (49 lb) bombs internally plus 6 × 22 kg (49 lb) bombs or flares under-wing (As an alternative, 175 illumination bombs carried internally plus 6 × 22 kg (49 lb) bombs or flares under-wing for night photographic missions.)

== See also ==
Aircraft of comparable role, configuration, and era

- Bristol Beaufighter
- Caproni Ca.311
- Douglas F-3
- Dornier Do 215
- Martin Maryland
- Mitsubishi Ki-46
- Petlyakov Pe-2
- Potez 630
- PZL.37 Łoś
- Tupolev SB

Related lists

- List of aircraft of World War II
- List of aircraft of the French Air Force during World War II
- List of bomber aircraft
