= Bloch MB.800 =

1940s French aircraft

MB.800

General information
- Type: trainer
- Manufacturer: Bloch
- Number built: 1

History
- First flight: 18 December 1940

The Bloch MB.800 was a French low-wing monoplane three-seat trainer / mailplane developed by Société des Avions Marcel Bloch. It was of all-wood construction.

== Variants ==
Data from: Dassault Aviation

MB 800 P3
the first aircraft, a three-seat flying trainer to a P3 specification, powered by two 180 hp (130 kW) Bloch 6B-1 6-cylinder engines.
MB 800 T3
the second aircraft, a three-seat crew trainer to a T3 specification, was under construction in 1939.
MB 800P 'Biarritz'
the third aircraft, a mailplane, completed during WWII as the Sud-Ouest SO.80 / Sud-Ouest SO.800, powered by two 350 hp (260 kW) Béarn 6D engines.

== Specifications ==
Data from

General characteristics

- Crew: 3
- Length: 8.60 m (28 ft 3 in)
- Wingspan: 11.54 m (37 ft 10 in)
- Height: 2.50 m (8 ft 2 in)
- Wing area: 19.00 m^{2} (204.5 sq ft)
- Empty weight: 1,395 kg (3,075 lb)
- Gross weight: 1,987 kg (4,381 lb)
- Powerplant: 2 × Bloch 6B-1 6-cyl. inverted air-cooled in-line piston engines, 130 kW (180 hp) each
- Propellers: 3-bladed Ratier variable-pitch propellers

Performance

- Maximum speed: 338 km/h (210 mph, 183 kn)
- Service ceiling: 6,500 m (21,300 ft)
