= Bloch MB.110 =

1930s French aircraft

MB.110

General information
- Type: Mailplane
- National origin: France
- Manufacturer: Société des Avions Marcel Bloch
- Designer: Pineau & Marcel Riffard
- Number built: 1

History
- First flight: 12 June 1933

The Bloch MB.110 was a mailplane designed and built in France in the early 1930s. It was a high-wing monoplane of all-metal construction.

== Specifications ==
Data from

General characteristics

- Crew: 3
- Length: 10.20 m (33 ft 6 in)
- Wingspan: 12.90 m (42 ft 4 in)
- Height: 3 m (9 ft 10 in)
- Empty weight: 1,050 kg (2,315 lb)
- Gross weight: 1,600 kg (3,527 lb)
- Powerplant: 1 × Gnome & Rhône 7Kb 7-cyl. air-cooled radial piston engines, 220 kW (300 hp)
- Propellers: 2-bladed fixed-pitch metal propellers

Performance

- Maximum speed: 210 km/h (130 mph, 110 kn)
- Service ceiling: 7,300 m (24,000 ft)
- Wing loading: 61 kg/m^{2} (12 lb/sq ft)
