= Bloch MB.500 =

1930s French aircraft

MB.500

General information
- Type: trainer
- Manufacturer: Bloch
- Number built: 1

History
- First flight: June 1938

The Bloch MB.500 was a French low-wing monoplane trainer developed by Société des Avions Marcel Bloch.

== Specifications (MB.500) ==
Data from

General characteristics

- Crew: 3
- Length: 11.54 m (37 ft 10 in)
- Wingspan: 15.75 m (51 ft 8 in)
- Height: 3.65 m (12 ft 0 in)
- Powerplant: 2 × Lorraine 9Na Algol 9-cyl. two-row air-cooled piston engines, 220 kW (300 hp) each
- Propellers: 3-bladed Ratier variable-pitch propellers

Performance
