= Gnome-Rhône 14N =

1930s French piston aircraft engine

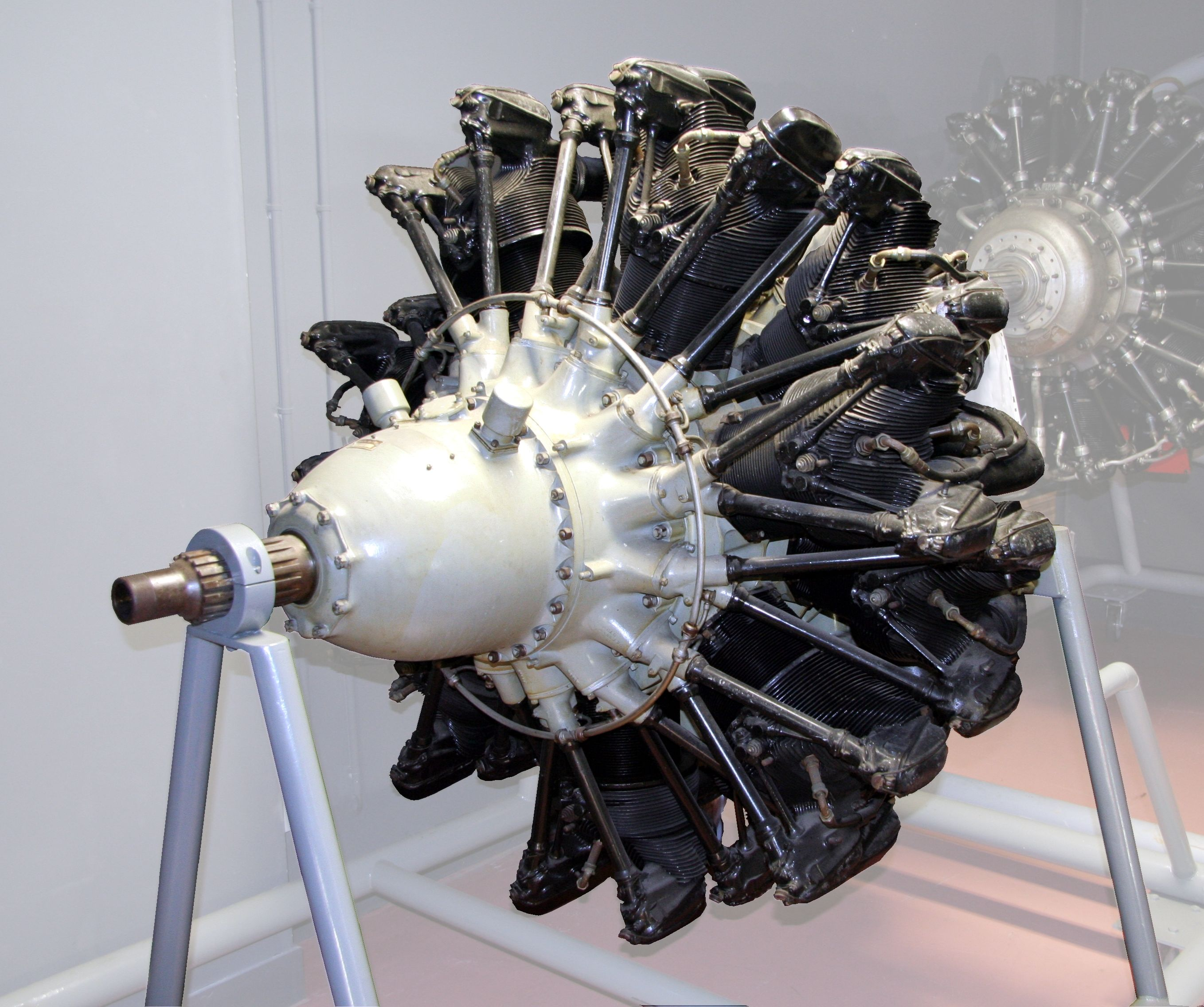
- Type: Radial engine
- National origin: France
- Manufacturer: Gnome et Rhône
- First run: 1937
- Major applications: Bloch MB.150; Messerschmitt Me 323; Amiot 351; Lioré et Olivier LeO 45
- Developed from: Gnome-Rhône 14K Mistral Major
- Developed into: Gnome-Rhône 14M, Gnome-Rhône 14R

The Gnome-Rhône 14N was a 14-cylinder two-row air-cooled radial engine designed and manufactured by Gnome-Rhône just before the start of World War II. A development of the Gnome-Rhône 14K, the 14N was used on several French and even one German aircraft.

== Design and development ==
The 14K's reliability was poor, so Gnome-Rhône carried out major redesign, using different materials for the pistons and valves, and enlarging the cooling fins to increase surface area by 39%.

The 14N was introduced in 1937 and was quickly installed on several aircraft models. In 1939, minor improvements allowed Gnome-Rhône to increase the compression ratio from 6.1:1 to 6.8:1, which increased power.

The 14N was further developed into the Gnome-Rhône 14R featuring a 2-stage supercharger, but this type was not widely used until after World War II as production of improved engines was restricted by the armistice with Germany.

== Variants ==
Data from:Aircraft engines of the World 1945, Aircraft engines of the World 1946

- 14N-2: Left hand (LH) rotation, 780 kW (1,050 hp)
- 14N-3: Right hand (RH) rotation version of N-2
- 14N-10: LH rotation, 680 kW (910 hp)
- 14N-11: RH rotation version of N-10
- 14N-16: LH rotation, 697 kW (935 hp)
- 14N-17: RH rotation version of N-16
- 14N-20: LH rotation, 846 kW (1,135 hp)
- 14N-21: RH rotation version of N-20
- 14N-44: LH rotation, 780 kW (1,050 hp)
- 14N-45: RH rotation version of N-44
- 14N-48: LH rotation, 880 kW (1,180 hp)
- 14N-49: RH rotation version of N-48
- 14N-50: LH rotation, 1,000 kW (1,400 hp)
- 14N-54: LH rotation, 930 kW (1,250 hp)
- 14N-55: RH rotation version of N-54
- 14N-58: LH rotation, 880 kW (1,180 hp)
- 14N-59: RH rotation version of N-58

== Applications ==
- Amiot 351 (1 × 14N-38 + 1 × 14N-39)
- Amiot 354 (1 × 14N-48 + 1 × 14N-49)
- Bloch MB.131 (1 × 14N-10 + 1 × 14N-11)
- Bloch MB.135 (2 × 14M-4 + 2 × 14M-5)
- Bloch MB.150 (14N-7)
- Bloch MB.151 (14N-35)
- Bloch MB.152 (14N-25)
- Bloch MB.155 (14N-49)
- Bloch MB.161 (2 × 14N-38 + 2 × 14N-39)
- Bloch MB.170 (2 × 14N-6)
- Bloch MB.174 (2 × 14N-49)
- Bloch MB.175 (2 × 14N-48)
- Bloch MB.210 (1 × 14N-10 + 1 × 14N-11)
- Bloch MB.220 (1 × 14N-16 + 1 × 14N-17)
- Bloch MB.300 Pacifique (2 × 14N-16 + 1 × 14N-17)
- Dewoitine D.342 (2 × 14N-16 + 1 × 14N-17)
- Farman F.222.2 (4 × 14N-11)
- Farman F.224 (4 × 14N-1)
- Latécoère 611 (prototype) (2 × 14N-30 +2 × 14N-31 )
- Lioré et Olivier LeO 451 (14N-48 + 14N-49
  or 14N-38 + 14N-39 or 14N-46 + 14N-47)
- Sud-Est SE.161 Languedoc (2 × 14N-44 + 2 × 14N-45 )
- Messerschmitt Me 323 (various)
- Koolhoven F.K.58A (14N-16)
- PZL P.24F and G (14N-7)
- PZL P.24H (14N-21)
- PZL.43 (14N-1)
- SNCAO CAO.700 (4 × 14N-49)
- SNCASE SE.100 (1 × 14N-20 + 1 × 14N-21)

== Specifications (14N-48) ==
Data from Aircraft engines of the World 1945

=== General characteristics ===
- Type: Fourteen-cylinder two-row air-cooled piston engine
- Bore: 146 mm (5.75 in)
- Stroke: 165 mm (6.50 in)
- Displacement: 38.67 L (2,360 cu in)
- Length: 1,480 mm (58.27 in)
- Diameter: 1,290 mm (50.79 in)
- Dry weight: 620 kg (1,370 lb)

=== Components ===
- Valvetrain: Two inlet and two exhaust overhead valves per cylinder
- Supercharger: Single-stage single-speed centrifugal type supercharger
- Fuel system: Stromberg carburetor
- Fuel type: 87 octane rating gasoline
- Oil system: Pressure fed at 480 kPa (70 psi)
- Cooling system: Air-cooled
- Reduction gear: 0.5:1 planetary reduction gearing

=== Performance ===
- Power output:
- Take-off: 880 kW (1,180 hp) at 2,650 rpm
- Military: 790 kW (1,060 hp) at 2,400 rpm at 3,900 m (12,800 ft)
- Cruise: 630 kW (850 hp) at 2,100 rpm at 3,900 m (12,800 ft)
- Specific power: 22.45 kW/L (0.49 hp/in^{3})
- Compression ratio: 6.8:1
- Power-to-weight ratio: 1.4 kW/kg (0.85 hp/lb)

== See also ==
- Pratt & Whitney R-1830 a comparable engine sometimes fitted as an alternative to the 14N on French designs
- BMW 801
- Bristol Hercules
- Bristol Taurus
- Fiat A.74
- Mitsubishi Kinsei
- Nakajima Sakae
- Piaggio P.XIX
- Shvetsov ASh-82
- Tumansky M-88
- Wright R-2600
