= Bloch MB.210 =

1934 bomber aircraft family by Avions Marcel Bloch

MB.210 / MB.211
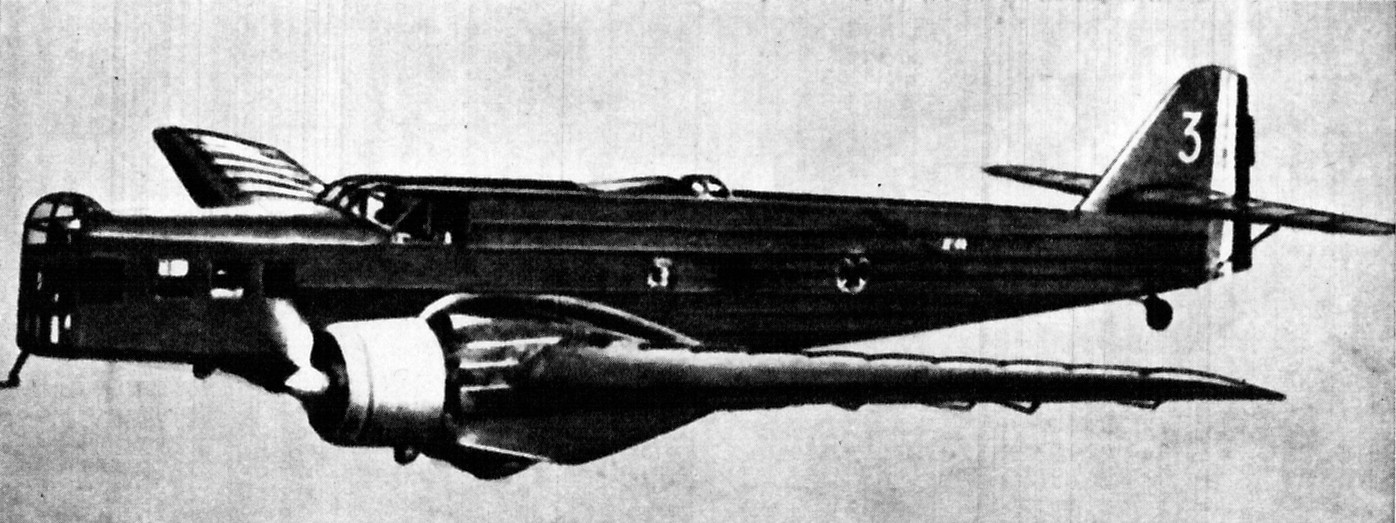
- An MB.210

General information
- Type: Bomber
- Manufacturer: Société des Avions Marcel Bloch
- Built by: Various, including: Les Mureaux; Potez-CAMS; Breguet; Hanriot; Renault
- Status: retired
- Primary user: French Air Force
- Number built: < 300

History
- Introduction date: November 1936
- First flight: 23 November 1934
- Retired: around 1945
- Developed from: Bloch MB.200

The Bloch MB.210 and MB.211 were the successors of the French Bloch MB.200 bomber developed by Société des Avions Marcel Bloch in the 1930s and differed primarily in being low wing monoplanes rather than high wing monoplanes.

== Development ==
The MB.210 derived from the MB.200 and differs in particular by having its cantilever wing set at the bottom of the fuselage, and in having a retractable undercarriage. Developed as a private venture, the prototype MB.210 accomplished its first flight on 23 November 1934, powered by two 596 kW (800 hp) Gnome-Rhône 14Kdrs / Gnome-Rhône 14Kgrs air-cooled radial engines and having a fixed undercarriage. This was followed by a second prototype, the MB.211 Verdun, powered by 641 kW (860 hp) Hispano-Suiza 12Y V-12 liquid-cooled inlines and fitted with a retractable undercarriage, this flying on 29 August 1935. Initial flight testing of this version was somewhat disappointing, so no further examples were built. Further progress with the MB.210, however, convinced the Armée de l'Air to order series production, the first example of which flew on 12 December 1936.

The satisfaction did not last very long, however, since it was underpowered and the engines of production aircraft were inclined to overheating. The type was grounded until its engines could be replaced by the more powerful and reliable Gnome-Rhône 14N, these engines first being tested in summer 1937 and had to be replaced. Altogether, 257 units were manufactured amongst companies as diverse as Les Mureaux over Potez-CAMS, Breguet, Hanriot, and Renault.

== Operational history ==
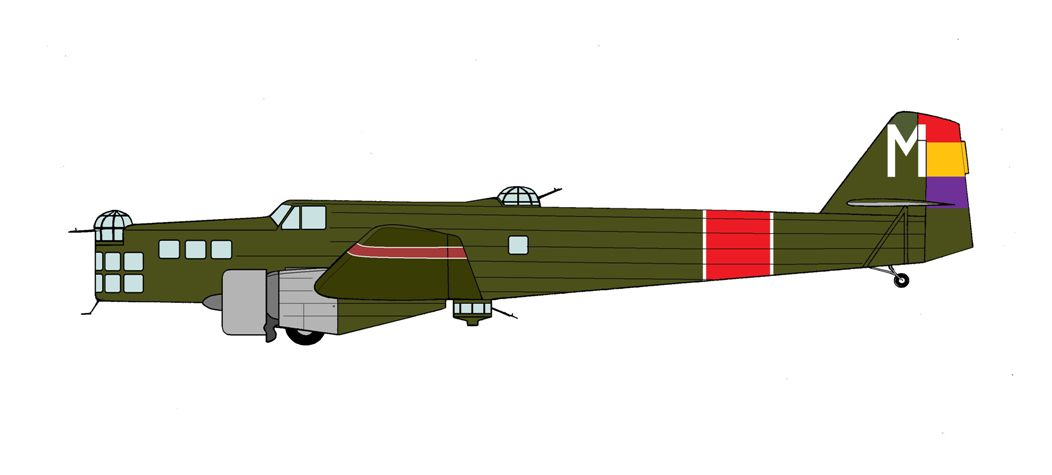
Bloch MB.210 of the Spanish Republican Air Force

In September 1939, the Bloch MB.210 equipped 12 bomber units of the Armée de l'Air. At the time of Nazi Germany's attack on France in spring 1940, these squadrons were in the middle of a restructuring aimed at removing outdated aircraft from the front line. Up to the armistice on 25 June of the same year, the MB.210 was used still for nighttime bombing missions and shifted then to North Africa.

== Variants ==
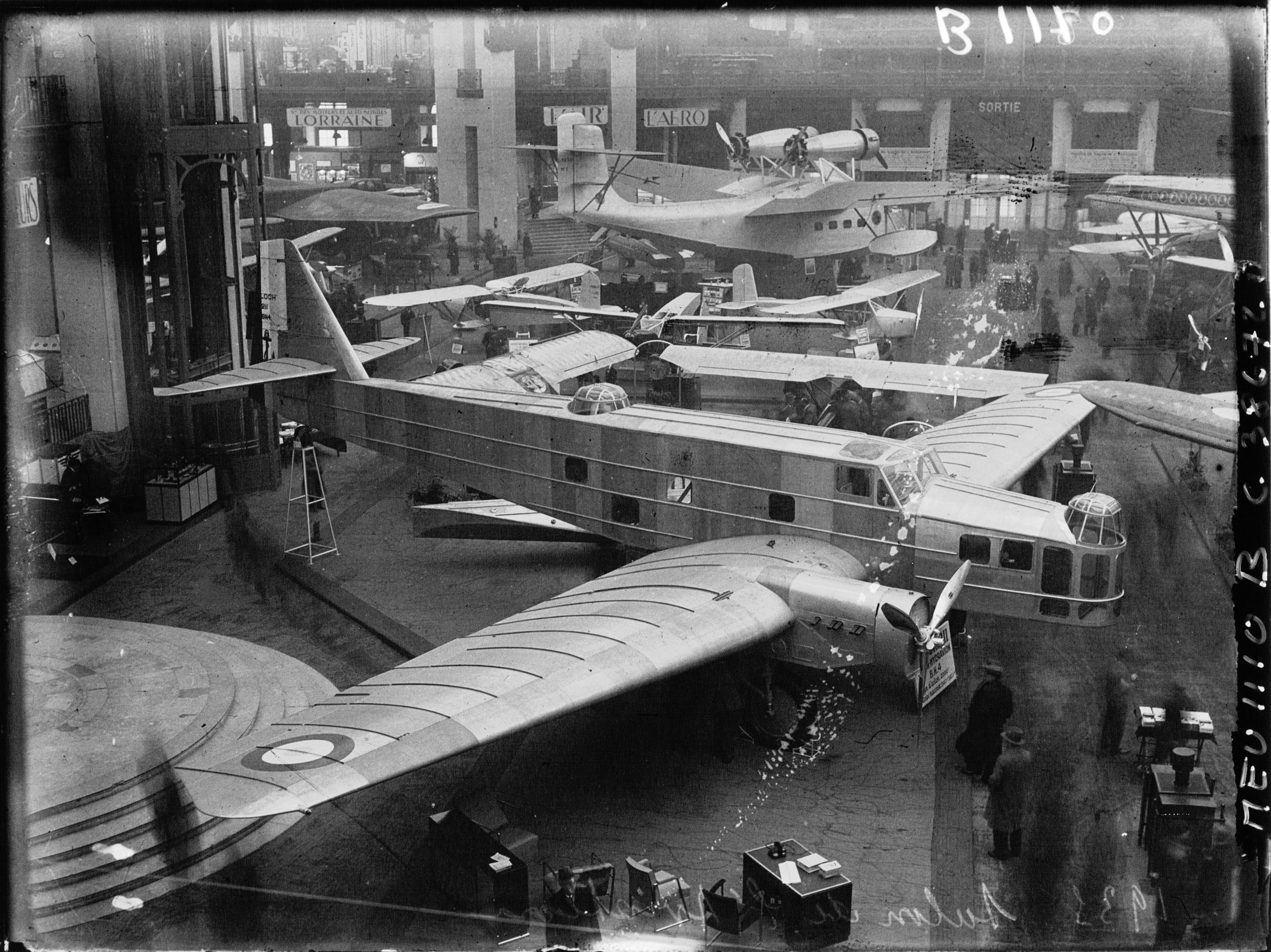
MB.211 prototype at the 1934 Paris Air Show

MB.210.01
First prototype, powered by 2× 596 kW (800 hp) Gnome-Rhône 14Kdrs / Gnome-Rhône 14Kgrs air-cooled radial engines

MB.210Bn.4
Initial production version, powered by 2× Gnome-Rhône 14N-10 / Gnome-Rhône 14N-11 radial engines

MB.210Bn.5
Hanriot-built variant with extra crew member

MB.210H
Floatplane version powered by 2× Gnome-Rhône 14Kirs engines

MB.211.01
Prototype equipped with two 641 kW (860 hp) Hispano-Suiza 12Y inline engines

MB.212
project

MB.218
project

== Operators ==
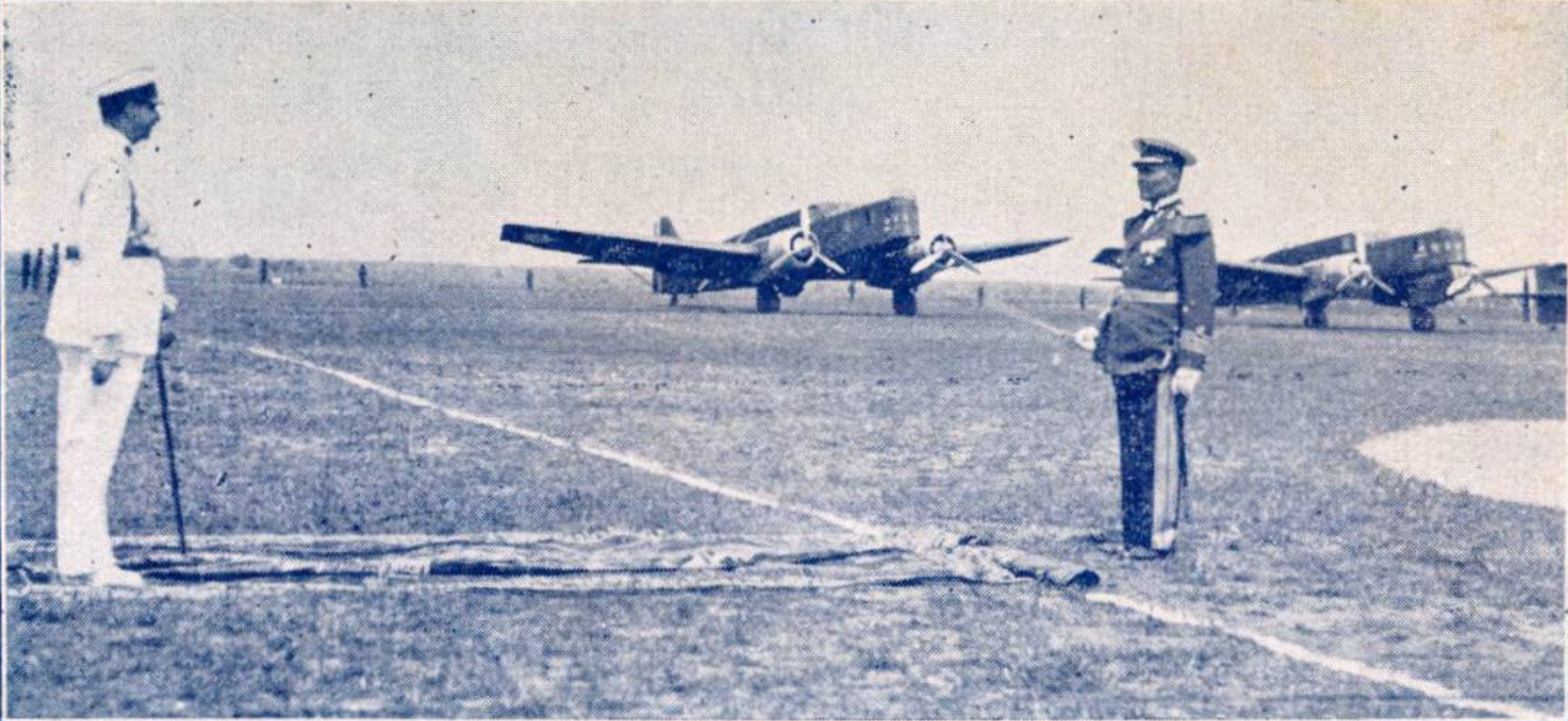
Bloch MB.210s in service with Romania in 1937

Bulgaria
Bulgarian Air Force – Received six aircraft from Germany.
France

- French Air Force
- French Navy

Germany
Luftwaffe – Used briefly for training in 1942 after the German occupation of France
Romania
Royal Romanian Air Force – Received 10 from an order of 24.
Spain
Spanish Republican Air Force received at least three aircraft.

== Specifications (MB.210Bn.5) ==
A Bloch 210 in flight

Data from War Planes of the Second World War: Volume Seven

General characteristics

- Crew: 5
- Length: 18.83 m (61 ft 9 in)
- Wingspan: 22.82 m (74 ft 10 in)
- Height: 6.7 m (22 ft 0 in)
- Wing area: 62.5 m^{2} (673 sq ft)
- Empty weight: 6,413 kg (14,138 lb)
- Gross weight: 9,720 kg (21,429 lb)
- Max takeoff weight: 10,221 kg (22,533 lb)
- Powerplant: 1 × Gnome-Rhône 14N-10 14-cylinder air-cooled radial engine, 709 kW (950 hp) LH rotation
- Powerplant: 1 × Gnome-Rhône 14N-11 14-cylinder air-cooled radial engine, 709 kW (950 hp) RH rotation
- Propellers: 3-bladed variable-pitch propellers (LH and RH rotation)

Performance

- Maximum speed: 322 km/h (200 mph, 174 kn) at 3,500 m (11,500 ft)
- Cruise speed: 240 km/h (150 mph, 130 kn) econ. at 3,500 m (11,500 ft)
- Range: 1,700 km (1,100 mi, 920 nmi)
- Service ceiling: 9,900 m (32,500 ft)
- Time to altitude: 4,000 m (13,000 ft) in 12 minutes
- Wing loading: 156 kg/m^{2} (32 lb/sq ft)
- Power/mass: 0.15 kW/kg (0.091 hp/lb)

Armament

- Guns: 3 × 7.5 mm (.295 in) MAC 1934 machine guns (one in nose, dorsal and ventral turrets)
- Bombs: 1,600 kg (3,520 lb) of bombs

== See also ==
Related development

- MB.200

Related lists

- List of aircraft of the French Air Force during World War II
- List of aircraft of the Spanish Republican Air Force
- List of aircraft of World War II
- List of bomber aircraft
- List of interwar military aircraft

== Bibliography ==
- Green, William (1967). War Planes of the Second World War: Bombers and Reconnaissance Aircraft; Australia, Belgium, Bohemia-Moravia, Bulgaria, Canada, Finland, France. Vol. VII. London: Macdonald. OCLC 369132578.
