= Bloch MB.300 Pacifique =

1930s French airliner prototype

MB.300 Pacifique
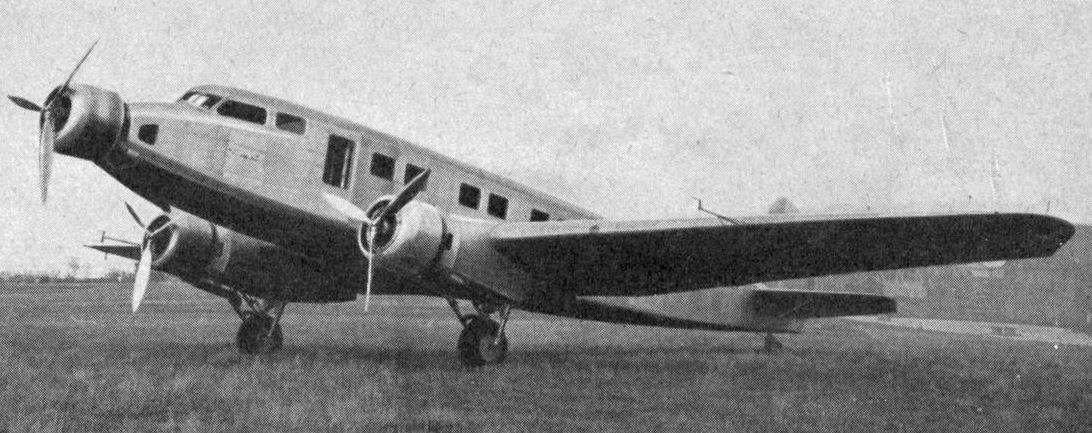

General information
- Type: Civil Airliner
- Manufacturer: Société des Avions Marcel Bloch
- Status: abandoned
- Primary user: Air France
- Number built: 1

History
- First flight: 1935

The Bloch MB.300 Pacifique (a.k.a. La Grosse Julie, "Big Julie") was a French all-metal three-engine monoplane that was developed as an airliner for Air France. A single prototype was produced by Société des Avions Marcel Bloch in 1935, and was eventually rejected by Air France in 1938 in favour of the Dewoitine D.620.

== Design and development ==
The first flight was made in mid-November, 1935 at the Villacoublay airfield which led to the prototype (then temporarily registered as F-AONB pending its airworthiness certificate being issued) undergoing a series of modifications in early 1936 then again in March 1937 which reduced the wingspan and increased the size of the tail while the number of passengers was reduced from 30 to 24. After the certificate of airworthiness was issued, the sole prototype was registered as F-AOUI.

Testing by Air France lasted until January 1938, when it was definitively rejected for service, despite ownership of the aircraft having been transferred to Air France. Its fate is unknown and was probably scrapped, but according to a report of questionable reliability, it may have been delivered to Spain.

== Specifications ==
Data from Jane's All the World's Aircraft 1938

General characteristics

- Crew: 4
- Capacity: 27 passengers daytime, 12 passenger sleeper or 4,580 kg (10,100 lb) payload
- Length: 24.9 m (81 ft 8 in)
- Wingspan: 25.9 m (85 ft 0 in)
- Height: 6.75 m (22 ft 2 in)
- Wing area: 100 m^{2} (1,100 sq ft)
- Empty weight: 9,000 kg (19,842 lb)
- Gross weight: 13,580 kg (29,939 lb)
- Powerplant: 2 × Gnome-Rhône 14N-16 14-cyl. two-row air-cooled piston engines, 682 kW (915 hp) each at 1,750 m (5,741 ft)
  (left hand rotation)
- Powerplant: 1 × Gnome-Rhône 14N-17 14-cyl. two-row air-cooled piston engines, 682 kW (915 hp) at 1,750 m (5,740 ft)
  (right hand rotation)
- Propellers: 3-bladed variable-pitch airscrews

Performance

- Maximum speed: 350 km/h (220 mph, 190 kn) at 2,200 m (7,200 ft)
- Minimum control speed: 100 km/h (62 mph, 54 kn)
- Landing speed: 75 km/h (47 mph; 40 kn)
- Range: 1,000 km (620 mi, 540 nmi)
- Service ceiling: 8,000 m (26,000 ft)

== See also ==
Related development

- Bloch MB.220

Aircraft of comparable role, configuration, and era

- Dewoitine D.620
- Focke-Wulf Fw 200 Condor
