= Bloch MB.131 =

1938 bomber aircraft model by Marcel Bloch

MB.131
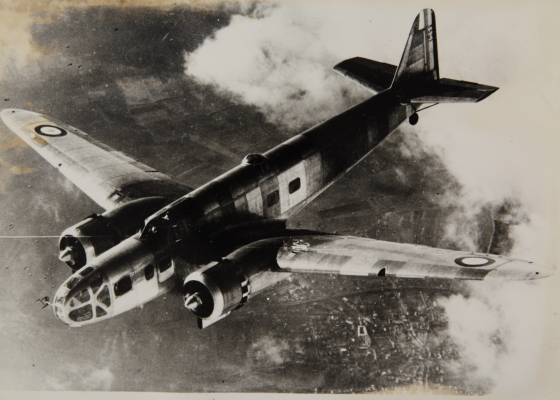

General information
- Type: Reconnaissance-bomber
- Manufacturer: Bloch / SNCASO
- Primary users: French Air Force Polish Air Force; Luftwaffe
- Number built: 143

History
- Introduction date: June 1938
- First flight: 29 June 1934 (MB.130); 16 August 1936 (MB.131)

The Bloch MB.130 and its derivatives were a series of French monoplane reconnaissance-bombers developed during the 1930s. They saw some limited action at the beginning of World War II but were obsolete by that time and suffered badly against the Luftwaffe. After the fall of France, a few were pressed into Luftwaffe service.

== Design and development ==
The MB.130 was developed after the August 1933 French Aviation Ministry request for a reconnaissance and tactical bomber. It was an all-metal, twin-engine, low-wing monoplane with retractable landing gear, armed with three flexible machine guns, one each in the nose, dorsal turret, and ventral gondola. It first flew on 29 June 1934 and despite very ordinary performance, soon entered production, forty machines being ordered in October 1935. An improved version, the MB.131 was first flown on 16 August 1936 but still needed more work to overcome its deficiencies. The radically revised second prototype which flew on 5 May 1937 eventually formed the basis for series production, with aircraft being manufactured by SNCASO, the nationalised company that had absorbed Bloch and Blériot. Total production (including prototypes) was 143.

== MB.135 ==
A four-engined derivative of the MB.134, was developed powered by four 530 kW (710 hp) Gnome-Rhône 14M 14-cylinder radial engines, with an essentially similar airframe. The sole example flew for the first time on 12 January 1939.

== Operational history ==
Entering service in June 1938, the MB.131 went on to equip seven reconnaissance Groupes, six in metropolitan France and one in North Africa. Upon the outbreak of the war, the metropolitan Groupes suffered many losses in attempts at daylight reconnaissance of Germany's western borders. They were subsequently restricted to flying night missions, though they still suffered many losses. By May 1940, all metropolitan units had been converted to Potez 63.11 aircraft, with only the African groupe retaining them for front-line duty. After the Battle of France, the aircraft left in Vichy possession were relegated to target towing. Twenty-one unserviceable aeroplanes were reported captured by the Luftwaffe but photographic evidence suggests at least a few flew for the Nazis.

== Variants ==
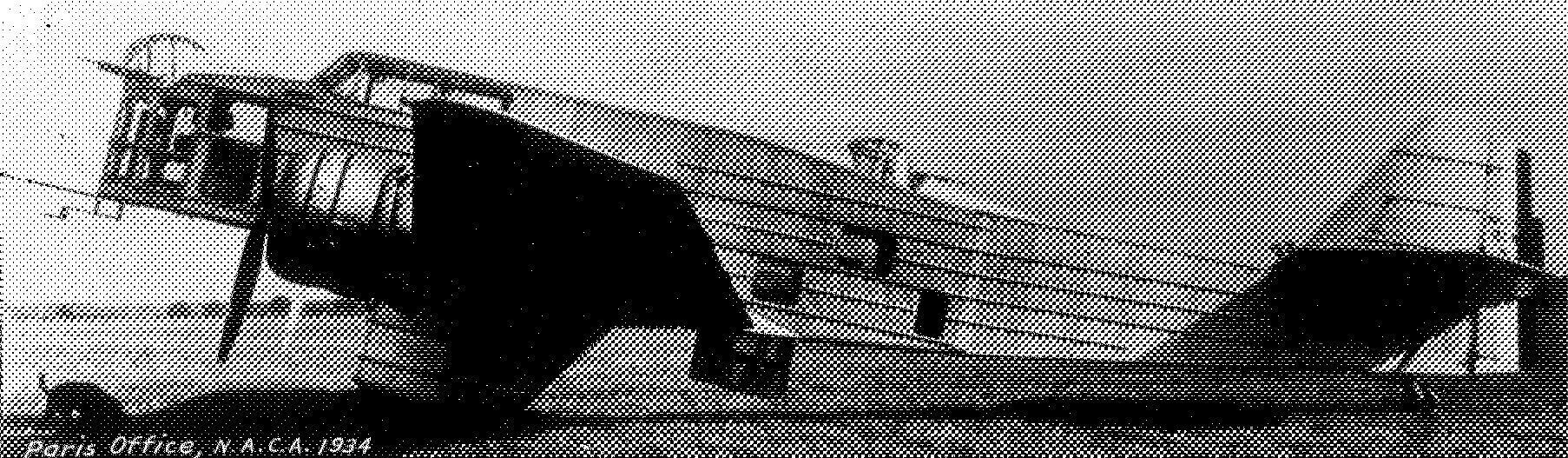
Bloch MB.130.01 photo from NACA-SR-26

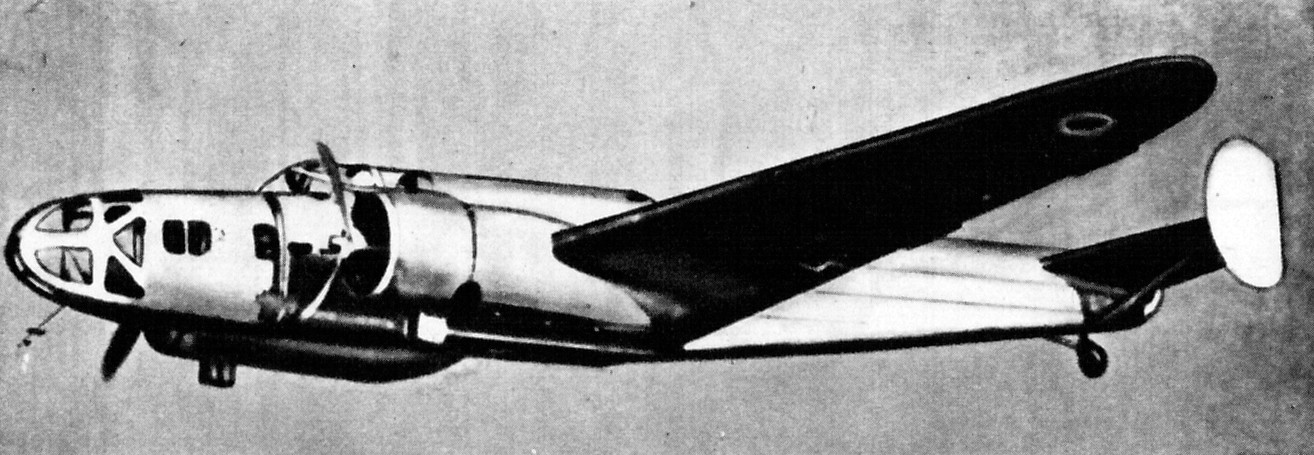
Bloch MB.133 prototype

MB.130.01
Original prototype, 2x Gnome-Rhône 14Kdrs engines
MB.131.01
First prototype, 2x Gnome-Rhône 14N-10
MB.131.02
Second prototype with revised wings, tail, and fuselage
MB.131R4
Initial versions with one central machine gun, 13 built. Note: Breffort and Joiuineau say that 14 R4 aircraft were built.
MB.131Ins
Dual control instructor version, 5 built
MB.131RB4
Four-seat reconnaissance-bomber aircraft. Internal bomb bay and revised equipment. 121 built, including two prototypes refitted to this standard. Note: Breffort and Joiuineau say that 100 RB4 aircraft were built.
MB.133
Prototype with redesigned tail, 1 built
MB.134
Prototype with two 820 kW (1,100 hp) Hispano-Suiza 14AA engines, 1 built
MB.135
A four engined derivative of the MB.134, powered by four 530 kW (710 hp) Gnome-Rhône 14M 14 cylinder radial engines
MB.136

== Operators ==
France

- French Air Force operated 141 aircraft.

Vichy France

- Vichy French Air Force operated some aircraft.

Nazi Germany

- Luftwaffe operated captured aircraft in restricted roles.

Poland

- Polish Air Forces in exile in France
  - Groupe de Bombardement Marche Polonais

== Specifications (MB.131RB.4) ==
Data from War Planes of the Second World War: Volume Seven Bombers and Reconnaissance Aircraft

General characteristics

- Crew: 4
- Length: 17.85 m (58 ft 7 in)
- Wingspan: 20.27 m (66 ft 6 in)
- Height: 4.09 m (13 ft 5 in)
- Wing area: 54 m^{2} (580 sq ft)
- Empty weight: 4,690 kg (10,340 lb)
- Gross weight: 7,928 kg (17,478 lb)
- Max takeoff weight: 8,600 kg (18,960 lb)
- Powerplant: 1 × Gnome-Rhône 14N-10 14-cylinder air-cooled radial piston engine, 708 kW (950 hp) RH rotation fitted to port
- Powerplant: 1 × Gnome-Rhône 14N-11 14-cylinder air-cooled radial piston engine, 708 kW (950 hp) LH rotation fitted to starboard
- Propellers: 3-bladed LH and RH rotation variable-pitch propellers

Performance

- Maximum speed: 349 km/h (217 mph, 188 kn) at 3,750 m (12,300 ft)
- Cruise speed: 270 km/h (170 mph, 150 kn)
- Range: 1,300 km (810 mi, 700 nmi)
- Service ceiling: 7,250 m (23,800 ft)
- Time to altitude: 4,000 m (13,000 ft) in 13 minutes

Armament

- Guns: 3 × 7.5 mm (.295 in) MAC 1934 machine guns in flexible mounts in the nose, dorsal turret and ventral gondola.
- Bombs: 4 × 200 kg (440 lb) or 6 × 100 kg (220 lb) or 8 × 50 kg (110 lb) or 64 × 10 kg (22 lb) bombs

== See also ==
Aircraft of comparable role, configuration, and era

- SAB AB-80
- Caproni Ca.310
- Dornier Do 17
- Martin Maryland

Related lists

- List of interwar military aircraft
- List of aircraft of World War II
- List of bomber aircraft
- List of aircraft of the French Air Force during World War II
- List of military aircraft of France

== Bibliography ==
- Green, William (1967). War Planes of the Second World War: Bombers and Reconnaissance Aircraft: Bombers and reconnaissance aircraft, Australia, Belgium, Bohemia-Moravia, Bulgaria, Canada, Finland, France. Vol. VII. London: Macdonald. OCLC 748281167.
