= Bloch MB.220 =

French twin-engined commercial aircraft

MB.220
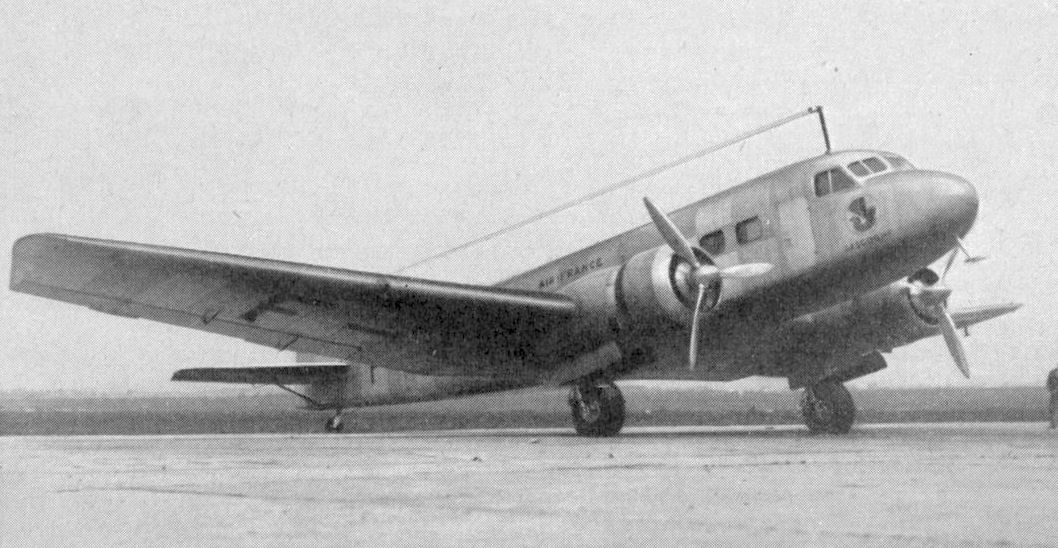

General information
- Type: Airliner
- Manufacturer: Société des Avions Marcel Bloch
- Primary users: Air France French Air Force
- Number built: 17

History
- Introduction date: 1938
- First flight: 1936
- Retired: 1950

The Bloch MB.220 was a French twin-engine passenger transport airplane built by Société des Avions Marcel Bloch during the 1930s.

== Design and development ==
The MB.220 was an all-metal low-wing cantilever monoplane. It was powered by two Gnome-Rhône 14N radial engines and had a retractable landing gear. Normal crew was four, with room for 16 passengers, with eight seats each side of a central aisle. The prototype first flew on 11 June 1936 at Villacoublay with André Curvale at the controls, and was followed by 16 production aircraft.

Six examples survived the war and were modified as the MB.221 with Wright R-1820-97 Cyclone engines.

== Service ==
Air France took delivery of five Bloch MB.220s in 1937, with the type entering service on the Paris–Marseilles route in the winter of 1937–1938. On 27 March 1938, the Bloch MB.220 was introduced on the Le Bourget and Croydon (in south of London) route, replacing the Wibault 280 and cutting the flight time by 15 minutes to 1 hour 15 minutes. In September 1938, two MB-220s carried the French delegation, including Prime Minister of France Édouard Daladier to the negotiations that led to the Munich Agreement.

Following the outbreak of World War II, five MB.220s were requisitioned as transports by the French Air Force. Air France continued to operate the MB.220 after the Armistice of 22 June 1940, although its fleet was gradually transferred to Vichy French government service. Following the Allied invasion of North Africa in November 1942, Germany occupied Vichy France, stopping Air France operations. Eleven MB.220s were leased to the German airline Deutsche Luft Hansa on 1 February 1943. The type entered service with Luft Hansa in June 1943, with three in service by September. It suffered engine problems in German service, particularly in cold weather, with French mechanics sometimes carried as part of the airliner's crew. Three MB.220s were used as military transports in North Africa by the Free French in 1944.

Five MB.220s survived the war, and returned to service with Air France on services within Europe in February 1946, after being reengined with 1,200 hp (890 kW) Wright R-1820 Cyclone to become MB.221s. This improved performance, with a 25 percent increase in range with the same weights and speed as the French engines. The type remained in Air France service until 1949, with the aircraft then being sold to the French airline Societé Auxiliaire de Navigation Aérienne. They had been withdrawn from use by 1952.

== Variants ==
MB.220
One prototype, registration F-AOHA, and 16 production aircraft with Gnome-Rhône 14N-16 and Gnome-Rhône 14N-17 engines (opposite rotation).
MB.221
Six survivors, registration F-AOHC to F-AOHF, F-AQNM and F-AQNN, re-engined with the Wright R-1820-97 Cyclone.

== Operators ==
France

- Air France
- Free French Air Force
- Vichy French Air Force
- Societé Auxiliaire de Navigation Aérienne

== Accidents and incidents ==
- On March 3, 1940, the prototype of the MB.220 crashed into a mountain near Orange, France in poor weather, killing all three crew on board.
- On September 1, 1941, the Air France MB.220 Languedoc, registration F-AQNL, crashed into a lake on takeoff from Marseille due to engine failure, killing all three crew and 12 of 14 passengers on board.

== Specifications (MB.220) ==
Bloch MB 220

Data from Jane's All the World's Aircraft 1938

General characteristics

- Crew: 3
- Capacity: 16
- Length: 19.6 m (64 ft 4 in)
- Wingspan: 22.8 m (74 ft 10 in)
- Height: 3.9 m (12 ft 10 in)
- Wing area: 75 m^{2} (810 sq ft)
- Empty weight: 6,500 kg (14,330 lb)
- Gross weight: 9,500 kg (20,944 lb)
- Fuel capacity: 2,160 L (570 US gal; 480 imp gal) in four wing tanks
- Powerplant: 1 × Gnome-Rhône 14N-16 14-cyl. two-row air-cooled piston engines, 682 kW (915 hp) at 1,750 m (5,741 ft)
  (right hand rotation)
- Powerplant: 1 × Gnome-Rhône 14N-17 14-cyl. two-row air-cooled piston engines, 682 kW (915 hp) at 1,750 m (5,740 ft)
  (left hand rotation)
- Propellers: 3-bladed Ratier variable-pitch propellers

Performance

- Maximum speed: 350 km/h (220 mph, 190 kn)
- Cruise speed: 300 km/h (190 mph, 160 kn) at 60% power
- Service ceiling: 7,000 m (23,000 ft) (on one engine 2,500 m (8,200 ft))
- Wing loading: 131 kg/m^{2} (27 lb/sq ft)
- Power/mass: 7.24 kg/kW (11.9 lb/hp)

== See also ==
Related development

- Bloch MB.300,

Aircraft of comparable role, configuration, and era

- Boeing 247
- Douglas DC-2
- Junkers Ju 52
- PZL.44 Wicher
