= Bloch MB.200 =

French bomber aircraft

MB.200
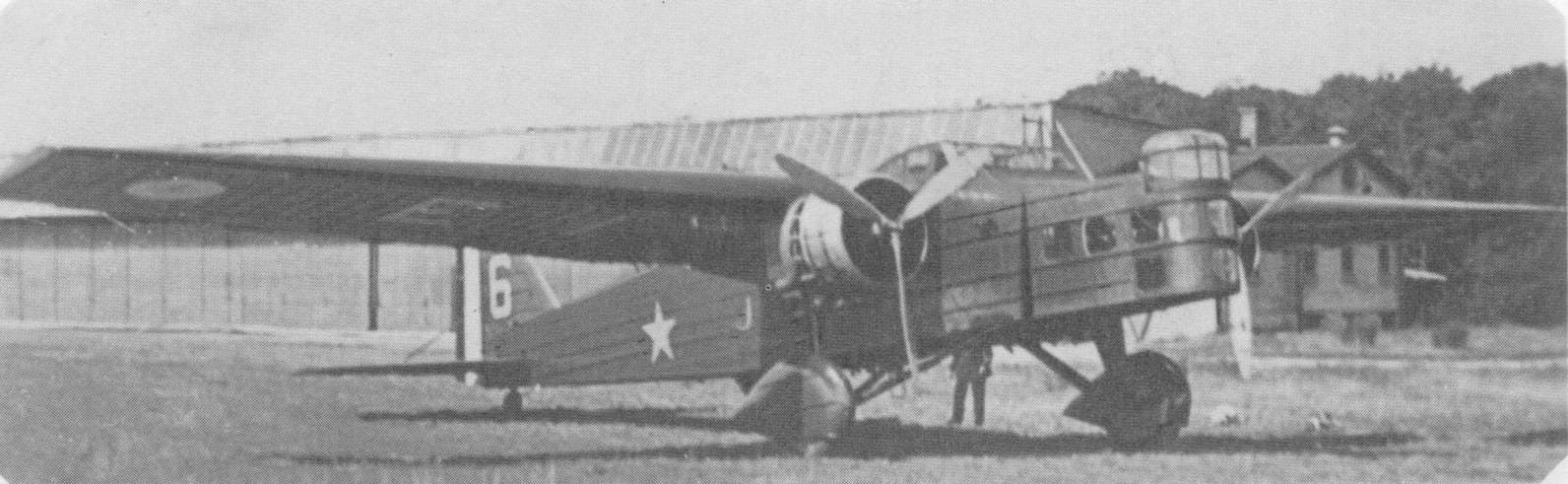

General information
- Type: Bomber
- Manufacturer: Societé des Avions Marcel Bloch
- Primary users: French Air Force Czechoslovak Air Force; Bulgarian Air Force; Luftwaffe
- Number built: 332

History
- Manufactured: 1933–1939
- Introduction date: 1935
- First flight: 26 June 1933
- Developed into: MB.210

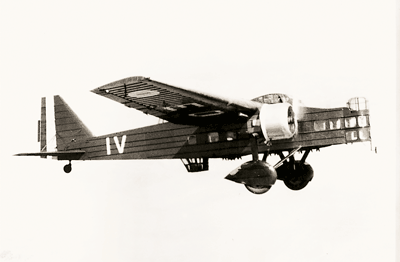
Aero MB 200

The MB.200 was a French bomber aircraft of the 1930s designed and built by Societé des Avions Marcel Bloch. A twin-engined high-winged monoplane with a fixed undercarriage, over 200 MB.200s were built for the French Air Force, and the type was also licence built by Czechoslovakia, but it soon became obsolete, and was largely phased out by the start of the Second World War.

== Development and design ==
The Bloch MB.200 was designed in response to a 1932 requirement for a new day/night bomber to equip the French Air Force. It was a high-winged all-metal cantilever monoplane, with a slab-sided fuselage, powered by two Gnome & Rhône 14Kirs radial engines. It had a fixed tailwheel undercarriage and featured an enclosed cockpit for the pilots. Defensive machine guns were in nose and dorsal gun turrets and an under fuselage gondola.

The first of three prototypes flew on 26 June 1933. As one of the winning designs for the competition, (the other was the larger Farman F.221), an initial order for 30 MB.200s was placed on 1 January 1934, entering service late in that year. Further orders followed, and the MB.200 equipped 12 French squadrons by the end of 1935. Production in France totalled over 208 aircraft (4 by Bloch, 19 by Breguet, 19 by Loire, 45 by Hanriot, 10 by SNCASO and 111 by Potez).

== Operational history ==
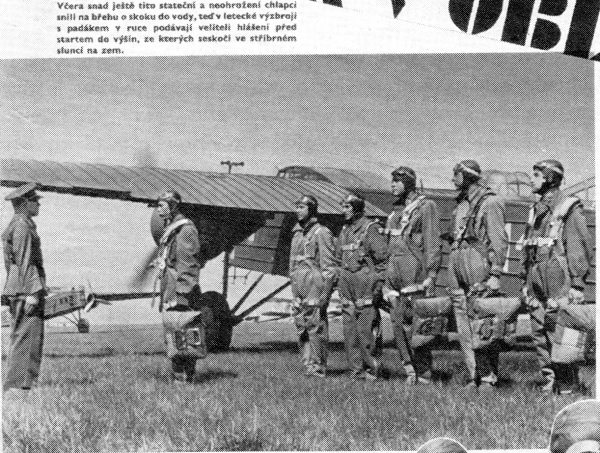

Czechoslovakia chose the MB.200 as part of a modernisation program for its air force of the mid-1930s. Although at the rate of aircraft development at that time, the MB.200 would quickly become obsolete, the Czechoslovaks needed a quick solution involving the license production of a proven design, as their own aircraft industry did not have sufficient development experience with such a large aircraft, or with all-metal airframes and stressed-skin construction, placing an initial order for 74 aircraft. After some delays, both Aero and Avia began license-production in 1937, with a total of about 124 built. Czechoslovak MB.200s were basically similar to their French counterparts, with differences in defensive armament and other equipment.

The Spanish Republic acquired 2 units thirty days after the beginning of the Spanish Civil War. These units were sent to Barcelona. Later, 30 units more were sent by ship and assembled in Air France's workshop at Prat de Llobregat. A third of the whole airfleet were shot down during the first months of the conflict and the rest were limited to the defense of the republican east coast during the rest of the war serving under the Escuadra 7 and the Grupo 72 combined with other French bombers. None of the 32 planes survived the conflict.

The gradual German conquest of Czechoslovakia meant that MB.200s eventually passed under their control, including aircraft that were still coming off the production line. As well as serving in the German Luftwaffe, some bombers were distributed to Bulgaria.

Vichy France deployed a squadron of MB.200s against the Allied invasion of Lebanon and Syria in 1941, carrying out at least one daylight bombing mission against British shipping.

== Variants ==
MB.200.01
single prototype –
MB.200B.4
main production version – 2x Gnome-Rhône 14Kirs
MB.201
two Hispano-Suiza 12Ybrs engines
MB.202
four Gnome-Rhône 7Kdrs engines
MB.203
two Clerget 14F diesel engines

== Operators ==
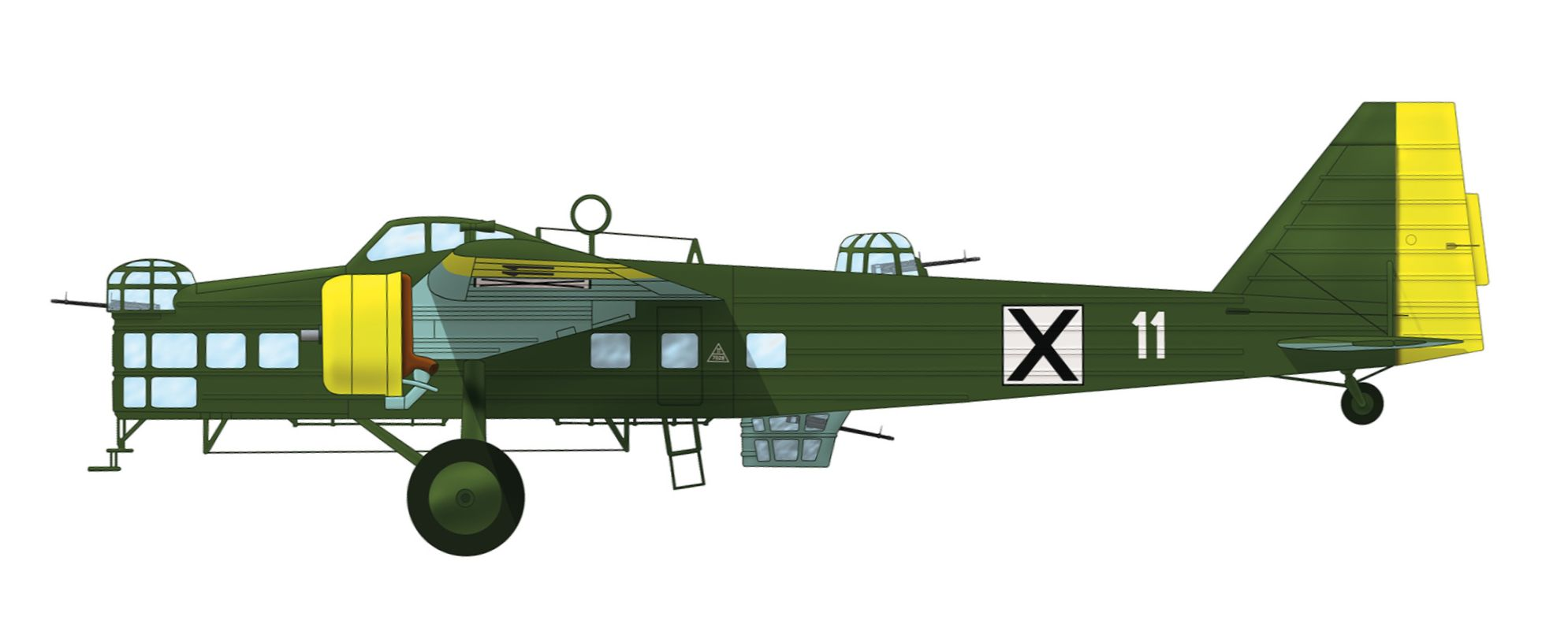
Aero MB.200, Bulgarian Air Force, 1941

Bulgaria
Bulgarian Air Force – Purchased 12 ex-Czech MB.200s from Germany in 1939, using them as trainers.
Czechoslovakia
Czechoslovak Air Force

France

Armée de l'Air (from 1935)

Vichy France

Vichy French Air Force

Nazi Germany

Luftwaffe (captured)

Slovak State

Slovak Air Force (1 piece)

Republicans

Spanish Republican Air Force received 30 units from France, at least one aircraft survived 1938 but none of them survived throughout the war.

== Specifications (MB.200B.4) ==
General characteristics

- Crew: 4
- Length: 16 m (52 ft 6 in)
- Wingspan: 22.45 m (73 ft 8 in)
- Height: 3.9 m (12 ft 10 in)
- Wing area: 62.5 m^{2} (673 sq ft)
- Empty weight: 4,300 kg (9,480 lb)
- Max takeoff weight: 7,480 kg (16,491 lb)
- Powerplant: 2 × Gnome-Rhône 14Kirs 14-cyl. 2-row air-cooled radial piston engines, 649 kW (870 hp) each

Performance

- Maximum speed: 285 km/h (177 mph, 154 kn)
- Range: 1,000 km (620 mi, 540 nmi)
- Service ceiling: 8,000 m (26,000 ft)
- Rate of climb: 4.33 m/s (852 ft/min)

Armament

- Guns: 3 × 7.5 mm (0.295 in) MAC 1934 machine guns (one for each defensive post).
- Bombs: 1,200 kg (2,646 lb) of bombs

== See also ==
Related development

- MB.210

Aircraft of comparable role, configuration, and era

- LWS-6 Żubr

Related lists

- List of interwar military aircraft
- List of aircraft of World War II
- List of aircraft of the French Air Force during World War II
- List of aircraft of the Spanish Republican Air Force
- List of bomber aircraft

== Bibliography ==
- Comas, Matthieu (September 2000). "Les bombardiers polonais de Lyon-Bron" [The Polish Bombers of Lyon-Bron]. Avions: Toute l'Aéronautique et son histoire (in French) (90): 30–32. ISSN 1243-8650.
- Fernandez, José (October 1993). "Le Bloch MB 200 (3ème partie)" [The Bloch MB 200, Part 3]. Avions: Toute l'aéronautique et son histoire (in French) (8): 41–46. ISSN 1243-8650.
- Fernandez, José (November 1993). "Le Bloch MB 200 (4ème partie)". Avions: Toute l'aéronautique et son histoire (in French) (9): 8–19. ISSN 1243-8650.
- Fernandez, José (December 1993). "Le Bloch MB 200 (5ème partie)". Avions: Toute l'aéronautique et son histoire (in French) (10): 34–37. ISSN 1243-8650.
- Abellán García-Muñoz, Juan "Galería de aviones de la Guerra civil española (1936–1939)". Instituto de Historia y Cultura aeronáuticas, Ministerio de Defensa 1996 pp. 80–81 ISBN 84-7823-485-3.
