= Bloch MB.700 =

1940s French aircraft

MB.700

General information
- Type: Single-seat Interceptor
- Manufacturer: Bloch
- Primary user: Armée de l'Air
- Number built: 1

History
- First flight: 19 April 1940

The Bloch MB.700 was a French low-wing monoplane interceptor designed by Société des Avions Marcel Bloch during World War II.

== Specifications ==
Data from

General characteristics

- Crew: 1
- Length: 7.34 m (24 ft 1 in)
- Wingspan: 8.90 m (29 ft 2 in)
- Height: 3.40 m (11 ft 2 in)
- Wing area: 12.40 m^{2} (133.5 sq ft)
- Powerplant: 1 × Gnome-Rhône 14M-6 14-cyl. two-row air-cooled radial piston engine
- Propellers: 3-bladed variable-pitch propeller

Performance

- Maximum speed: 550 km/h (340 mph, 300 kn)

Armament

- 2 × 20 mm Hispano-Suiza HS.404 cannon with 60-round drum magazines
- 2 × 7.5 mm (0.295 in) MAC 1934 M39 machine guns with 500 rpg

== Bibliography ==
- Roux, Robert J. (May 1970). "M. Bloch 700". Le Album de Fanatique de l'Aviation (in French) (8): 6–7. ISSN 0757-4169.
