= Bloch MB.141 =

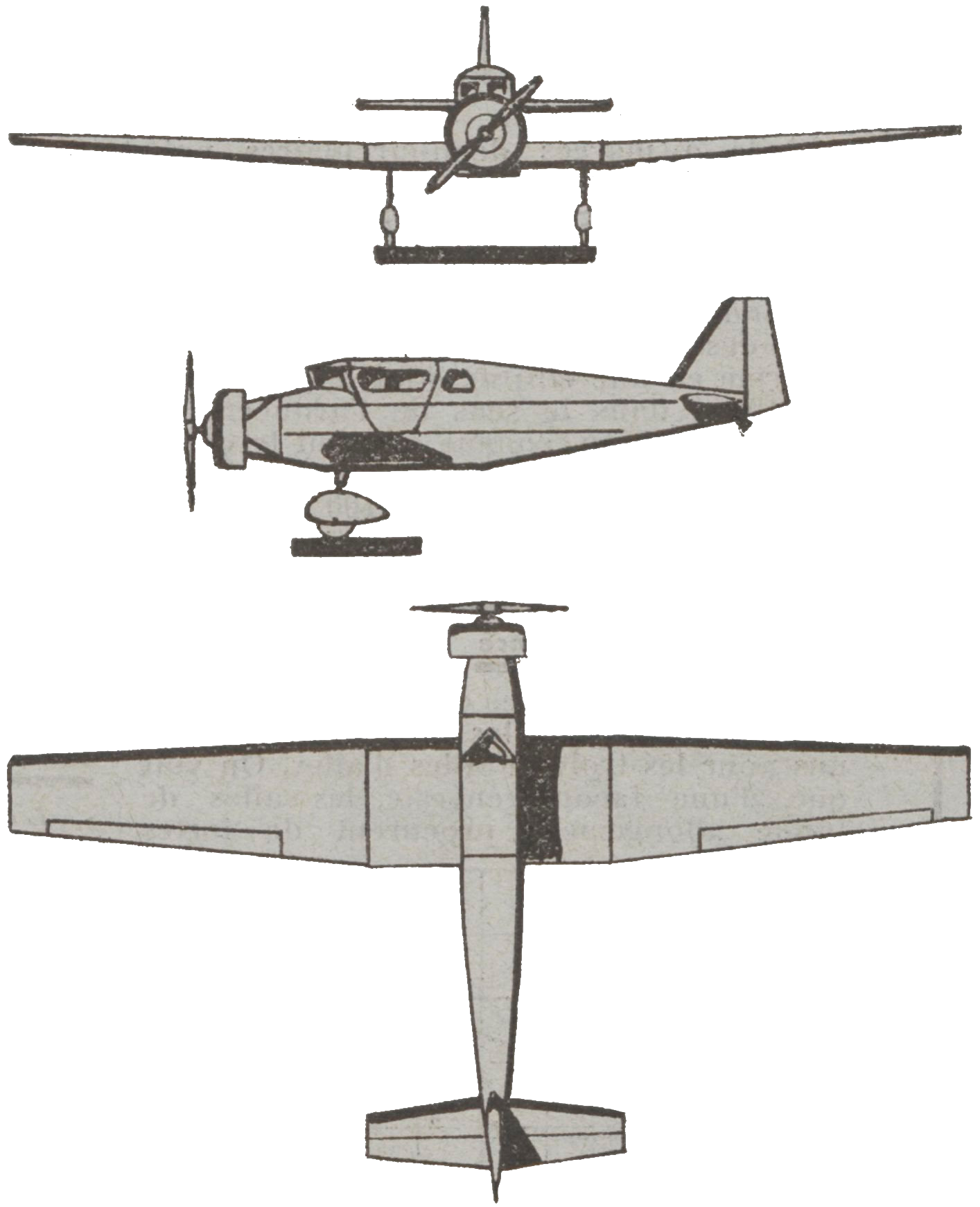

General information
- Type: Two seat light aircraft
- National origin: France
- Manufacturer: Marcel Bloch
- Number built: 1

History
- First flight: July 1934
- Developed from: Bloch MB.81

The Bloch MB.141 was a French all-metal two seat light aircraft derived from the Bloch MB.81 air ambulance. Only one was built.

== Design and development ==
The MB.141 was a low wing cantilever monoplane with a three part wing consisting of a rectangular plan centre section and trapezoidal outer panels. It was built around two spars and metal skinned; the leading edges were removable for maintenance purposes and the trailing edges carried high aspect ratio ailerons which filled about two-thirds of the outer panels.

Its 110 kW (150 hp) five cylinder Hispano-Suiza 5Q radial engine (a licence-built Wright R-540) was mounted in the nose within a narrow-chord cowling. Behind it the fuselage was flat-sided, constructed from panels linked by frames which left the interior free of cross-bracing. The well-appointed cabin was 3.16 m (10.4 ft) long with two seats in tandem, fitted with dual controls, and a luggage space behind. The forward seat was behind a two-piece, V-shaped windscreen and on each side there was a pair of windows; on the port side the largest of these was in the large, trapezoidal door.

Behind the cabin the fuselage tapered to a conventional tail with straight-tapered, square-tipped surfaces. The tailplane and elevator were mounted near the top of the fuselage and well ahead of the rudder hinge. The control surfaces were not balanced.

The MB.141 had a fixed tail wheel undercarriage with a track of 2.80 m (9.2 ft); its main wheels were mounted on vertical, faired oleo struts and had brakes operated by a lever on the control column. Its small, castoring tail wheel also had a shock absorber.

Its first flights were made towards the end of July 1934, piloted by Bloch's test pilot Zacharie Heu, who spoke highly of its handling. It has been described as "too heavy", possibly underpowered as it weighed a little more than the MB.81 but had a less powerful engine. It was also expensive to construct, so only one MB.141 was built.

It is unusual for an unflown prototype aircraft to be the first prize in a lottery but in April 1934 the MB.141 was donated by Marcel Bloch to the Ecole Nationale Supérieure de l'Aéronautique. The lottery was advertised in the French aviation press and drawn on 22 July 1934; the winning ticket was announced at the end of August.

== Specifications ==
Data from Les Ailes April 1934

General characteristics

- Crew: One pilot
- Capacity: One passenger
- Length: 7.80 m (25 ft 7 in)
- Wingspan: 12.60 m (41 ft 4 in)
- Wing area: 17.80 m^{2} (191.6 sq ft)
- Empty weight: 600 kg (1,323 lb)
- Gross weight: 950 kg (2,094 lb) normal
- Max takeoff weight: 1,100 kg (2,425 lb)
- Fuel capacity: 300 litres (66 imp gal; 79 US gal)
- Powerplant: 1 × Hispano-Suiza 5Q 5-cylinder radial, 110 kW (150 hp) nominal, 130 kW (180 hp) equivalent
- Propellers: 2-bladed

Performance

- Maximum speed: 210 km/h (130 mph, 110 kn)
- Cruise speed: 180 km/h (110 mph, 97 kn)
- Range: 1,500 km (930 mi, 810 nmi)
- Service ceiling: 6,000 m (20,000 ft)
- Take-off run: 100 m (330 ft)
- Landing run: 120 m (390 ft)
