= Bloch MB.60 =

Tri-motor mailplane designed and built in France

MB.60
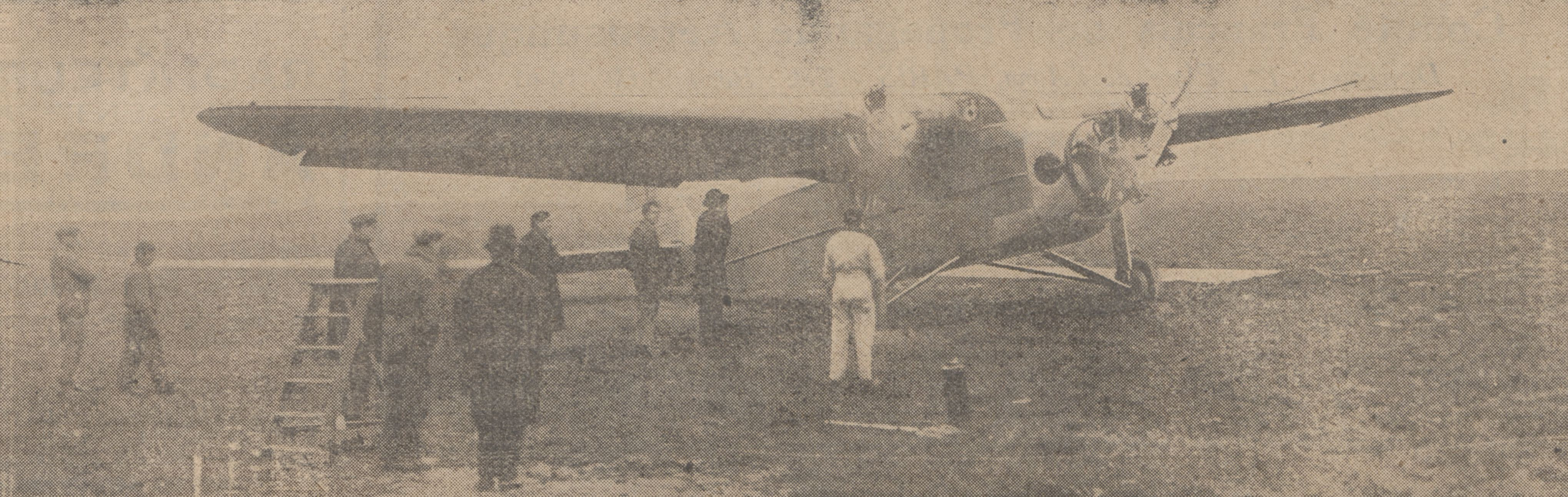

General information
- Type: 3-engined mailplane
- National origin: France
- Manufacturer: Société des Avions Marcel Bloch
- Designer: Pineau & Marcel Riffard
- Number built: 2

History
- First flight: 12 September 1930

The Bloch MB.60, initially known as the MB.VI (continuing the SEA number series), was a tri-motor mailplane designed and built in France from 1930 to 1931 to an order for an aircraft suitable for use as a postal, commercial or medical transport.

== Design and development ==
Marcel bloch formed Société des Avions Marcel Bloch in 1929, the company's first project was the MB.60 3-engined commercial transport aircraft. Built entirely of light alloys with steel for high strength fittings, the MB.60 introduced several new techniques, including rivetting external stringers and longerons to skin sheets before attachment to ribs and frames; delivering a robust light structure that was also easy to manufacture.

Powered by three 89 kW (120 hp) Salmson 9AC in the nose of the fuselage and wing mounted nacelles, the sole MB.60 was a high wing cantilever monoplane with wings in three sections, the outer sections having moderate dihedral. The square section fuselage had a constant-section cabin with rear fuselage tapering to the all metal tail unit constructed using the same external stringer method. The undercarriage consisted of tall, strut braced oleo-pneumatic main-legs, attached at the outer engine nacelles, with a light alloy steerable tail-wheel at the end of the fuselage.

A second aircraft, built as the MB.61 powered by three 89 kW (120 hp) Lorraine 5Pc, first flew in February 1931. Neither the MB.60 or MB.61 garnered any production orders.

== Operational history ==
Constructed at Buc by a sub-contractor, under close supervision by Bloch and his team, the MB.60 was first flown on 12 September 1930, piloted by René Delmotte. Testing at Buc and Villacoublay revealed satisfactory flight characteristics and performance.

After a modification programme the MB.61 crashed in April 1931 due to inversion of the controls during re-assembly; after repair the MB.61 continued flight tests from 1 May 1931.

== Variants ==
Data from: Dassault Aviation: MB 60-61: origins, characteristics and performance data

MB.VI
Initial designation of the MB.60 at the project stage, powered by three 89 kW (120 hp) Salmson 9AC engines;not built.
MB.60
The first prototype, an enlarged version of the MB.VI, powered by three 89 kW (120 hp) Salmson 9AC engines; one built.
MB.61
A second aircraft powered by three 89 kW (120 hp) Lorraine 5Pc engines; one built.
MB.62 ET4
A four seat military trainer version; not built

== Specifications (MB.61) ==
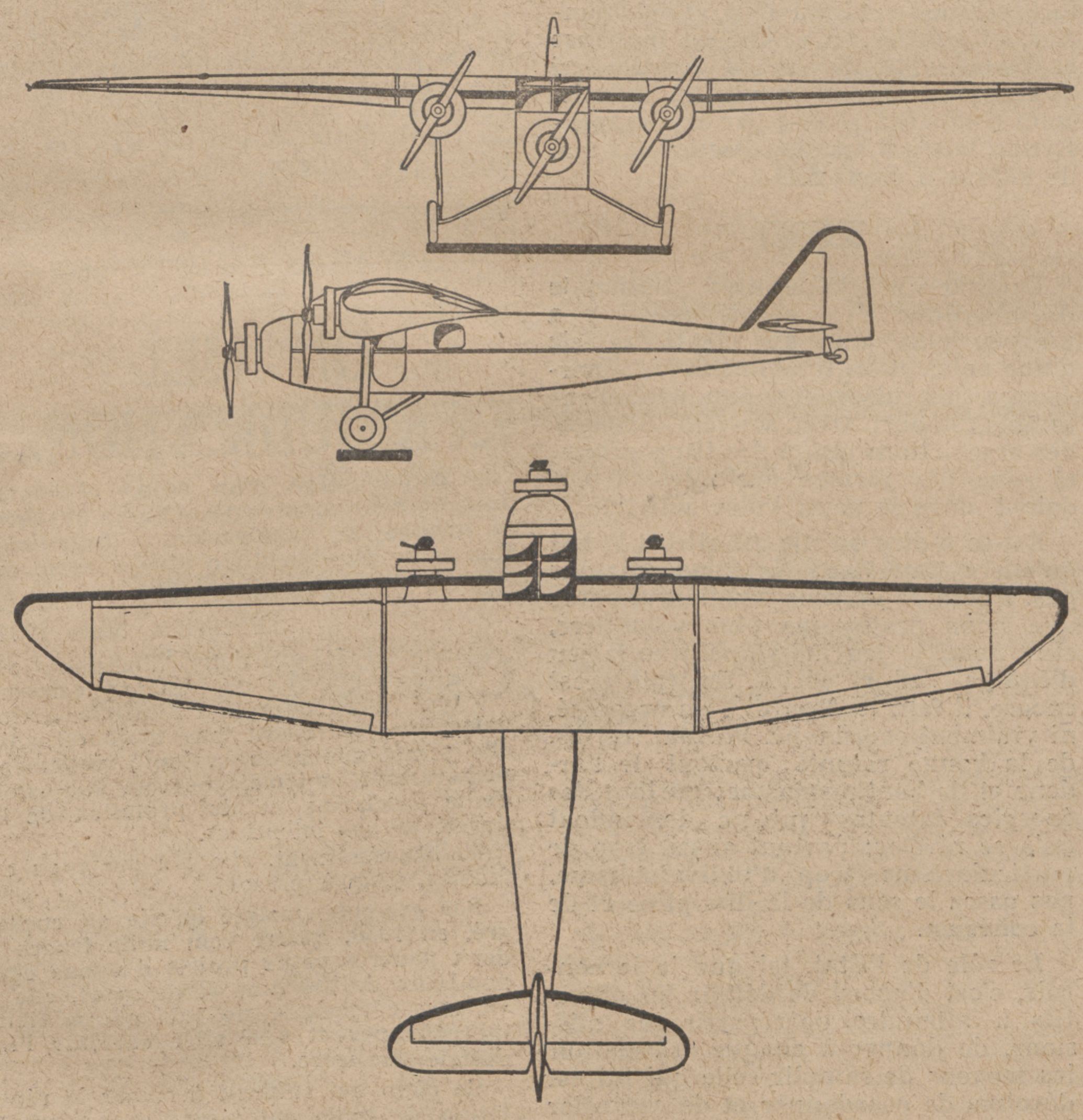
3-views of the MB.61.

Data from Dassault Aviation: MB 60-61: origins, characteristics and performance data, Jane's all the World's Aircraft 1931

General characteristics

- Crew: 3
- Capacity: 350 kg (770 lb) payload
- Length: 8.5 m (27 ft 11 in)
- Wingspan: 18.5 m (60 ft 8 in)
- Height: 3 m (9 ft 10 in)
- Wing area: 42 m^{2} (450 sq ft)
- Max takeoff weight: 2,580 kg (5,688 lb)
- Powerplant: 3 × Lorraine 5Pc 5-cyl. air-cooled radial piston engines, 89 kW (120 hp) each
- Propellers: 2-bladed fixed-pitch metal propellers

Performance

- Maximum speed: 200 km/h (120 mph, 110 kn)
- Stall speed: 100 km/h (62 mph, 54 kn)
- Wing loading: 61 kg/m^{2} (12 lb/sq ft)
- Power/mass: 8.4 kg/kW (13.8 lb/hp)
