= Bloch MB.90 =

1930s French light aircraft

General information
- Type: Light aircraft
- National origin: France
- Manufacturer: Marcel Bloch
- Number built: 3, including the MB.100 (1 not completed)

History
- First flight: June 1932
- Developed into: Bloch MB.100

The Bloch MB.90 was the first all-metal French light aircraft. Only two aircraft were completed, making their first flights in 1932, though there were several variants.

== Design and development ==
Though they were not a commercial success, the Bloch MB.90 and its variants were notable as the first French all-metal, meaning metal-framed, light aircraft. The MB.90 was a single engine, braced high wing design; the wing was in two parts, each with two I-section spars, constant chord and rounded tips. Their structure was duralumin and their covering fabric. The rectangular cross-section fuselage of the MB.90 was a tubular steel structure, fabric covered apart from the cabin which had plywood floor and sides. Sources disagree about the seating: a contemporary account described it as side-by-side but a recent review as tandem. Pairs of parallel bracing struts linked wing spars to the lower fuselage longerons. The fuselage narrowed rearwards to a conventional tail with a rectangular, round tipped tailplane mounted on the fuselage and a triangular fin with an unbalanced rudder which reached down to the keel.

Though the MB.90 was intended to be Renault powered, it was initially flown with a 120 hp (89 kW) de Havilland Gipsy III air-cooled four cylinder inverted engine. It had a fixed tailwheel undercarriage, with its main wheels on V-form split axles hinged on the lower fuselage longerons. At their outer ends, vertical shock absorbing struts reached up to the forward wing struts, strengthened at that point by two further struts to the lower and upper fuselage.

Two variants were displayed at the 1932 Paris Aero Show, both with 120 hp (89 kW) Renault 4Pei four cylinder inline engines. These were designated the MB.91 and MB.92. The former was shown incomplete and was never flown but it introduced some new features which were used on two further variants; it had wings struts that diverged slightly from below, a rounded fin and faired-in split-axles. Like the MB.90 it was a side-by side two-seater but the MB.92, otherwise similar, had tandem seats in a narrower fuselage. Later a Pobjoy Niagara engine installation was offered for the MB.91. With the same modifications to fin, undercarriage and struts, one of the MB.90s became the MB.93, powered by a 120 hp (89 kW) de Havilland Gipsy Major I, a close relative of the Gipsy III with slightly increased capacity.

In 1933 Bloch tested a four-seat development, the Bloch MB.100, powered by a 165 hp (123 kW) Hispano-Suiza 5Q 5-cylinder radial engine, essentially a licence-built Wright R-540 Whirlwind. The MB.100 had two rows of side-by-side seating.

== Operational history ==
Both MB.90s were registered to compete in the third FAI International Tourist Plane Contest, Le Challenge de Tourisme International, held in Germany in August 1932 and were recorded as having Renault engines. They failed to make the deadline and did not compete. The MB.92 remained on the French register until at least 1937.

== Variants ==
MB.90
Initially flown with de Havilland Gipsy III engine in June 1932 but fitted with a 120 hp (89 kW) Renault 4Pei inverted inline engine for the 1932 Paris Aero Show. Parallel lift struts and triangular fin.
MB.91
Not flown; shown wingless at the 1932 Salon with the Renault engine. Lift struts converging somewhat to the fuselage, rounded fin and faired-in axles. A Pobjoy Niagara engine proposed in 1933.
MB.92 Grande Tourisme
First flown 9 September 1932, with the Renault engine driving a metal propeller. Rounded fin, struts and faired undercarriage as MB.91. Seen at the 1932 Salon as a narrower, tandem seat machine.
MB.93
One of the MB.90s modified to take a 120 hp (89 kW) de Havilland Gipsy Major I and the fin, struts and undercarriage of the MB.91.
MB.100
A four-seat development of the MB.90

== Specifications (MB 90) ==
Data from Flight 20 October 1932

General characteristics

- Wingspan: 7 m (23 ft 0 in)
- Wing area: 13 m^{2} (140 sq ft)
- Empty weight: 320 kg (705 lb)
- Gross weight: 620 kg (1,367 lb)
- Powerplant: 1 × de Havilland Gipsy III 4-cylinder inverted inline engine, 89 kW (120 hp)

Performance

- Maximum speed: 210 km/h (130 mph, 110 kn)
- Cruise speed: 180 km/h (110 mph, 97 kn)
- Range: 800 km (500 mi, 430 nmi)
- Service ceiling: 6,000 m (20,000 ft)
- Time to altitude: 4 min to 1,000 m (3,281 ft)

== Bibliography ==
- Cortet, Pierre (November 2001). "Rétros du Mois" [Retros of the Month]. Avions: Toute l'Aéronautique et son histoire (in French) (104): 8. ISSN 1243-8650.
