= Dr. Peters =

German investment firm

Dr. Peters Group
- Company type: limited partnership
- Industry: Financial services
- Founded: 1975; 51 years ago
- Headquarters: Dortmund, Germany
- Key people: Kristina Salamon (CEO), Dr. Albert Tillmann (COO)
- Products: Investment funds holding tangible assets
- Number of employees: 400 (2023)
- Website: www.dr-peters.de

The Dr. Peters Group is a German investment firm that builds investment funds based on tangible assets. The company is registered in Dortmund and has been operating since 1975 in the legal form of a limited partnership. The investment targets are mobile and immobile goods of the real economy such as ships, real estate and aircraft. Dr. Peters Group is no longer active on the secondary market for life insurances which was once part of the business.

The funds are offered to investors in Germany and Austria via banks and free agents. Since 2013, the Dr. Peters Group has been designing funds for national and international institutional investors. The group is a member of the Bundesverband Sachwerte und Investmentvermögen e.V. (German Federal Association of Real Assets and Investment Assets).

== Development of the company ==
=== Start of real estate investments ===
The first fund was launched and invested in a retirement home in Dortmund. Since 1977, the company has directed the product brand DS-Fonds (DS = Dynamism & Safety). Until the end of the 1990s, the funds invested in different real estate segments such as hotels, care real estate, shopping centres and office buildings in Germany.

=== Expansion through ship investments ===
Beginning in 1990, the company invested in cargo ships which formed the focus of investment until 2007. After financing cooling ships, container ships and product tankers, the company introduced and established KG-financing of tankers subject to the long-term charter concept on the German market in 1998. From 2001 onwards, investments in bulk carriers, large container ships and foreign real estate (USA) followed.

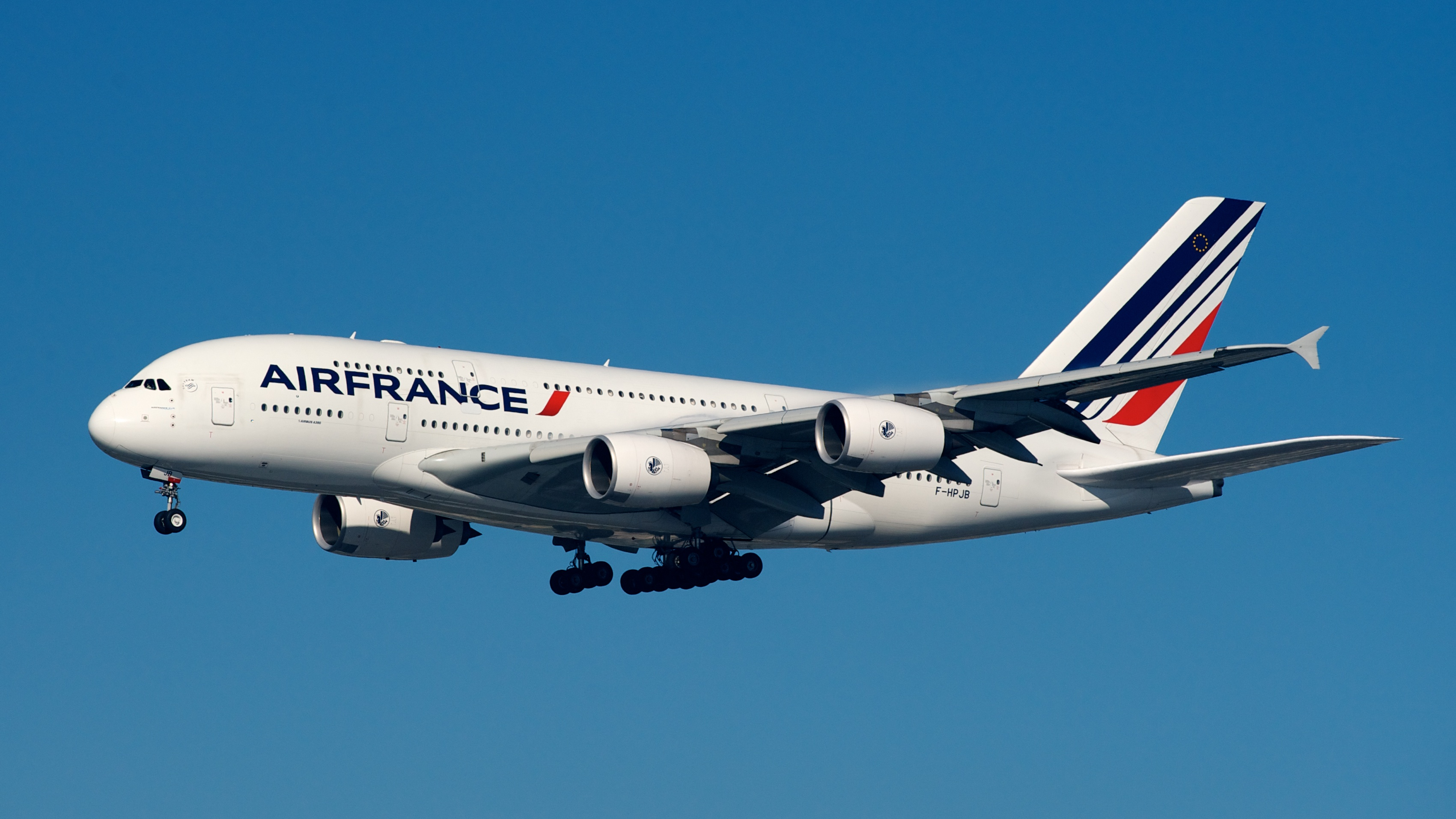
An Airbus A380-800 of Air France leased from Dr. Peters

=== The present investment focus: aircraft funds ===
Since 2007, the company has been investing in the aircraft field, among others by purchasing aircraft of the type Airbus A380-800. This established the Dr. Peters Group as the pioneer in aircraft investments in Germany with 17 current aircraft investments. Forecast dividends have all been paid until now. The company has become the market leader in Germany with a total placed capital of €1.03 billion.

=== Problems caused by the financing and shipping crisis ===
Currently, several of the ship funds suffer partly serious financial difficulties due to the financial and shipping crisis. Disbursements are currently partly no longer made. Insolvencies of funds have also occurred – e.g. Fund 111. Investors in other funds were requested by the fund companies of the issuing house to repay their dividend payments. This was partly stopped by the Federal Court of Justice with detailed arguments; in the cases decided to date, not the funds themselves but only their creditors could demand return of the disbursements.

== Subsidiaries ==
- Dr. Peters Asset Finance GmbH & Co. KG Kapitalverwaltungsgesellschaft (KVG)
- Dr. Peters GmbH & Co. Emissionshaus KG - responsible for the sales and marketing of newly conceived funds
- Dr. Peters GmbH & Co. KG - responsibility is the management of fund companies not administered by the KVG
- DS Aviation GmbH & Co. KG - is responsible for acquiring aircraft and handle all contracts in the aircraft industry.
- DS Skytech Ltd (UK) - is responsible for engineers and has aviation experts for technical asset management of aircraft.
- DS Schifffahrt GmbH & Co. KG - is responsible for the technical and commercial asset management of the ships in the group.
- DS Immobilien GmbH & Co. KG - responsible for the real estate management in the group.

== Financed tangible asset portfolio ==
Real Estate	Total 51: 20 hotels, 12 retirement homes, 9 shopping centres, 6 foreign real estate units, 4 office/commercial buildings and one logistics real estate
Ships	42 oil/product tankers, 33 container ships, 8 mass good freighters, 2 gas tankers and 2 cooling ships
Aircraft	A total of 20, including 9 Airbus A380, 4 Boeing 777, 5 Boeing 787-8 (Dreamliner) and 2 Airbus A319 for airlines like Air France, Emirates or Singapore Airlines
