= Ramp-up =

Term in economics and business

Ramp-up is a term used in economics and business to describe an increase in a firm's production ahead of anticipated increases in product demand. Alternatively, ramp-up describes the period from completed initial product development to maximum capacity utilization, characterized by product and process experimentation and improvements.

Ramp-up in the first sense often occurs when a company strikes a deal with a distributor, retailer, or producer, which will substantially increase product demand. For example, in June, 2008, after launching a joint venture with Guangzhou Automobile, Toyota announced that it would "ramp up" production in China to meet expected increases in market demand by constructing a plant in Guangdong, which would produce some 120,000 additional Camry sedans. In the consumer electronics industry, manufacturers often ramp-up production in the early fall to meet demand during the holiday selling season.

As ramp-up is typical in early stages of firm or market development, the term and process is widely associated with venture capital, which seek to rapidly increase rate of return on investment, just prior to exit. For example, Wrightspeed, the producer of the X1 electric car prototype, began to seek out capital in order to hire on 50 well-trained employees in order to "ramp up" production in anticipation of sales successes.

Ramp up may also refer to how quickly dispatchable generation from power plants can increase, and ramp down by how quickly it can decrease whilst still remaining operational (not shutting down), with "ramp" being either way.
