= Boeing New Midsize Airplane =

Proposed aircraft to fill the middle of the market segment

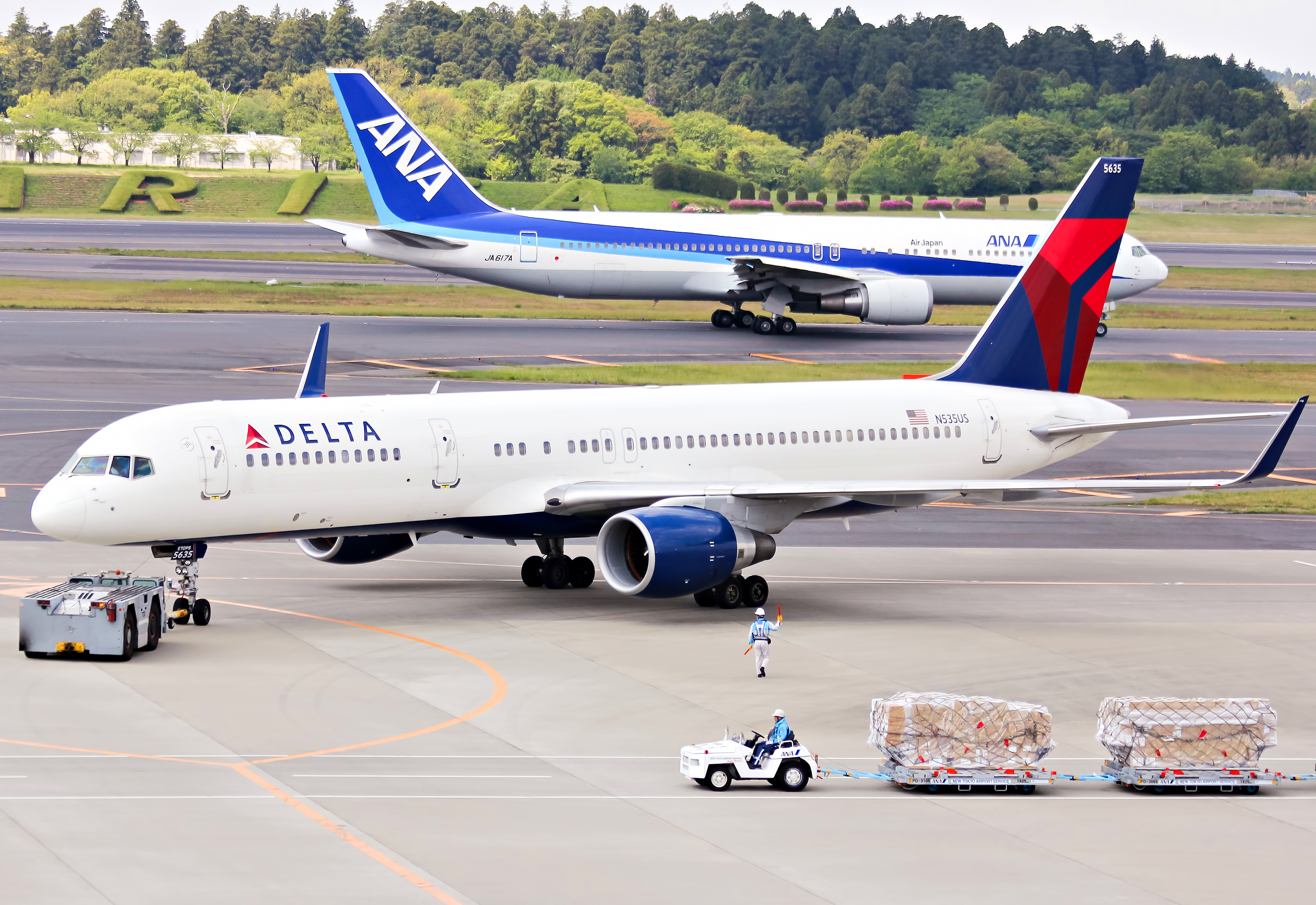
The New Midsize Airplane would have been sized between the 757 (front) and 767 (rear) in the middle of the market.

The New Midsize Airplane (NMA), or New Midsize Aircraft, is a concept airliner proposed by Boeing to fill the middle of the market segment.

In 2015, Boeing determined the market was large enough to launch a new design. In 2017, multiple airlines expressed interest in a composite, seven-abreast twin-aisle with an elliptical cross-section. The new aircraft, which would likely have been named the Boeing 797, would be available in two versions: a 225-seater with 5,000 nmi (9,300 km) range and a 275-seater with a range of 4,500 nmi (8,300 km). Third-party forecasts for this market varied from 2,000 to 4,000 aircraft, though Boeing expected the market demand to lie at the upper end of this range. At a projected price of $65–75 million, the NMA was expected to generate 30% more revenue than narrowbodies and have 40% lower trip costs than the widebodies it would have replaced. It would have been powered by a new 50,000 lbf (220 kN) turbofan from GE Aviation/CFM International or Pratt & Whitney, with a bypass ratio of 10:1 or more and an overall pressure ratio exceeding 50:1.

In January 2020, Boeing put the plans on hold and announced a clean-sheet reevaluation of the project, noting that it was focused on returning the 737 MAX to service and would be taking a new approach to future projects. By February 2021, the company appeared to have revived the project with plans for a shorter variant that could enter service by the late 2020s with a development cost of up to $25 billion. In June 2022, however, it announced that the development would not be pursued until new engines and development tools are mature.

== History ==
=== 2015 ===
At Air Lease Corp. Steven F. Udvar-Házy believed that Boeing was planning to launch a more capable, all-new replacement for the Boeing 757 rather than a re-engined version. At the International Society of Transport Aircraft Trading conference, he predicted it would be a Boeing 767-like, twin-aisle airplane capable of using 7,000-foot (2,130 m) runways such as those at New York LaGuardia. Boeing's VP of Marketing Randy Tinseth said the company focused on developing an aircraft with 20% more range and capacity than the 757-200. United Airlines consulted Airbus and Boeing about replacing its 757s and was waiting for Boeing's response, as Tinseth wanted to fill the gap between the 737 MAX and the 787.

Before the 2015 Paris Air Show, sales chief John Wojick said Boeing had held discussions with customers and determined that the market was large enough to launch an all-new jet airliner, the first since the launch of the 787 Dreamliner in 2003. At the show, Airbus CEO Fabrice Bregier estimated that Boeing would have to invest $10 billion to develop a 757 successor with 220 seats and a range of 4,500 nmi (8,300 km), corresponding to the capabilities stated by Boeing's vice president for product development Mike Sinnett. Vinay Bhaskara of Airways News said Boeing's middle of the market (MOM) airliner would likely launch before 2020 and enter service in the early part of the following decade.

Boeing denied that the new aircraft would be an update to the Boeing 767, although a revised 767 could be a possible stopgap measure. Estimates suggested that developing and building a new aircraft could reach US$15 billion.

=== 2016 ===
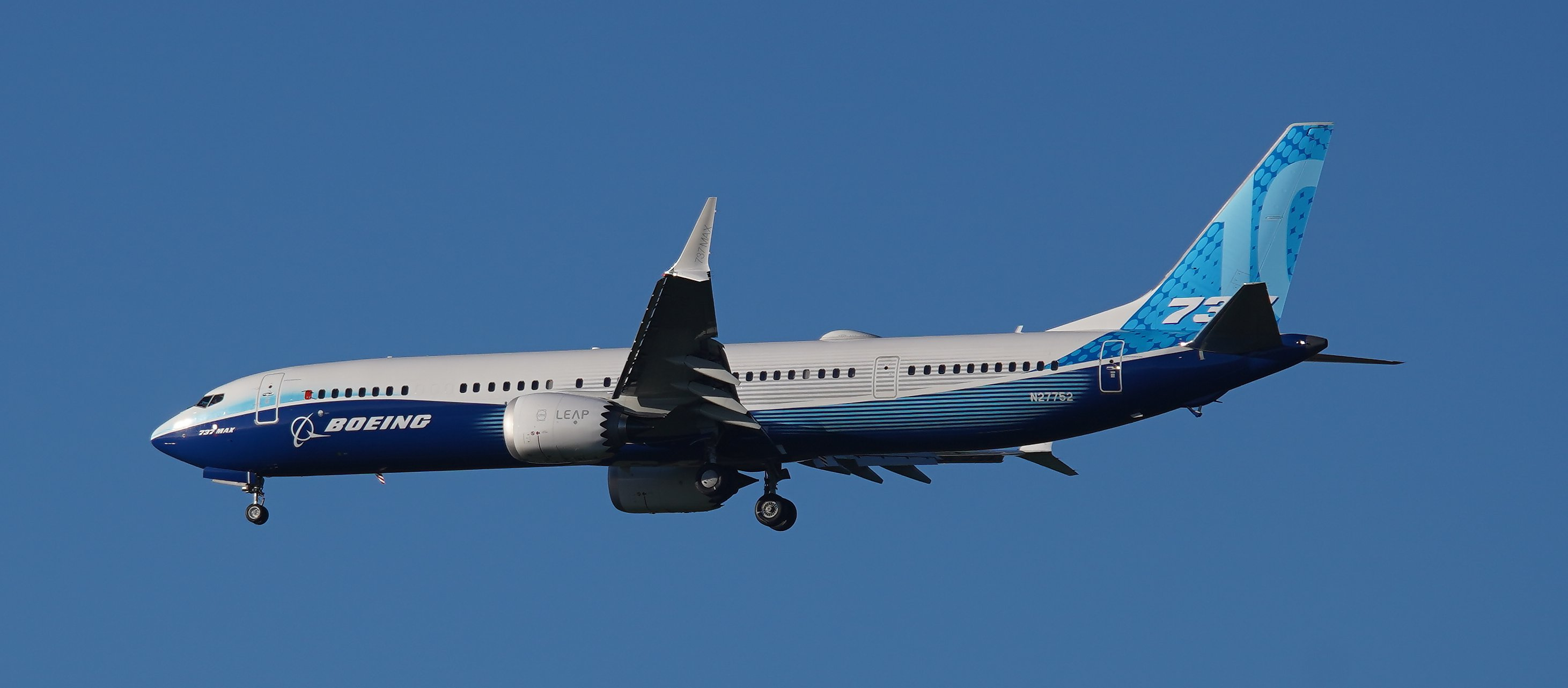
The 737 MAX 10 remained the largest and heaviest Boeing 737 variant ever and is likely ended up the ultimate development of its family. Yet to be certified to enter commercial service as of 2025, the MAX 10 still has considerable operating range disadvantage comparing to its direct competitor Airbus A321neo, especially with the A321LR and A321XLR.

In early 2016, Boeing's two options remained a larger 737 MAX variant or an all-new 797 design. The MOM was the subject of a session of the 2016 International Society of Transport Aircraft Trading (ISTAT) conference in Phoenix, Arizona where major worldwide sellers, buyers and financiers of commercial aircraft meet. Airbus sales chief John Leahy said the industry has no need for a new midmarket airplane, since the Airbus A321neo is already for sale.

In July 2016, Boeing forecast demand for 4,000 to 5,000 midmarket aircraft, leaving a market for 2,000 to 3,000 after accounting for the Airbus A321neo and A330neo sales. It identified the market "sweet spot" for the NMA as being a 200 to 250-seat twin-aisle aircraft with more than 4,000 nmi (7,400 km) range, but less expensive to operate than existing small twin aisles. The notional aircraft, which would enter service in the middle of the next decade, would need advanced 40,000–45,000 lbf (180–200 kN) high-bypass turbofans with higher pressure ratios. Boeing development resources were committed on the 777X, 787-10 and 737 MAX, whereas Airbus's R&D spending profile appeared to leave room for new development, but Airbus believed that the A321LR and A330neo were sufficient to address the segment.

=== 2017 ===
At the March 2017 ISTAT Americas conference, United Airlines' interest in the NMA was confirmed by chief financial officer Andrew Levy, who corroborated the assumption that it would be a twin-aisle aircraft with two variants, carrying 225 to 260 passengers with a range of 4,800 to 5,200 nmi (8,900 to 9,600 km). Multiple airlines expressed potential interest: Alaska Airlines, Emirates, and Delta Air Lines for transatlantic flights.

The new airplane was expected to have seven-abreast seating, like the 767. The market favors single-aisle economics, and Boeing's challenge would be to achieve comparable hourly cost and price per seat while keeping twin-aisle capabilities. Competition to supply the engines would be intense, with Rolls-Royce expected to propose the UltraFan follow-on to its Advance engines, Pratt & Whitney offering a new iteration of its Pratt & Whitney Geared Turbofan, and CFM International also in the running.

To assess where the "middle of the market" lay, Flight Ascend Consultancy looked at existing twin-aisle aircraft with fewer than 260 seats and found that these offered an average of 234 seats and have an average flight distance of 2,670 nmi, with 60% of available seat miles below 4,000 nmi and 82% below 5,000 nmi. To be competitive, NMA pricing would have to be between the 787-8 and A330neo at $100–120 million (base full-life value) and larger single-aisles at above $50 million; the 767-300ER in its heyday cost just over $70 million. An elliptical cross-section could combine a twin-aisle cabin with the reduced cargo space of a single-aisle jet to reduce aerodynamic drag and operating costs, but would need more complex carbon composites instead of a simple cylindrical metal fuselage.

Boeing relies on model-based systems engineering (MBSE), already used in its defense and space businesses, to define customer needs and functionality early in the aircraft design process with an interdisciplinary approach. A systems architecture model feeds and interacts with analytic and verification models, and helps define the product to bound data management and control cost and schedule, and the constraints, interfaces and requirements. Engine integration defines takeoff and climb capability, aircraft noise and ETOPS range circumference and engine failure altitude.

Silhouettes of Boeing NMA concept at right between 787-8 on top and 737 MAX 10 on bottom, as presented at Paris Air Show 2017

At the June 2017 Paris Air Show, Boeing's aircraft development manager Mike Delaney confirmed the use of composites for the whole airframe, which would have a hybrid cross-section and bypass ratios above 10:1. If the NMA were to be launched in early 2019, its design would be completed in 2020, with fabrication in 2021–22, build in 2023, flight tests and certification in 2024 and introduction in 2025.

With the NMA planned for introduction no earlier than 2025, and the 787 being much larger, Boeing could conceivably restart passenger 767-300ER production to bridge the gap, with potential demand for 50 to 60 aircraft. In September, Boeing created a development program office, and in November named their company veteran and 777X chief project engineer Terry Beezhold, without a role yet. Its introduction could slip from 2024–25 to 2027, pushing the 737 replacement to after 2030.

On 20 December 2017, Washington Governor Jay Inslee formed a committee with Boeing labor unions (International Association of Machinists (IAM) and Society of Professional Engineering Employees in Aerospace (SPEEA)) and local government economic-development officials to lobby Boeing to build the NMA in Washington state. Boeing continued to estimate middle-of-the-market demand at between 2,000 and 4,000 airliners over 20 years, stating in September 2017 that it was closer to 4,000, while Pratt & Whitney, Rolls-Royce plc and Leeham Co. think it likely to lie between 2,000 and 2,500; Airbus puts the figure at about 2,000 aircraft, not enough to justify a new $15bn development program for aircraft to be sold for $55m to $75m each.

=== 2018 ===
2018 early design rendering

In early 2018, United saw the NMA reach the market in eight to ten years. GE Aviation expected a launch decision in 2018 in order to enter service on target in the mid-2020s. Boeing was in "active" talks with about 50 potential customers and had defined two main versions: a 225-seat model with a 5,000 nmi (9,300 km) range and a 275-seat version with a 4,500 nmi (8,300 km) range.

Delta Air Lines hoped to be a launch customer for the NMA, which would replace its 757 and 767 fleets. In February 2018, Delta operated 127 757s and 80 767s with average ages of 15 to 22 years. Boeing's VP Marketing Randy Tinseth was confident its forecast of 4,000 aircraft can be met, despite others seeing the market as between 2,000 and 2,500, because the NMA would be able to change airline networks in the same way that the 787 enabled 170 new routes to be opened since 2011. Solid production costs and sales forecasts would be required to convince the Boeing board to commit to its development. Avolon saw a market for 3,500 to 4,000 airliners. At the 2018 Farnborough Airshow, GE Aviation expressed concern as to whether the size of the market was large enough to justify the investment of developing a new engine for the jet.

The NMA was targeted to achieve a 30% economic improvement over the Boeing 757/767. Tinseth said the NMA would generate 30% more revenue than narrowbodies and have 40% lower trip costs compared to the widebodies it would replace (767, A300 and A330). Within its range, it would be significantly more economical than the A330neo, severely testing its sales if Boeing could keep NMA prices in the $70m range. The target sale price for the NMA was believed to be between $65m and $75m. Ryanair CEO Michael O'Leary, kept informed by Boeing, said its seat cost would be substantially higher than the 737 MAX.

The conceptual design released in early 2018 had a 737 MAX-style tail cone, large 787/777X-sized cabin windows, a 757/767/777-style windscreen, a 767-200 door arrangement and short engine inlets. As the A320/A330 investment has been amortized, the A321LR or A330neo could be offered at a lower cost; the NMA would have to offer notably lower fuel and maintenance cost. Airbus could react with an A321 stretch or an all-new design, and could use a new 50,000 lbf (222.5 kN) engine.

As recent all-new designs took between 88 and 101 months (7.3 to 8.4 years) between the authority to offer and the introduction, late 2018 to early 2019 launch would have implied a 2026 service entry. At this time, existing airliners over 30 years old will have been replaced by current models, leaving 900 aircraft aged from 15 to 25 years to be replaced: 420 A321s, 270 A330-200s, 90 757s and 130 767s. The largest operator of these 15-to-25-year-old mid-market types is American Airlines with over 80, followed by China Southern then Delta Air Lines, United Airlines, Air China and Turkish Airlines with less than 40. In June the NMA-6X was defined as a 228-passenger, 5,000 nmi (9,300 km) airliner and the NMA-7X would seat 267 in two classes over 4,200 nmi (7,800 km).

ICF International saw a market of 3,000–3,500 over 20 years with the NMA sold for $75–80 m, while Collateral Verifications believed in a 1,000–1,500 market and an $80–90 m price; for Flightglobal's Ascend, 1,500 NMAs could have been delivered for $67–82 m each between 2025 and 2040 if its size was right, and Oriel Consult expected a $70–80 m price. For Steven F. Udvar-Házy, a decision should be made by mid 2019, with two potential engines derived from existing units. Boeing continued to assess the market as 4,000-5,000 aircraft and was working towards a 2019 decision too, while taking measures to protect a 2025 introduction into service.

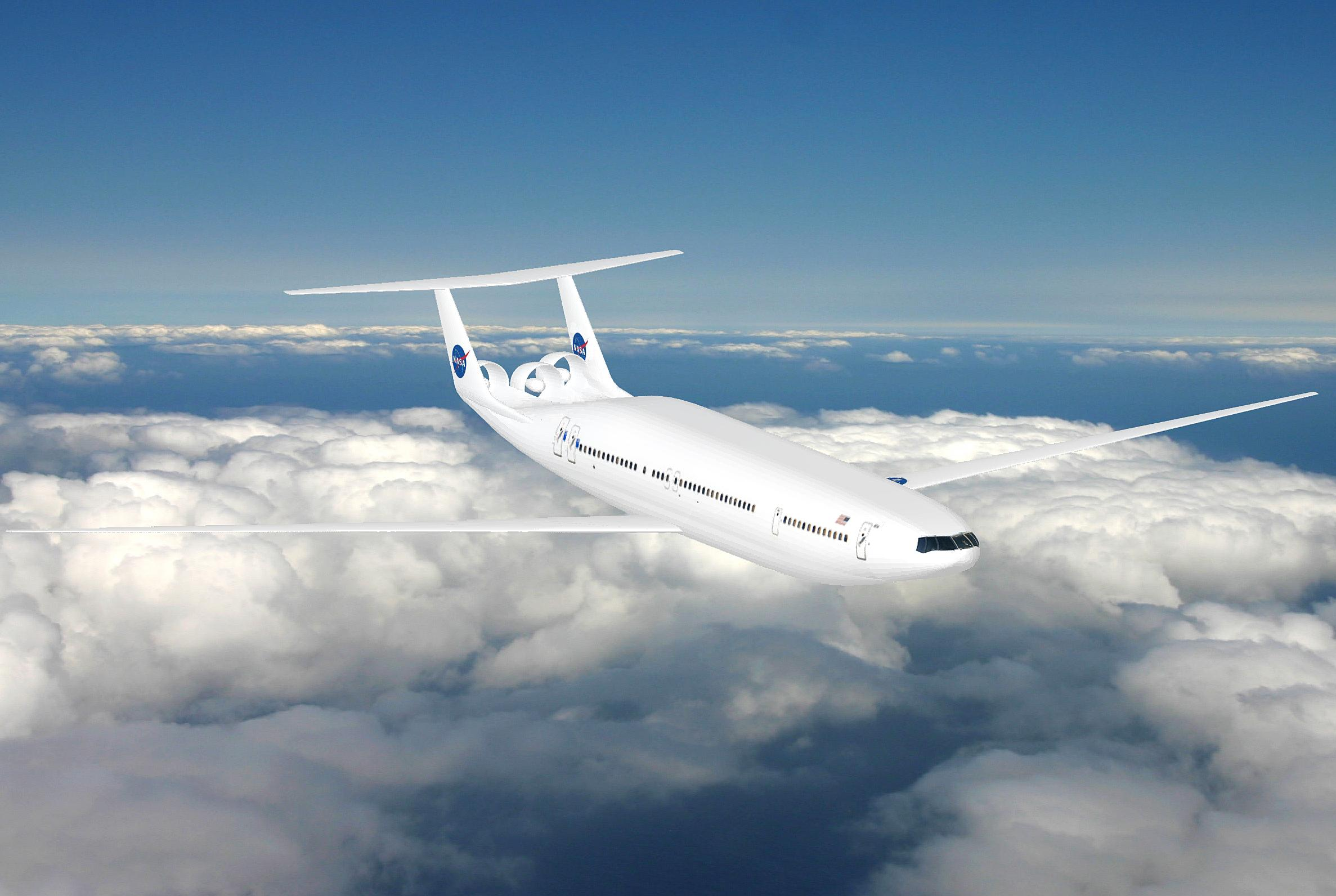
The Aurora D8 concept has a double bubble fuselage.

According to the French National Aerospace Research Center, ONERA, a cylindrical seven or eight-abreast twin-aisle has 20% more fuselage drag in cruise than a six-abreast, single-aisle airplane of the same seat capacity. This is significant because fuselage drag is one-third of total drag. However, an elliptical widebody can have an equivalent drag due to a smaller wetted area. Also, a twin-aisle is more comfortable and has faster turnarounds than a single-aisle. A cylindrical section is the simplest way to cope with the cabin pressurization's hoop stress while an elliptical section is reinforced and heavier (less so with vertical rods like the Aurora D8 concept).

In October 2018, analysts from Sanford C. Bernstein, Morgan Stanley and Canaccord Genuity were convinced Boeing would launch the project. Boeing's Randy Tinseth stated an almost unanimous preference for better economics through weight savings rather than the heavier structure to carry widebody containers.

=== 2019 ===
By early 2019, Rolls-Royce was anticipating an addressable market for 4,000 to 5,000 middle-of-the-market aircraft over 20 years, agreeing with Boeing's figures, and pointed out that Boeing would not capture all of that market; it expected demand for the NMA to reach 2,000 to 3,000 aircraft. Former Airbus sales executive John Leahy suggested that Boeing should create a new single-aisle aircraft to compete with the Airbus A321neo from 2030 instead of a small widebody.

On January 30, 2019, then-Boeing CEO Dennis Muilenburg clarified that whether to offer the NMA for sale would be decided later in the year, before an authority to launch decision deferred until 2020, aligned with the end of 777X development and enabling the NMA to build on 777X work. The two-stage decision process is standard at Boeing and entry into service was still targeted for 2025, but the delay could cause 757 replacement opportunities to be missed. Boeing intended to leverage existing technologies such as composites for the NMA. The program would overhaul supply chain practices and focus on more efficient production, support and maintenance that could also be applied to a future 737 replacement.

In February 2019, Rolls-Royce plc abandoned its engine proposal, leaving CFM International and Pratt & Whitney as sole competitors. A new development would not be mature enough as the Ultrafan program is too far away from Boeing's needs, but Rolls-Royce could be interested in a partnership with another manufacturer.

The chief executive of GE Aviation, for the second year in a row, expressed skepticism regarding the size of the market for the jet.

In June 2019, following the launch of the Airbus A321XLR, Boeing was understood to be prioritizing the 275-seat variant, tentatively dubbed NMA-7X, ahead of the 225-seat NMA-6X which would compete more directly with the A321XLR. A formal authority to offer decision was still expected later in 2019. The two prospective engine suppliers were understood to be bidding on a sole-supplier basis, believing that market demand would not allow two competing engines to achieve a timely return on investment, whereas Air Lease Corporation's Steven Udvar-Házy felt that buyers should have a choice. Udvar-Házy also suggested that the NMA should be designed with future changes in mind, such as the possibility of single-pilot operation.

In July 2019, Boeing stated that its priority was the safe return to service of the grounded 737 MAX, and that the decision to launch the NMA would depend partly on its confidence in the tools it intends to implement in order to improve development program performance.

In September 2019, Airbus estimated the total addressable market for midsize aircraft to represent some 2,000 to 2,500 jets over the next 20 years, and noted that it would be "taking the early market" in this space with the A321XLR and high-density A321 configurations, and with the A330neo.

Considered 767-XF concept

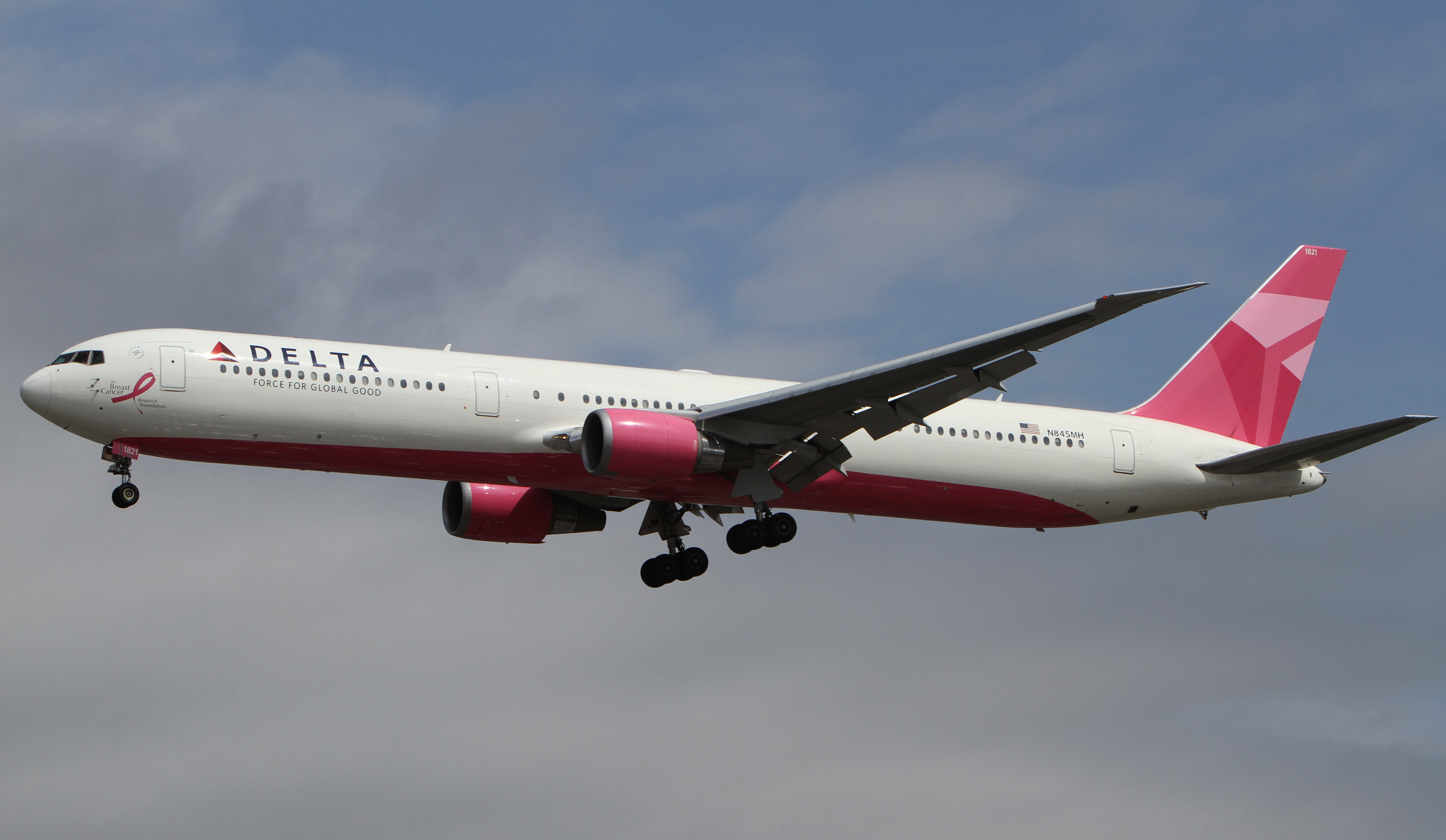
The 767-400 is the largest and currently the latest commercial version of the existing 767 series.

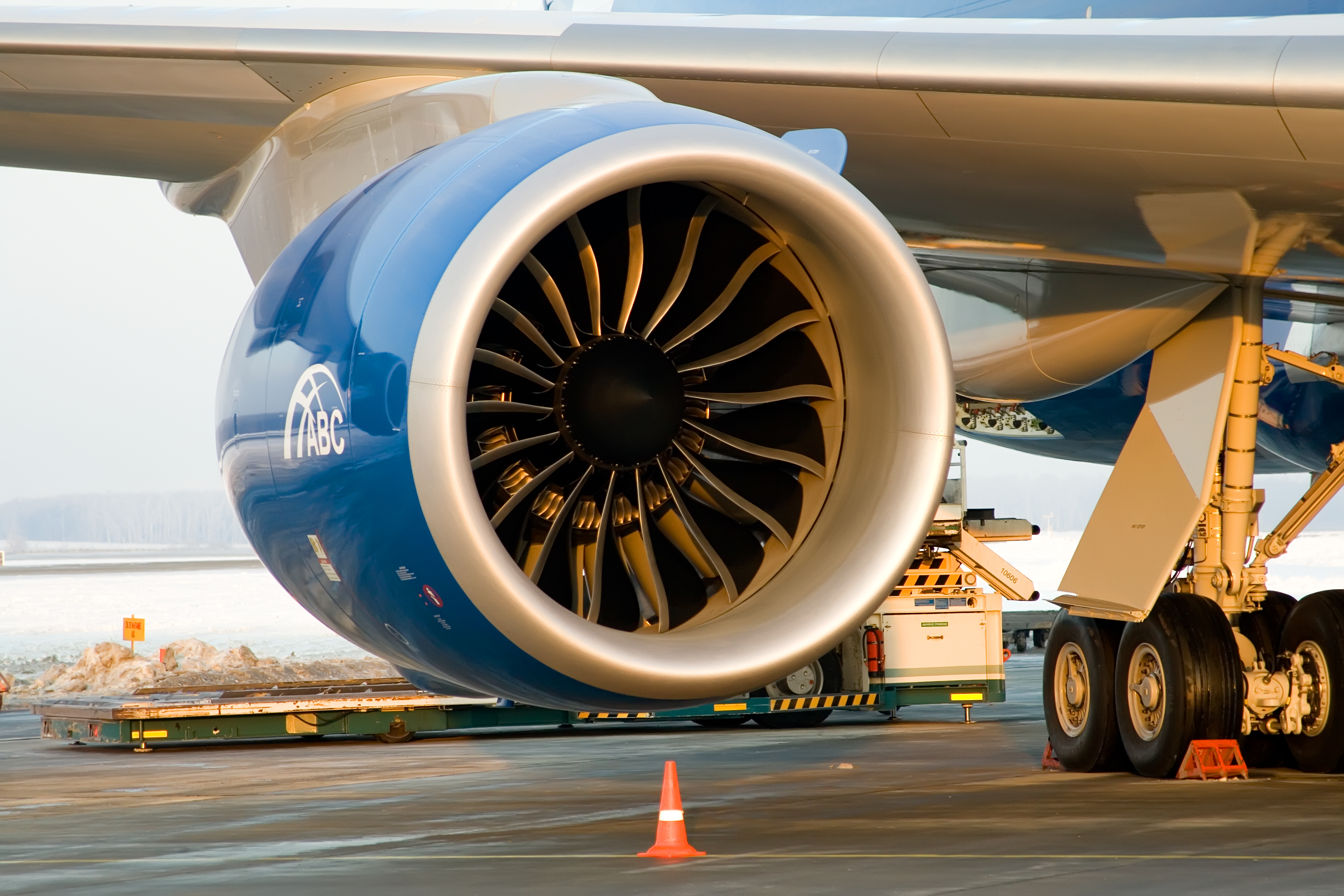
A new-generation General Electric GEnx engine

By October, Boeing was studying a re-engined 767-XF for around 2025, based on the 767-400ER with an extended landing gear to accommodate General Electric GEnx turbofans. The cargo market was the main target, but a passenger version could be a less expensive alternative to the proposed NMA. Some airlines and lessors touted as NMA customers had been pushing Boeing to focus instead on a narrow-body aircraft, dubbed the Future Small Airplane (FSA), to replace the 737 MAX, and cast doubt on whether the NMA would be launched.

In December, United Airlines placed an order for 50 A321XLRs to replace its aging fleet of 757s, its first narrow-body Airbus order since 2006, but stated that this did not rule out consideration of the NMA in the future. Analysts Richard Aboulafia and Rob Morris both believed that, although it would be a strong contender to replace the 767, the chances of a wide-body NMA being launched were diminishing in favour of a narrow-body aircraft that would compete more directly with the A321XLR.

=== 2020 ===
On 22 January 2020, Boeing's new chief executive David Calhoun announced a clean sheet reevaluation of the project, as the company focused on existing products and the market shifted away after Airbus launched the popular A321XLR in 2019. Boeing also noted its realization, following the 737 MAX crashes, that any new design must focus on the flight control system and how pilots interact with the aircraft.

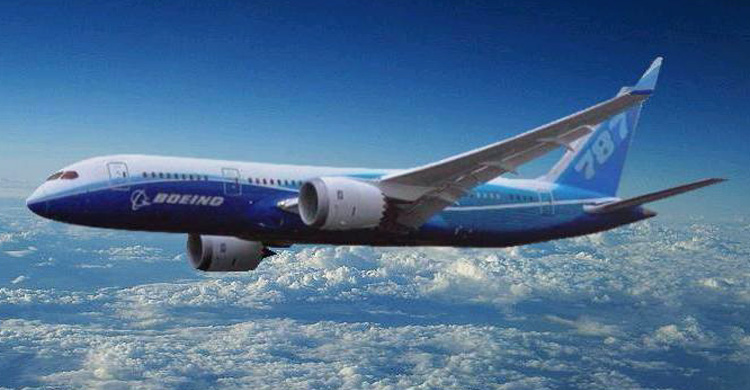
The 787-3 is an abandoned variant of the Boeing 787 Dreamliner family, being equivalently sized to a 787-8 but was adjusted for shorter flights.

Boeing ordered a new study to assess the future market and the kind of aircraft that could meet that market, effectively shelving its current plan. Boeing was losing market share to the 200 to 240-seat Airbus A321 in particular, which targets a similar segment of the market to the NMA. The delay to the NMA launch had already put a key part of the target market at risk for Boeing, particularly after Airbus won contracts with two major U.S. airlines. Analysts also questioned if Boeing had the appetite for the expense of the NMA project as it faced "costs equivalent to a new program to repair the MAX crisis" and delays on the 777X program. One option postulated for Boeing would be to revive the 787-3, a 787 variant optimized for short-haul use.

=== 2021 ===
By early 2021, Boeing was studying a shorter -5X variant to compete with the Airbus A321XLR as a 757-200/300 successor with a range of 5,000 nmi (9,300 km). A smaller 225-seat variant of the previous NMA twin-aisle design with composite wings and fuselage, it would reuse existing structures, systems and engine technology to target production costs comparable to single-aisle aircraft. It would be powered by derated versions of the higher-bypass ratio 50,000 lbf (220 kN) engines proposed by CFM International and by Pratt & Whitney, while Rolls-Royce plc may be able to reconsider its withdrawal from bidding. Boeing could spend $2–3 billion a year for the development, up to $25 billion, as a potential go-ahead in 2022 or 2023 could lead to a late 2020s service entry.

Analysts estimate that narrow-body aircraft will account for around 70% of sales by 2025, and believe a clean-sheet NMA to be essential for Boeing to avoid losing market share to Airbus, and to the A321neo in particular. Airbus could attain a 60% overall market share, yet analysts believe Boeing is unlikely to launch a new mid-market aircraft.

=== 2022 ===
In June 2022, Boeing indicated that it would not pursue development of the NMA for "at least a couple of years", until significant progress has been made on the next generation of engines and until new digital development tools are sufficiently mature.

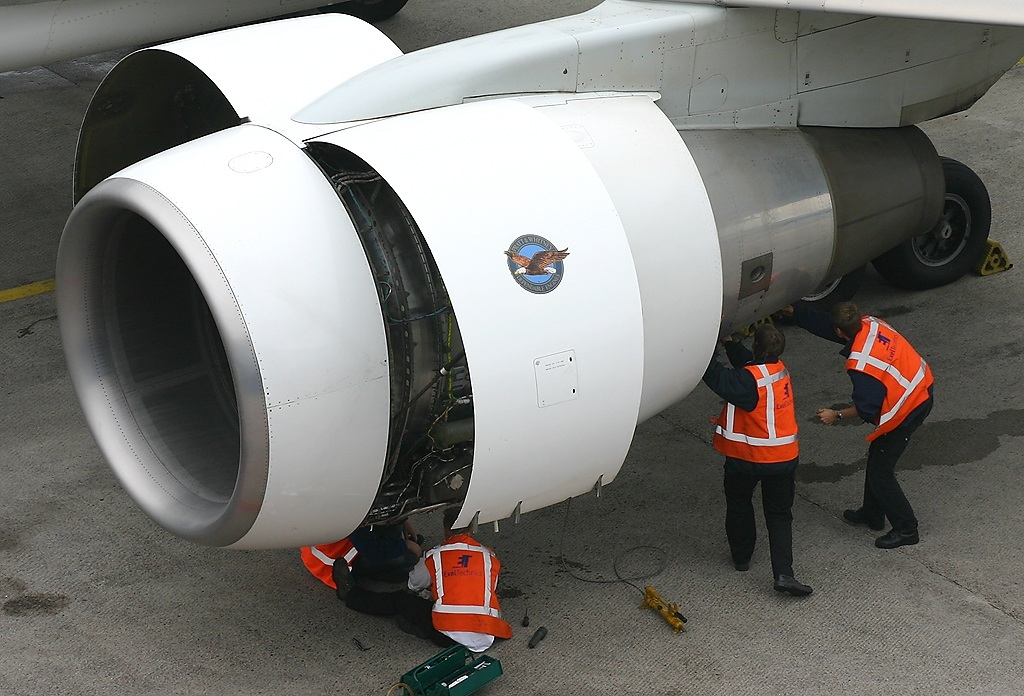
There is currently no modern engine solution available to directly replace the 200 kilonewtons (45,000 lbf)-class PW2000 (pictured) and RB211 that power the 757.

== Engines ==
The engine selection process is reminiscent of the competition to power the 777-200LR/300ER at the end of the 1990s, which shaped the turbofan market for the subsequent years. Rolls-Royce proposed the Trent 8104 growth demonstrator, Pratt & Whitney proposed a scaled-up PW6000 (wanting to limit the competition to two suppliers), while GE won exclusivity with the GE90-115B performance and GECAS 777 orders. Rolls-Royce obtained the same exclusivity for the A350 and later the A330neo, pushing P&W out of the widebody engine market and precipitating its narrowbody comeback with the PW1000G.

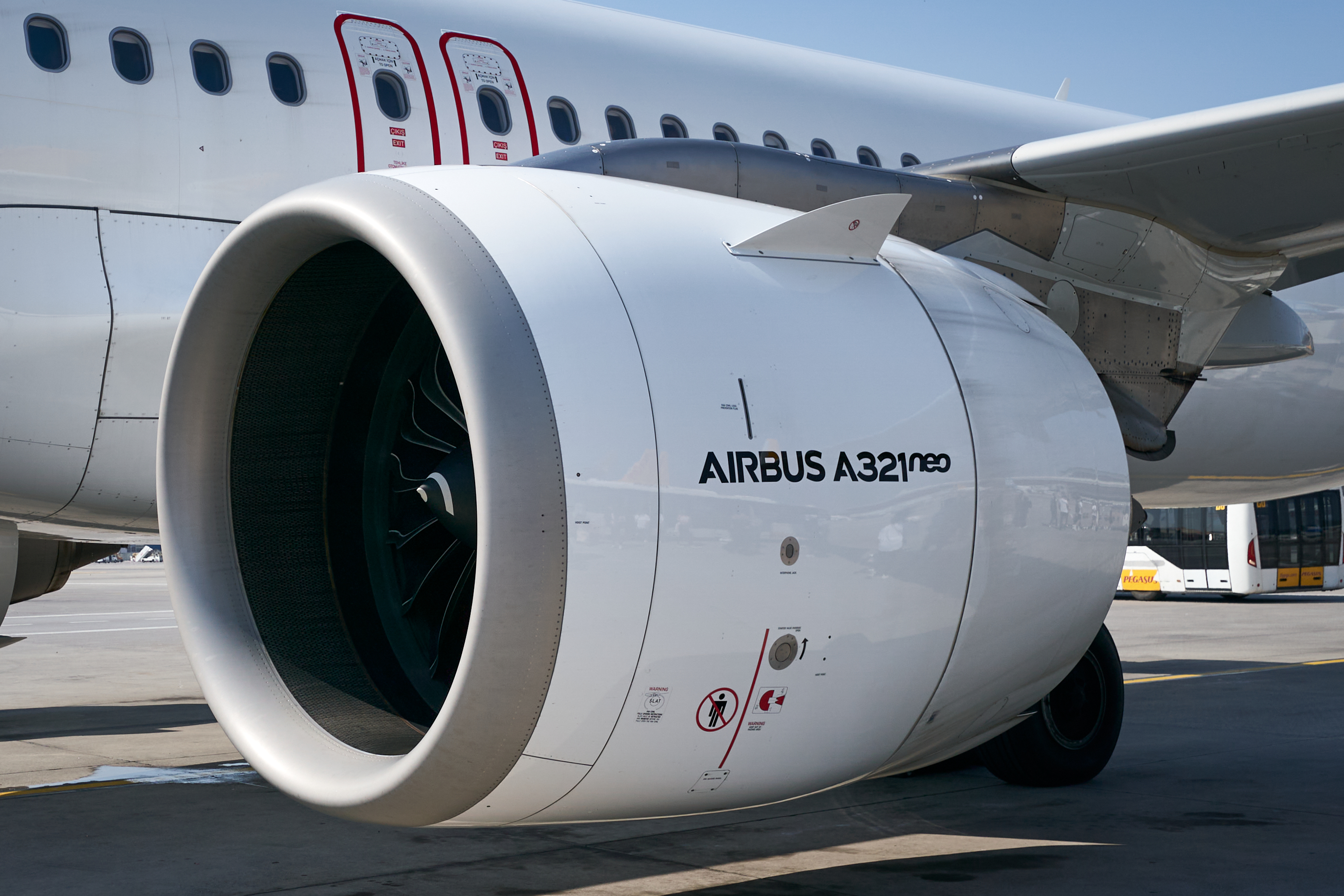
The engines on the new Airbus A321neo - including A321XLR and being currently the largest narrowbody aircraft in production - are certified at less than 150 kilonewtons (34,000 lbf). That being said, the A321 is a much smaller and lighter platform than the 757-200, being intended for shorter-ranged operations.

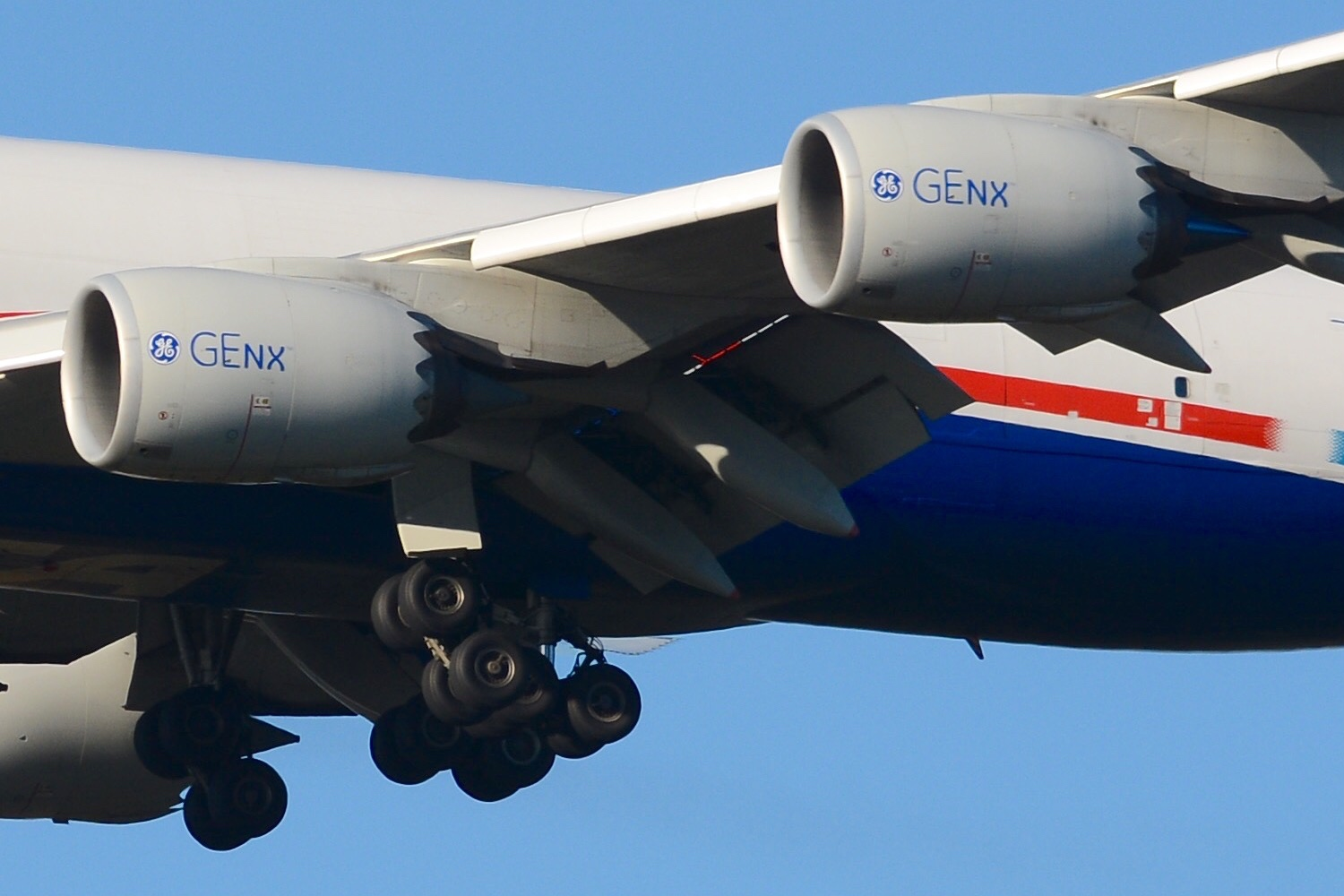
The GENx-2B - exclusively powering the Boeing 747-8 - is cited as a feasible available option to re-engine and modernize the existing Boeing 767 platform. However, with a certified thrust of 300 kilonewtons (67,000 lbf), it is significantly overpowered for virtually all narrowbody NMA concepts.

The 45,000 lbf (200 kN) thrust was typical of the 1960s' first generation of high-bypass-ratio turbofans: the GE CF6 for Douglas DC-10, the Rolls RB211 for Lockheed Tristar, and the Pratt & Whitney JT9D for Boeing 747. This market was quickly left behind as aircraft and their power requirements grew, leaving the RB211 for Boeing 757 (until 2005), or the Pratt PW2000 for Boeing C-17. Newer technology enabled 10:1 or more bypass ratios and overall pressure ratios of at least 50:1 at top of climb. This level of thrust is above modern CFM LEAP or Pratt PW1000G single-aisle engines, but well below Rolls-Royce Trent or GEnx widebody ones.

It falls below the 50,000 lbf (220 kN) limit for CFM International, and thus a scaled-down GE9X core could fit a new low-pressure system. Pratt could reach it by growing from the 33,000 lbf (150 kN) PW1133G for the A321neo. Rolls could propose its UltraFan development, a geared turbofan based its new Advance core, but it is primarily focused on its larger, 100,000 lbf (440 kN) engine. The GTF cost more than $10 billion to develop, and RR was facing financial difficulties which could be accelerated by being left out of the EU Clean Sky initiative as a result of Brexit. Both could join together, but have historically been moving in the opposite direction, as Rolls sold its 32.5% stake in International Aero Engines to Pratt parent United Technologies in 2011, essentially selling the ghost of the geared IAE SuperFan proposed for the A340 (supplanted in 1987 by the CFM56).

CFM International has also considered geared turbofan architecture for the prospective aircraft. GE has expressed that it does not believe the market is large enough for all three suppliers and will not enter a three-way race which would not justify the investment needed–as was the case for the A330's engines–leaving Boeing's NMA with two suppliers at most.

Boeing has not yet decided whether it will use a single engine type: CFM considers an all-new direct-drive engine, and Rolls-Royce proposes its Advance direct-drive engine before 2025 and its UltraFan geared design after, scalable from 25,000 to 110,000 lbf (110 to 490 kN). As a new engine development costs US$2.5 to $3 billion, GE has to evaluate its market opportunities, preferring a single-source for a low-volume airplane while Airbus would potentially need such an engine. GE Aviation's offer would be through CFM, with the LEAP as the baseline for a bigger engine, half a generation further, with advanced but mature enough technology.

Boeing issued a request for proposals (RFP) with a June 27, 2018 deadline for a 45,000 lbf (200 kN) engine with a thrust specific fuel consumption (TSFC) 25% lower than the 757's engines. At least two engine-makers want exclusivity for the $2 billion program cost. Even if its thrust crept to 52,000 lbf (230 kN), GE and Safran will bid through their CFM joint venture with a 3D-woven-resin transfer molding fan like the Leap instead of a GEnx/GE9X-type carbon-fiber composite.

In 2025, the United States Air Force announced that it looks for new generation turbofans in the 35,000–52,000 lbf (160–230 kN) sector, which may encourage developments of new engines in this neglected sector and eventually assist Boeing's NMA ambitions.

== See also ==
- Boeing New Large Airplane
- Boeing Yellowstone Project
