= Middle-market =

Middle-market can refer to:

- Middle-market newspaper
- Middle-market company

== See also ==
- Middle of the market, the airliner market between the narrowbody and the widebody aircraft
- Mid-Market, San Francisco, a neighborhood and development area
