= Aurora D8 =

Airliner concept

D8
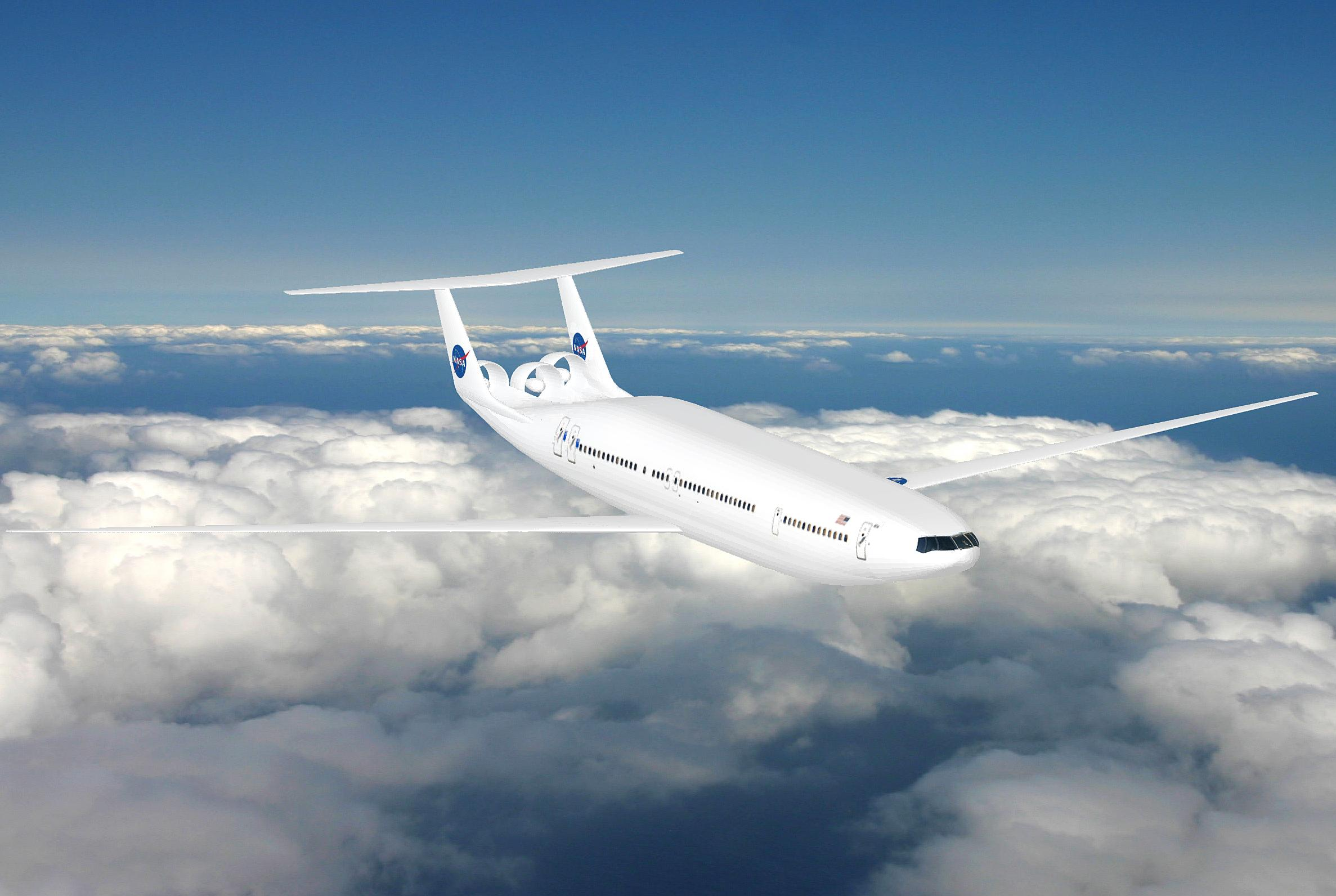
- NASA / Aurora D8 airliner concept

General information
- Type: Wide-body jet airliner concept
- National origin: United States
- Manufacturer: Aurora Flight Sciences
- Designer: Mark Drela
- Status: Development and testing

The Aurora D8, also known as the D8 Airliner, is an airliner concept under development as of mid 2017. The project was initiated in 2008 by Aurora Flight Sciences, the Massachusetts Institute of Technology (MIT) and Pratt & Whitney under NASA's sponsorship of $2.9 million (£2.19 million).

Aurora is refining the fuel-efficient D8 designed for NASA by MIT, and originally hoped to fly a half-scale demonstrator in 2022. The 180-seat, 3,000-nautical-mile-range (5,600 km; 3,500 mi) airliner is designed to fly at 582 mph (937 km/h; 506 kn) within the capabilities of the Boeing 737 or Airbus A320 and could be in test service by 2027 at the earliest and 2035 at the latest.

Aurora Flight Sciences was purchased by Boeing on November 8, 2017, for their drone developments. The subsidiary is intended to accelerate Boeing's development of autonomous technology.

== Design ==
The side-by-side "double bubble" fuselage provides additional lift along the nose section, meaning smaller wings can be used to generate lift, which reduces drag. The wider fuselage is meant to lead to faster turnaround as well. The mounting of the engines at the rear end of the D8 instead of below the wings used in conventional aircraft design allows reduction of thrust requirements by minimizing inefficiency from boundary layer ingestion (BLI).

However, the chassis features less radical than competing blended wing body concepts without modifying existing airport infrastructure and BLI. The original goal was to reduce fuel burn by 70% and noise by 71 dB by flying at Mach 0.74, but a more traditional Mach 0.82 wing and fuselage growth resulted in a more-conservative 49% fuel burn reduction and 40 EPNdB noise reduction against a Boeing 737-800.

=== Engines ===
Clustering the engines together atop the wide tail of a flattened fuselage under a "π tail" enables them to reenergize the slow-moving boundary layer over the fuselage to increase efficiency, and allow a clean, low drag, high aspect ratio wing. Starting with slower flow, the reduction in exhaust velocity increases the propulsive efficiency with a similar specific thrust. By ingesting and reenergizing the boundary layer flow, BLI reduces by 40% in the D8 the wasted kinetic energy in the combined high-velocity jet exhaust and slow-speed wake behind the fuselage. Large-scale wind-tunnel testing with NASA showed a power-saving from BLI from 8.4% with the same jet nozzle area to 10.4% with the same mass flow. The BLI benefit is an order of magnitude more than the loss from ingesting distorted boundary-layer flow.

A large fan size is needed to exceed a 20:1 bypass ratio. Developed by United Technologies Research Center, a distortion-tolerant fan was scale tested at NASA and coped with flow distortion from ingesting the boundary layer close to the upper fuselage surface. As a compact core limits blade tip clearances issues due to bending but cannot house the fan to low-pressure turbine driveshaft, Pratt & Whitney turned the core backwards, similar to PT6 arrangement, with hot gas discharged forward through a low-pressure power turbine connected to the fan via a short shaft and a gearbox. To avoid the risk of an uncontained engine failure causing the second engine to fail, the cores are angled by 50° since they are no longer mechanically linked to the fan, with low pressure losses since only the core flow is turned. Not connected to the power section, the core can be disassembled for maintenance.

== Related concepts ==
The Nova concept from the French aerospace research lab Onera uses a similar set of features (wide lifting fuselage, BLI propulsion) in an effort to gain similar fuel savings, with a proposed capacity of 180 passengers over 3,000 nautical miles at Mach 0.85. However, it uses a more conventional T-tail, resulting in the engines needing to be placed on the sides of the fuselage.

== See also ==
- Frigate Ecojet
- Middle of the market
- Boeing New Midsize Airplane
- Boeing X-66
