= Middle of the market =

Segment of airline market

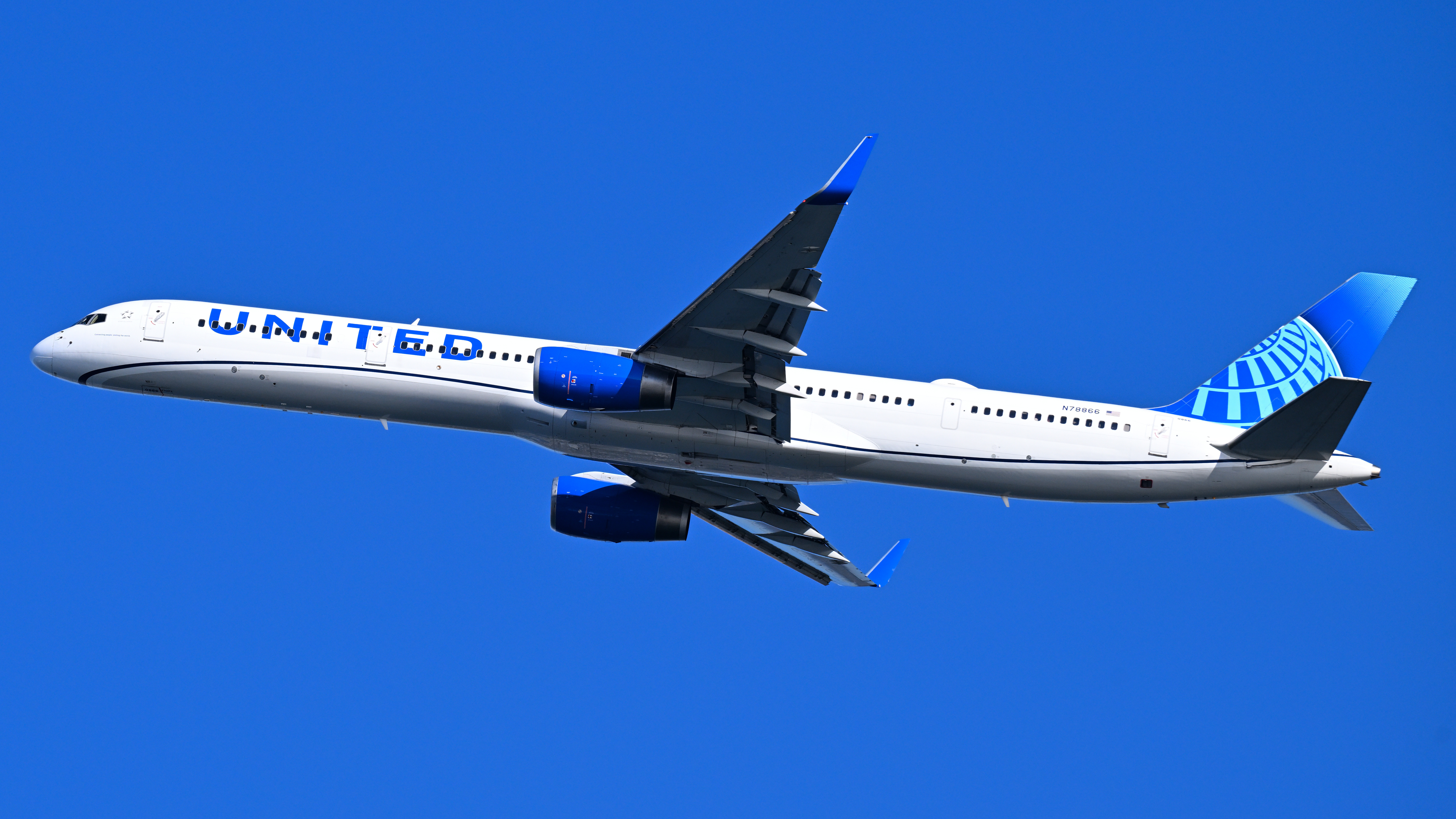
The Boeing 757-300 is one of the largest narrowbody aircraft ever, having capacity approaching some widebody designs.

The middle of the market, often abbreviated MoM, is the airliner market between the narrowbody and the widebody aircraft, a market segmentation used by Boeing Commercial Airplanes since at least 2003. Both Airbus and Boeing produce aircraft that serve this segment.

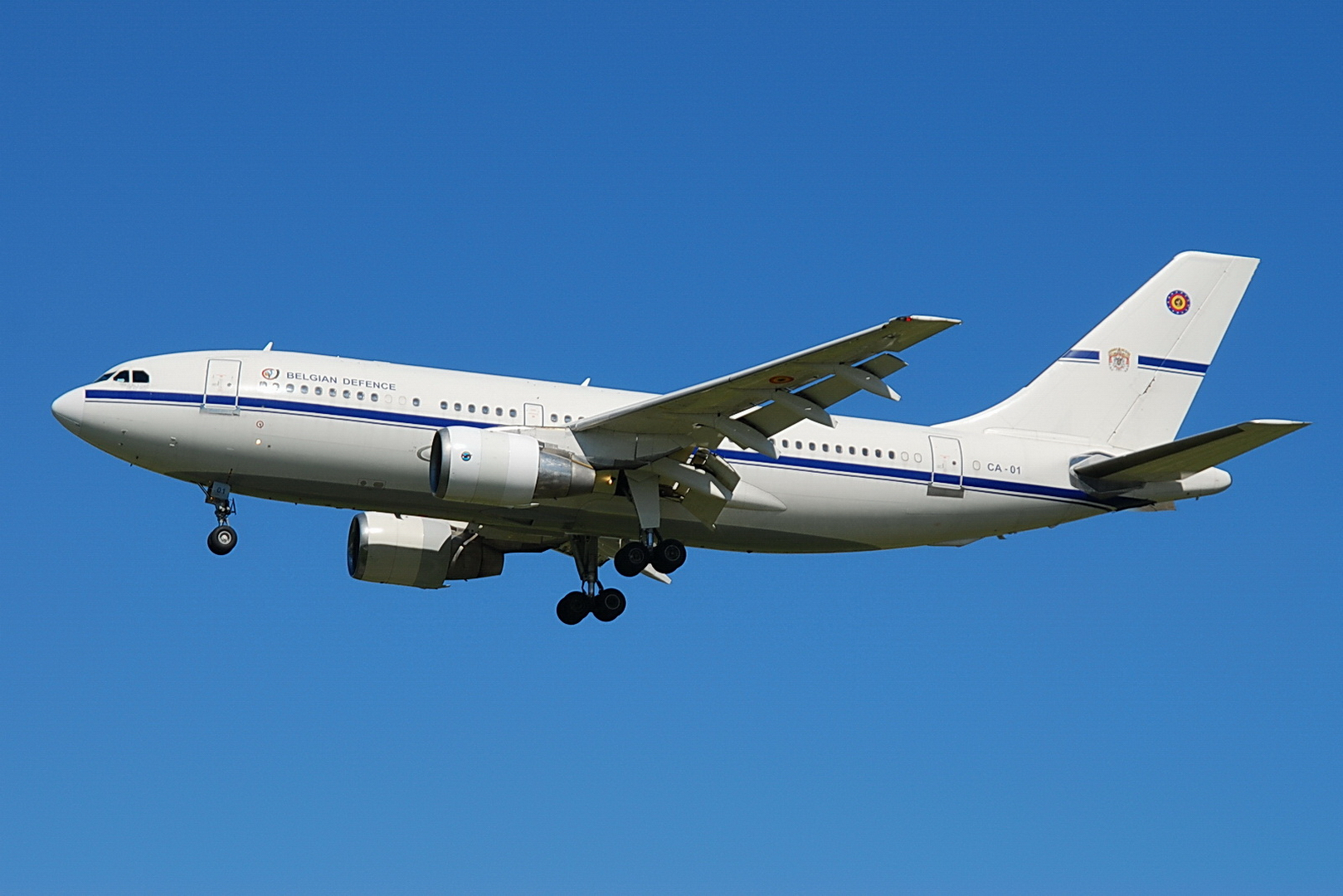
The Airbus A310-200 is virtually the smallest widebody aircraft ever.

In the Boeing lineup, it is between the largest Boeing 737 MAX 10 of less than 198,000 lb (90 t) of maximum takeoff weight (MTOW) for 204 passengers in two classes over a 3,100 nmi (5,700 km) range, and the smallest Boeing 787-8 of 502,500 lb (227.9 t) for 242 passengers in a 2-class configuration over a 7,355 nmi (13,621 km) range. It was previously covered by Boeing with the largest modern narrowbody, the Boeing 757, typically the -200 for 200 passengers over 3,915 nmi (7,251 km) with a 255,000 lb (116 t) MTOW, and the smallest widebody, the seven-abreast Boeing 767, typically the -300ER for 269 passengers over 5,725 nmi (10,603 km) with a 412,000 lb (187 t) MTOW.

In the Airbus lineup, it is between the A321XLR of 101 t (223,000 lb) of MTOW for 206 passengers in two classes over a 4,700 nmi (8,700 km) range, and the A330-800 of 251 t (553,000 lb) for 257 passengers in three classes over a 8,100 nmi (15,000 km) range. Historically, Airbus's MoM sector was covered by the Airbus A310, which is the shortened derivative of the Airbus A300 and was positioned at the lowest end of the widebody sector. However, unlike the Boeing 757 and 767, the A310 was never a commercial success and quickly perished from revenue services, being superseded by its larger and newer sister, the Airbus A330.

== Boeing Y1 project ==
In 2006, Boeing was evaluating a successor for the Boeing 737 in the 100–200 seat market within the Boeing Yellowstone Project as the Y1. In 2008, ILFC's Steven Udvar-Hazy told Boeing to develop a midrange 787 derivative, between the 787-8 and 787-3 and industry consultant Richard Aboulafia observed it would be a good replacement for the Boeing 767-300ER. In 2011, Boeing focused its studies on an aircraft slightly larger than the 145 to 180-seat 737 Next Generation and ruled out developing a bigger 200 seat 757-sized replacement.

== Boeing New Light Twin (NLT) ==
The Boeing New Light Twin (NLT) concept in 2011 was a small, seven-abreast twin-aisle adapted for low-profile LD3-45W containers.

In 2011, Boeing was conceptualising a New Light Twin (NLT), a twin-aisle smaller than the 767 with a seven-abreast (2-3-2) economy seating and small LD3-45W containers, as it can be seen in the illustrating picture. The NLT-300ER would have been 148 ft (45 m) long to accommodate 204 seats over 4,500 nmi (8,300 km), while the 208 in (5.3 m) longer NLT-400 would cover 3,100 nmi (5,700 km) with 241 passengers. Both would have been powered by 37,000 lbf (160 kN) engines with a 84 in (2.1 m) fan, and would have had a 143 ft (44 m) wide, 2,000 sq ft (190 m^{2}) wing designed for a Mach .8 cruise.

== Boeing 737 MAX ==
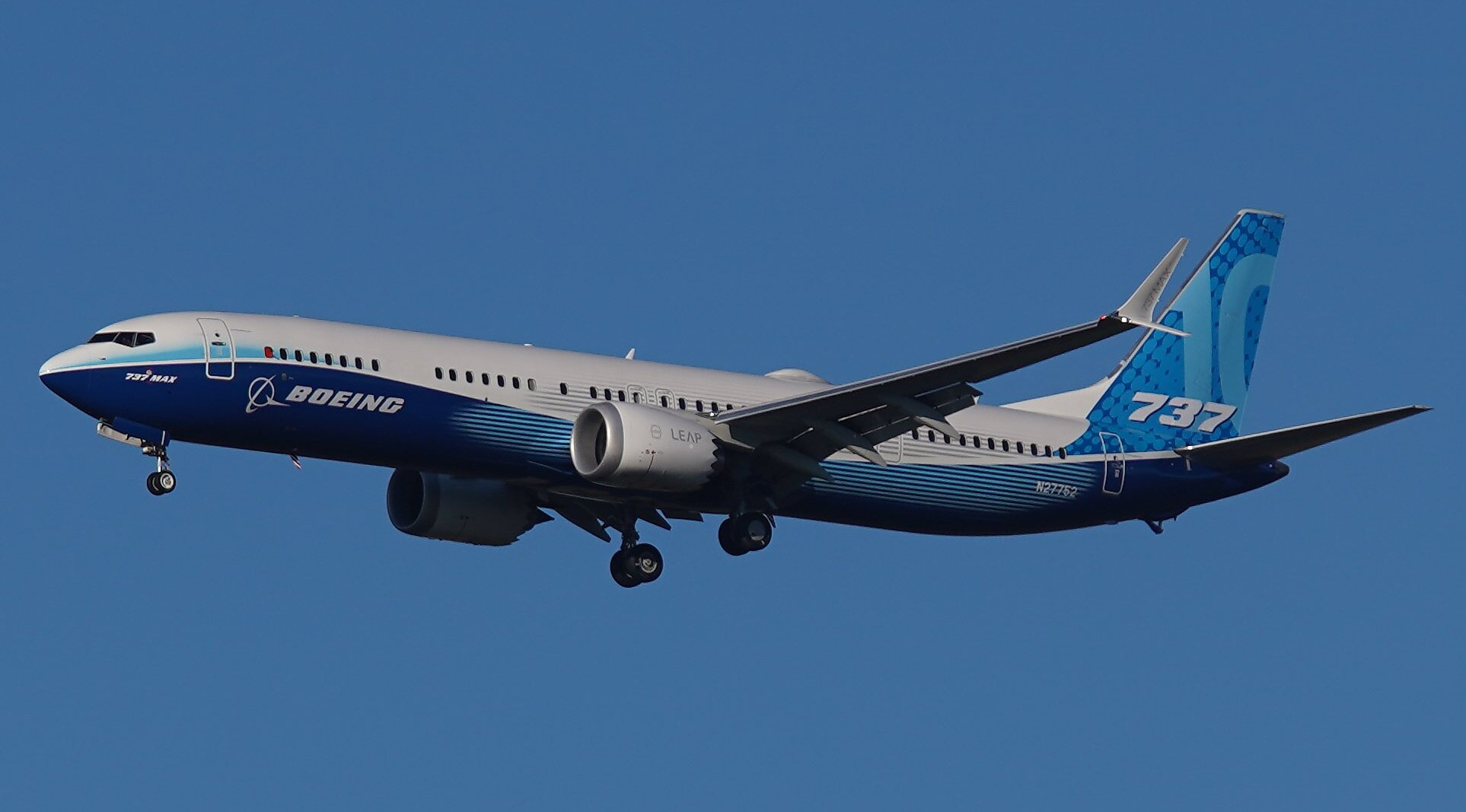
The 737 MAX 10 is the largest and likely the ultimate development of the 737 MAX as well as of the entire 737 family.

After the 737 MAX launch in late 2011, Boeing confirmed to study a replacement for the long haul 757-200 market, potentially as a further derivative of the 737 Max, as the 757-200 production ceased in 2004 and is replaced on medium haul routes by the Airbus A321 or the 737-900ER. In February 2014, as Airbus was going to overtake Boeing leadership for narrowbodies, especially as the A321neo was outselling the 737 MAX 9, Boeing was pressured to launch a 757 successor. In November, Boeing denied working on a modification of the 737 MAX 9. A parallel development of a MoM aircraft along with the new small airplane (NSA) 737 replacement, similar to when the 757 and 767 were developed in the 1970s, was then under consideration. Boeing finalised the 737 MAX 10 stretch design in early 2017.

== Airbus A321LR ==
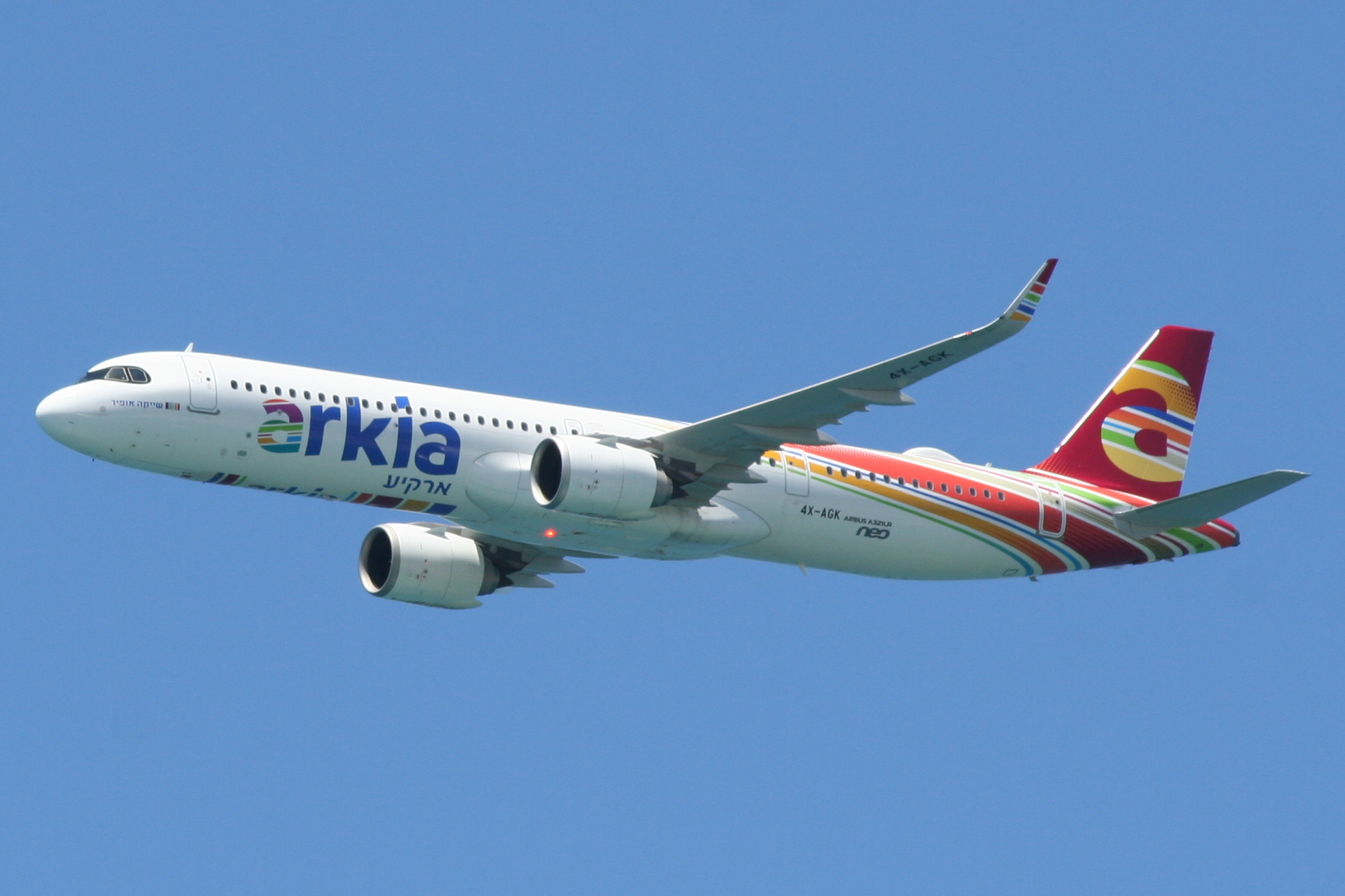
The A321LR, a heavier A321neo, was first delivered to Arkia on 13 November 2018

In October 2014, Airbus started marketing a 164 seats, 97 t (214,000 lb) maximum takeoff weight variant with three auxiliary fuel tanks called the Airbus A321neoLR (Long Range) with 100 nm more operational range than the 169 seats Boeing 757-200W, 27% lower trip costs and 24% lower per seat costs; it would be scheduled for introduction in the second half of 2018, two years after the A321neo.

Airbus launched the A321LR on 13 January 2015 with Air Lease Corporation as the launch customer, hoping to sell 1,000 examples of the variant. The initial layout of 164 seats (20 in business, 30 in premium economy and 114 in economy) is replaced by a 206-seat configuration (16 in business and 190 in economy) and range is 4,000 nmi (7,400 km), 500-nm farther than the regular 93.5t MTOW A321. Boeing dismissed Airbus projections of demand for 1,000 aircraft and considers the niche between the 737 MAX 9 and the 787-8 too small for a direct replacement of the 757 but could launch a clean sheet MoM aircraft. The A321neo is outselling the Boeing 4 to 1. The A321LR is seen as a replacement for the 757 by long-time Boeing customers.

On March 30, 2018, an A321LR test airframe carrying the equivalent of 178 passengers and crew completed a nonstop 4,750-nautical-mile (8,800 km) flight from the Seychelles to Toulouse in 11 hours.

== Boeing 757 re-engining ==
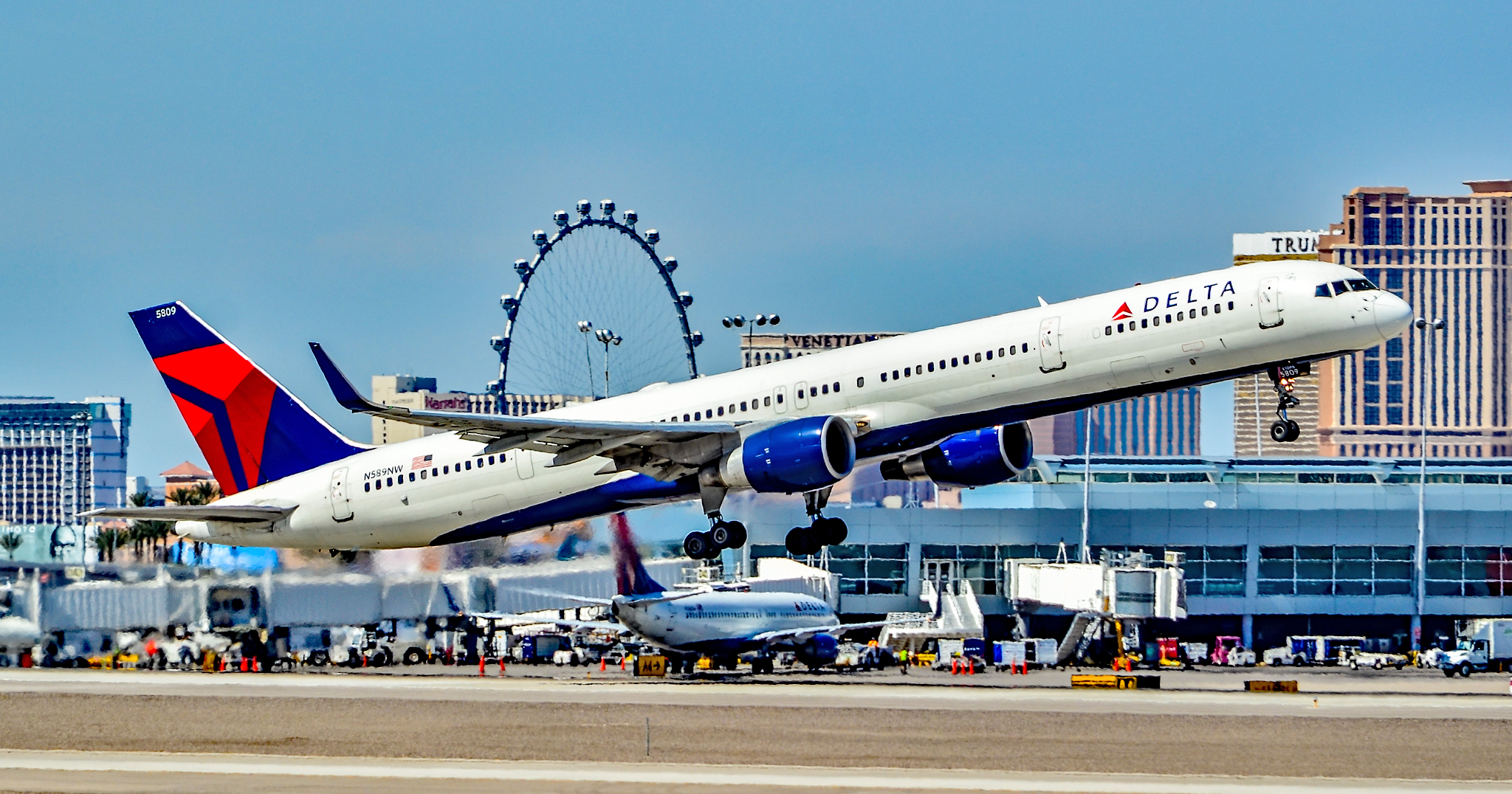
One in 20 Boeing 757s is the -300 stretch

In February 2014, Boeing marketing Vice President Randy Tinseth said the 737-900ER/MAX 9 covers 95% of the routes flown by a 757. In February 2015, he stated that re-engining the 757 had been studied but there was no business case to support it. It was in response to Air Lease Corporation's Steven Udvar-Hazy comments that Boeing could do it, but Jefferies Group analyst Howard Rubel noted that 15 percent of the 757 fleet, 150 aircraft, are parked and unused, and see no urgency to fill that market niche.

Reengining and improving the wings of the existing 757 could be done. While Boeing suggested that the 757 replacement market is very small, operators like La Compagnie disagreed. Delta Air Lines is replacing theirs with Boeing 737-900ERs and A321s.

== New Midsize Airplane ==
Boeing has been studying a New Midsize Airplane since 2015, when it determined that the market was large enough to launch a new design. Multiple airlines expressed interest in a composite, seven-abreast twin-aisle with an elliptical cross-section. It is slated as a 5,000 nmi (9,300 km) range 225 seater and a 4,500 nmi (8,300 km) 275 seater, as market forecasts varies between 2,000 and 4,000. Sold for $65m-$75m, it should generate 30% more revenue than narrowbodies and have 40% lower trip costs than replaced widebodies but would cost $12–15 billion to develop. A new 50,000 lbf (220 kN) turbofan could be proposed by GE Aviation/CFM International, Pratt & Whitney or Rolls-Royce plc with a bypass ratio of 10:1 or more and an overall pressure ratio over 50:1. Boeing had intended to decide in 2019 whether to offer the new aircraft for sale, leading to a launch decision in 2020 and entry into service around 2025.

After the grounding of the 737 MAX, Boeing was reportedly cancelling the NMA indefinitely and scrapping the clean sheet idea to create new versions of the aging 757 and 767, tentatively called the "757-Plus and 767X."

In February 2021, Boeing was reported to be revisiting the NMA to compete with the A321XLR as a 757-200/300 successor. Boeing intended to target production costs comparable to single-aisle aircraft by reutilizing existing structures, systems and engine technology. Development costs were expected to reach $2–3 billion a year, up to $25 billion in total, with a potential go-ahead in 2022 or 2023 leading to a possible late 2020s service entry.

In June 2022, Boeing indicated that it would not pursue development of the NMA for "at least a couple of years", until significant progress has been made on the next generation of engines and until new digital development tools are sufficiently mature.

== Airbus A321 development ==
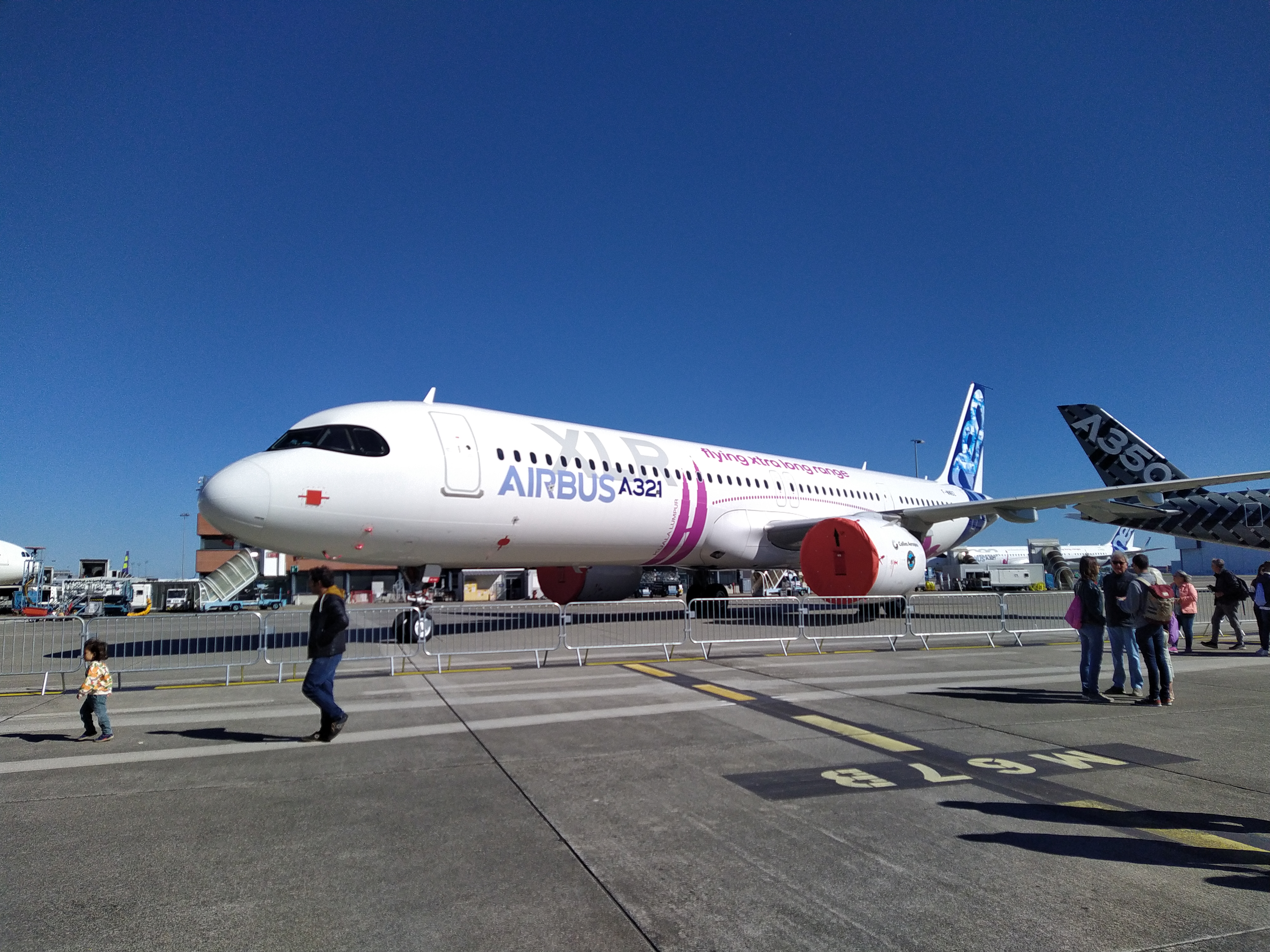
The A321XLR - an ultimate development of the A321neo - is currently the most capable (in terms of both performance and capacity) narrowbody aircraft in production.

As Airbus does not believe small twin-aisle are worthy competitors in this market segment, as exemplified by the A310, it is studying a hypothetical A321neo-plus and A321neo-plus-plus with a new carbon fibre composite wing to counter Boeing for a $1–2 billion development cost against $15 billion for a new jet. Such a plane would have a 105 t (231,000 lb) MTOW. In April 2018, Airbus shelved studies on the A320/A321neo-plus, as they felt that increasing the rate of narrowbody production is problematic.

Airbus developed the A321XLR to predate the Boeing NMA, with the same capacity and aerodynamic design but more fuel load. It could be launched in 2019 for a 2021/2022 introduction and by July 2018, an extra 200-300 nmi range was secured with the help of a larger center fuel tank, lacking 200 nmi to achieve a 4,500 nmi (8,300 km) range. Airbus could offer a stretched A322neo seating 264–270 in two classes with more range than the 757-300, perhaps with a new wing for a $2bn development cost. The first commercial flight of the A321XLR was in 2024 with Iberia.
