= Narrow-body aircraft =

Airliner with a single aisle

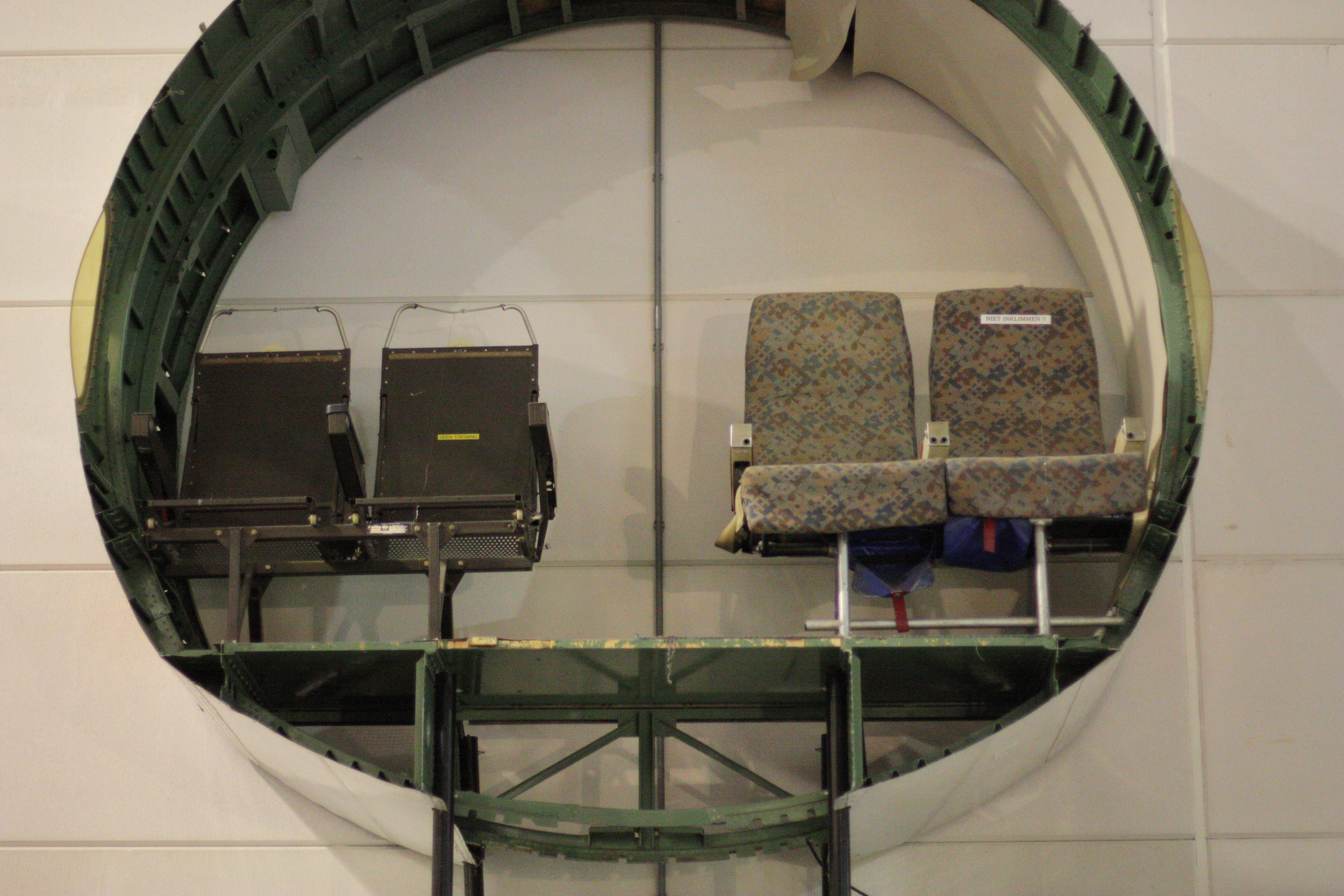
Four-abreast cross-section

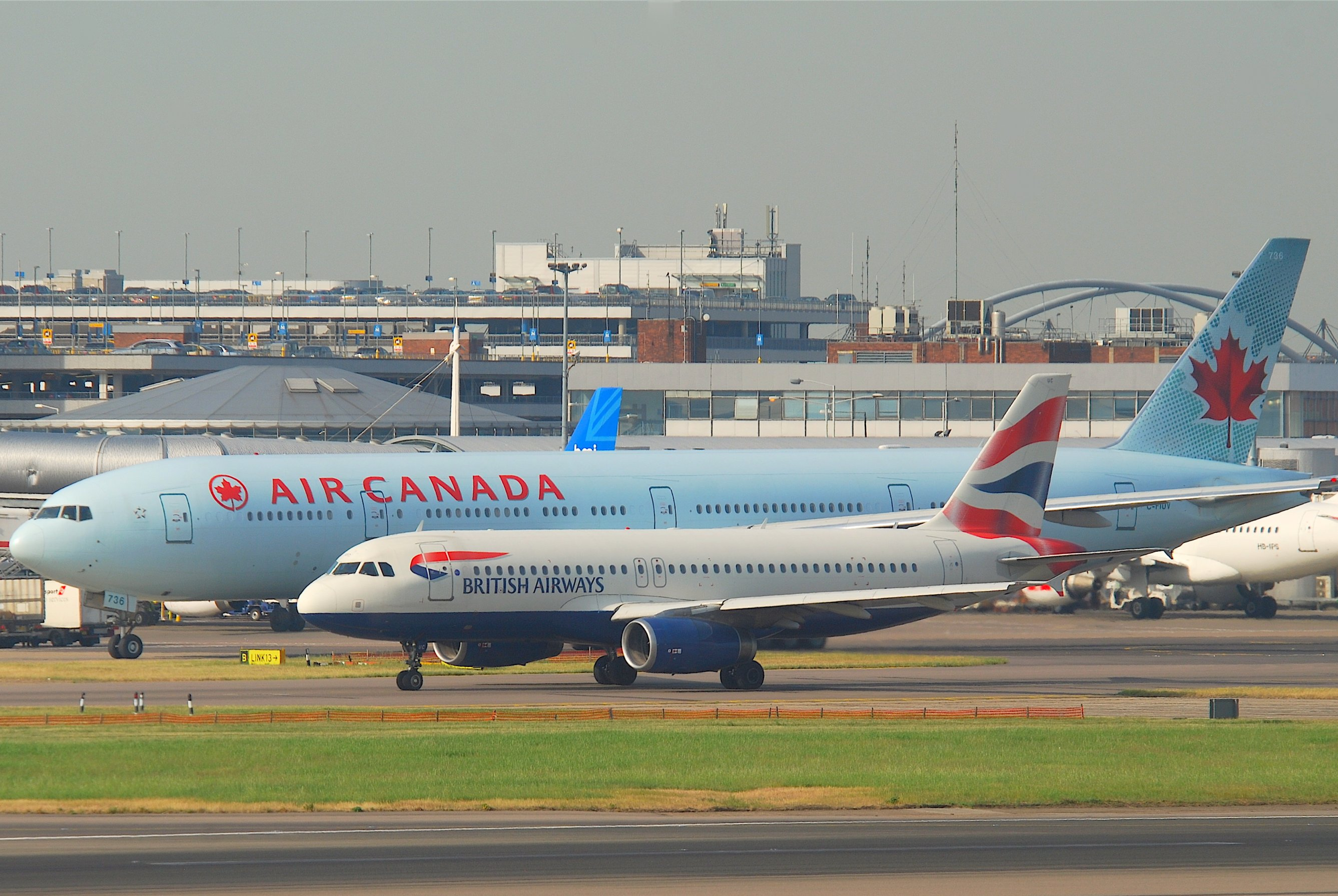
Narrow-body Airbus A320 operated by British Airways in front of a Boeing 777-300ER wide-body operated by Air Canada in June 2010

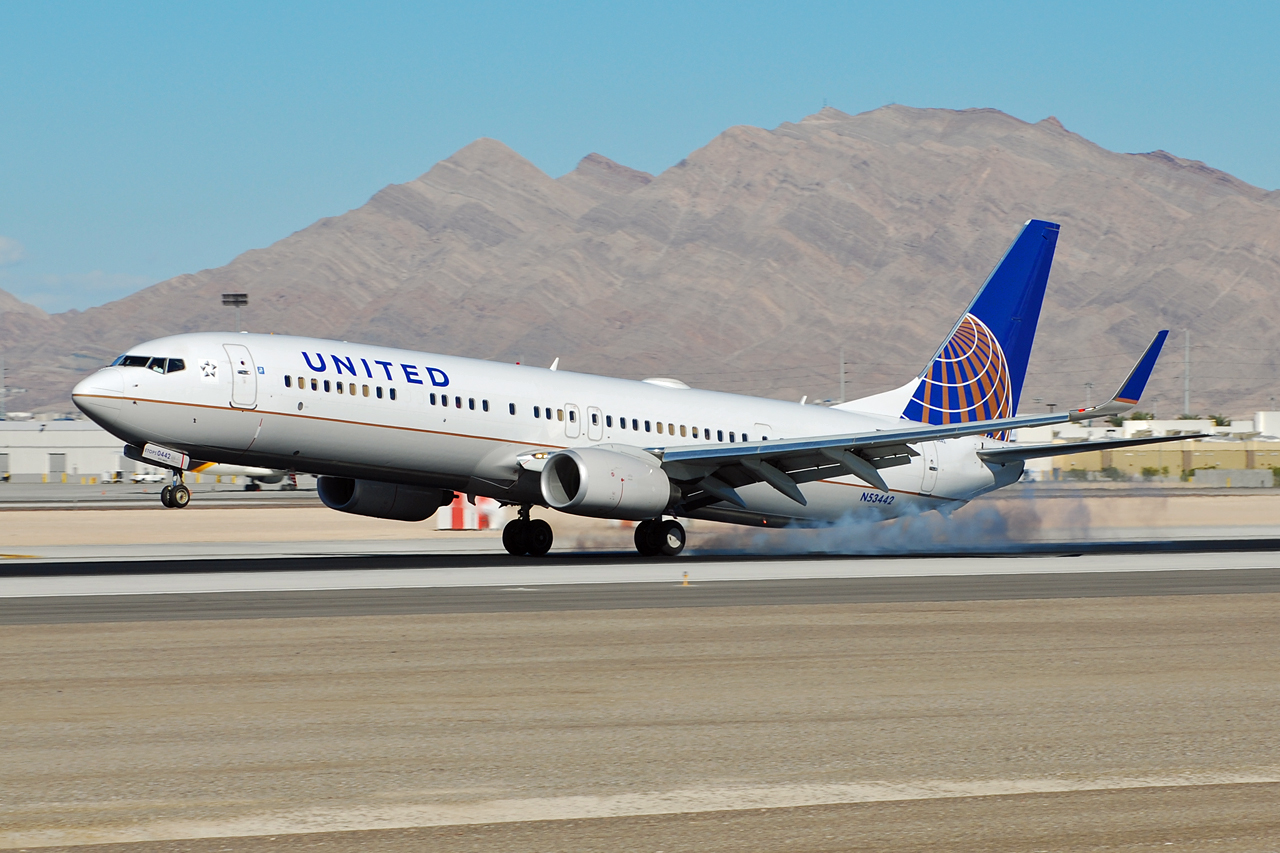
Narrow-body Boeing 737-900 operated by United Airlines in October 2010

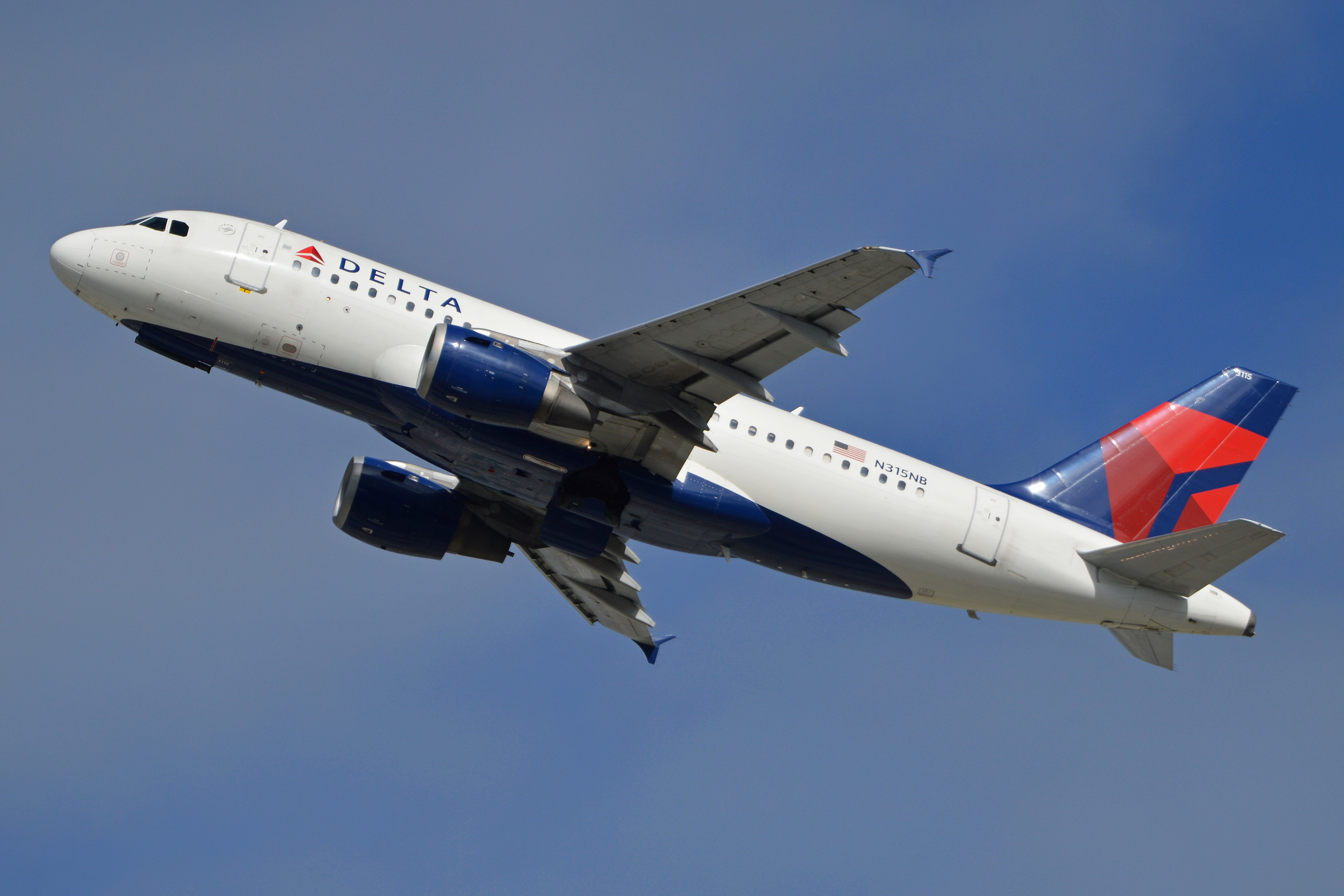
Narrow-body Airbus A319 operated by Delta Air Lines in February 2014

A narrow-body aircraft or single-aisle aircraft is an airliner arranged along a single aisle, permitting up to 6-abreast seating in a cabin less than 4 metres (13 ft) in width. In contrast, a wide-body aircraft is a larger airliner usually configured with multiple aisles and a fuselage diameter of more than 5 metres (16 ft), allowing at least seven-abreast seating and often more travel classes.

== Market ==
From the late 1960s through the 1990s, twin engine narrow-body aircraft, such as the Boeing 737 Classic, McDonnell-Douglas MD-80 and Airbus A320 were employed in short to medium-haul markets which did not require the range or passenger-carrying capacity of wide-body aircraft.

The re-engined Boeing 737 MAX and Airbus A320neo jets offer 500 miles more range, allowing them to operate the 3,000 miles transatlantic flights between the eastern U.S. and Western Europe, previously dominated by wide-body aircraft. Norwegian Air Shuttle, JetBlue and TAP Portugal will open up direct routes bypassing airline hubs for lower fares between cheaper, smaller airports. The Boeing 737NG 3,300-mile range is insufficient for fully laden operations and operates at reduced capacity like the Airbus A318, while the Airbus A321LR could replace the less fuel efficient Boeing 757s used since their production ended in 2004. Boeing will face competition and pricing pressure from the Embraer E-Jet E2 family, Airbus A220 (formerly Bombardier CSeries) and Comac C919.

Between 2016 and 2035, FlightGlobal expects 26,860 single-aisles to be delivered for almost $1380 billion, 45% Airbus A320 family ceo and neo and 43% Boeing 737 NG and max. By June 2018, there were 10,572 Airbus A320neo and Boeing 737 MAX orders: 6,068 Airbuses (57%, 2,295 with CFMs, 1,623 with PWs and 2,150 with not yet decided engines) and 4,504 Boeings (43%); 3,446 in Asia-Pacific (33%), 2,349 in Europe (22%), 1,926 in North America (18%), 912 in Latin America (9%), 654 in Middle East (6%), 72 in Africa (1%) and 1,213 not yet bounded (11%).

Many airlines have shown interest in the Airbus A321LR or its A321XLR derivative, and other extended-range models, for thin transatlantic and Asia-Pacific routes.

== Examples ==
=== Six-abreast cabin ===
Type	Country	Production	Fuselage width	Cabin width	Max. seats	Engines	seat width (Note: with 2" armrests when not otherwise specified)
Hawker Siddeley Trident (Note: except seven-abreast for Channel Airways)	UK	1962–1978		344 cm (135 in)	180	3x turbofan (Note: +1 booster on some variants)	
Sud Aviation SE 210 Caravelle	France	1958-1972			99	2x turbojet	
Bristol Britannia	UK	1952–1960	366 cm (144 in)	350 cm (139 in)	139	4×turboprop	
Douglas DC-8	US	1958–1972	373 cm (147 in)	351.2 cm (138 in)	269	4×turbojet/fan	
Ilyushin Il-62	USSR/Russia	1963–1995	380 cm (150 in)	356 cm (140 in)	186	4×turbofan	
Vickers VC10	UK	1962–1970	375 cm (148 in)	351 cm (138 in)	151	4×turbofan	
Boeing 707/Boeing 720	US	1958–1979	376 cm (148 in)	354 cm (139 in)	219	4×turbojet/fan	17"
Boeing 737	US	1966–present	376 cm (148 in)	354 cm (139 in)	220	2×turbofan	17"
Boeing 757	US	1981–2004	376 cm (148 in)	354 cm (139 in)	295	2×turbofan	17"
Boeing 727	US	1963–1984	376 cm (148 in)	356 cm (140 in)	189	3×turbofan	16.9"
Tupolev Tu-154	USSR/Russia	1968–2013	380 cm (150 in)	356 cm (140 in)	180	3×turbofan	
Tupolev Tu-204	Russia	1990–present (Note: limited production)	380 cm (150 in)	357 cm (141 in)	215	2×turbofan	
Tupolev Tu-334	Russia	1999–2009	380 cm (150 in)	357 cm (141 in)	102	2×turbofan	
Yakovlev Yak-42	USSR/Russia	1977–2003	380 cm (150 in)	360 cm (142 in)	120	3×turbofan	
Dassault Mercure	France	1971–1975		366 cm (144 in)	162	2×turbofan	
Airbus A320 family	Multi	1986–present	395 cm (156 in)	370 cm (146 in)	244	2×turbofan	18"
Comac C919	China	2016–present	396 cm (156 in)	390 cm (154 in)	192	2×turbofan	
Yakovlev MC-21	Russia	2017–present	406 cm (160 in)	381 cm (150 in)	230	2×turbofan	
Tupolev Tu-114 (Note: up to eight-abreast in tourist class)	USSR	1958–1963	420 cm (165 in)	406 cm (160 in)	220	4×turboprop	

=== Five-abreast cabin ===
Type	Country	Production	Fuselage width	Cabin width	Max. seats	Engines	Seat width
de Havilland Comet	UK	1949–1964		292 cm (115 in)	81	4×turbojet	
Douglas DC-4/DC-6/DC-7	US	1942–1958		301 cm (118.5 in)	95	4×piston engine	
Sud Aviation Caravelle	France	1958–1972		301 cm (118.5 in)	80	2×turbojet	
Vickers Viscount	UK	1948–1963		305 cm (120 in)	75	4×turboprop	
Fokker F28/Fokker 70/Fokker 100	Netherlands	1967–1997	330 cm (130 in)	310 cm (122 in)	122	2×turbofan	
Tupolev Tu-144	USSR	1963–1983	330 cm (130 in) (Note: Series Aircraft, 300 cm (118 in) prototype)		140	4×turbojet	
McDonnell Douglas DC-9/MD-80/MD-90/Boeing 717	US	1965–2006	334.3 cm (131.6 in)	311.2 cm (122.5 in)	172	2×turbofan	17.9"
Antonov An-148/An-158	Ukraine	2002–present	335 cm (132 in)	313 cm (123 in)	99	2×turbofan	
Comac C909	China	2007–present	336 cm (132 in)	314.3 cm (123.7 in)	105	2×turbofan	
Boeing 377 Stratocruiser	US	1947–1963	335 cm (132 in)	315 cm (124 in)	114	4×piston engine	
Tupolev Tu-104	USSR	1955–1960	350 cm (137.7 in)	320 cm (126 in)	115	2×turbojet	
Ilyushin Il-18	USSR	1957–1985	351 cm (138 in)	315 cm (124 in)	120	4×turboprop	
BAC One-Eleven	UK	1963–1989		315 cm (124 in)	119	2×turbofan	
Sukhoi Superjet 100	Russia	2007–present	345 cm (136 in)	323.6 cm (127 in)	108	2×turbofan	
Convair 880	US	1959–1962		325 cm (128 in)	110	4×turbojet	
Convair 990	US	1961–1963		325 cm (128 in)	149	4×turbofan	
Lockheed L-188 Electra	US	1957–1961		325 cm (128 in)	98	4×turboprop	
Lockheed Constellation	US	1943–1958		328 cm (129 in)	109	4×piston engine	
Airbus A220	Canada/Multi	2012–present	350 cm (138 in)	328 cm (129 in)	160	2×turbofan	18.6"
British Aerospace 146 (Note: except six-abreast for some operators including CityJet and Mahan Air)	UK	1987–2001	350 cm (138 in)	324 cm (128 in)	112	4×turbofan	

=== Four-abreast cabin ===
Type	Country	Production	Fuselage width	Cabin width	Max. seats	Engines	Seat width
Hawker Siddeley HS 748	United Kingdom	1961–1988			68	2×turboprop	
Yakovlev Yak-40	USSR	1966–1981	240 cm (94 in)	215 cm (85 in)	40	3×turbofan	
Douglas DC-3	US	1936–1942, 1950		250 cm (98 in)	27	2×piston engine	
De Havilland Dash 8	Canada	1983–present	269 cm (106 in)	251 cm (99 in)	90	2×turboprop	17.3"
Fokker 27/Fokker 50	Netherlands	1987–1997		254 cm (100 in)	58	2×turboprop	
Bombardier CRJ	Canada	1991–2020	269 cm (106.1 in)	255 cm (100.5 in)	104	2×turbofan	17.3"
ATR 42/ATR 72	France/Italy	1984–present	273 cm (107 in)	257 cm (101 in)	78	2×turboprop	18"
Concorde	France/UK	1965–1979		262 cm (103 in)	128	4×turbojet	
Convair CV-240	US	1947–1954		271 cm (106.5 in)	40	2×piston engine	
Tupolev Tu-124/Tu-134	USSR	1956–1984	290 cm (114 in)	261 cm (103 in)	56-84	2×turbofan	
Ilyushin Il-114	USSR/Russia	1997–2012	264 cm (104 in)	228 cm (90 in)	64	2×turboprop	
Embraer E-Jet/E-Jet E2	Brazil	2001–present	301 cm (119 in)	274 cm (108 in)	146	2×turbofan	18"
Antonov An-24	USSR	1959–1979		277 cm (109 in)	50	2×turboprop	

=== Three-abreast cabin ===
Type	Country	Production	Fuselage width	Cabin width	Max. seats	Engines	Seat width
Fokker F.VII	Netherlands	1924-1932			8-11	3xpiston engine	
Boeing 80	US	1928-1934			18	3xpiston engine	
de Havilland Canada DHC-3 Otter	Canada	1951-1967			9-11	1xpiston engine or 1xturboprop	
de Havilland Canada DHC-6 Twin Otter	Canada	1965–1988, 2008–present	175 cm (69 in)	161 cm (63.2 in)	19	2×turboprop	
Cessna 208 Caravan	US	1982–present			9-13	1xturboprop	
BAe Jetstream 31/41	UK	1982–1997		185 cm (73 in)	30	2×turboprop	
Short 360	UK	1981–1991		193 cm (76 in)	36	2×turboprop	
Embraer EMB 120	Brazil	1983–2001	228 cm (90 in)	210 cm (83 in)	30	2×turboprop	17.3"
Embraer ERJ 145 family	Brazil	1989–2020	228 cm (90 in)	210 cm (83 in)	50	2×turbofan	17.3"
Saab 340/Saab 2000	Sweden	1983–1999	231 cm (91 in)	216 cm (85 in)	50	2×turboprop	18.1"
Dornier 328	Germany	1991–2000		217.2 cm (85.5 in)	32	2×turboprop	18.1"
Cessna 408 SkyCourier	USA	2023–present		188 cm (74 in)	19	2×turboprop	

=== Two-abreast cabin ===
Type	Country	Production	Fuselage width	Cabin width	Max. seats	Engines
Beechcraft 1900	US	1982–2002		1.37m	19	2×turboprop
Beechcraft Model 18	US	1937–1970			6	2×piston engine
Beechcraft Model 99	US	1968–1986			15	2×piston engine
Boeing 247	US	1933–1937			10	2×piston engine
Britten-Norman Islander	UK	1965–present			9	2×piston engine
Britten-Norman Trislander	UK	1970–1982			16	3×piston engine
de Havilland Dove	UK	1946–1947			8–11	2×piston engine
de Havilland Heron	UK	1950–1963			14–17	4×piston engine
Dornier 228	Germany	1981–1998, 2009–present			19	2×turboprop
Douglas DC-1	US	1933			12	2×piston engine
Douglas DC-2	US	1934–1939			14	2×piston engine
Embraer EMB-110 Bandeirante	Brazil	1968–1990			18	2×turboprop
Evektor EV-55 Outback	Czech Republic	2011–present			9–14	2×turboprop
Fairchild Swearingen Metroliner	US	1968–2001			19	2×turboprop
Ford Trimotor	US	1925–1933			11	3×piston engine
GAF Nomad	Australia	1975–1985			12–16	2×turboprop
GippsAero GA10	Australia	2012-2020			9	1xturboprop
Junkers Ju 52	Germany	1930–1952			17	3×piston engine
Lockheed Model 10 Electra	US	1934–1937			10	2×piston engine
Lockheed Model 14 Super Electra	US	1937–1946			12-14	2×piston engine
Tecnam P2012 Traveller	Italy	2016–Present			11	2×piston engine

== Image gallery ==
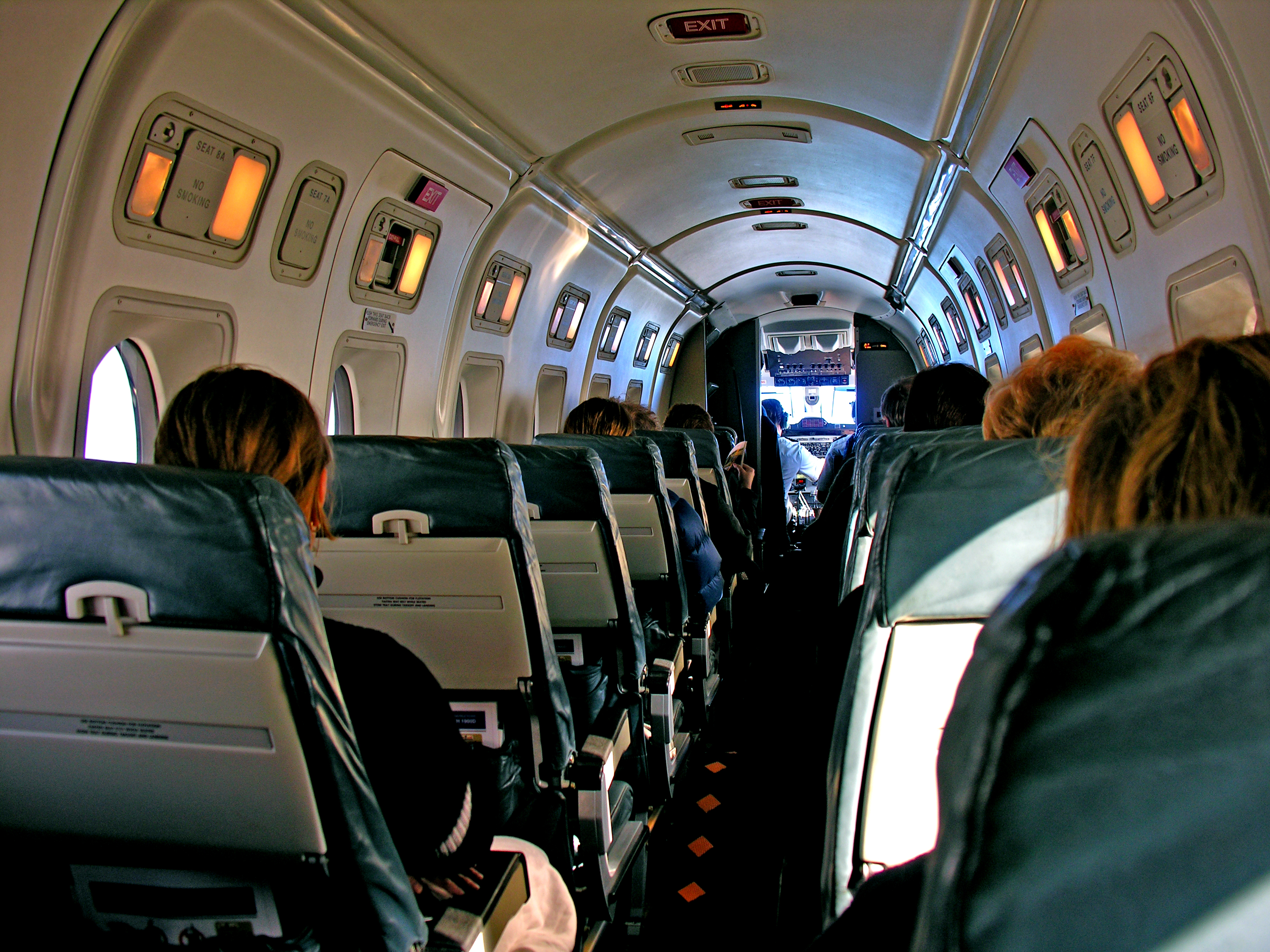
Two-abreast Beech 1900

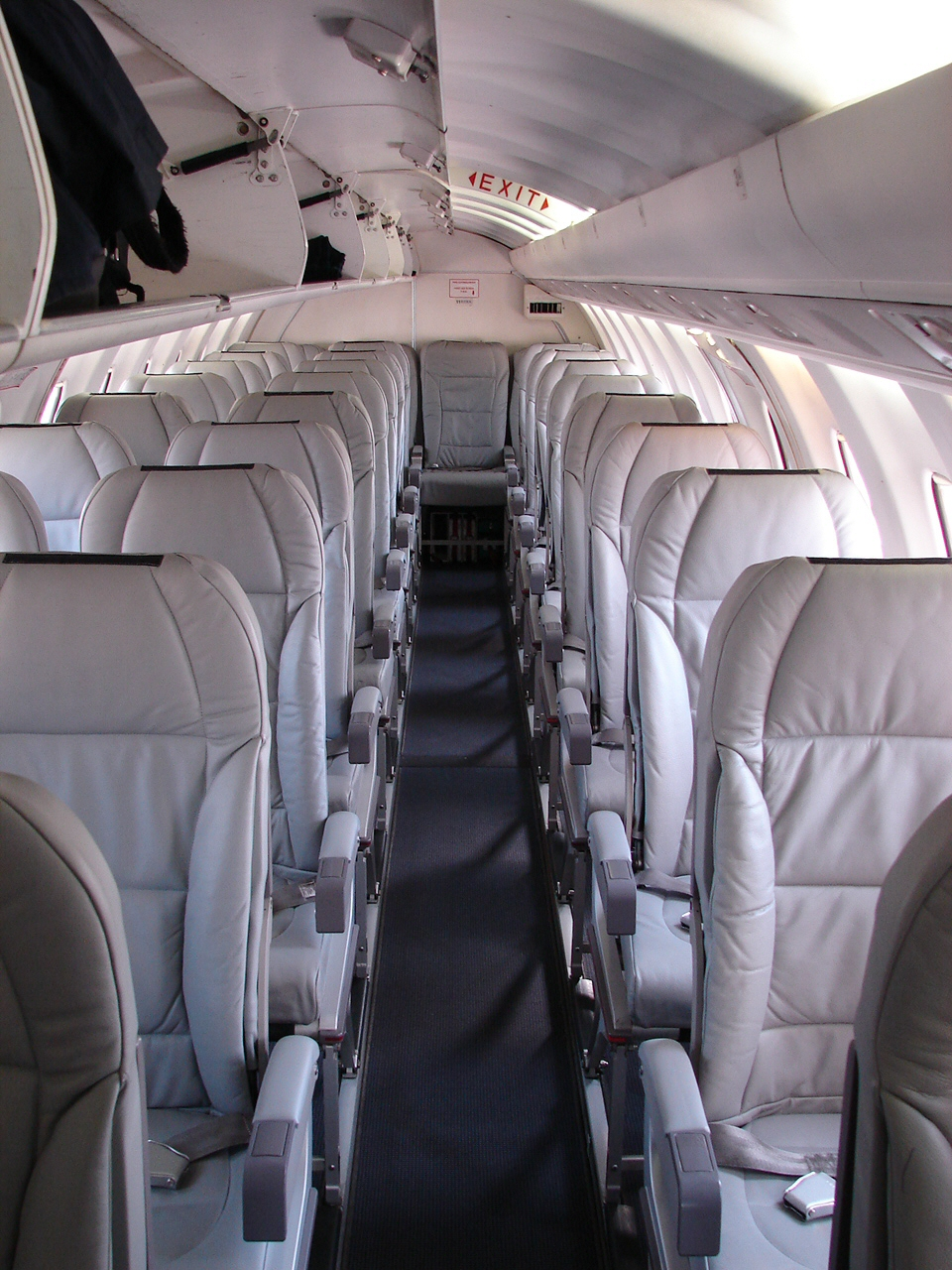
Three-abreast Saab 340

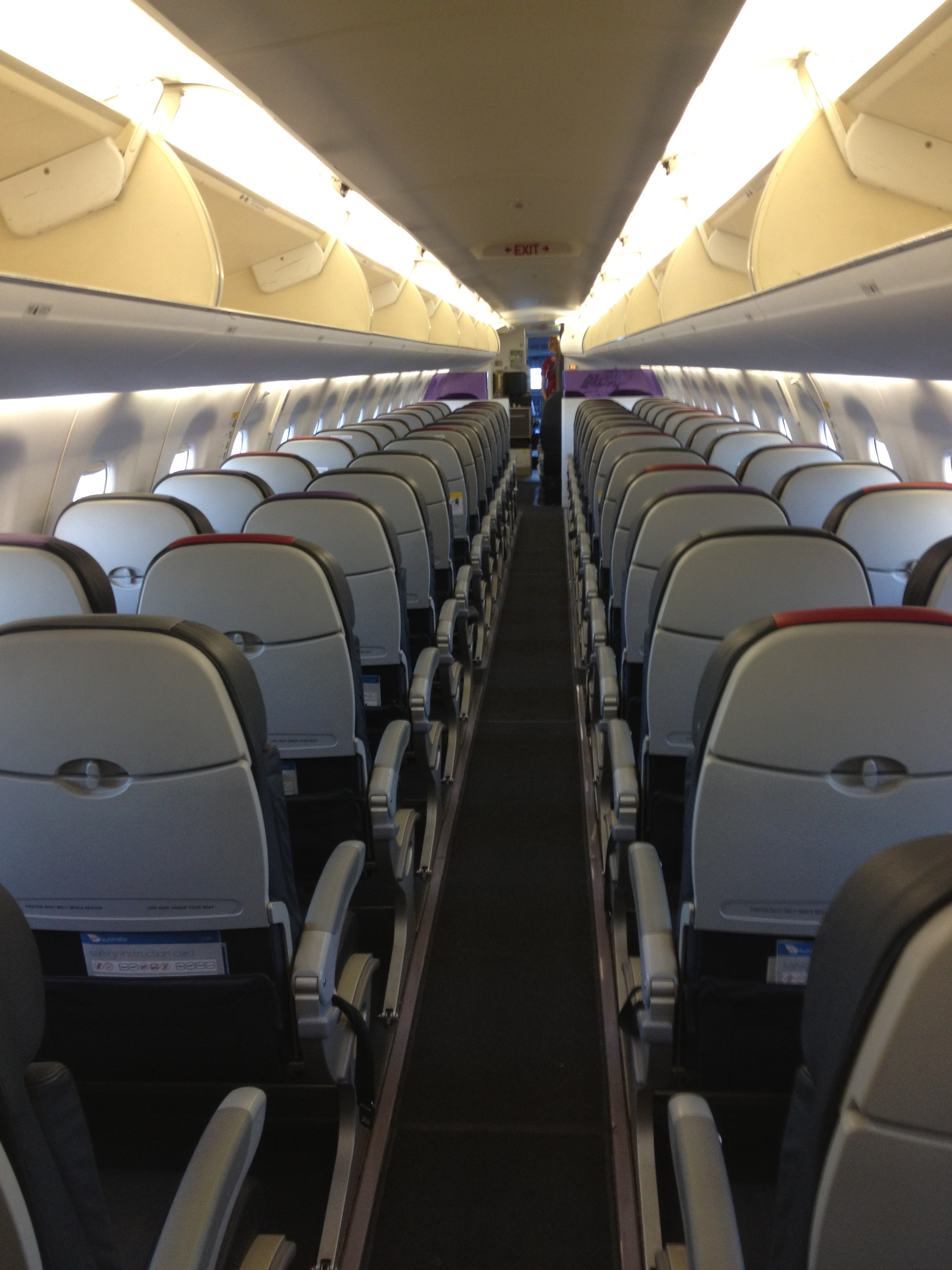
Four-abreast Embraer E190

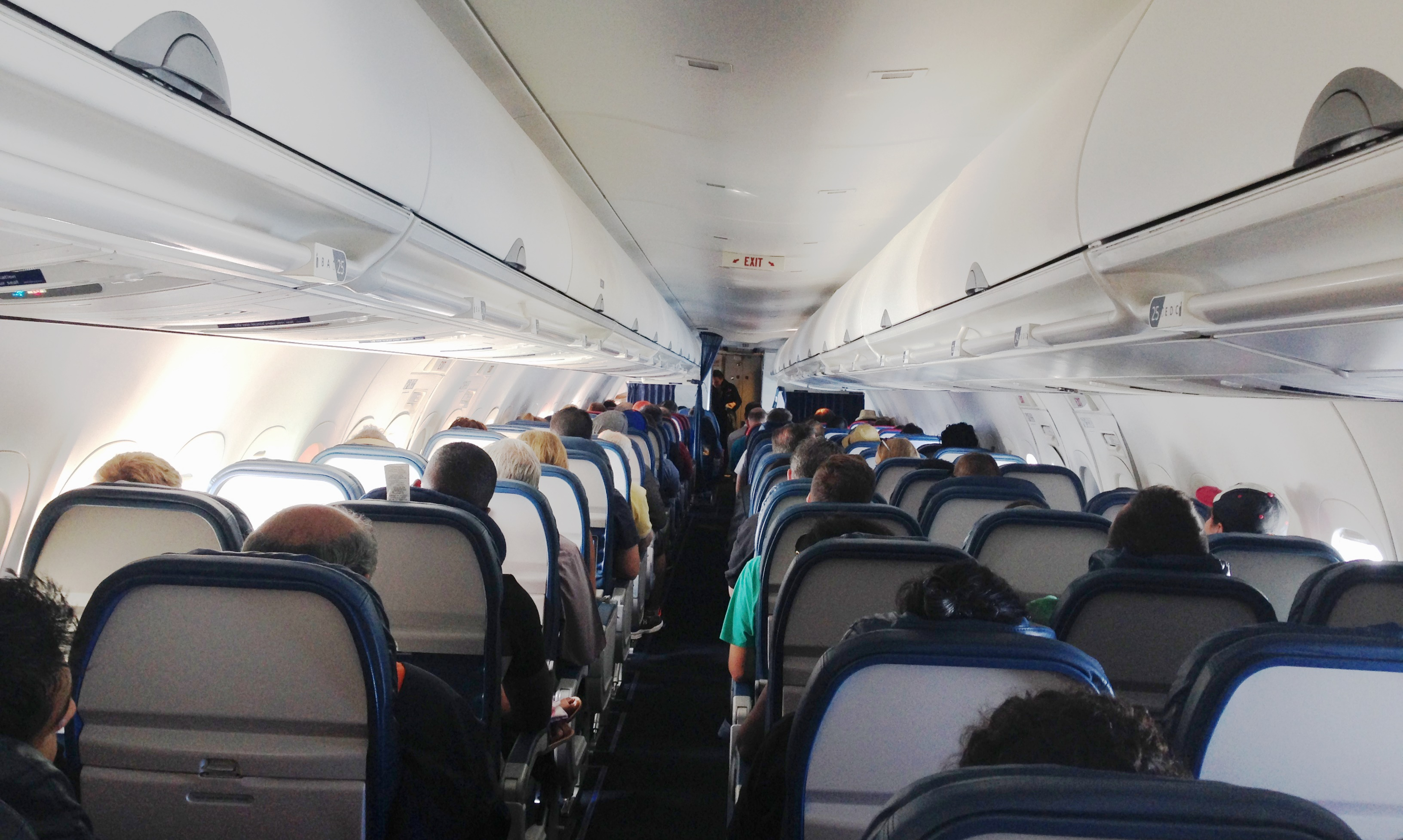
Five-abreast Boeing 717

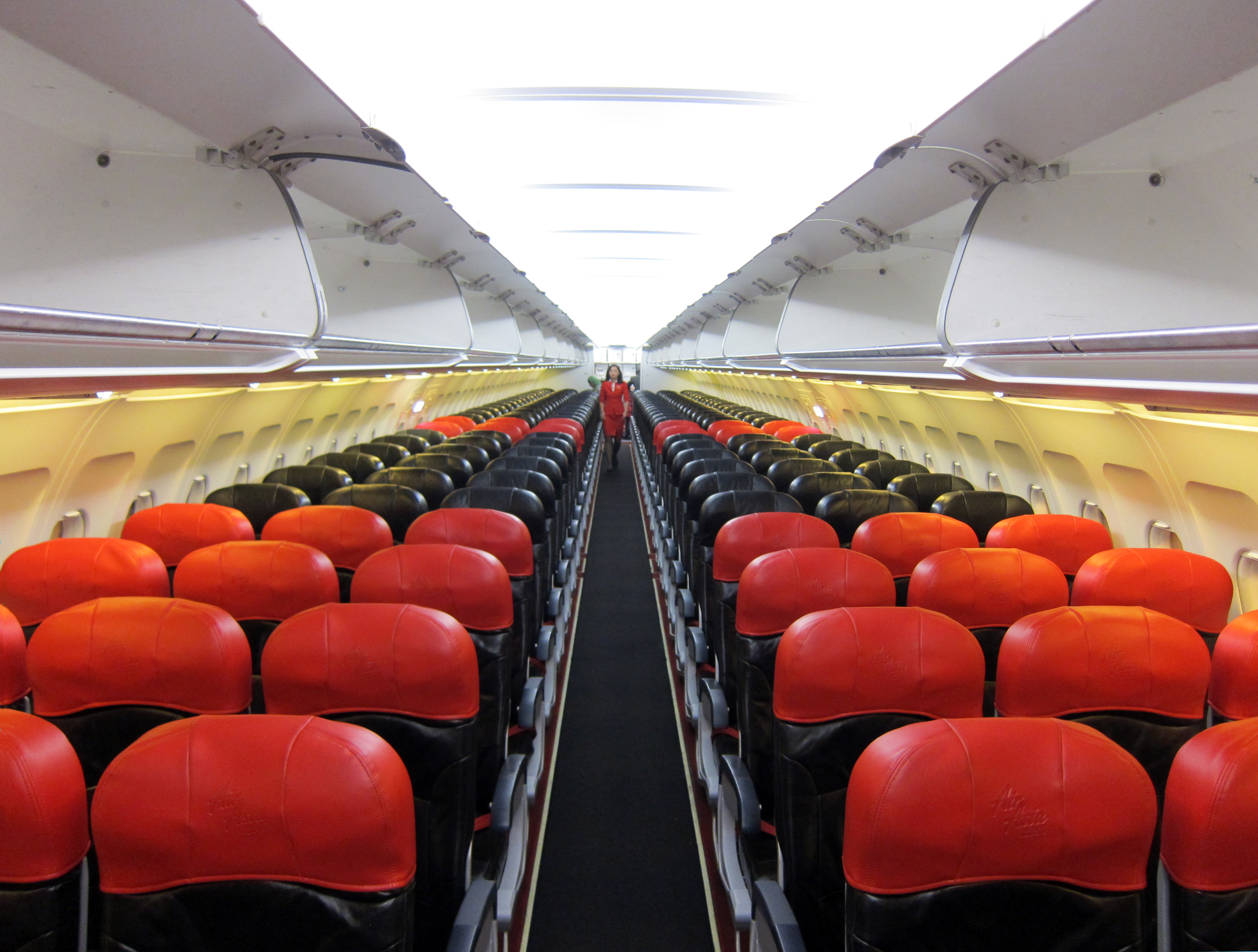
Six-abreast Airbus A320

== See also ==
- List of regional airliners
- Regional jet
- Middle of the market airliners
- Wide-body aircraft
