= Available seat miles =

Measure of passenger carrying capacity

Available seat miles (ASM) or available seat kilometers (ASK) is a measure of passenger carrying capacity in passenger transportation. It is equal to the number of seats available multiplied by the number of miles or kilometers traveled by a vehicle.

In the airline industry an available seat mile is the fundamental unit of financial performance measurement for a passenger-carrying airline. A unit in this case is one seat, available for sale, flown one mile.

== Examples ==
For example, an aircraft with 300 seats available for sale flying 1,000 statute miles would generate 300,000 ASMs for that particular flight. That the seats are available for sale is critical. An aircraft that had 300 seats but which was limited (e.g. for regulatory or technical reasons) to selling only 250 of them on a particular flight of 1,000 miles would generate 250,000 ASMs on that flight, not 300,000. Similarly, if passenger seats on a particular flight are dedicated to crew rest purposes, such seats would not be included in the calculation of ASMs for that flight.

== Related quantities ==
=== Cost per ASM / ASK (CASM / CASK) ===
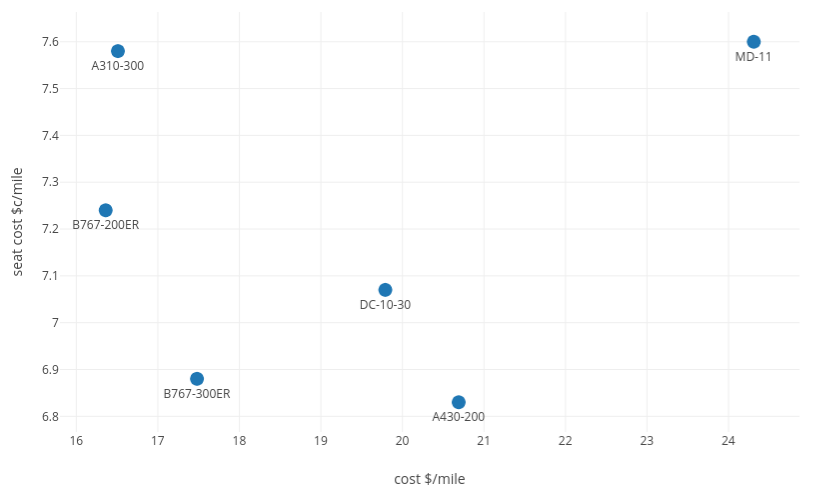
Seat cost and trip cost for widebodies

CASM (or CASK) is a commonly used measure of unit cost in the airline industry. CASM is expressed in cents to operate each seat mile offered, and is determined by dividing operating costs by ASMs. This number is frequently used to allow a cost comparison between different airlines or for the same airline across different time periods (say for one year vs the preceding year). A lower CASM means that it is easier for the airline to make a profit, as they have to charge less to break even. A low CASM, however, is by no means a guarantee of profitability. Further, CASM should only be compared across airlines with care. For instance, all other things being equal, an airline with a longer average stage length will have a lower CASM, because fixed costs will account for a lower portion of its total costs. For this reason, to be meaningful, CASM comparisons across different airlines generally require, at a minimum, that CASMs for all airlines be adjusted to a common stage length, or that the CASMs be graphed versus the stage length of all the airlines being compared.

CASM is generally calculated for a particular airline (or portion of an airline—for instance, an airline's Pacific operations as opposed to the entire airline) for a particular period of time—a year, a quarter, a month and so forth. It can also be calculated for a particular route of an airline. However, when it is calculated for anything other than the entire operation of an airline, the relevant costs will inevitably involve cost allocations that require judgments. For instance, the salary of the airline's senior management needs to be spread across the different parts of the airline and can be divvied up across its routes according to many different methodologies—by the number of flights on that route during that time period, by the number of flight hours on that route, etc. There is not necessarily any right method for making such cost allocations, but it is important when making comparisons across airlines that if an allocation methodology is relevant (i.e. less than the entire of each airline is being compared) then the same allocation methodology is used with each airline being compared.

For a simple example of the calculation of CASM, in the second quarter of 2011, Southwest Airlines (including its AirTran Airways subsidiary) had operating costs of $3.929 bn and 31.457 bn ASMs, as reflected in Southwest's SEC Form 10-Q for that period. Southwest's system CASM for the second quarter of 2011 was then:

CASM = Direct Operating Cost / Available Seat Mile = $3.929 billion / 31.457 billion = 12.49 cents

=== Ex-fuel CASM or CASM ex-fuel ===
CASM excluding fuel is a commonly used measure to compare the cost performance of airlines excepting the cost of fuel. Due to the volatility of oil prices, airline fuel cost is generally not viewed as controllable (other than in the short-term via fuel hedging). Therefore, management's success at controlling costs is often judged by looking at how the airline's ex-fuel CASM changes from one period to another. For instance, in the second quarter of 2011 Southwest Airlines had fuel costs of $1.527 billion (again, including its AirTran subsidiary). Southwest's system CASM ex-fuel for the second quarter of 2011 was then:

CASM ex-fuel = (Direct Operating Cost - Fuel Cost) / Available Seat Mile = ($3.929 billion - $1.527 billion) / 31.457 billion = 7.63 cents

Again, care must be taken in comparing CASM ex-fuel across periods. In particular, if average stage length for the airline has changed significantly, this could have a significant impact on CASM ex-fuel.

Southwest Airlines’ first quarter of 2018 CASM excluding fuel and special charges was 8.65 cents, roughly equivalent to JetBlue Airways and more than 20% lower than American Airlines, United Airlines and Delta Air Lines, while ULCCs are lower like Spirit Airlines at 5.83 cents while Frontier Airlines' is undisclosed.

=== Revenue per ASM (RASM) ===
RASM is a commonly used measure of unit revenue for airlines, expressed in cents received for each available seat mile and determined by dividing various measures of operating revenue by Available Seat Miles. This number is frequently used to allow a comparison between different airlines or a comparison of the same airline across periods. In theory, the higher the RASM the more profitable the airline should be, assuming that the CASM remains constant. Various measures of revenue may be used. Passenger RASM (or PRASM) is passenger (or scheduled ticket) revenue per ASM. Operating RASM or Total RASM is the airline's total operating revenue per ASM.

So, for instance, in the second quarter of 2011, Southwest had scheduled revenue of $3.876 bn and total operating revenue of $4.136 bn. Southwest's system Passenger RASM and Operating RASM for the second quarter of 2011 were therefore:

Passenger RASM = $3.876 billion / 31.457 billion = 12.32 cents

Operating RASM = $4.136 billion / 31.457 billion = 13.15 cents

Again, RASM comparisons across periods or across airlines also need to be made with care. All else being equal, revenue generally increases with average stage length. However, revenue generally does not increase as quickly as stage length, meaning that RASM typically decreases as average stage length increases.

At constant prices, world airlines RASK fell by 51% from US¢17.5 in 1960 to 8.6 cents in 2015, while CASK went 54% down from 17.5 to 8.1. For the world airline industry between 2003 and 2017, CASK excluding fuel was around US¢6, fuel CASK was between US¢1 and US¢3.5, and RASK was between US¢7 and US¢10.

== See also ==
- Air travel
