= Boeing Yellowstone Project =

Boeing advanced technology project

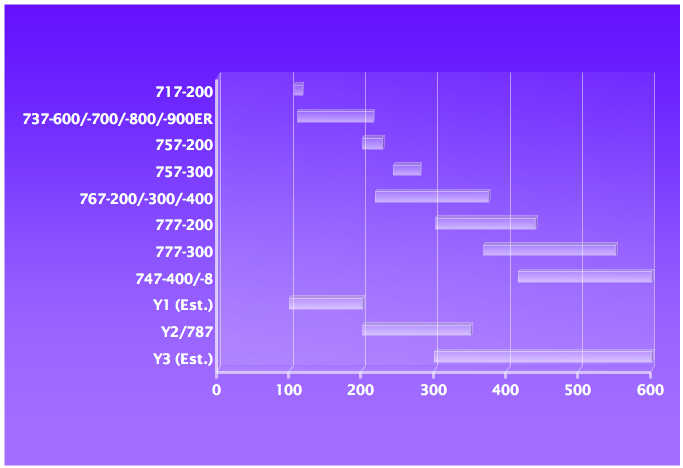
A graph showing the passenger capacity of Boeing's existing civil aircraft compared to Yellowstone.

The Boeing Yellowstone Project was a Boeing Commercial Airplanes project to replace its entire civil aircraft portfolio with advanced technology aircraft. New technologies to be introduced include composite aerostructures, more electrical systems (instead of hydraulic systems), and more fuel-efficient turbofan engines (such as the Pratt & Whitney PW1000G, General Electric GEnx, the CFM International CFM56, and the Rolls-Royce Trent 1000). The term "Yellowstone" refers to the technologies, while "Y1" through "Y3" refer to the actual aircraft.

The first of these projects, Y2, entered service as the Boeing 787. The second project, Y3, is expected to enter service as the Boeing 777X. The Y1 project was cancelled in favor of the re-engined Boeing 737 MAX.

== Yellowstone projects ==
Yellowstone was divided into three projects:

- Boeing Y1, to replace the 737 and 757 product lines. The Y1 would have covered the 100- to 250-passenger market. Boeing submitted a patent application in November 2009, that was released to the public in August 2010, that envisioned an elliptical composite fuselage. In early 2011, Boeing outlined plans for a 737 replacement that would arrive in 2020. However in August 2011, Boeing announced an updated and re-engined version of the 737, the 737 MAX. Y1 concepts were not progressed.
- Boeing Y2, to replace the 767 product line. It covers the 250- to 350-passenger market, and was the first completed Yellowstone project, coming to fruition as the Boeing 787 Dreamliner. Y2 initially referred to the highly efficient, more conventional, baseline aircraft for the Sonic Cruiser, which was project "Glacier". The Dreamliner competes with the Airbus A330neo.
- Boeing Y3, to replace the 777 and 747 product lines. Y3 covers the 350–600+ passenger market. The Boeing 777X is largely considered the end result of the Y3 program, which was launched by Boeing on November 16, 2013. The 777X competes with the Airbus A350.

== See also ==
- Boeing 7X7 series
