= Boeing Commercial Airplanes =

Division of the Boeing Company that builds commercial jet airplanes

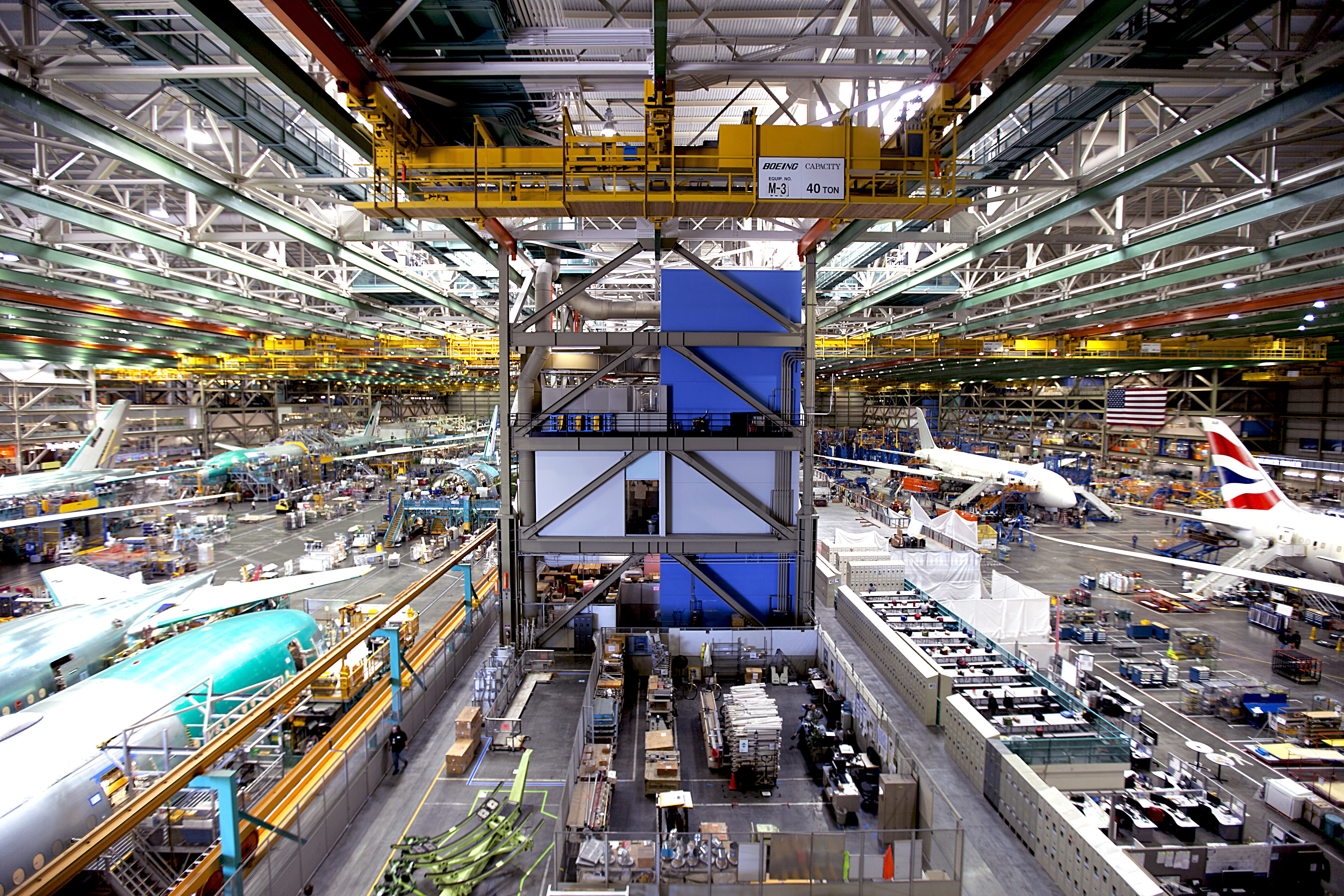
- Interior of the Boeing Everett Factory in Everett, Washington, 2013
- Type: Division
- Industry: Aviation
- Founded: July 15, 1916; 110 years ago
- Founder: William E. Boeing
- Headquarters: Renton, Washington, U.S.
- Area served: Worldwide
- Key people: Stephanie Pope (president and CEO)
- Products: 737, 767, 777, 787
- Production output: ▲600 aircraft (2025)
- Revenue: ▲US$41.5 billion (2025)
- Operating income: ▲US$(7.1) billion (2025)
- Total assets: ▲US$84.2 billion (2024)
- Number of employees: ▲50,640 (2024)
- Parent: The Boeing Company
- Subsidiaries: Boeing Capital
- Website: www.boeing.com/company/about-bca
- Footnotes; Financials as of December 31, 2024; References

Boeing Commercial Airplanes (BCA) is a division of the Boeing Company and designs, assembles, markets, and sells commercial aircraft, including the 737, 767, 777, and 787, along with freighter and business jet variants of most. The division employs nearly 35,000 people, many working at the company's division headquarters in Renton, Washington, or at more than a dozen engineering, manufacturing, and assembly facilities, notably the Everett Factory and Renton Factory (both outside of Seattle), and the South Carolina Factory.

It includes the assets of the Douglas Aircraft division of the former McDonnell Douglas Corporation, which merged with Boeing in 1997. As of the end of 2021, BCA employed about 35,926 people.

== Organization ==
Boeing Commercial Airplanes (BCA) is organized as:

- Airplane Programs
  - Boeing Renton Factory – 737
  - Boeing Everett Factory – 767 and 777
  - Boeing South Carolina – 787
  - Fabrication Division
  - Global Partners
  - Propulsion Systems
- Commercial Aviation Services

BCA subsidiaries:

- Aeroinfo Systems
- Aviall
- Aviation Partners Boeing, a 50/50 joint venture with Aviation Partners Inc.
- Boeing Canada
- Boeing Capital
- Boeing Training & Flight Services (was Alteon Training)
- CDG
- Preston Aviation Solutions

== Management ==
In November 2016, Boeing announced that Ray Conner would step down immediately as BCA's president and CEO. He was succeeded by Kevin G. McAllister, who was the first outside recruitment in BCA history. McAllister was instructed by Dennis Muilenburg to triple revenue from aftermarket services from $15 billion to a target of $50 billion over 10 years, with a new purpose-built unit headed by Stan Deal. Keith Leverkuhn was the vice president and general manager of the 737 MAX program in March 2017 when it received certification.

McAllister was eventually ousted by Boeing in October 2019, in the midst of a company crisis following two fatal crashes of its 737 MAX jets. Stan Deal succeeded him in both of his positions. One insider called McAllister a "scapegoat" as he had only joined BCA during the later stages of the 737 MAX's development. In March 2024, Deal was in turn replaced by Stephanie Pope, formerly head of the Boeing Global Services division.

In December 2024, Boeing announced that it would be laying off over 500 workers in California due to over $6 billion in losses during the third quarter of 2024 caused by worker strikes and other delays.

== Products ==
=== Model naming convention ===
For all models sold beginning with the Boeing 707 in 1957, except the Boeing 720, Boeing's naming system for commercial airliners has taken the form of 7X7 (X representing a number). All model designations from 707 through 787 have been assigned, leaving 797 as the only 7X7 model name not assigned to a product.

For models 707 to 777, the full model number consists of an airplane's model number, for example, 707 or 747, followed by a hyphen and three digits that represent the series within the model, for example, 707-320 or 747-400. In aviation circles, a more specific model designation is sometimes used where the last two digits of the series designator are replaced by the two-digit, alpha-numeric Boeing customer code, for example, 747-121, representing a 747-100 originally ordered by Pan American World Airways (Boeing customer code 21) or 737-7H4, representing a 737-700 originally ordered by Southwest Airlines (Boeing customer code H4). Codes do not change for aircraft transferred from one airline to another. Unlike other models, the 787 uses a single digit to designate the series, for example, 787-8. This convention was followed in the development of the newest version of the 747, the 747-8, along with the 737 MAX and 777X series.

Additional letters are sometimes appended to the model name as a suffix, including "ER" to designate an "extended range" version, such as the 777-300ER, or "LR" to designate a "long range" version, for example 777-200LR. Other suffix designators include "F" for "freighter" (747-400F), "C" for "convertible" aircraft that can be converted between a passenger, combi, and freighter configuration (727-100C), "SR" or "D" for "short range" and "domestic" (747-400D, 747SR), and "M" for "combi" aircraft that are configured to carry both passengers and freight at the same time (757-200M, 747-400M). Passenger aircraft that are originally manufactured as passenger aircraft and later converted to freighter configuration by Boeing carry the suffix "BCF" designating a Boeing converted freighter (747-400BCF). Aircraft that are not converted by Boeing instead carry the suffix "SF" for "Special Freighter"(777-300ERSF)

=== Aircraft in production or development ===
Product list and details
Aircraft model	Number built (Note: As of September 2025)	Description	Capacity	First flight	Variants in production	Out-of-production variants
737	12,255	Twin‑engine, single aisle, short- to medium-range narrow-body	85–230	April 9, 1967	737 MAX 7, MAX 8, MAX 8-200, MAX 9, MAX 10, BBJ, 737 AEW&C, P-8	100, 200, 200C/Adv, 300, 400, 500, 600, 700, 700ER, 800, 900, 900ER, C-40
767	1,341	Heavy, twin-engine, twin aisle, medium- to long-range widebody	180–375	September 26, 1981	300F, KC-767, KC-46, E-767	200, 200ER, 300, 300ER, 400ER
777	1,770	Heavy, twin-engine, twin aisle, medium- to long-range, ultra long-range (200LR), widebody	301–550	June 12, 1994	BBJ, Freighter	200, 200ER, 200LR, 300, 300ER
787	1,222	Heavy, twin-engine, twin aisle, long-range widebody	210–330	December 15, 2009	8, 9, 10, BBJ	

Future airliner models
Expected EIS	Type	Description	Notes
2027	737 MAX 7	Successor of the 737-700 with new engines	Revealed 08/2011
2027	737 MAX 10	Fourth generation of the 737. Lengthened 737 MAX 9. Direct competitor of the Airbus A321neo	Revealed 06/2017
2027	777X	New 777 series, with the lengthened 777-9X, extra-long-range 777-8X, and a freighter 777-8FX. New engine and new composite wings with folding wingtips	Revealed 03/2019

=== Orders and deliveries ===
The table below lists only airliners from the jet era.

Aircraft	Orders	Deliveries	Unfilled
707	865	865	—
717-200	155	155	—
720	154	154	—
727	1,832	1,832	—
737 Original	1,114	1,114	—
737 Classic	1,988	1,988	—
737 NG	7,126	7,118	8
737 MAX	6,813	2,005	4,808
747	1,424	1,424	—
747-8	155	155	—
757	1,050	1,050	—
767	1,430	1,341	89
777	1,831	1,770	61
777X	565	—	565
787	2,270	1,222	1,048
Totals	28,772	22,193	6,579

Data from Boeing through September 2025

=== Discontinued aircraft ===
Aircraft model	Number built	Notes
1	2	
6	1	
6D	2	
7	1	
8	1	
40	84	
64	1	
80	16	
81	2	
95	25	
200 Monomail	1	Converted into the 8-passenger Model 221A
203	7	
204	7	
221 Monomail	1	Converted into the 8-passenger Model 221A
247	75	
307 Stratoliner	10	
314 Clipper	12	
367-80	1	
377 Stratocruiser	56	Civil development of the military C-97
707	856	
720	154	Modified, short range variant of the 707
717	156	Originally developed by McDonnell Douglas as the MD-95: an evolution of the DC-9 family.
727	1,832	Three-engine narrow-body jet
Boeing 737 Original	1,174	Twin engine narrow-body jet
Boeing 737 Classic	1,988	Twin engine narrow-body jet
747	1,574	Heavy, four‑engine, partial double deck, twin–aisle main deck, single–aisle upper deck, medium- to long-range widebody
757	1,050	Narrow-body twin-engine jet

=== Gallery ===
Boeing 7x7 series

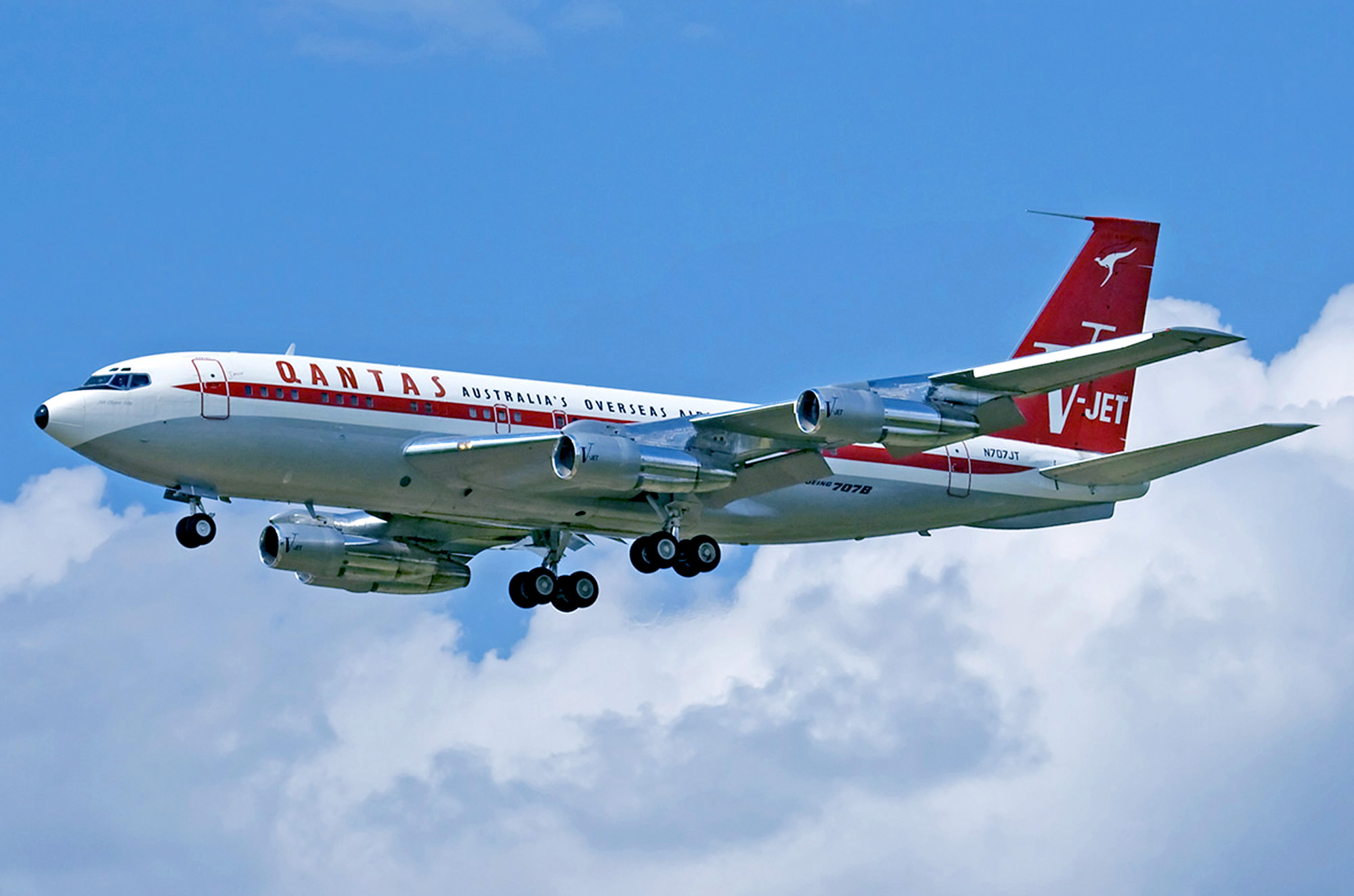
Boeing 707

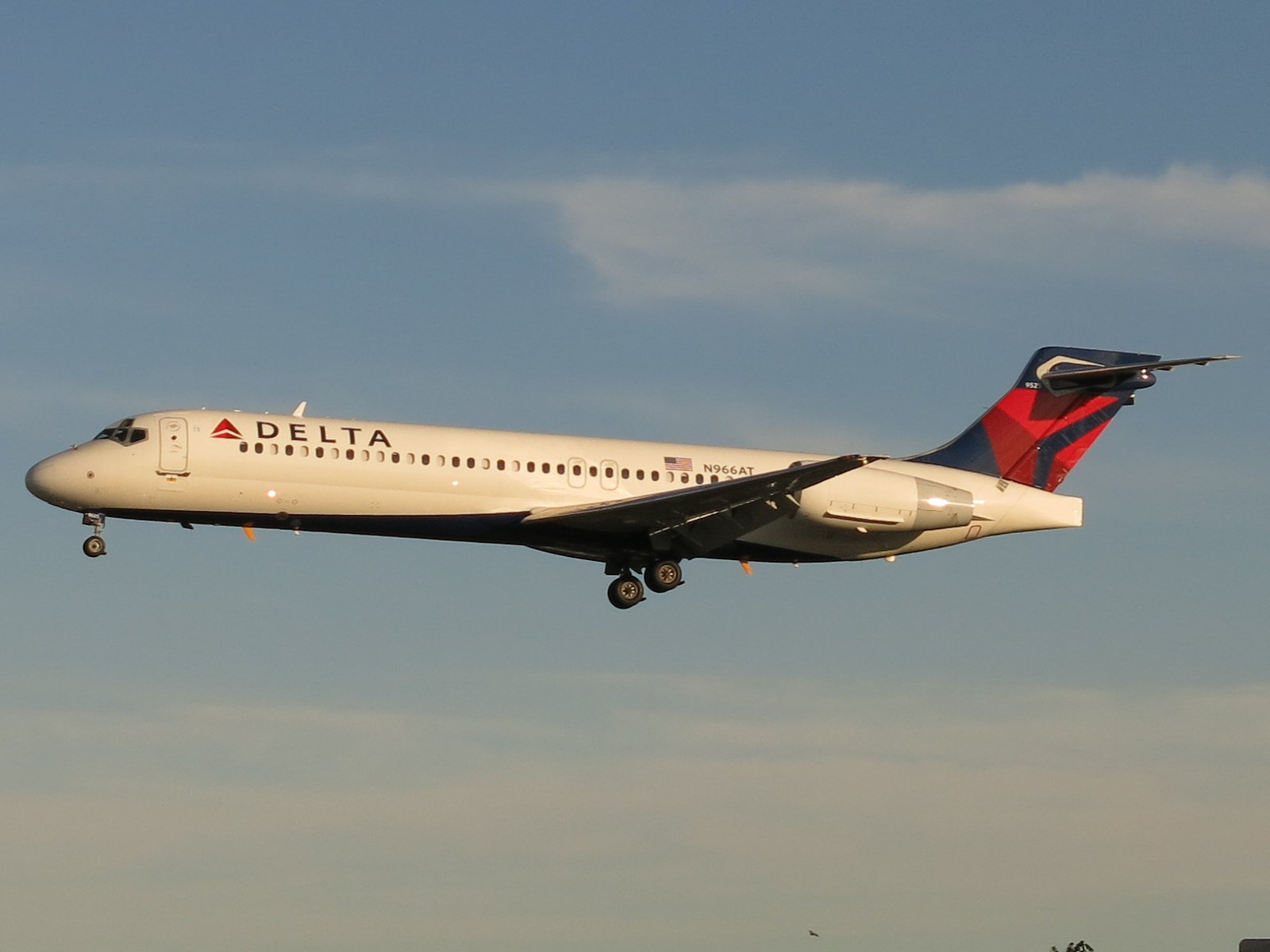
Boeing 717

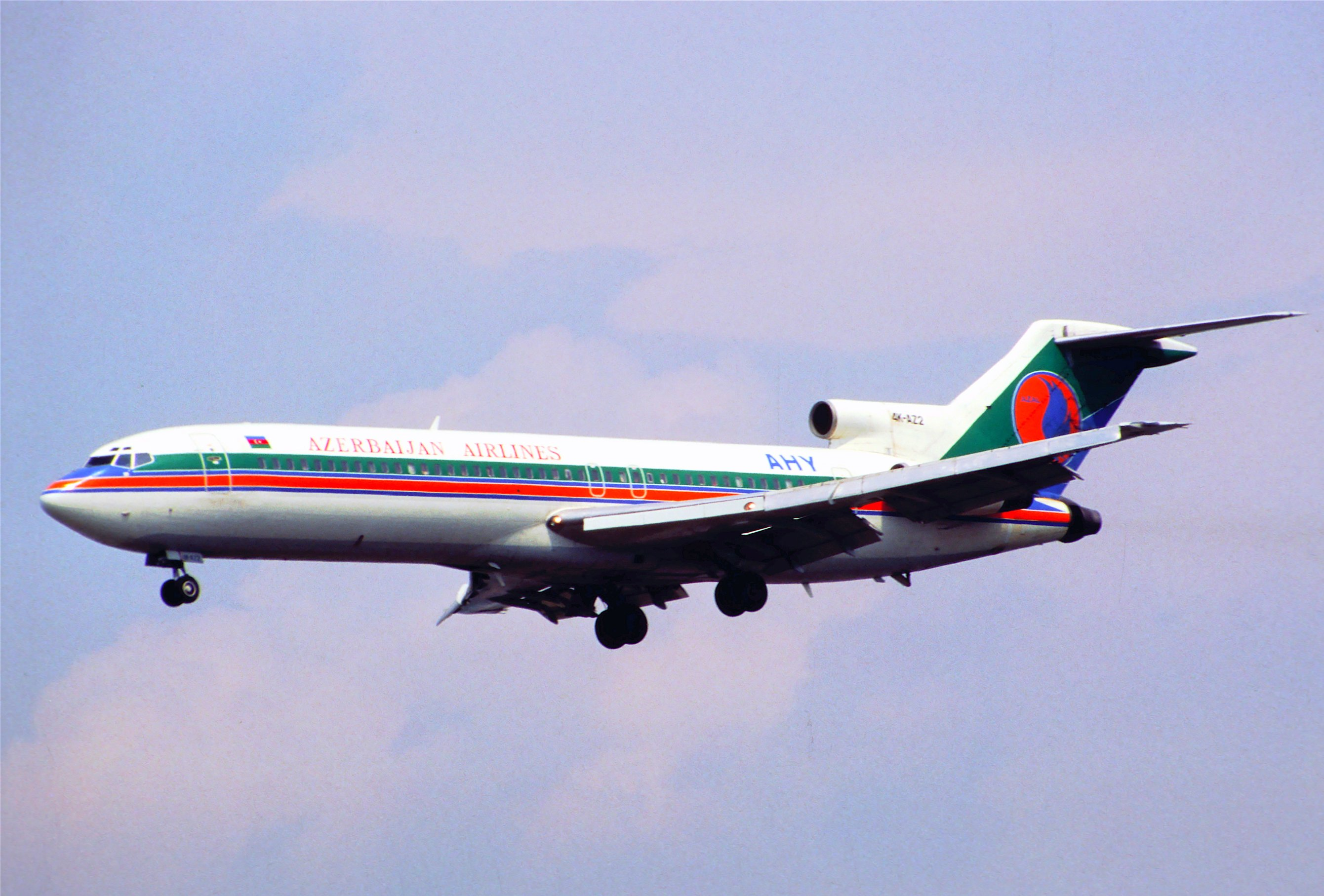
Boeing 727

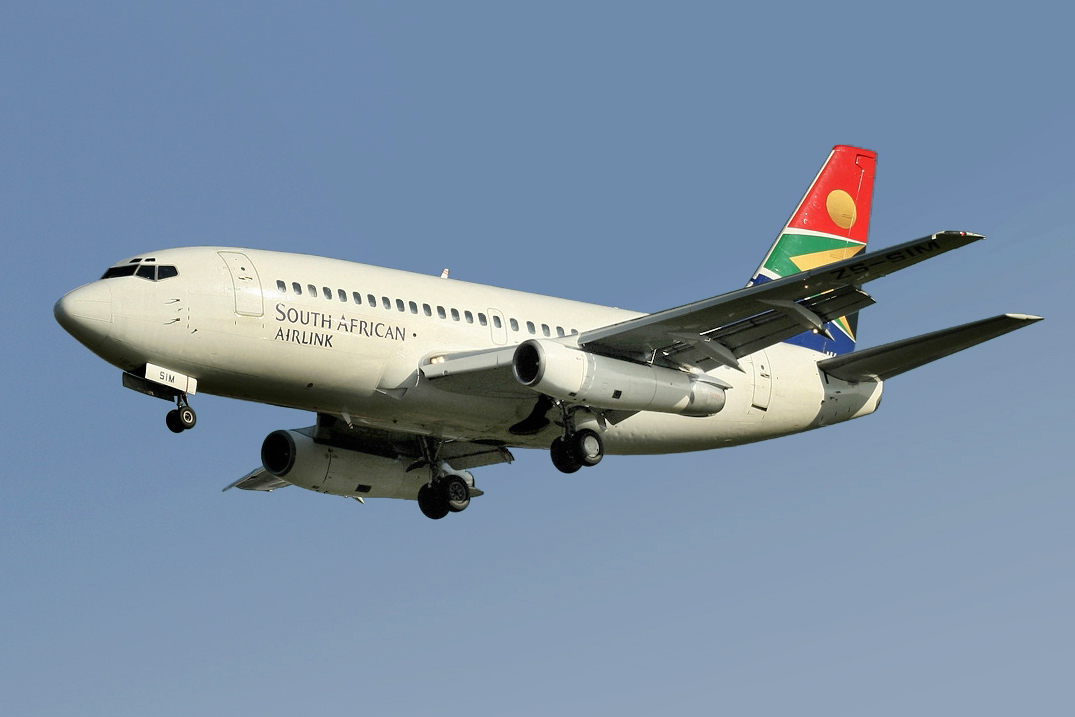
Boeing 737

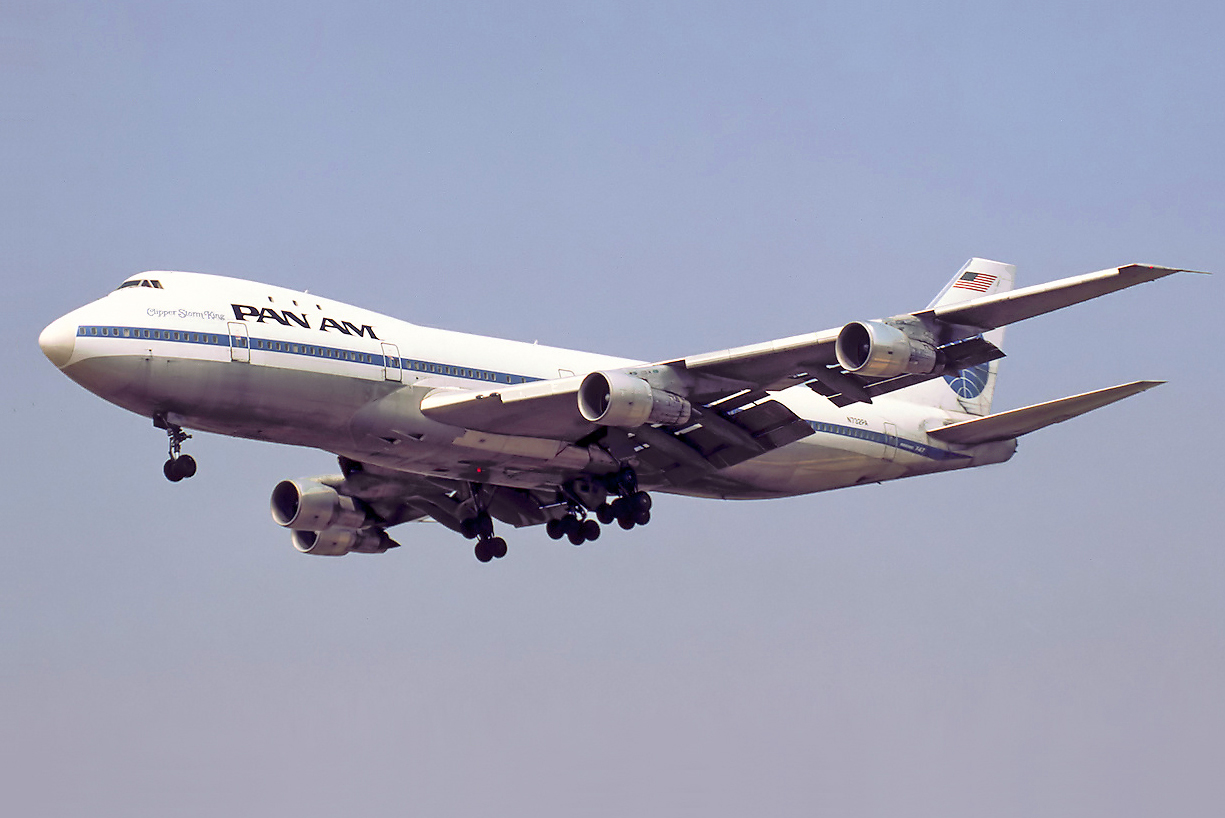
Boeing 747

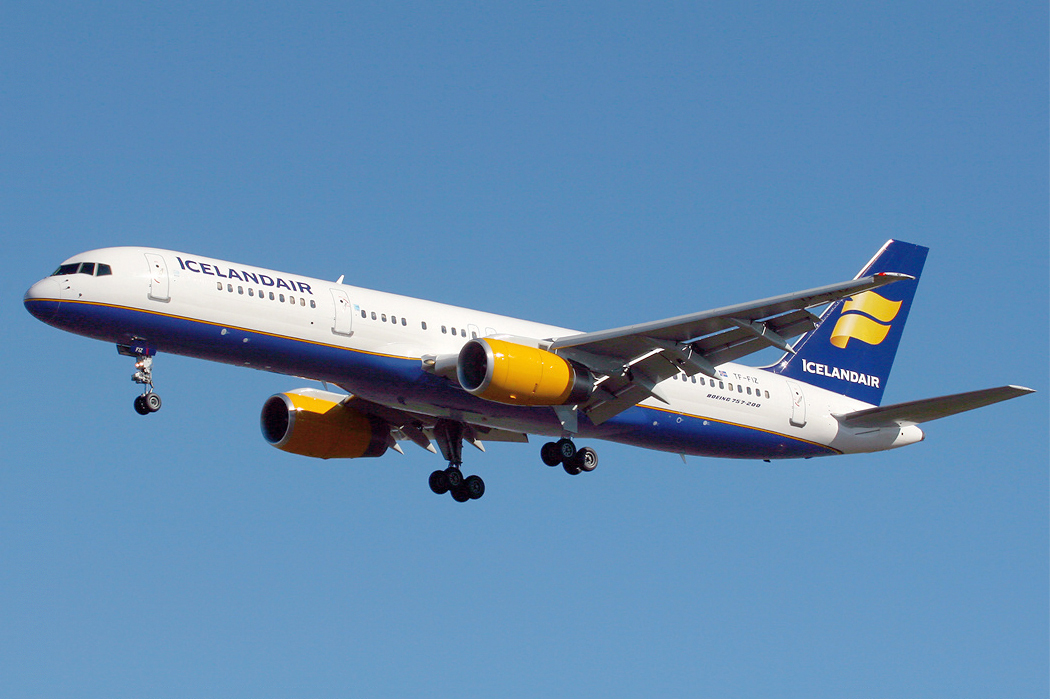
Boeing 757

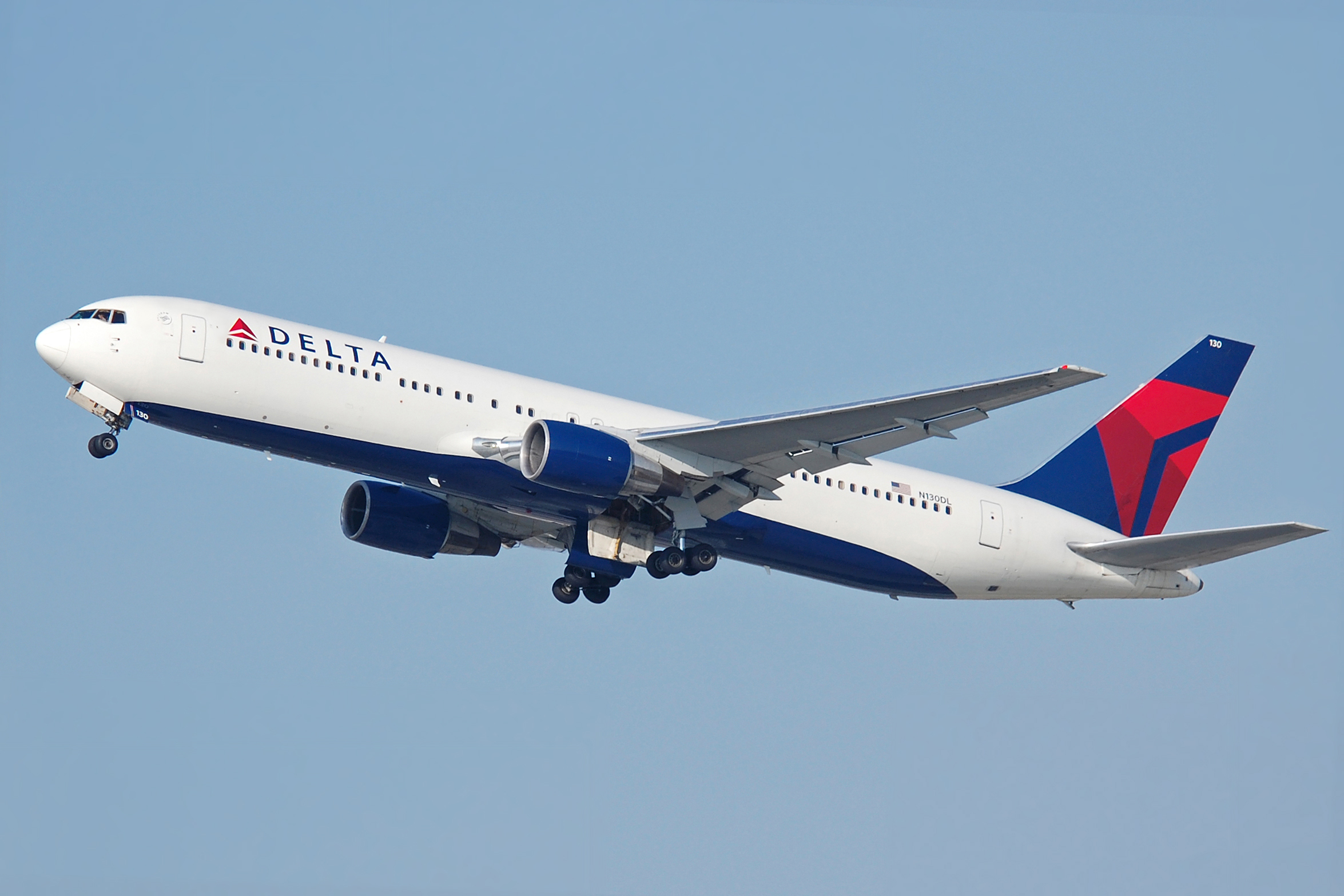
Boeing 767

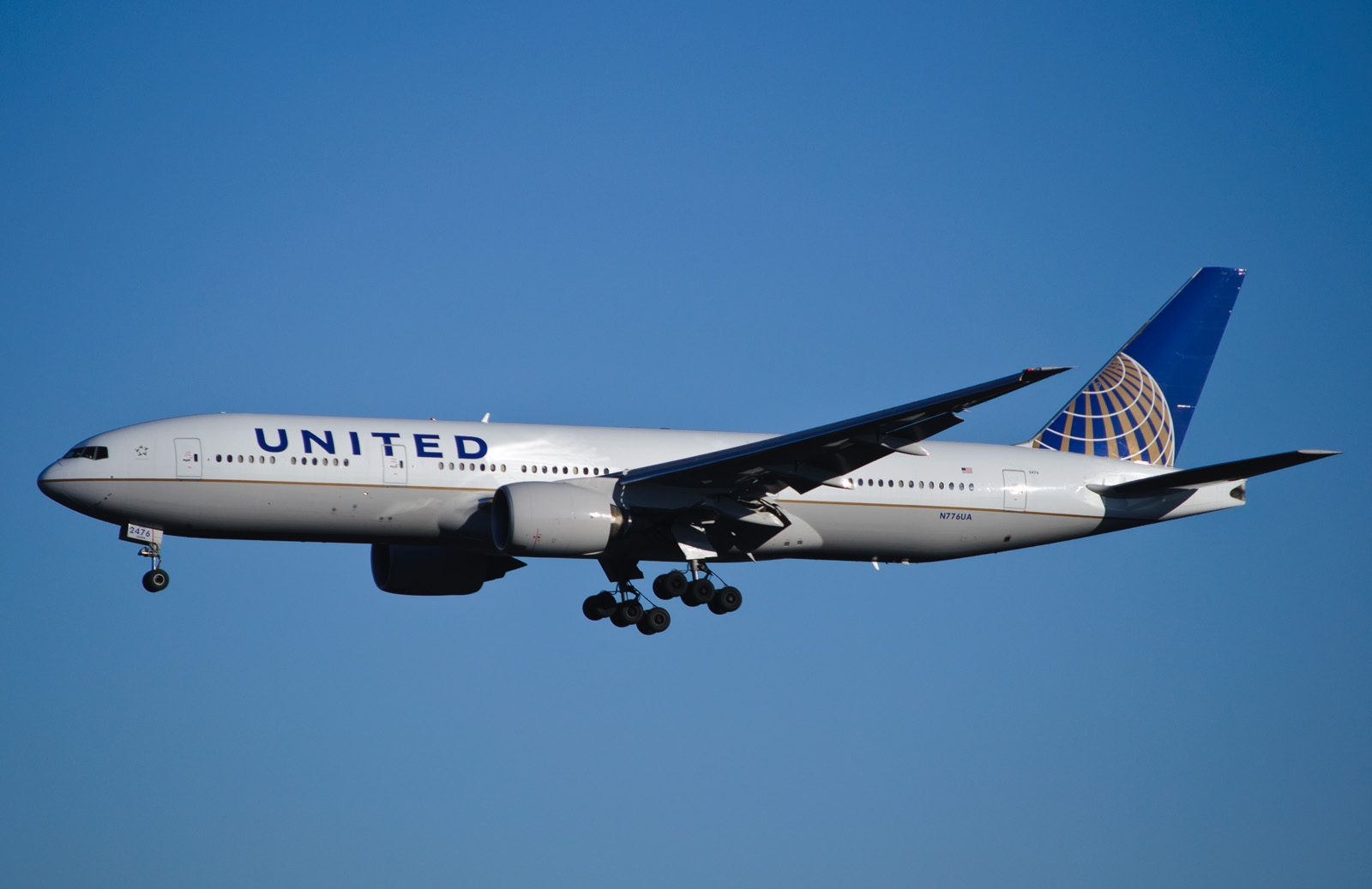
Boeing 777

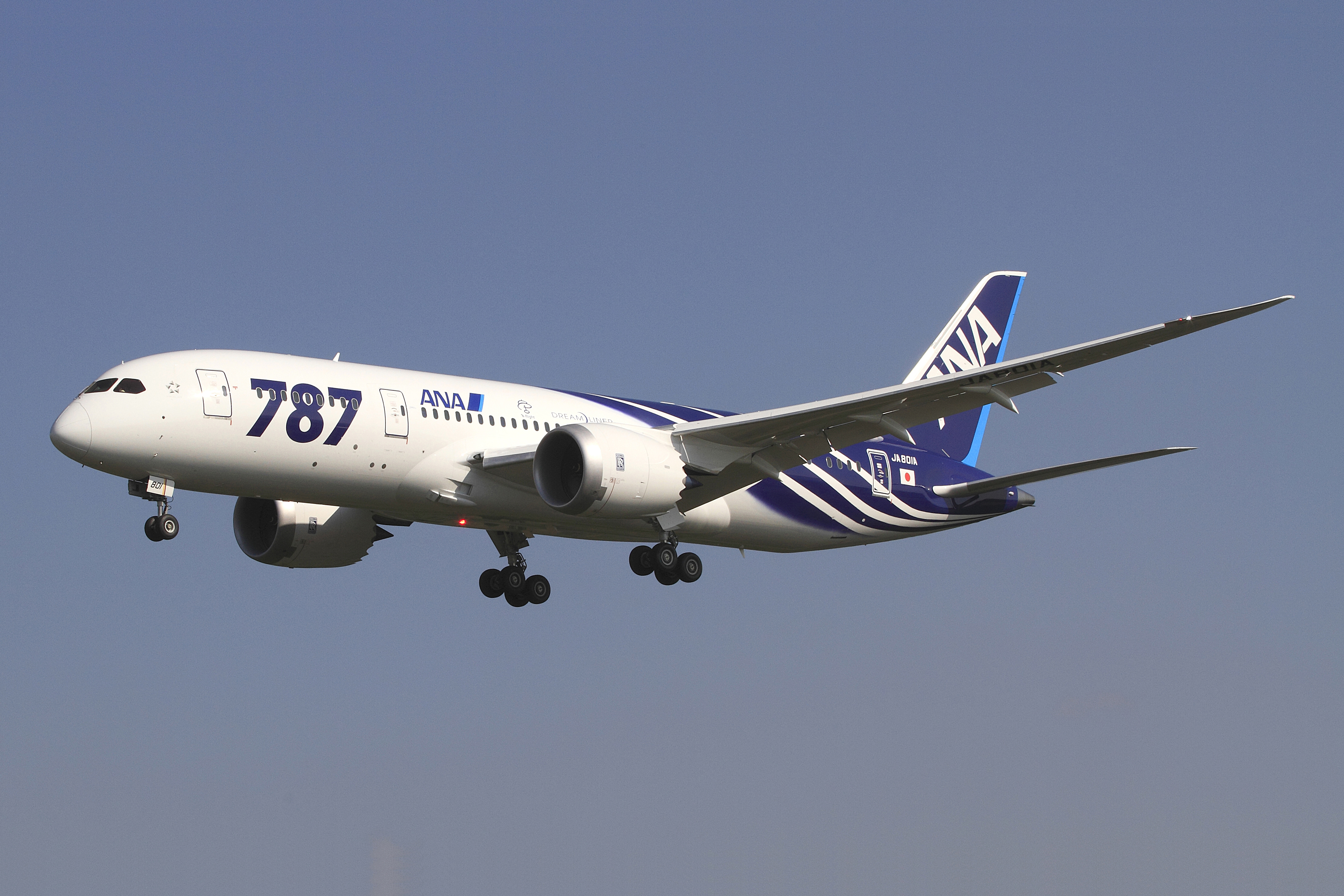
Boeing 787 Dreamliner

=== Specialty and other aircraft ===
Airlines commonly order aircraft with special features or options, but Boeing builds certain models specifically for a particular customer.

- The Boeing 707-138B was a shortened-fuselage, long-range model only sold to Qantas.
- The Boeing 757-200M was a single-example model built for Royal Nepal Airlines (now called Nepal Airlines). This plane could be converted between passenger and freighter configuration. It was launched by Royal Nepal Airlines in 1986 and delivered two years later.
- Boeing 747
  - The Shuttle Carrier Aircraft
  - The Boeing 747 Large Cargo Freighter (now named the Dreamlifter) is a wide-body cargo aircraft.
  - The 747SP production resumed nearly four years after the supposedly final 747SP was built. It had a cockpit crew of two instead of the three-crew layout of other 747SPs.
  - Two Boeing VC-25s were built for the US Air Force as Presidential Air Force One transports. This model was a highly modified 747-200B.
  - Four Boeing 747-100SRs were built for Japan Airlines for a domestic flight service.
  - Nine Boeing 747-100Bs were built for Iran Air and Saudi Arabian Airlines, which had a stronger airframe and landing gear, as well as an increased fuel capacity.
- Boeing was a consultant to Sukhoi on the Russian Regional Jet program that subsequently became the Sukhoi Superjet 100 twin-engine narrowbody airliner.

=== Concepts ===
- Boeing 2707 – supersonic airliner, canceled
- Boeing 7J7 – high-efficiency propfan airliner, canceled
- Boeing 747-300 Trijet – high-efficiency trijet version of the Boeing 747-200, canceled
- Boeing 777-100/777 trijet – the original proposed version of the Boeing 777
- Boeing New Large Airplane – double-deck jumbo airliner, canceled
- Boeing New Midsize Airplane – targeting the middle of the market segment
- Boeing RC-1 – cargo aircraft, canceled
- Boeing Sonic Cruiser – near-sonic airliner, canceled
- Boeing Liquid Hydrogen (LH_{2}) airplane that uses liquid hydrogen as fuel
- Hypersonic Airliner Concept. Mach 5 speed
- Boeing 747-500X, 747-600X, and 747-700X – longer range, and stretched 747 versions
- Boeing X-66 – experimental Transonic Truss-Braced Wing airliner

=== Airfoils ===
- Boeing 103 – used on Model 40 and F2B
- Boeing 103A – used on F2B and F3B
- Boeing 106 – used on Model 80, P-12, Monomail, Model 226
- Boeing 106B – used on Model 95, Model 247D, and P-12
- Boeing 106R – used on various Beriev models
- Boeing 109 – used on Model 95 and P-26
- Boeing 117 – used on XPBB, B-29 and derivatives (307, 367, 377), and all Aero Spacelines models. Tupolev Tu-4, Tu-70, Tu-75, and Tu-80. (Note: While the Tupolev Tu-4, Tu-70, Tu-75, and Tu-80 airplanes do all essentially use Boeing 117 model airfoils, the airfoils themselves were reverse-engineered for use by the Soviet Air Forces from a trio of crashed B-29s.)

== Major facilities ==
- Long Beach, California – Former McDonnell Douglas aircraft assembly, currently supports Boeing Commercial Airplanes
- Seattle – Puget Sound region, Washington
  - Boeing Field, Seattle – Final delivery of 737, flight testing of all aircraft
  - Boeing Everett Factory, Everett, Washington – 737, 767 and 777 production and final assembly plant, largest building in the world
  - Boeing Renton Factory, Renton – 737 production and final assembly plant
- Boeing South Carolina, North Charleston, South Carolina – 787 production and final assembly plant
- Boeing Tulsa, Tulsa, Oklahoma – military and civil production. Portions were spun off as Spirit AeroSystems before being reversed after 20 years.
- Boeing Wichita, Wichita, Kansas – military and civil production. Portions were spun off as Spirit AeroSystems before being reversed after 20 years.

== See also ==
- Airbus
- ATR (aircraft manufacturer)
- Bombardier Aerospace
- Comac
- Competition between Airbus and Boeing
- Embraer
- List of civil aircraft
- United Aircraft Corporation
