= James Albaugh =

American businessman

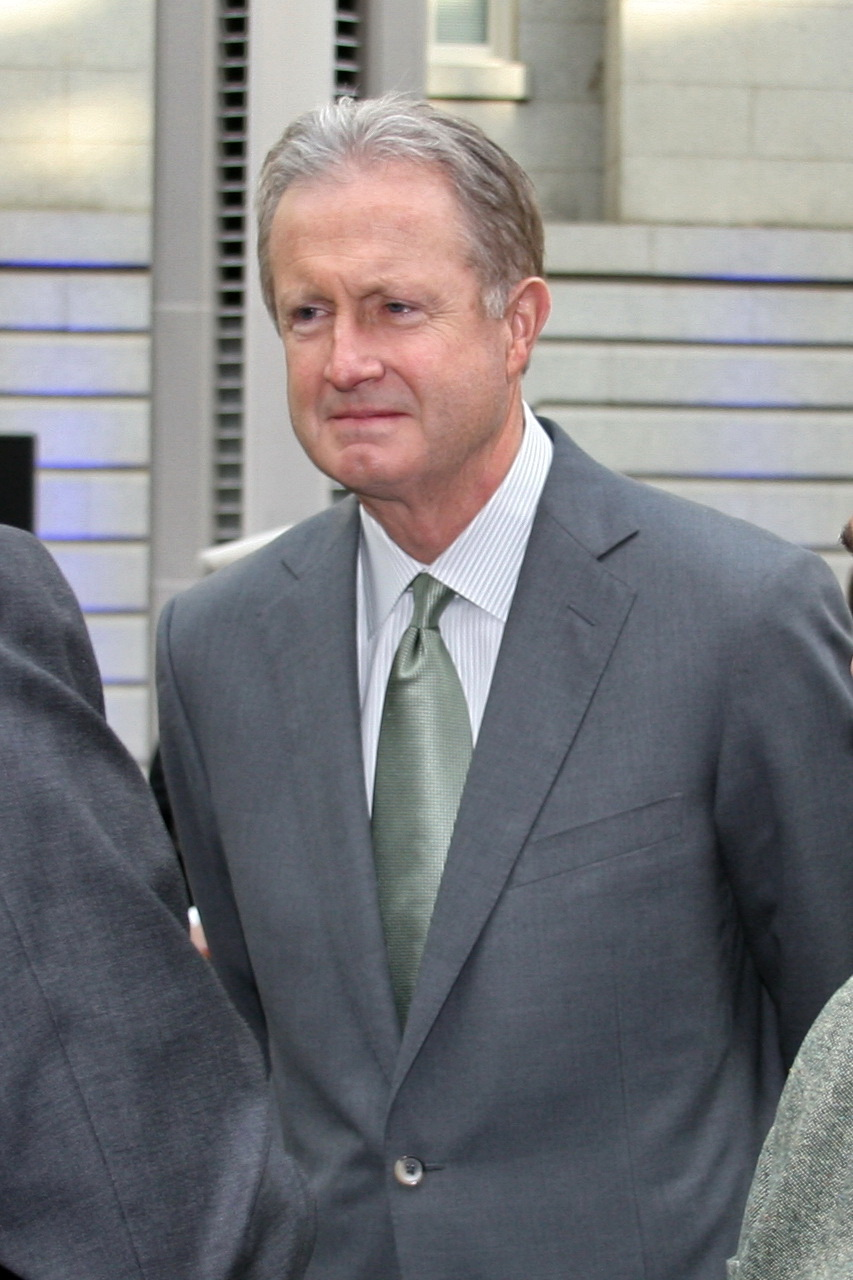
- Albaugh in 2009
- Born: May 31, 1950 (age 76)
- Education: Willamette University; Columbia University
- Employers: Boeing (1975-2012); Boeing Integrated Defense Systems (2002-2009); Boeing Commercial Airplanes (2009-2012)
- Organization: National Academy of Engineering
- Office: President & CEO
- Board member of: Harris Corporation (2016)
- Awards: Howard Hughes Memorial Award

James F. Albaugh (born May 31, 1950) is the former executive vice president of the Boeing Company and chief executive officer of the Boeing Commercial Airplanes business unit. He served in these capacities for Boeing Commercial Airplanes from September 1, 2009, until his retirement on June 26, 2012. He retired from the company on October 1, 2012. He previously served as president and chief executive officer of the Boeing Defense, Space & Security business unit. Albaugh oversaw a $30.8 billion budget while managing over 70,000 personnel in that position. Albaugh earned $1,499,923 in 2005, making him one of the highest-paid managers in the defense sector.

== Early life ==
Albaugh was raised in Richland, Washington. He graduated from Richland High School in Richland, Washington, in 1968. Graduating in the same class with Albaugh was future secretary of defense James Mattis. Albaugh received a bachelor's degree in mathematics and physics from Willamette University (1972) and a master's degree in civil engineering from Columbia University.

== Career ==
In 1975, Albaugh joined Boeing and held various other executive positions. His first assignment at Boeing was at their Richland, Washington, operations in 1975.

From July 2002 to September 2009 Albaugh was president and CEO of Boeing Integrated Defense Systems (presently named Boeing Defense, Space & Security), a business unit of the Boeing Company. From September 2009 to October 2012, Albaugh was president and CEO of Boeing Commercial Airplanes, a business unit of the Boeing Company. On October 1, 2012, Albaugh retired from Boeing Commercial Airplanes.

From December 2012 to July 2016, Albaugh served as a senior advisor to the Blackstone Group.

On September 1, 2016, Albaugh was appointed to the Harris Corporation board of directors.

== Honors and awards ==
Albaugh is a recipient of the Howard Hughes Memorial Award given "to an aerospace leader whose accomplishments over a long career have contributed significantly to the advancement of aviation or space technology." . He was elected to the National Academy of Engineering in 2011 for technical leadership in defense and commercial aerospace industry.

Business positions
Preceded by Scott Carson	President/CEO of Boeing Commercial Airplanes; 2009-2012	Succeeded by Raymond Conner
