= Airpac Enterprises =

Airpac Enterprises, Inc.
- Type: Private company
- Industry: Aerospace Aircraft MRO and Interiors
- Founded: 1995
- Founder: Nik and Lisa Rajic
- Headquarters: California, United States
- Products: Aircraft Maintenance, Repair and Overhaul
- Owner: Lisa Rajic
- Website: airpacx.com

Airpac Enterprises, Inc., commonly known as Airpac, is a United States company based in California in the vicinity of Sylmar, known for their airline seat and aircraft overhaul. The company provides fully merged aircraft maintenance, repair, and operations (MRO) and interiors services for all kind of airline operators. Airpac is a licensed and authorized portion of 145 FAA and EASA repair service by Federal Aviation Regulations. Their refurbishment services include tray tables, arm caps, carpet serging, painting, and components. They specialize in Avio, BE Aerospace, Embraer, Ipeco, Koito, Recaro, Sicma, Sogerma, and Zodiac Seats. The company was founded in 1995 by Nikola Rajic as a small shop in Van Nuys, California, and is today a certified SBO and WBE corporation.

== Airliner seats ==
Airpac manufactures seat parts for airliners, including crew seats, first class and business class. Customers include the regional and international airlines, Horizon Air, V Australia, 20th Century Fox, Boeing Capital, Royal Netherlands Air Force, Lufthansa Technik, Jat Airways, and Air North.
