= Howard Hughes Memorial Award =

The Howard Hughes Memorial Award is an aviation industry award presented annually by the Aero Club of Southern California. According to the Association's official website, the award is given "to an aerospace leader whose accomplishments over a long career have contributed significantly to the advancement of aviation or space technology."

The award was established in 1978 by William R. Lummis, a first cousin of aviation pioneer Howard Hughes, who at the time was Chairman of the Board and Chief Executive Officer of Summa Corp. Recipients of the Howard Hughes Memorial Award receive a solid silver medallion cast from silver mined from Hughes' Nevada mining operations.

== Recipients ==
- Jack Northrop
- Jimmy Doolittle
- Lawrence A. Hyland
- Robert Six
- Kelly Johnson
- Chuck Yeager
- Ed Heinemann
- Barry Goldwater
- Pete Conrad
- Allen E. Paulson
- Simon Ramo
- Jack Real
- Ben Rich
- Clifton Moore
- Lee Atwood
- Harry Wetzel
- Bobbi Trout
- Thomas Victor Jones
- Allen Puckett
- Paul MacCready
- John Brizendine
- Willis Hawkins
- Sam F. Iacobellis
- Kent Kresa
- Neil Armstrong
- Frank D. Robinson
- Burt Rutan
- Eileen Collins
- James Albaugh
- Ron Sugar
- Bob Hoover
- Fred Smith
- Clay Lacy
- Steven F. Udvar-Házy
- Edward Stone, 2014

== See also ==
- List of aviation awards
