= Boeing Model 81 =

Training aircraft built by Boeing

Model 81 / XN2B
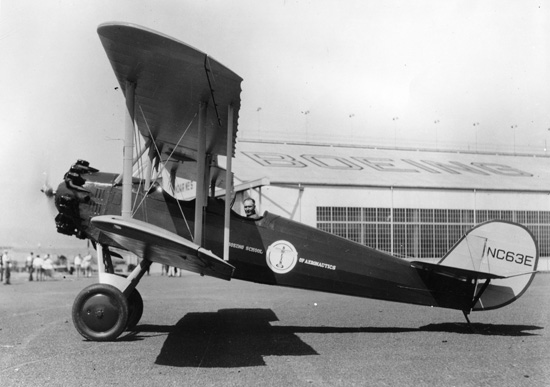

General information
- Type: trainer
- National origin: United States
- Manufacturer: Boeing
- Primary user: Boeing School
- Number built: 2

History
- Introduction date: 1928
- Developed from: Boeing Model 64

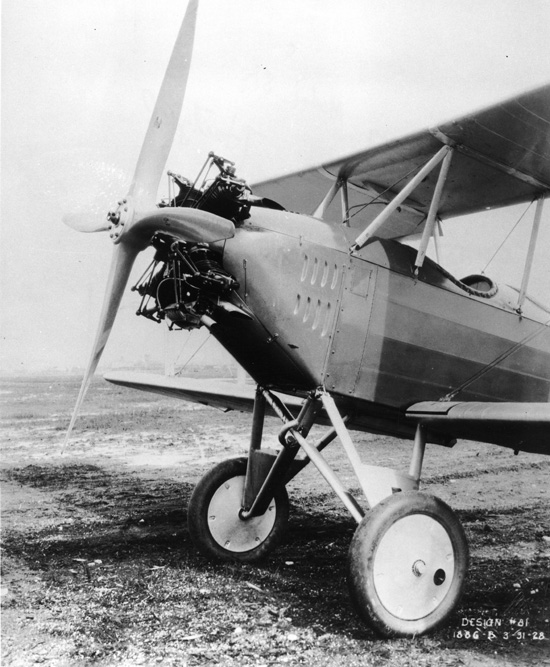
Closeup of Boeing 81 showing 125 hp Fairchild-Caminez 4-cylinder radial engine

The Boeing Model 81 was an American training aircraft built by Boeing in 1928. The Model 81 was a development of the Model 64. It was powered by a newly developed engine, the 125 hp Fairchild-Caminez 4-cylinder radial engine. Operating at a much lower rpm than most engines (1000 rpm) it required the use of a large high-pitch propeller.

After initial flight tests with the Fairchild-Caminez, the prototype was refitted with a 145 hp Axelson engine, redesignated Model 81A and delivered to the Boeing School of Aeronautics. There, it was re-engined a number of times, first with a 115 hp Axelson engine, redesignated Model 81B. It then received a 165 hp Wright J-6-5, then a 100 hp Kinner K-5 and a redesigned vertical tail. Redesignated Model 81C, it would later be removed from training service, re-engined with an Axelson engine, and used as a classroom trainer.

On 21 June 1928, the second Model 81 built was delivered to the US Navy at Anacostia, Maryland for $8,300, and redesignated Boeing XN2B. Its trial with the Fairchild engine was unsatisfactory, and on 10 January 1929 it was refitted by Wright Aeronautical with a 160 hp Wright J-6-5 engine. Despite increased performance, it was not ordered into production.

== Variants ==
81
Original Caminez-engined aircraft
81A
145 hp Axelson engine
81B
115 hp Axelson engine
81C
100 hp Kinner K-5, redesigned tail.
XN2B
US Navy designation.

== Operators ==
United States

- Boeing School of Aeronautics

== Specifications (XN2B) ==
Data from Bowers, 1989. p. 144

General characteristics

- Crew: 2
- Length: 25 ft 8 in (7.82 m)
- Wingspan: 35 ft 0 in (10.67 m)
- Height: 11 ft 2 in (3.40 m)
- Wing area: 259 sq ft (24.06 m^{2})
- Empty weight: 1,652 lb (750 kg)
- Gross weight: 2,178 lb (988 kg)
- Powerplant: 1 × Fairchild-Caminez , 125 hp (93 kW)

Performance

- Maximum speed: 103.9 mph (167 km/h, 90.3 kn)
- Cruise speed: 86 mph (138 km/h, 75 kn)
- Range: 335 mi (539 km, 291 nmi)
- Service ceiling: 12,000 ft (3,660 m)
- Rate of climb: 515 ft/min (2.62 m/s)
