= Jack Real =

Jack G. Real
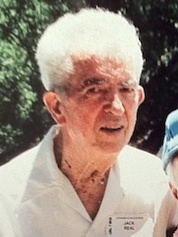
- Jack G. Real
- Born: May 31, 1915; Calumet, Michigan
- Died: September 6, 2005 (aged 90); Mission Hills, California
- Citizenship: United States
- Education: Michigan Technological University
- Occupation: Aeronautical engineer
- Known for: Aircraft design

Jack G. Real (May 31, 1915 – September 6, 2005) was an aerospace pioneer and Howard Hughes confidant.

== Career at Lockheed ==
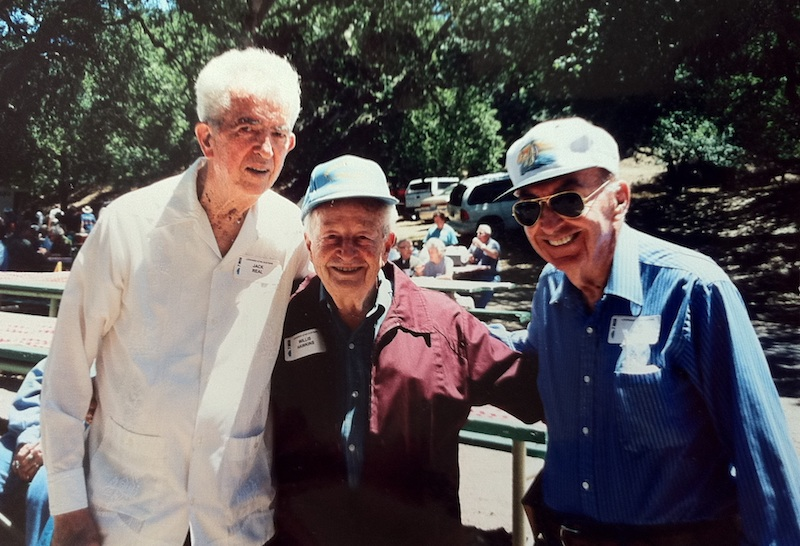
Jack Real, left; Willis Hawkins, center; Joseph Ware, Jr., right, taken at a StarDusters gathering. Photograph by Jennifer Ware.

After graduating from Calumet High School in Calumet, Michigan he quickly moved on to attend Michigan Technological University, graduating in 1937. Real moved to California in 1939 and went to work for Lockheed. Less than a year later he was promoted to senior design engineer on the Lockheed Model 18 Lodestar program. That move led to designing, developing and testing many of the company's aircraft projects from the Lockheed Hudson bomber to the Lockheed Constellation.

Real was loaned to Pan American Airways for more than a year in 1943 to learn about commercial aircraft development. He served as a flight engineer for Pan Am on the South American and African routes. Back at Lockheed, he was assigned to work with aviation pioneer Kelly Johnson, and became division engineer for all flight test activities in 1957, and then chief of engineering flight test in 1960. He also was a flight test engineer on the first flight of the Lockheed C-130 Hercules on 23 August 1954. Two years later, his career advanced again with a promotion to chief engineer of research, development and testing. During 1964, he concentrated on the SR-71 Blackbird development with Johnson and Joseph F. Ware, Jr. at the Lockheed Skunk Works and worked on aircraft testing projects at the Area 51 military base in southern Nevada. He was also in charge of the development of the Lockheed CL-475 and Lockheed XH-51 helicopters. By 1965, he was vice president and general manager for the Lockheed AH-56 Cheyenne helicopter program and by 1968 Lockheed had made him responsible for all of the company's rotary wing aircraft programs. From 1964 to 1965, he attended the University of Southern California School of Business.

== Involvement with Howard Hughes ==
Real met Howard Hughes in November 1957, while working at Lockheed and became Hughes' personal adviser. In May 1965, Real was one of the figures involved in Hughes Helicopters bid to the US government for what became the Hughes OH-6 Cayuse. It is reported that Howard Hughes directed his company to submit a bid at a price below the actual production cost of the helicopter, in order to secure this order, resulting in substantial losses on the US Army deal, with the anticipation that an extended production cycle would eventually prove financially viable.

In 1971, Hughes pleaded with Real to leave the Lockheed Aircraft Company and reorganize his troubled helicopter company. Real was looking forward to retirement, but out of loyalty to Hughes, he accepted the challenge. In 1979, three years after Hughes' death, Real became president of the troubled Hughes Helicopter, accomplishing over four years one of business history's most impressive corporate turn-around efforts. While heading the company, he also guided the development of the AH-64 Apache helicopter program for the US Army. The program was so successful that in 1984 he oversaw the sale of Hughes Helicopters to McDonnell Douglas and became president and CEO of that company until his retirement in 1987.

On Thanksgiving Eve 1970, Hughes suffered from a bout with pneumonia. Jack Real arranged for Hughes to be secretly moved by aircraft to the Bahamas. Real played a role in the later years of Hughes' life that aides, dubbed as the "Mormon Mafia", perceived as disruptive and inconvenient. After his death, one of Hughes' bodyguards, Gordi Margulis, was quoted as saying that Real and Hughes often spent hours on the telephone talking about aviation. He said, "Jack was a really great guy who cared about Howard and did everything he could to help him."

In retirement, he played a key role in relocating the Spruce Goose to the Evergreen Aviation & Space Museum in McMinnville, Oregon where he was Chairman and President from 1995-2001.

== Honors and awards ==
During his life, Real was affiliated with the Association of the United States Army, Army Aviation Association of America, and the National Aerospace Council of the Society of Automotive Engineers. He served as a director at large for the American Helicopter Society and American Institute of Aeronautics and Astronautics. He also served on the executive board of the Boy Scouts of America and as a director with the California State University System, Davey Industries, Engineering School Board of Overseers of the University of Pennsylvania, Evergreen International Aviation, Engineering School of Loyola Marymount University, Hughes Airwest and Midway Airlines.

Aviation may have dominated his life, but he had another lifelong dedication, which was to scouting. Along with President Gerald R. Ford, Bob Hope, and General Jimmy Doolittle, in 1983, Real became only the fourth person to receive the prestigious Americanism Award, which is "given to individuals of national stature who have made outstanding contributions to their community and profession."

He is a recipient of the Howard Hughes Memorial Award presented by the Southern California Aeronautic Association to give recognition "to an aerospace leader whose accomplishments over a long career have contributed significantly to the advancement of aviation or space technology." In 1983, under Real's leadership, Hughes Helicopters received the Robert J. Collier Trophy, American aviation's highest aeronautics achievement honor for his role in developing the AH-64 Apache helicopter. He shared the award with Secretary of the Army Jack Marsh.

In addition to the Collier Trophy and the Boy Scouts of America's Americanism Award, he received numerous awards and honors over his career. They included the Helicopter Association International's Lifetime Member Award (2005); Distinguished Alumni Award, Calumet High School, Calumet, Michigan (2004); Oregon Aviation Hall of Honor (2003); The Chuck Yeager Award (1996); The Howard Hughes Memorial Award (1996); Pioneers In Aviation's Flight Path award, Los Angeles International Airport (1996); Michigan Technological University's Distinguished Alumnus Award (1995) and Elder Statesman of Aviation and National Aeronautical Association (1989). He received honorary doctorate degrees from Northrop University (1985), the Aeronautical Science Selma College (1983) and Michigan Technological University (1968).

In 2003, he published a book, The Asylum of Howard Hughes (ISBN 978-1413408751).

Jack Real died September 6, 2005.
