= Competition between Airbus and Boeing =

Rivalry between the two biggest aircraft manufacturers

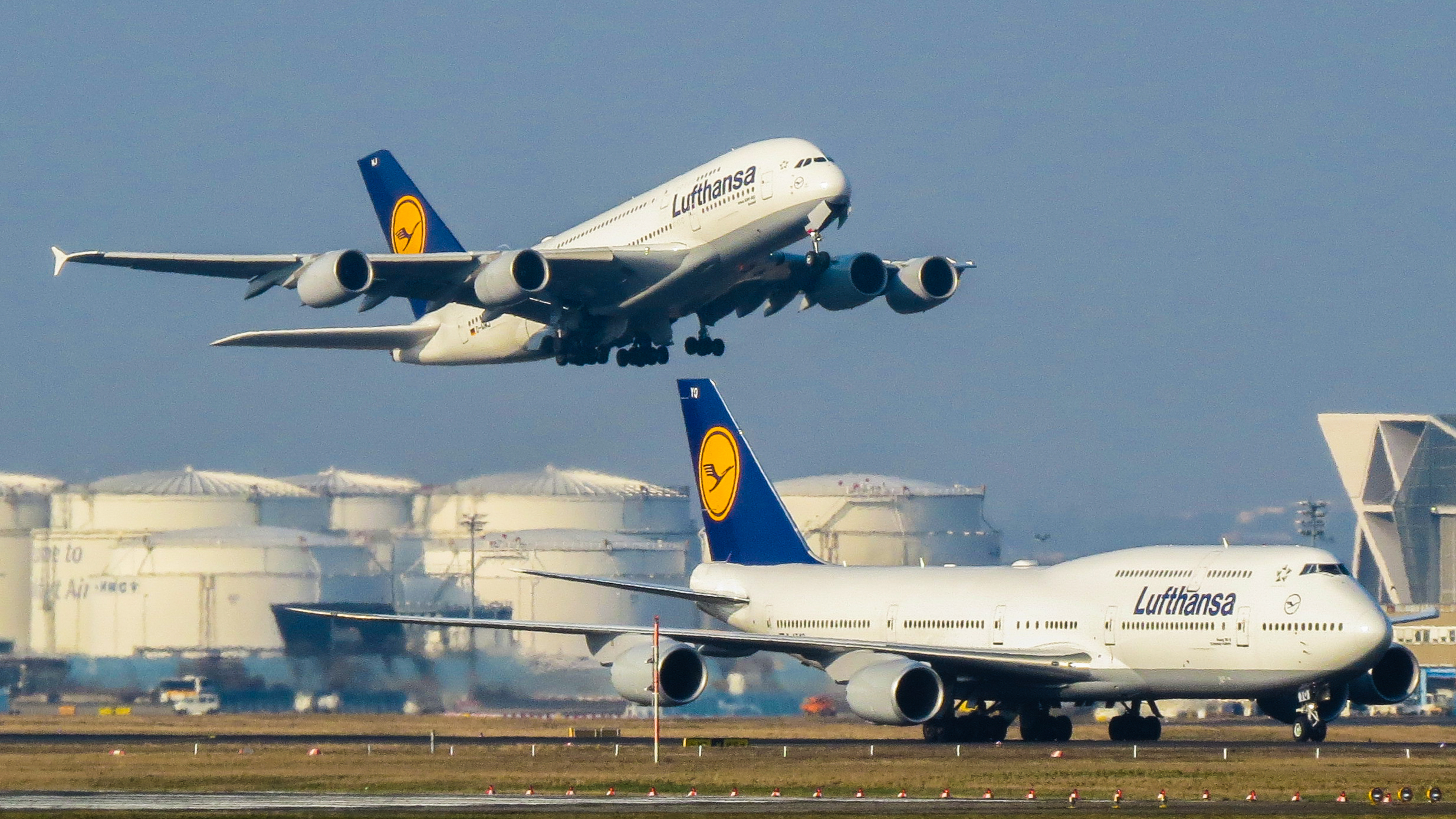
A Lufthansa Airbus A380 and Boeing 747-8 at Frankfurt Airport in 2015

The competition between Airbus and Boeing has been characterized as a duopoly in the large jet airliner market since the 1990s.

The duopoly resulted from a series of mergers within the global aerospace industry, with Airbus beginning as a pan-European consortium while the American Boeing absorbed its former arch-rival, McDonnell Douglas, in 1997. Other manufacturers, such as Lockheed Martin and Convair in the United States, and Fokker in Europe, were no longer able to compete and effectively withdrew from this market. British Aerospace (now BAE Systems) joined the consortium in 1979.

In the ten years from 2015 to 2024, Airbus received orders for 8,950 aircraft and delivered 7,043, while Boeing received net orders for 5,012 aircraft and delivered 5,312. During their period of intense competition, both companies regularly accused each other of receiving unfair state aid from their respective governments.

In 2019, Airbus displaced Boeing as the largest aerospace company by revenue.

In October 2019, the A320 family became the highest-selling airliner family with 15,193 orders, surpassing the Boeing 737's total of 15,136.

In 2023, the number of Airbus aircraft in service surpassed Boeing for the first time.

Even in the 21st century there have been attempts to challenge the duopoly. The attempt by Bombardier ended with its C-Series being acquired by Airbus and renamed the Airbus A220. Both Russia and China produce some jet airliners, mostly for the domestic market, with the Sukhoi Superjet achieving a low number of international orders prior to the 2022 Russian invasion of Ukraine. Comac has a product similar to the Boeing 737 and the Airbus A320 family with the Comac C919 which has 1,005 total orders (compared to 11,179 for the A320neo family and 6,779 for the Boeing 737 MAX) on the order book, mostly from Chinese airlines.

== Competing products ==
=== Passenger capacity and range comparison ===
Airbus and Boeing have wide product ranges, including single-aisle and wide-body aircraft, covering a variety of combinations of capacity and range.

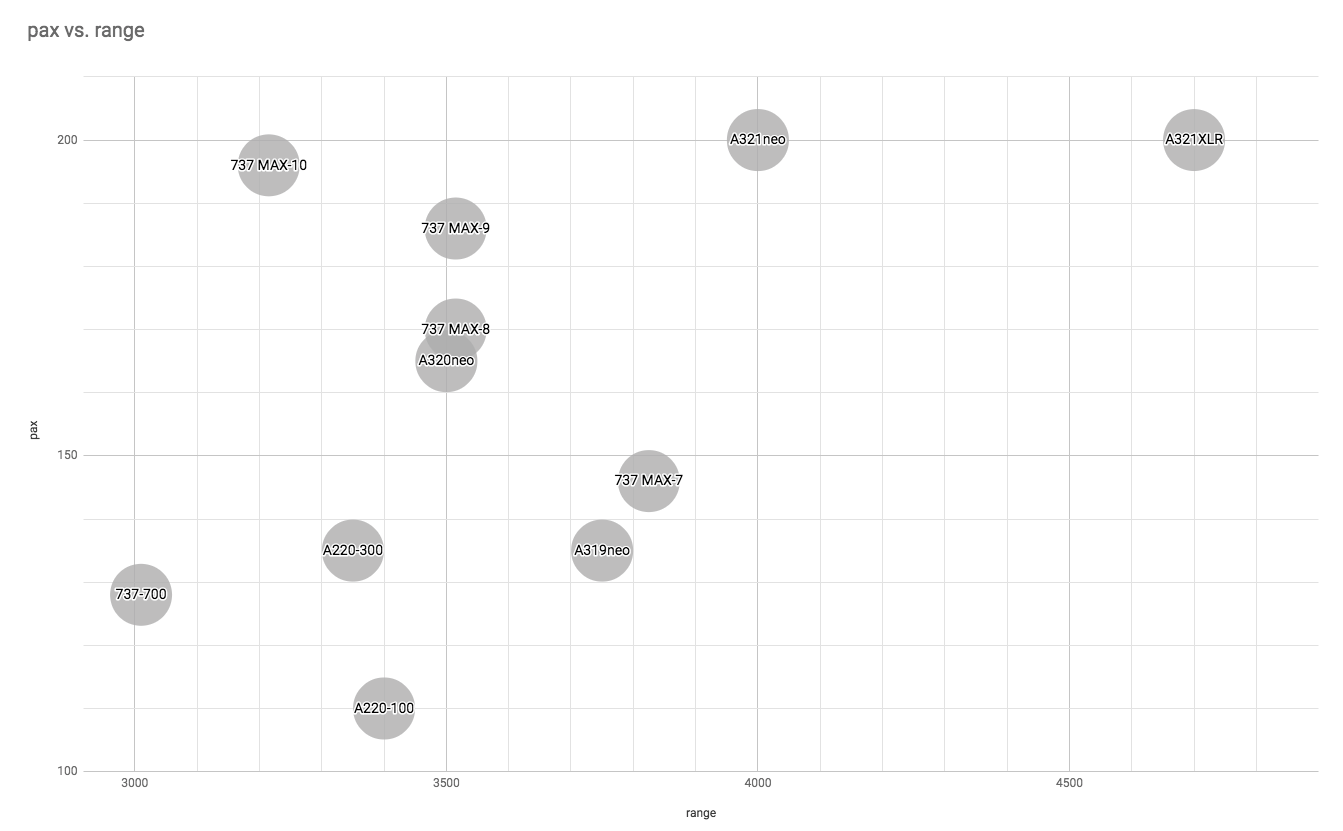
Narrowbody passenger capacity and range comparison

Single-aisle craft: Airbus, 737
Type	Length	Span	MTOW	pax	Range	List price
Airbus A220-100	35.0 m	35.1 m	63.7 t	100–120	3,600 nmi (6,700 km)	US$79.5M
Airbus A220-300	38.7 m	35.1 m	70.9 t	120–150	3,400 nmi (6,300 km)	US$89.5M
Airbus A319neo	33.84 m	35.8 m	75.5 t	120–150	3,700 nmi (6,900 km)	US$101.5M
Boeing 737-7	35.56 m	35.9 m	80.3 t	135–160	3,800 nmi (7,000 km)	US$96.0M
Airbus A320neo	37.57 m	35.8 m	79.0 t	150–180	3,400 nmi (6,300 km)	US$110.6M
Boeing 737-8	39.52 m	35.9 m	82.6 t	160–180	3,500 nmi (6,500 km)	US$117.1M
Boeing 737-9	42.16 m	35.9 m	88.3 t	175–195	3,300 nmi (6,100 km)	US$120.2M
Boeing 737-10	43.8 m	35.9 m	89.8 t	185–210	3,100 nmi (5,700 km)	US$129.9M
Airbus A321neo	44.51 m	35.8 m	97.0 t	180–220	4,000 nmi (7,400 km)	US$129.5M
Airbus A321XLR	44.51 m	35.8 m	101.0 t	206–220	4,700 nmi (8,700 km)	unknown

Table definitions: MTOW: Maximum Takeoff Weight pax: Passenger capacity

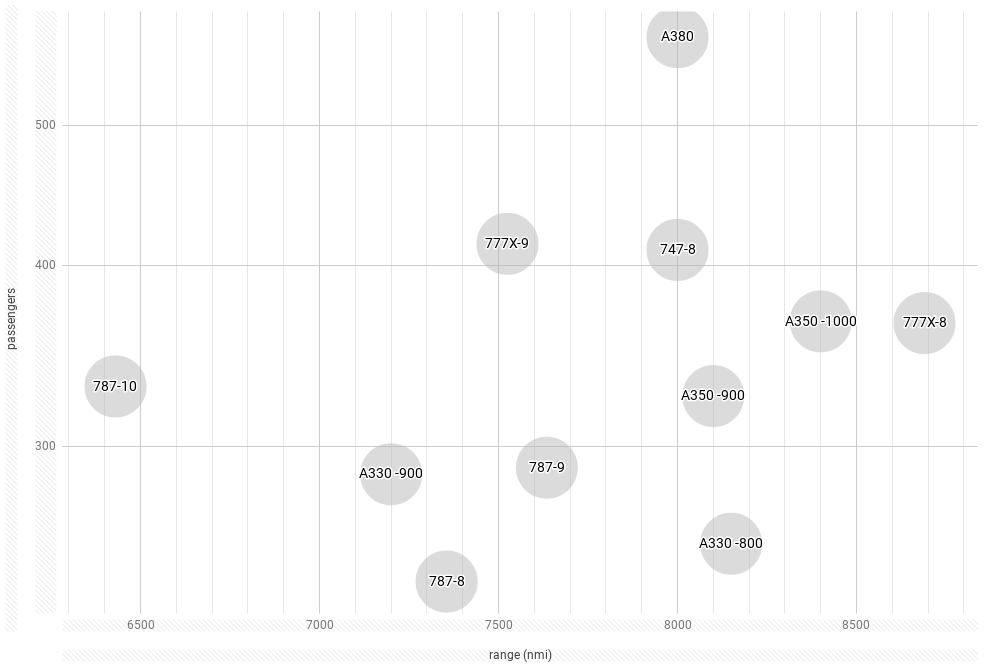
Widebody passenger capacity and range comparison

Widebodies : Airbus, 787, 777X, 747
Type	length	span	MTOW	pax	range	list price
Boeing 787-8	56.7 m	60.1 m	227.9 t	200-275	8,000 nmi (15,000 km)	US$239.0M
Airbus A330neo-800	58.36 m	64.0 m	251.0 t	257-271	8,100 nmi (15,000 km)	US$259.9M
Airbus A330neo-900	63.69 m	64.0 m	253.0 t	287-303	7,350 nmi (13,610 km)	US$296.4M
Boeing 787-9	62.8 m	60.1 m	259.2 t	250-325	8,300 nmi (15,400 km)	US$281.6M
Airbus A350-900	66.8 m	64.75 m	283.0 t	332-352	8,600 nmi (15,900 km)	US$317.4M
Airbus A350-900 ULR	66.8 m	64.75 m	280.0 t	300-350	9,700 nmi (18,000 km)	unknown
Boeing 787-10	68.3 m	60.1 m	260.4 t	300-375	7,500 nmi (13,900 km)	US$325.8M
Boeing 777X-8	70.86 m	71.75 m	365.1 t	350-425	9,500 nmi (17,600 km)	US$394.9M
Airbus A350-1000	73.78 m	64.75 m	324.0 t	375-400	9,100 nmi (16,900 km)	US$366.5M
Boeing 777X-9	76.72 m	71.75 m	351.5 t	375-450	8,000 nmi (15,000 km)	US$425.8M
Boeing 747-8	76.3 m	68.4 m	447.7 t	410	7,370 nmi (13,650 km)	US$402.9M
Airbus A380	72.7 m	79.8 m	575.0 t	575	8,000 nmi (15,000 km)	US$445.6M

=== Cargo capacity and range comparison ===
Type	length	span	MTOW	capacity	range	list price (USD)
A320P2F	37.6 m	35.8 m	78.0 t	21.4 t	2,020 nmi (3,740 km)	converted
737-800BCF	39.5 m	35.8 m	79.0 t	22.7 t	2,025 nmi (3,750 km)	converted
A321P2F	44.51 m	35.8 m	93.5 t	28.1 t	1,850 nmi (3,430 km)	converted
767-300F	54.94 m	47.57 m	186.9 t	52.4 t	3,255 nmi (6,028 km)	$203.7M
767-300BCF	54.94 m	50.9 m	186.9 t	51.6 t	3,345 nmi (6,195 km)	converted
A330-200P2F	58.82 m	60.3 m	233.0 t	59.0 t	4,200 nmi (7,800 km)	converted
A330-200F	58.82 m	60.3 m	187.0 t	61.0 t	4,200 nmi (7,800 km)	$237.0M
A330-300P2F	63.66 m	60.3 m	233.0 t	62.0 t	3,700 nmi (6,900 km)	converted
777F	63.7 m	64.8 m	347.8 t	102.0 t	4,970 nmi (9,200 km)	$325.7M
A350F	70.8 m	64.75 m	319.0 t	111.0 t	4,700 nmi (8,700 km)	$451.7M
747-8F	76.3 m	68.4 m	447.7 t	137.7 t	4,120 nmi (7,630 km)	$387.5M

=== Small single aisles ===
In October 2017, Airbus took a 50.01% stake in the Bombardier CSeries programme. Airbus took control of the CSeries on 1 July 2018 and renamed it Airbus A220.

=== Single aisles: A320 vs 737 ===
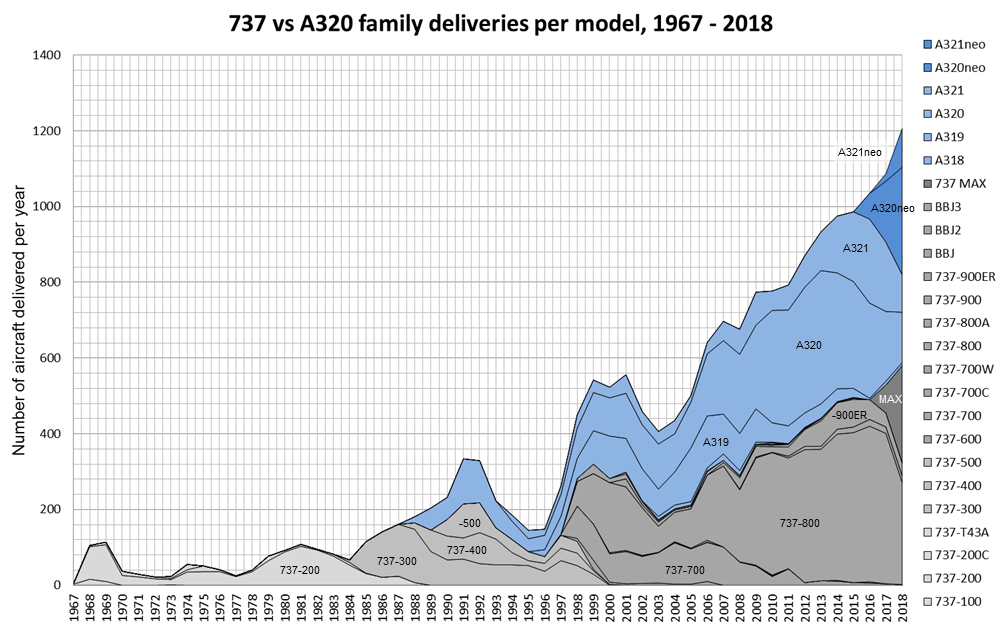
737 vs A320 family deliveries per model 1967–2018

Airbus sold the A320 family aircraft well to low-cost startups, and the choice of engines was offered to make it more attractive to airlines and lessors than the single-sourced Boeing 737 family. While the 737NG series outsold the A320ceo family since its introduction in 1988, in 2001, and in 2007, the latter became the best-selling jet airliner in 2002, and in 2005–2006.

By July 2021, Airbus (including the A220) had a 65% share of the single-aisle backlog compared to Boeing's 35% share.

By September 2018, there were 7,251 A320ceo family aircraft in service versus 6,757 737NGs, while at year end there were 7,506 A320 family versus 7,310 Boeing 737 overall.

In October 2025, following Boeing's crisis caused by accidents in years 2018 and 2019, Airbus A320 family overtook Boeing 737 as the most-delivered jetliner with 12,260 deliveries in total at the time.

Airbus:; Boeing:; View source data.

=== Twin aisles ===
The ultra-long-range variants of new types enable new routes between far-away city pairs: the 9,700 nmi (18,000 km) Airbus A350-900 ULR entered service in 2018 and the 8,745 nmi (16,196 km) Boeing 777-8 was initially expected in 2022 but was not in service as of July 2026.

=== Jumbo twin aisles: A380 vs 747 ===
Cross-section comparison of the Airbus A380 (full-length double deck) and the front section of Boeing 747-400 (upper deck only in forward section)

During the 1990s, both companies researched the feasibility of a passenger aircraft larger than the Boeing 747, then the largest airliner in operation. Airbus launched a full-length double-deck aircraft, the A380, a decade later while Boeing decided the project would not be commercially viable and developed the third-generation Boeing 747-8 instead. The Airbus A380 and Boeing 747-8 were thus in direct competition on long-haul routes.

Rival performance claims by Airbus and Boeing appeared contradictory, their methodologies unclear, and neither validated by a third-party source. An independent analysis showed fuel consumption per seat of 3.27 L/100 km for the A380 and 3.35 L/100 km for the B747-8I; a hypothetical re-engined A380neo would have achieved 2.82 to 2.65 L/100 km per seat, depending on the options selected.

== Modes of competition ==
=== Outsourcing ===
Because many of the world's airlines are wholly or partially government-owned, aircraft procurement decisions are often taken according to political criteria in addition to commercial ones. Boeing and Airbus seek to exploit this by subcontracting the production of aircraft components or assemblies to manufacturers in countries of strategic importance in order to gain a competitive advantage overall.

For example, Boeing has maintained longstanding relationships since 1974 with Japanese suppliers including Mitsubishi Heavy Industries and Kawasaki Heavy Industries by which these companies have had increasing involvement on successive Boeing jet programs, a process which has helped Boeing achieve almost total dominance of the Japanese market for commercial jets. Outsourcing was extended on the 787 to the extent that Boeing's own involvement was reduced to little more than project management, design, assembly, and test operation, outsourcing most of the actual manufacturing all around the world. Boeing has since stated that it "outsourced too much" and that future airplane projects will depend far more on its own engineering and production personnel.

Partly because of its origins as a consortium of European companies, Airbus has had fewer opportunities to outsource significant parts of its production beyond its own European plants. However, in 2009 Airbus opened an assembly plant in Tianjin, China for production of its A320 series airliners, and opened a similar assembly plant in Mobile, Alabama, United States in 2015.

=== Technology ===
Airbus sought to compete with the well-established Boeing in the 1970s through its introduction of advanced technology. For example, the A300 made the most extensive use of composite materials yet seen in an aircraft of that era, and by automating the flight engineer's functions, was the first widebody jet to have a two-person flight crew. In the 1980s Airbus was the first to introduce digital fly-by-wire controls into an airliner (the A320).

With Airbus now an established competitor to Boeing, both companies use advanced technology to seek performance advantages in their products. Many of these improvements are about weight reduction and fuel efficiency. For example, the Boeing 787 Dreamliner is the first large airliner to use 50% composites for its construction. The Airbus A350 XWB features 53% composites.

=== Engine choices ===
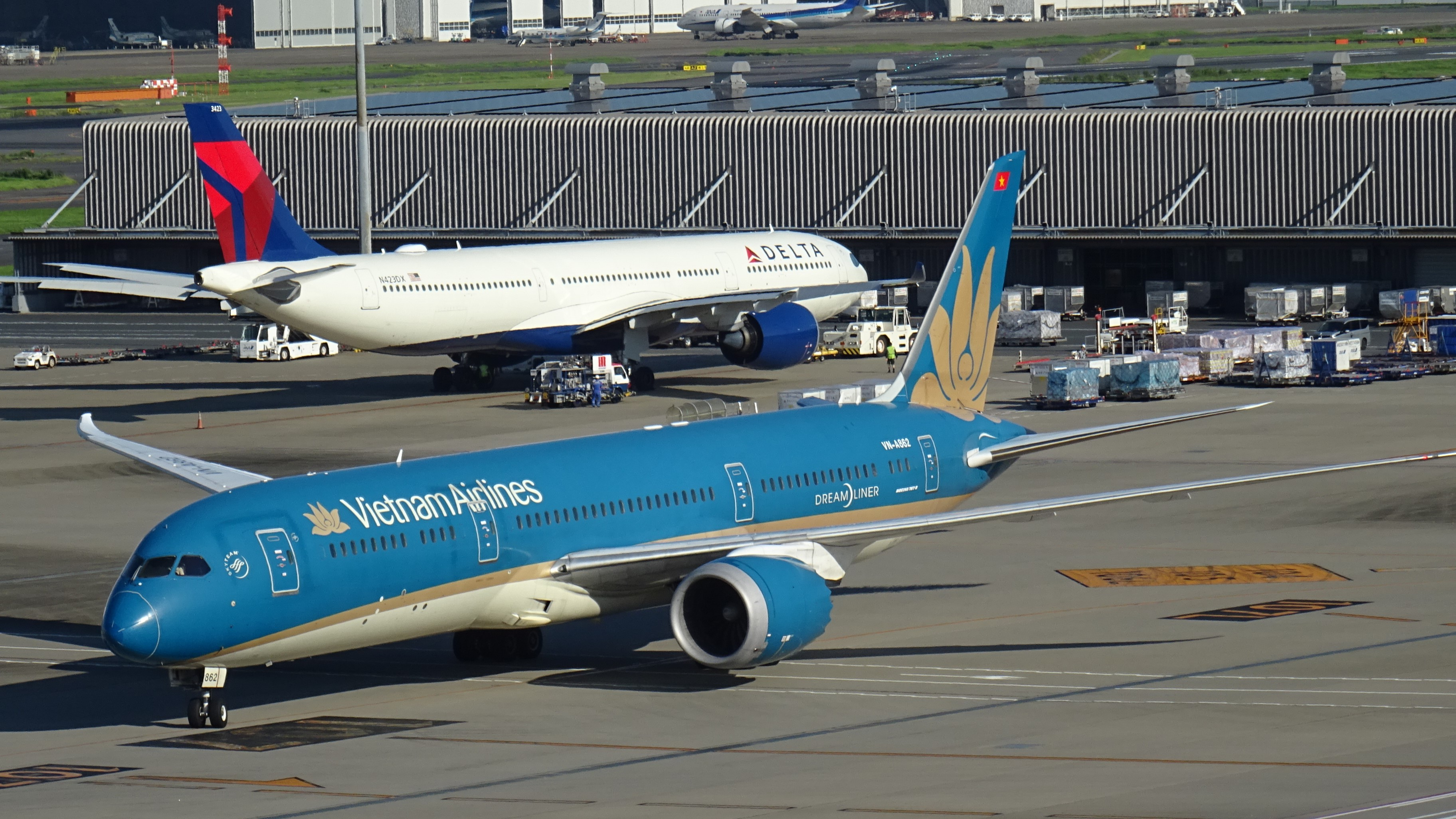
A General Electric-powered Boeing 787 Dreamliner with a Rolls Royce-powered Airbus A330neo in the background.

The competitive strength in the market of any airliner is considerably influenced by the choice of engine available. In general, airlines prefer to have a choice of at least two engines from the major manufacturers General Electric, Rolls-Royce and Pratt & Whitney. However, engine manufacturers prefer to be a single source and often succeed in striking commercial deals with Boeing and Airbus to achieve this.

In 2008, the competition was developing between two sides as Airbus selected the Rolls-Royce Trent XWB alone for the Airbus A350, while GE avoided a $1 billion development competing with its Boeing 777HGW exclusive GE90. In 2013, Boeing rejected a Rolls-Royce engine for the 777X to favor General Electric's GE9X. In 2014, Rolls-Royce secured its exclusivity to power the A330neo with the Trent 7000.

Other aircraft providing a single engine-type offering include the Boeing 737 MAX (CFM LEAP) or the Airbus A220 (P&W GTF); while those with multiple sources include the Boeing 787 (GEnx/Trent 1000) or the Airbus A320neo (P&W GTF/CFM LEAP).

=== Currency and exchange rates ===
Boeing's production costs are mostly in United States dollars, whereas Airbus's production costs are mostly in euro. When the dollar appreciates against the euro the cost of producing a Boeing aircraft rises relatively to the cost of producing an Airbus aircraft, and conversely when the dollar falls relative to the euro it is an advantage for Boeing. There are also possible currency risks and benefits involved in the way aircraft are sold. Boeing typically prices its aircraft only in dollars, while Airbus, although pricing most aircraft sales in dollars, has been known to be more flexible and has priced some aircraft sales in Asia and the Middle East in multiple currencies. Depending on currency fluctuations between the acceptance of the order and the delivery of the aircraft this can result in an extra profit or extra expense—or, if Airbus has purchased insurance against such fluctuations, an additional cost regardless.

=== Safety and quality ===
Most aircraft dominating the companies' current sales, the Boeing 737-NG and Airbus A320 families and both companies' wide-body offerings, have good safety records. Older model aircraft such as the Boeing 707, Boeing 727, Boeing 737-100/-200, Boeing 747-100/SP/200/300, Airbus A300, and Airbus A310, which were first flown during the 1960s, 1970s, and 1980s, have had higher rates of fatal accidents. Both companies tend to avoid safety comparisons when selling their aircraft to airlines or comparisons on product quality. According to Airbus's John Leahy in 2013, the Boeing 787 Dreamliner battery problems would not cause customers to switch airplane suppliers. The grounding of the Boeing 737 MAX following two high-profile crashes is also unlikely to significantly benefit Airbus at least short-term, as both the 737 MAX and A320neo production lines have backlogs of several years and changing manufacturers requires significant crew training.

=== Production planning ===
Former Airbus executive John Leahy indicated that Airbus has overbooked orders in its backlog, just as Boeing does, and uses internal algorithms to anticipate defections in order to maintain steady production.

== Effect of competition on product plans ==
As of December 2008, the A320 was selected by 222 operators, including several low-cost operators, gaining ground against the previously well established 737 in this sector; it has also been selected as a replacement for 727s and aging 737s by many full-service airlines such as Star Alliance members United Airlines, Air Canada, and Lufthansa. After dominating the very large aircraft market for four decades, the Boeing 747 faced a challenge from the A380. In response, Boeing offered the stretched and updated 747-8, with greater capacity, fuel efficiency, and range. Frequent delays to the Airbus A380 program caused several customers to consider cancelling their orders in favour of the refreshed 747-8. In February 2019 Airbus announced the end of the A380 production after the remaining orders would be delivered. By June 2019, 154 Boeing 747-8 were ordered and 134 delivered, while 290 Airbus A380 were ordered and 238 delivered.

Boeing pursued and then cancelled several projects, including the Sonic Cruiser. Boeing's current platform for fleet rejuvenation is the Boeing 787 Dreamliner, which uses technology from the Sonic Cruiser concept.

Boeing initially ruled out producing a re-engined version of its 737 to compete with the Airbus A320neo family launch planned for 2015, believing airlines would be looking towards the Boeing Y1 and a 30% fuel saving, instead of paying 10% more for fuel-efficiency gains of only a few percents. Industry sources believe that the 737's design makes re-engining considerably more expensive for Boeing than it was for the Airbus A320. However, there was considerable demand. Southwest Airlines, which uses the 737 for its entire fleet (680 in service or on order), said it was not prepared to wait 20 years or more for a new 737 model and threatened to convert to Airbus. Boeing eventually bowed to airline pressure and in 2011 approved the 737 MAX project, scheduled for first delivery in 2017.

== Orders and deliveries ==
Annual net orders and aircraft deliveries by Airbus and Boeing Commercial Airplanes, respectively, since 1989. View source data.

It took Boeing 42 years and 1 month to deliver its 10,000th 7series aircraft (October 1958 – November 2000), and 42 years and 5 months for Airbus to achieve the same milestone (May 1974 – October 2016). Boeing deliveries considerably exceeded that of Airbus throughout the 1980s. In the 1990s, this lead narrowed significantly but Boeing remained ahead of Airbus. In the 2000s, Airbus assumed the lead in narrow-body aircraft. By 2010, little difference remained between Airbus and Boeing in both the wide-body or narrow-body categories or the range on offer.

Except for the years 2012 and 2018, Airbus orders have significantly outpaced Boeing's, to the extent that the European rival will soon surpass all commercial Boeing orders from the inception of the company, despite having a much shorter history. By July 2021, Airbus had a 62% share of the airliner backlog compared to 38% for Boeing. This roughly 60/40 split of the existing backlog, is still the case when analysing the latest Orders & Deliveries statistics from the companies (valid per Nov 2024).

=== Orders and deliveries by year ===
The significant orders in a year were +2,094 Airbus aircraft in 2023 and respectively −1026 Boeing aircraft in 2020, while the significant deliveries in a year were 863 Airbus aircraft in 2019 and 4 aircraft in 1974 respectively.

Figures in blue indicate the year leader for deliveries. Figures in green indicate the year leader for orders. Figures in red indicate negative net orders.
Boeing											Year	Airbus									
Deliveries per model									Deliveries	Orders	Year	Orders	Deliveries	Deliveries per model							
707	717	727	737	747	757	767	777	787	Deliveries	Orders	Year	Orders	Deliveries	A220	A300	A310	A320	A330	A340	A350	A380
21		91	55	22					189	181	1974	20	4		4						
7		91	51	21					170	117	1975	16	8		8						
9		61	41	27					138	170	1976	1	13		13						
8		67	25	20					120	228	1977	16	15		15						
13		118	40	32					203	485	1978	73	15		15						
6		136	77	67					286	321	1979	127	26		26						
3		131	92	73					299	374	1980	47	39		39						
2		94	108	53					257	223	1981	54	38		38						
8		26	95	26	2	20			177	110	1982	17	46		46						
8		11	82	22	25	55			203	155	1983	7	36		19	17					
8		8	67	16	18	29			146	182	1984	35	48		19	29					
3			115	24	36	25			203	412	1985	92	42		16	26					
4			141	35	35	27			242	346	1986	170	29		10	19					
9			161	23	40	37			270	366	1987	114	32		11	21					
0			165	24	48	53			290	657	1988	167	61		17	28	16				
5			146	45	51	37			284	563	1989	421	105		24	23	58				
4			174	70	77	60			385	456	1990	404	95		19	18	58				
14			215	64	80	62			435	240	1991	101	163		25	19	119				
5			218	61	99	63			446	230	1992	136	157		22	24	111				
0			152	56	71	51			330	220	1993	38	138		22	22	71	1	22		
1			121	40	69	41			272	112	1994	125	123		23	2	64	9	25		
			89	25	43	37	13		207	379	1995	106	124		17	2	56	30	19		
			76	26	42	43	32		219	664	1996	326	126		14	2	72	10	28		
			135	39	46	42	59		321	532	1997	460	182		6	2	127	14	33		
			282	53	54	47	74		510	606	1998	556	229		13	1	168	23	24		
	12		320	47	67	44	83		573	355	1999	476	294		8		222	44	20		
	32		282	25	45	44	55		483	588	2000	520	311		8		241	43	19		
	49		299	31	45	40	61		525	314	2001	375	325		11		257	35	22		
	20		223	27	29	35	47		381	251	2002	300	303		9		236	42	16		
	12		173	19	14	24	39		281	239	2003	284	305		8		233	31	33		
	12		202	15	11	9	36		285	272	2004	370	320		12		233	47	28		
	13		212	13	2	10	40		290	1,002	2005	1,055	378		9		289	56	24		
	5		302	14		12	65		398	1,044	2006	790	434		9		339	62	24		
			330	16		12	83		441	1,413	2007	1,341	453		6		367	68	11		1
			290	14		10	61		375	662	2008	777	483				386	72	13		12
			372	8		13	88		481	142	2009	281	498				402	76	10		10
			376	0		12	74		462	530	2010	574	510				401	87	4		18
			372	9		20	73	3	477	805	2011	1,419	534				421	87	0		26
			415	31		26	83	46	601	1,203	2012	833	588				455	101	2		30
			440	24		21	98	65	648	1,355	2013	1,503	626				493	108			25
			485	19		6	99	114	723	1,432	2014	1,456	629				490	108		1	30
			495	18		16	98	135	762	768	2015	1,080	635				491	103		14	27
			490	9		13	99	137	748	668	2016	731	688	7			545	66		49	28
			529	14		10	74	136	763	912	2017	1,109	718	17			558	67		78	15
			580	6		27	48	145	806	893	2018	747	800	33			626	49		93	12
			127	7		43	45	158	380	(87)	2019	768	863	48			642	53		112	8
			43	5		30	26	53	157	(1,026)	2020	268	566	38			446	19		59	4
			263	7		32	24	14	340	479	2021	507	611	50			483	18		55	5
			387	5		33	24	31	480	774	2022	820	661	53			516	32		60	
			396	1		32	26	73	528	1,314	2023	2,094	735	68			571	32		64	
			265			18	14	51	348	317	2024	826	766	75			602	32		57	
			447			30	35	88	600	1,173	2025	889	793	93			607	36		57	
			400			29	21	73	524	783	2026	1,305	621	77			483	17		44	
1,010	155	1,831	12,772	1,573	1,049	1,380	1,798	1,322	22,890	29,347	Totals	26,815	17,379	559	561	255	12,955	1,678	377	743	251
—	—	—	4,654	—	—	71	600	1,132	6,457	October	Backlog	October	9,436	546	—	—	7,643	362	—	885	—

The former McDonnell Douglas MD-80, the MD-90 and the MD-11 are included in Boeing deliveries since MD's August 1997 merger with Boeing.

As of January 2024, the manufactures plan to increase the production of their models: (Note: Figures regarding Boeing by 2025/26, A220 and A350 by 2025, A320neo family by 2026 and A330 by 2024)

- Airbus A220 to 168 per year
- Airbus A320neo family to 900 per year and Boeing 737MAX to 600 per year
- Airbus A330 to 48 per year and Boeing 777 to 48 per year
- Airbus A350 to 108 per year and Boeing 787 to 120 per year

=== Backlog over time ===
This table shows the backlog (regarding past years on 31 December):

	2025	2024	2023	2022	2021	2020	2019	2018	2017	2016	2015				
Airbus	8,754	8,658	8,598	7,239	7,082	7,184	7,482	7,577	7,260	6,874	6,787				
Boeing	6,130	5,595	5,626	4,578	4,250	4,223	5,625	5,951	5,856	5,715	5,896				
Difference	2,624	3,063	2,972	2,661	2,832	2,961	1,857	1,626	1,404	1,159	891				
	2014	2013	2012	2011	2010	2009	2008	2007	2006	2005	2004	2003	2002	2001	2000
Airbus	6,386	5,559	4,682	4,437	3,552	3,488	3,705	3,421	2,533	2,177	1,500	1,454	1,505	1,575	1,626
Boeing	5,789	5,080	4,373	3,771	3,443	3,375	3,714	3,427	2,455	1,809	1,097	1,110	1,152	1,363	1,612
Difference	597	479	309	666	109	113	9	6	78	368	403	344	353	212	14

Figures in blue indicate a lead for Airbus. Figures in red indicate a lead for Boeing.

=== Airliners in service ===
World Airline Census
Year/Aircraft	707	717	727	737	747	757	767	777	787	Boeing	A220	A300	A310	A320	A330	A340	A350	A380	Airbus	Ratio	Total
2006	68	155	620	4,328	989	996	862	575		8,593		408	199	2,761	418	306			4,092	2.09:1	12,685
2007	63	155	561	4,583	985	1,000	880	640		8,867		392	193	3,095	481	330			4,491	1.97:1	13,358
2008	61	154	500	4,761	955	980	873	714		8,998		387	194	3,395	533	330		4	4,843	1.86:1	13,841
2009	58	142	442	4,928	947	970	864	780		9,131		376	188	3,737	607	345		16	5,269	1.73:1	14,400
2010	39	147	398	5,153	915	945	863	858		9,318		348	160	4,092	675	342		30	5,647	1.65:1	14,965
2011	10	130	250	5,177	736	898	837	924		8,962		296	121	4,392	766	332		50	5,957	1.50:1	14,919
2012	2	143	169	5,357	690	860	838	1,017	15	9,091		262	102	4,803	848	312		76	6,403	1.42:1	15,494
2013		148	109	5,458	627	855	821	1,094	68	9,180		234	84	5,170	927	298		106	6,819	1.35:1	15,999
2014		154	87	5,782	585	812	795	1,188	163	9,564		216	71	5,632	1,020	266		136	7,341	1.30:1	16,905
2015		136	69	6,135	571	738	765	1,265	286	9,965		207	62	6,050	1,095	227	5	167	7,813	1.28:1	17,778
2016		154	64	6,512	515	688	742	1,324	423	10,422		210	47	6,510	1,154	196	29	193	8,339	1.25:1	18,761
2017		154	57	6,864	489	689	744	1,387	554	10,938		211	37	6,965	1,214	176	92	212	8,907	1.23:1	19,845
2018		148	44	7,310	462	666	742	1,416	675	11,463	39	212	31	7,506	1,265	159	185	223	9,620	1.19:1	21,083
2019		145	40	7,132	461	655	729	1,424	808	11,394	77	202	25	7,913	1,270	135	282	233	10,137	1.12:1	21,531
2020		91	34	5,743	327	479	544	1,041	728	8,987	105	185	14	6,269	755	59	293	18	7,698	1.17:1	16,685
2023		105	36	6,500	441	582	269	1,163	1,113	10,208	314	219	52	10,562	1,469	202	585	233	13,636	1:1.34	23,844
2024		tbc	tbc	tbc	tbc	tbc	tbc	tbc	tbc	TBC	389	212	48	10,947	1,473	193	641	223	14,126	tbc	tbc
2025		tbc	tbc	tbc	tbc	tbc	tbc	tbc	tbc	TBC	478	209	47	11,481	1,474	180	698	215	14,782	tbc	tbc
	707	717	727	737	747	757	767	777	787	Total	A220	A300	A310	A320	A330	A340	A350	A380	Total		

== Controversies ==
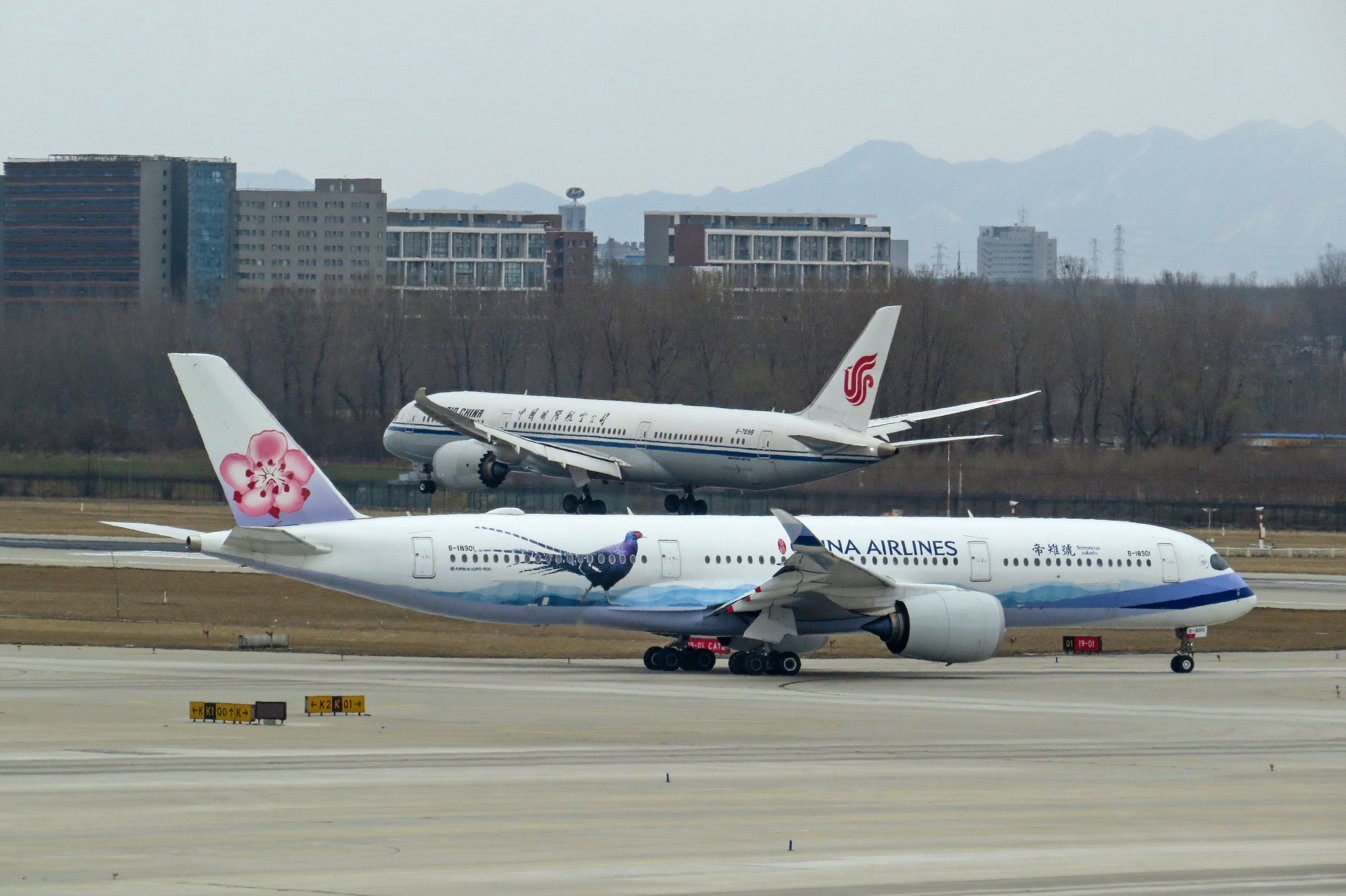
The Boeing 787 Dreamliner (Air China) competes with the Airbus A350 (China Airlines) and Airbus A330neo.

=== Subsidies ===
Boeing has continually protested over launch aid in the form of credits to Airbus, while Airbus has argued that Boeing receives illegal subsidies through military and research contracts and tax breaks.

In July 2004, Harry Stonecipher (then CEO of Boeing) accused Airbus of abusing a 1992 bilateral EU-US agreement regarding large civil aircraft support from governments. Airbus is given reimbursable launch investment (RLI, called "launch aid" by the US) from European governments with the money being paid back with interest, plus indefinite royalties if the aircraft is a commercial success. Airbus contends that this system is fully compliant with the 1992 agreement and WTO rules. The agreement allows up to 33 percent of the program cost to be met through government loans which are to be fully repaid within 17 years with interest and royalties. These loans are held at a minimum interest rate equal to the cost of government borrowing plus 0.25%, which would be below market rates available to Airbus without government support. Airbus claims that since the signing of the EU-US agreement in 1992, it has repaid European governments more than US$6.7 billion and that this is 40% more than it has received.

Airbus argues that pork barrel military contracts awarded to Boeing (the second largest US defense contractor) are in effect a form of subsidy (see the KC-X program). The US government support of technology development via NASA also provides support to Boeing. In its recent products such as the 787, Boeing has also received support from local and state governments. Airbus's parent, EADS, is itself a military contractor, paid to develop and build projects such as the Airbus A400M transport and various other military aircraft.

In January 2005, European Union and United States trade representatives Peter Mandelson and Robert Zoellick agreed to talks aimed at resolving increasing tensions. The talks were unsuccessful; the parties did not reach a settlement and the dispute became more acrimonious.

=== World Trade Organization litigation ===
We remain united in our determination that this dispute shall not affect our cooperation on wider bilateral and multilateral trade issues. We have worked together well so far, and intend to continue to do so.

— Joint EU-US statement

On 31 May 2005, the United States filed a case against the European Union for providing allegedly illegal subsidies to Airbus. Twenty-four hours later, the European Union filed a complaint against the United States, protesting support for Boeing.

Increased tensions, due to support for the Airbus A380, escalated toward a potential trade war as the launch of the Airbus A350 neared. Airbus preferred launching the A350 program with the help of state loans covering a third of the development costs, although stated that it would launch without these loans if required. The A350 competes with Boeing's most successful project in recent years, the 787 Dreamliner. EU trade officials questioned the nature of the funding provided by NASA, the Department of Defense, and in particular the form of R&D contracts that benefit Boeing; as well as funding from US states such as Washington, Kansas, and Illinois, for the development and launch of Boeing aircraft, in particular, the 787. An interim report of the WTO investigation into the claims made by both sides was made in September 2009.

In March 2010, the WTO ruled that European governments unfairly financed Airbus. In September 2010, a preliminary report of the WTO found unfair Boeing payments broke WTO rules and should be withdrawn. In two separate findings issued in May 2011, the WTO found, firstly, that the US defence budget and NASA research grants could not be used as vehicles to subsidise the civilian aerospace industry and that Boeing must repay $5.3 billion of illegal subsidies. Secondly, the WTO Appellate Body partly overturned an earlier ruling that European Government launch aid constituted unfair subsidy, agreeing with the point of principle that the support was not aimed at boosting exports and some forms of public-private partnership could continue. Part of the $18bn in low interest loans received would have to be repaid eventually; however, there was no immediate need for it to be repaid and the exact value to be repaid would be set at a future date. Both parties claimed victory in what was the world's largest trade dispute.

On 1 December 2011, Airbus reported that it had fulfilled its obligations under the WTO findings and called upon Boeing to do likewise in the coming year. The United States did not agree and had already begun complaint procedures prior to December, stating the EU had failed to comply with the DSB's recommendations and rulings, and requesting authorisation by the DSB to take countermeasures under Article 22 of the DSU and Article 7.9 of the SCM Agreement. The European Union requested the matter be referred to arbitration under Article 22.6 of the DSU. The DSB agreed that the matter raised by the European Union in its statement at that meeting be referred to arbitration as required by Article 22.6 of the DSU however on 19 January 2012 the US and EU jointly agreed to withdraw their request for arbitration.

On 12 March 2012, the appellate body of the WTO released its findings confirming the illegality of subsidies to Boeing whilst confirming the legality of repayable loans made to Airbus. The WTO stated that Boeing had received at least $5.3 billion in illegal cash subsidies at an estimated cost to Airbus of $45 billion. A further $2 billion in state and local subsidies that Boeing is set to receive have also been declared illegal. Boeing and the US government were given six months to change the way government support for Boeing is handled. At the DSB meeting on 13 April 2012, the United States informed the DSB that it intended to implement the DSB recommendations and rulings in a manner that respects its WTO obligations and within the time-frame established in Article 7.9 of the SCM Agreement. The European Union welcomed the US intention and noted that the 6-month period stipulated in Article 7.9 of the SCM Agreement would expire on 23 September 2012. On 24 April 2012, the European Union and the United States informed the DSB of Agreed Procedures under Articles 21 and 22 of the DSU and Article 7 of the SCM Agreement.

On 25 September 2012, the EU requested discussions with the US, because of the alleged non-compliance of the US and Boeing with the WTO ruling of 12 March 2012. On 27 September 2012, the EU requested the WTO to approve EU countermeasures against the USA's subsidy of Boeing. The WTO approved the creation of a panel to rule on the dispute; this ruling was originally scheduled for 2014 but, because of the complexity of the case, was deferred to be decided not before 2016. The EU wanted permission to place trade sanctions of up to 12 billion US$ annually against the USA. The EU believed this amount represents the damage the illegal subsidies of Boeing cause to the EU.

On 19 December 2014, the EU requested WTO mediated consultations with the US over the tax incentives given by the state of Washington to large civil aircraft manufacturers which they believed violated the earlier WTO ruling, on 22 April 2015 at the request of the EU a WTO panel was set up to rule on the complaint. The tax incentives given by the state of Washington and believed to be the largest in US history surpassing the previous record of $5.6bn over 30 years awarded by the state of New York to the aluminum producer Alcoa in 2007. The $8.7bn over 40 years incentive to Boeing to manufacture the 777X in the state includes $4.2bn from a 40% reduction in business taxes, £3.5bn in tax credits for the firm, a $562m tax credit on property and buildings belonging to Boeing, a $242m sales tax exemption for buying computers and $8m to train 1000 workers, Airbus alleges this is larger than the budgeted cost of Boeing's 777X development program and the EU argues amounts to an entire publicly funded free aircraft program for Boeing, the legislation was an extension of the duration of a tax break program given to Boeing for Dreamliner development that had already been ruled illegal by the WTO in 2012. Boeing defends the allegation by arguing the subsidies are available to anyone however for an aircraft to qualify for the tax breaks a company must manufacture aircraft wings and perform all final assembly for an aircraft model or variant exclusively in the state.

In September 2016, the WTO found that Airbus did not remedy the harm to Boeing from illegal subsidies, and the EU immediately appealed for a final decision in late spring 2018. Boeing expected the 2016 decision would largely be upheld with sanctions of $10 to $15 billion, possibly levied by punitive US government tariffs, but that the EU would retaliate strongly. The EU case against Boeing filed as a countersuit lags the US case and the decision on Boeing's appeal will not come out until late in 2018 or even in 2019. Both are exposed with a backlog of 644 Boeing orders in the EU and 1,340 Airbus orders in the US, but this is mitigated as many are from lessors, to be delivered elsewhere, and as Airbus has an assembly line in Alabama.

On 15 May 2018, in its EU appeal ruling, the WTO concluded that the A380 and A350 received improper subsidies through repayable launch aids or low interest rates, like previous airliners, which could have been avoided. Boeing claimed victory but Airbus countered it is thin with 94% of the complaints rejected, as launch aids are legal but at market interest rates, not lower: violations will be corrected. US tariffs, probably on other industries, may take up to 18 months to get WTO approval, but EU could retaliate over Washington State 787 subsidies and tax breaks for the 777X. The US will pursue penalties if an agreement cannot be reached but is willing to reach a settlement with the European Union.

=== Tariffs ===
On 9 April 2019, the US Government announced that it would pursue penalties by placing tariffs on Airbus and other European Union goods over Airbus' improper subsidies, in an apparent act of retaliation. In response, Bruno Le Maire, France's financial minister, said that a "friendly" solution should be made. On 1 July, the US Government proposed more tariffs for the same reason.

On 24 September the same year, it was announced that the WTO would authorize the US to place the tariffs. The WTO stated that the $8 billion USD of EU goods could be affected by the tariffs.

The WTO announced the allowed level of punitive tariffs on 30 September, around $5-10 billion down from the $25 billion asked for, then the USTR should issue a list of products to be taxed from year-end. By mid-2020, the WTO is slated to determine the allowed EU punitive tariffs, as the EU claims $20 billion in damages. It would damage both sides, with Boeing having the most to lose as US Aerospace and defense exports to Europe totals $30.5 billion, while imports are $23.6 billion.

On 2 October 2019, the WTO approved US tariffs on $7.5 billion worth of European goods, and officially authorized them on 14 October, despite the European Union urging for a negotiated settlement. After midnight on 18 October, the US tariffs went into effect. The tariffs target Airbus, wine, and other European goods.

On 15 February 2020, the US government announced that it would increase tariffs on Airbus aircraft from 10% to 15%. Airbus expressed regret at the statement. The increased tariffs went into effect on 17 February. In an attempt to reduce the threat of retaliatory tariffs by the European Union on exports from Washington state, Boeing requested on 19 February that the Washington State Legislature suspend its preferential business-and-occupation tax rate, which saves Boeing around $100 million annually. The WTO ruled in March of the previous year that the tax breaks for Boeing by the state of Washington constituted illegal US subsidies, but determined that, except for the tax break which Boeing requested suspension of, the European Union had no grounds to seek damages.

On 30 September 2020, the WTO approved the European Union's retaliatory tariffs on $4.1 billion worth of US goods, this is in addition to the previous unimplemented sanction allowing the EU the right to impose tariffs of up to $8.2 billion on US goods and services. On 11 October, acting European Commissioner for Trade Valdis Dombrovskis urged the US to withdraw its tariffs, reiterating retaliatory action. Two days later, on 13 October, the WTO authorized the EU's tariffs. The next day, on 14 October, the US finally offered to remove their tariffs if Airbus would refinance the state loans at a level of interest that assumed a 50% product failure rate. The EU criticized the deal as "unacceptable" due to its cost estimated to be around $10 billion along with the impact of the COVID-19 pandemic on the aviation industry. The US argued that European tariffs on US goods were unnecessary as the local tax subsidies for Boeing had ended while Airbus countered that the US was still applying import tariffs even though the A380 was no longer in production. Further talks with the WTO regarding the tariffs are scheduled for 26 October, however, the tariffs may only go into effect depending on the results on the 2020 United States presidential election. On 9 November the WTO announced that the EU's tariffs would still go into effect, though the EU indicated it was hopeful a settlement could be reached with the new US administration in 2021. On 13 November Bruno Le Maire said a settlement could potentially be reached in several weeks. Both sides resumed negotiations on 2 December. In an attempt to reduce tensions, the United Kingdom dropped its own tariffs on US goods on 8 December.

On 30 December 2020, the US government announced that it would widen its current tariffs on EU goods, it said it was unfair that the duties for the EU sanctions upon the US were calculated during the COVID-19 outbreak when US exports were smaller than usual increasing the number of US goods to which tariffs needed to be applied to reach the WTO's approved sanction value. The widening took effect on 12 January 2021.

On 4 March 2021, the US government suspended its tariffs on UK goods as part of resolving the dispute. The next day, on 5 March, the US and EU both suspended their tariffs on their respective goods for the same reason. On 22 March, US trade representative Katherine Tai held a meeting with EU trade commissioner Valdis Dombrovskis and UK trade secretary Liz Truss to begin negotiations to end the dispute.

On 15 June 2021, the US and EU reached a truce, suspending the tariffs for five years. The two sides agreed that future research and development funding would be given out transparently and without advantaging domestic producers.

== See also ==
- Airbus Corporate Jets
- Boeing Commercial Airplanes
- Boeing manufacturing and design issues
- Competition in the Regional jet market
- List of civil aircraft

== Sources ==
- Newhouse, John (2007), Boeing versus Airbus, USA: Vintage Books, ISBN 978-1-4000-7872-1
