= Raymond Conner =

American businessman (born 1954/1955)

- Born: 1954 or 1955 (age 71–72)
- Education: BS, Central Wash. Univ.; MBA, Univ. of Puget Sound
- Occupation: Business executive
- Years active: 1977–present
- Employer: The Boeing Company
- Title: Vice Chairman (retired)
- Term: 2013–2017
- Board member of: Adient; Alaska Air Group; Boys & Girls Clubs of Bellevue
- Title: President and CEO, Boeing Commercial Airplanes
- Term: 2012–2016
- Predecessor: James Albaugh
- Successor: Kevin G. McAllister

Raymond L. Conner (born 1954 or 1955) is a retired American businessman formerly serving as vice chairman of the Boeing Company and president and chief executive officer of Boeing Commercial Airplanes.

== Early life and education ==
Conner grew up in Burien, Washington and went to Highline High School. In 2014, Conner was recognized with the "Outstanding Alumnus" award by the Highline Schools Foundation.

Conner received a Bachelor of Science degree from Central Washington University in 1979, followed by a Master of Business Administration from the University of Puget Sound.

== The Boeing Company (1977–2017) ==
Most recently, Conner served as vice chairman of the Boeing Company and a member of the Boeing Executive Council, from 2013 until he retired at the end of 2017.

Conner was also president and chief executive officer of Boeing Commercial Airplanes beginning in June 2012. Conner stepped down in November 2016 and was replaced by Kevin G. McAllister.

Conner was previously the head of sales, marketing, and commercial aviation services for Boeing Commercial Airplanes and vice president and general manager of Supply Chain Management for the Boeing Company.

From February 2003 to December 2007, he was Boeing's vice president of sales for the Americas. From June 2001 to February 2003, he was vice president and general manager of the 777 program. Before leading the 777 program, he led Boeing's sales team for Asia/Pacific, including oversight of Boeing's offices in China, Japan, and Korea.

Other positions Conner has held include vice president of Boeing's Propulsion Systems Division, director of Finance and Information Systems for the Materiel Division of Boeing Commercial Airplanes, deputy director of Major Outside Production and Program Participants, and of International Business Operations, both in the Materiel Division.

Conner joined the company in 1977 as a mechanic on the 727 program.

== Boards of directors ==
Conner is a member of the boards of directors of Adient (since October 31, 2016) and Alaska Air Group (since 2018).

He was previously a board member of Johnson Controls until the company's automotive seating and interiors businesses were spun-off in 2016 to form Adient, at which point Conner became a board member for Adient.

He is a member of the board of directors for the Boys & Girls Clubs of Bellevue.

Business positions
| Preceded by James Albaugh | President/CEO of Boeing Commercial Airplanes; 2012–2016 | Succeeded by Kevin G. McAllister |
