= Kevin G. McAllister =

American businessman

- Education: BS, University of Pittsburgh
- Occupation: Business executive
- Employer: AE Industrial Partners
- Title: Senior Operating Partner
- Term: 2020–present
- Employer: The Boeing Company
- Title: President and CEO, Boeing Commercial Airplanes
- Term: 2016–2019
- Predecessor: Raymond Conner
- Successor: Stanley A. Deal
- Employer: General Electric
- Title: President and CEO, GE Aviation, Services
- Term: 2014–2016

Kevin G. McAllister is an American businessman, serving as a senior operating officer of AE Industrial Partners LLC since June 2020. He previously served as president and CEO of Boeing Commercial Airplanes (2016–2019) and president and CEO of GE Aviation (2014–2016).

== Education ==
McAllister received a bachelor's degree from University of Pittsburgh in materials engineering.

== Career ==
McAllister joined GE Aviation in 1989 and held various positions in materials engineering and sales. Before departing for Boeing, McAllister held the role of chief executive officer and president of GE Aviation Services.

In November 2016, McAllister was named as president and CEO of Boeing Commercial Airplanes, taking the role previously held by Raymond Conner. In October 2019, McAllister was ousted from his position as CEO of Boeing Commercial Airplanes amid controversy surrounding the Boeing 737 MAX groundings.

In June 2020, McAllister joined AE Industrial Partners as a senior operating partner.

Business positions
Preceded by Raymond Conner	President/CEO of Boeing Commercial Airplanes; 2016–2019	Succeeded by Stanley A. Deal
