= Boeing Capital =

Aircraft leasing company

- Type: Subsidiary
- Industry: Aerospace
- Founded: 1968; 58 years ago
- Headquarters: Renton, Washington
- Parent: Boeing Commercial Airplanes

Boeing Capital is a subsidiary of Boeing Commercial Airplanes, providing aircraft leasing and lending services. Boeing Capital is made up of two divisions, Aircraft Financial Services and Space & Defense Financial Services. It operates as a support unit for Boeing's main businesses.

== History ==
Boeing Capital was incorporated in 1968 as McDonnell Douglas Finance, but this name was changed to Boeing Capital in 1997, when Boeing merged with the McDonnell Douglas Corporation.

The subsidiary is known as a worldwide provider of financial services, but primarily supports its parent corporation.

In September 2018, Boeing, Boeing Capital and insurance firm Marsh & McLennan were sued for having stolen Xavian Insurance's actuarial analysis to create the Aircraft Finance Insurance Consortium (better known as AFIC) to replace financing from the US-Exim Bank, which at that time could not take new business because Congress had refused to recharter it.
