= Boeing Model 64 =

Model 64
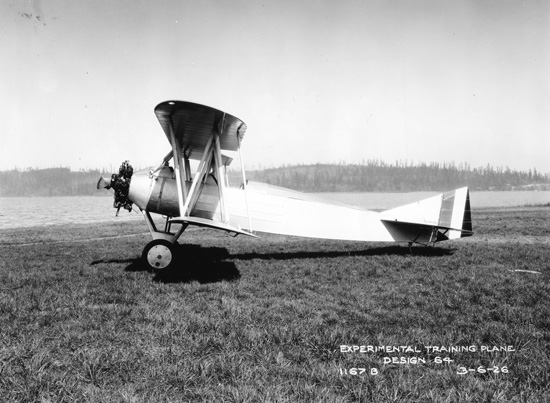

General information
- Type: Biplane trainer
- National origin: United States
- Manufacturer: Boeing
- Number built: 1 (possibly 2)

History
- First flight: February 1926

The Boeing Model 64 was an American single engine biplane training aircraft built by Boeing in the 1920s that failed to gain any orders.

== Development and design ==
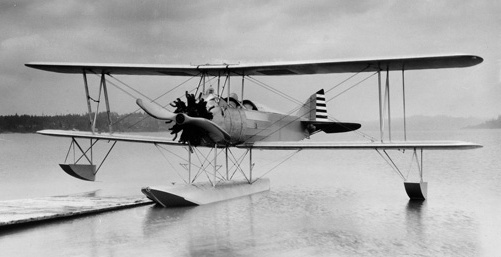
Boeing model 64 on floats - front

The Model 64 was built by Boeing at their own expense, and submitted to both the US Army and US Navy as a primary and gunnery training aircraft. The fuselage and tail was constructed of welded steel tubing, with wood wings spars and ribs. The wings used reverted to an earlier two bay design, due to aerodynamic problems with the Model 21/NB. For gunnery training a removable rear cockpit structure was built to carry a gun ring and flexible machine gun. A fixed synchronized gun could also be mounted to fire through the propeller.

The Model 64 first flew in February 1926. Later, the wings were replaced with ones using the thicker NACA Munk M-12 airfoil and which required only one set of struts. The updated plane first flew on 31 August 1926.

The aircraft was sold to Pacific Air Transport, later fitted with a Wright J-5 engine and resold to a private owner.

== Operators ==
United States

- Pacific Air Transport

== Specifications (seaplane) ==
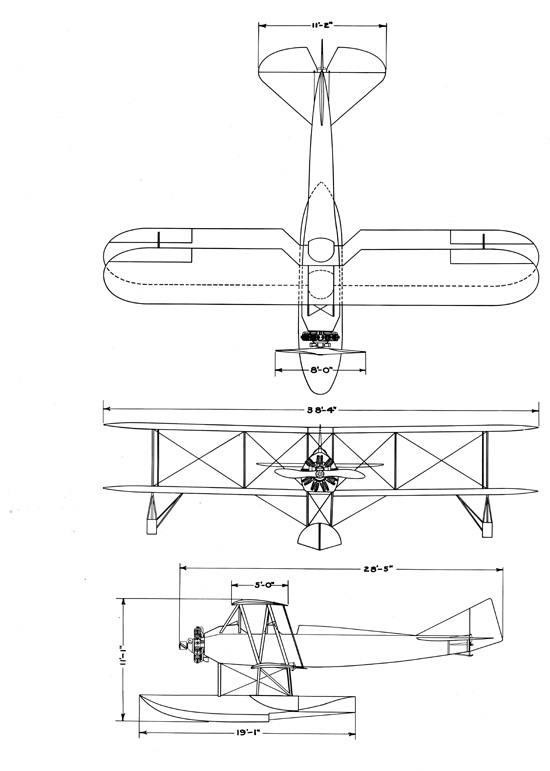
Boeing model 64 drawing

Data from Bowers, 1966, pg. 122

General characteristics

- Crew: 2
- Length: 28 ft 5 in (8.66 m)
- Wingspan: 58 ft 4 in (17.78 m)
- Height: 11 ft 1 in (3.38 m)
- Wing area: 344 sq ft (32.0 m^{2})
- Empty weight: 2,140 lb (971 kg)
- Gross weight: 2,840 lb (1,288 kg)
- Powerplant: 1 × Wright J-3 9-cylinder radial engine , 200 hp (150 kW)

Performance

- Maximum speed: 93.3 mph (150 km/h, 81.1 kn)
- Cruise speed: 84 mph (135 km/h, 73 kn)
- Range: 250 mi (400 km, 220 nmi)
- Service ceiling: 7,500 ft (2,286 m)
- Rate of climb: 410 ft/min (2.1 m/s)

Armament

- 1x 0.30 in (7.7 mm) calibre machine gun.
