= Tupolev Tu-404 =

Proposed Russian jumbojet

General information
- Type: Double decker airliner
- National origin: Russia
- Manufacturer: Tupolev
- Status: Proposal

The Tupolev Tu-404 was a wide-body superjumbo blended wing jet airliner proposed by Russian aerospace company Tupolev.

== Development ==
Work on the Tu-404 was initiated in 1991 in parallel with another widebody design, the Tupolev Tu-304. The Tu-404 was designed to transport more than 1,200 passengers to destinations 12,000 - 13,000 km away. The Tupolev Design Bureau investigated several possible configurations for the Tu-404, including a flying wing and a conventional design. The flying wing's powerplant would consist of six pusher turboprop engines developing 18,000 kg of thrust each during take-off and each consuming only 0.644 kg/kgf-h of fuel in cruise mode. The engines would have been located in the tail section of the flying wing fuselage between two large V-shaped vertical stabilizers. The central fuselage contains six passenger compartments accommodating 1214 passengers. The leading edge of the central fuselage has a sweep of 45 degrees. Two large removable wings containing fuel tanks have the leading-edge sweep of 35 degrees and are attached to the central fuselage. The wings hold most of the aircraft's fuel.

The conventional design featured a two-level passenger aircraft capable of transporting 1,200 people to destinations of up to 10,000 km. The lower level of the fuselage was designed as a multi-section cargo compartment for transporting cargo in standard aviation containers. Two sub-variants of this design were investigated, a mixed passenger-cargo aircraft with the enlarge cargo section and a dedicated cargo model. The massive low-level wing with a leading-edge sweep of 35 degrees and vertical wingtips has massive control surfaces: multi-section leading-edge control surfaces, low-speed control areas, multi-section flaps. Each half of the altitude control surface is made of two sections.

Proposed powerplants included four Kuznetsov NK-44 or Rolls-Royce "Trent" engines installed on underwing pylons. The aircraft's undercarriage consisted of several carts with multiple wheels in each cart. It is retracted into the central fuselage section of the aircraft.

The project did not proceed beyond the stage of marketing models.

== Specifications (flying wing) ==
Data from

General characteristics

- Capacity: 1214 passengers
- Length: 59.7 m (195 ft 10 in)
- Wingspan: 110 m (360 ft 11 in)
- Max takeoff weight: 605,000 kg (1,333,797 lb)

Performance

- Cruise speed: 900 km/h (560 mph, 490 kn)
- Range: 13,500 km (8,400 mi, 7,300 nmi)

== See also ==
- Airbus A380
- Antonov An-225
- Boeing 747-8
- Boeing New Large Airplane
- C-5 Galaxy
- McDonnell Douglas MD-12
- Sukhoi KR-860
