= Double-deck aircraft =

Aircraft with two passenger decks

The A380 double-deck cross-section

A double-deck aircraft has two decks for passengers; the second deck may be only a partial deck, and may be above or below the main deck. Most commercial aircraft have one passenger deck and one cargo deck for luggage and ULD containers, but a few have two decks for passengers, typically above or below a third deck for cargo.

== History ==
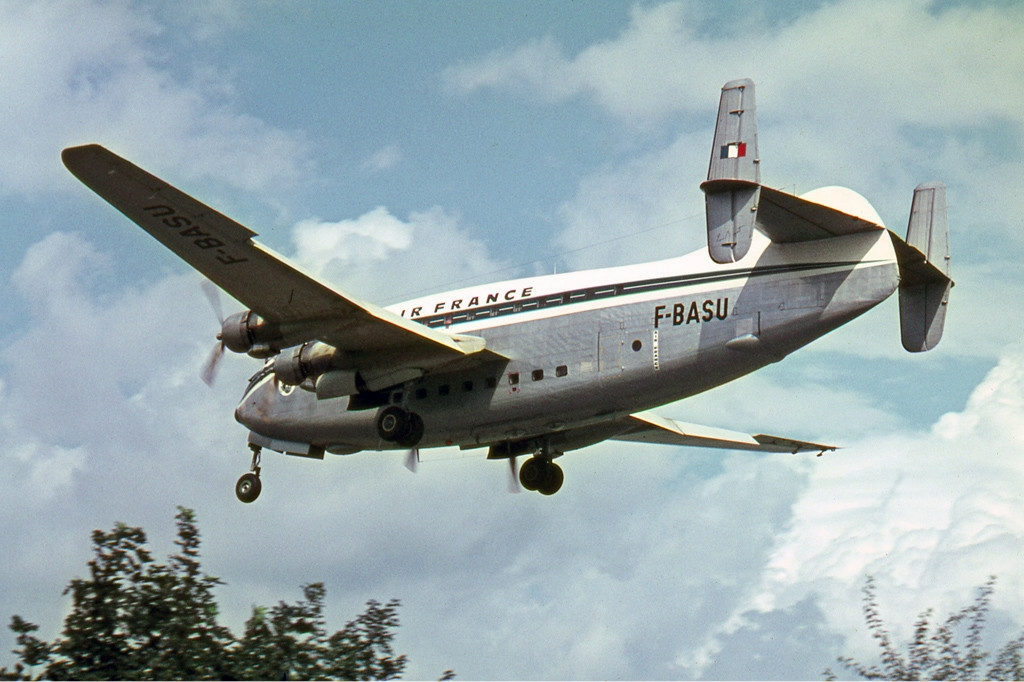
Breguet Deux-Ponts, the first full double-deck aircraft

Many early flying boat airliners, such as the Boeing 314 Clipper and Short Sandringham, had two decks. Following World War II, the Stratocruiser, a partially double-decked derivative of the B-29 Superfortress, became popular with airlines around the world.

The first full double-deck aircraft was the French Breguet Deux-Ponts, in service from 1953. The first partial double-deck jet airliner was the widebody Boeing 747, in service from 1970, with the top deck smaller than the main deck. Relocating the cockpit to the 747's distinctive bubble-top upper deck permitted nose doors with unobstructed access to the full length of the hold. Most 747s are passenger jets, and a small percentage are cargo jets with nose doors.

The first full double-deck jet airliner is the Airbus A380, which has two passenger decks extending the full length of the fuselage, as well as a full-length lower third deck for cargo. It entered regular service in late-October 2007.

== List of double-deck aircraft ==
Double-deck flying boats

- Latécoère 521/522
- Martin M-130
- Latécoère 631
- Sud-Est SE.200 Amphitrite
- Boeing 314 Clipper
- Dornier Do-X
- Short Sandringham
- Short Empire C-Class and the related G-class
- Saunders-Roe Princess - did not enter service.

Partial second passenger deck

- Caproni Ca.48/58
  - Extra seats on top of the passenger cabin.
- Airbus A330 and Airbus A340
  - Optional lower deck lavatories and crew rest
- Airbus A350
  - Optional upper deck crew rest
- Boeing 377 Stratocruiser
  - Lower deck could be configured for lounge areas or additional seating

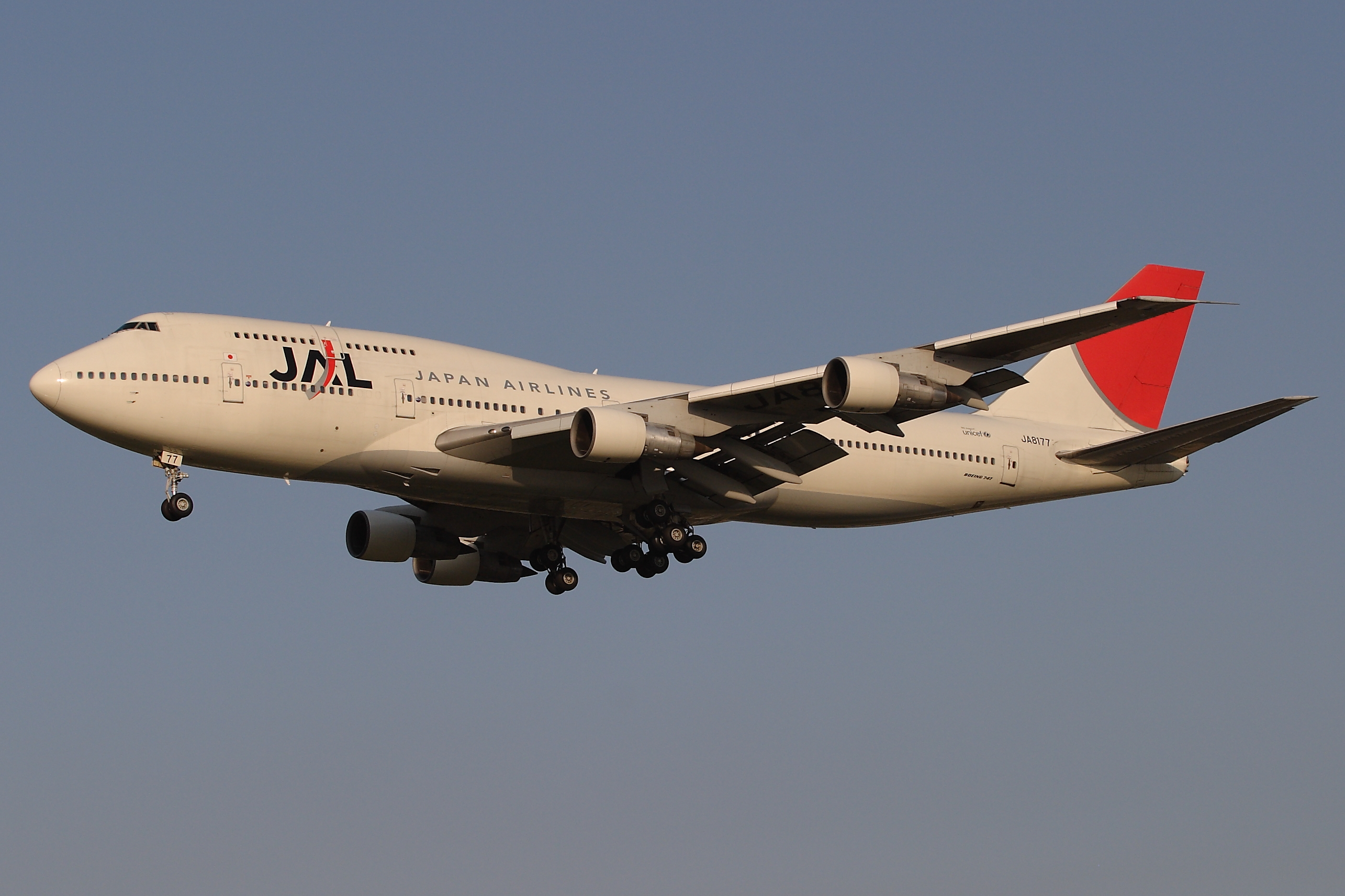
A JAL 747-300 with the stretched upper deck

- Boeing 747, SNC E-4C Survivable Airborne Operations Center, Boeing 747SP, Boeing E-4, Boeing 747-400, Boeing Dreamlifter, 747 Supertanker, Boeing YAL-1 and Boeing 747-8
  - Partial upper deck lounge areas or seating
  - Optional upper deck crew rest and galleys
- Boeing 767, Northrop Grumman E-10 MC2A, Boeing KC-767, Boeing E-767 and Boeing KC-46 Pegasus
  - Optional lower level crew rest area sleeps six
- Boeing 777 and Boeing 777X
  - Optional lower deck lavatories and galley
  - Optional upper deck crew rest
- Boeing 787
  - Optional upper deck crew rest
- Junkers G.38
- Ilyushin Il-86
  - Lower deck galley
  - Lower deck "self loading luggage storage"
- Lockheed L-1011 Tristar
  - Lower deck galley
  - Lower deck lounge (Pacific Southwest Airlines) (LTU International)
- McDonnell Douglas DC-10
  - Lower deck galleys
- Tupolev Tu-114
  - Lower deck galleys.
  - Lower deck aircrew rest area.

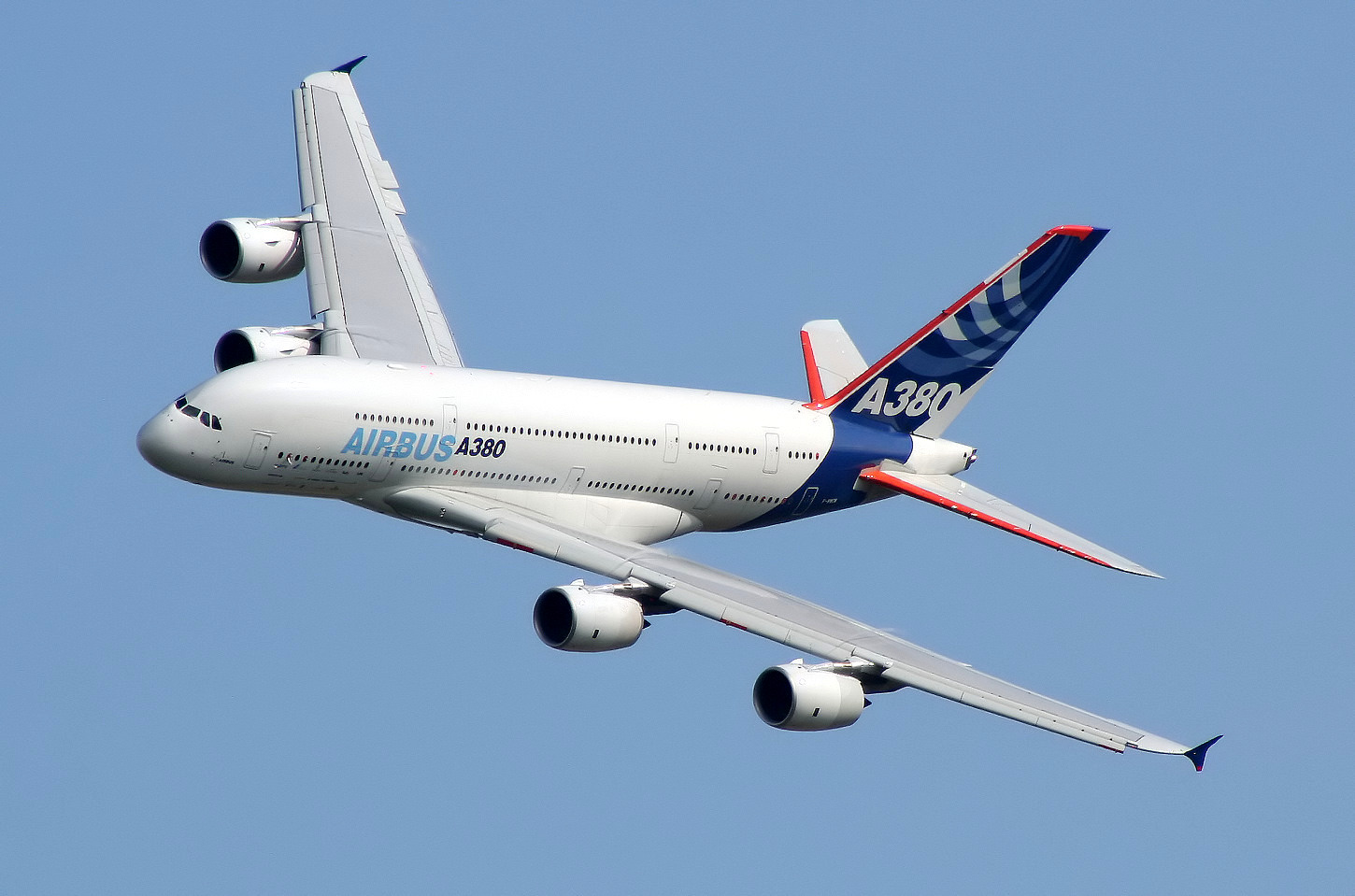
Airbus A380

Full second passenger deck

- Breguet 761, 763 and 765
- Airbus A380

Cargo aircraft with a separate passenger deck

- Antonov An-22
- Antonov An-225 Mriya
- Antonov An-124 Ruslan
- Lockheed C-5 Galaxy and Lockheed C-5M Super Galaxy
- Boeing C-97 Stratofreighter
- Douglas C-124 Globemaster II
- Short Belfast
- Lockheed R6V Constitution
- Blackburn Beverley - military transport, the main deck could be used for cargo or troops

Double-deck cargo aircraft

- Aviation Traders Carvair
- Armstrong Whitworth AW.660 Argosy
- Bristol Freighter
- Convair XC-99
- Douglas C-124 Globemaster II

Canceled projects for double-deck passenger aircraft

- Bach Super Transport
- McDonnell Douglas MD-12
- Sukhoi KR-860
- Vickers VC-10 Superb: see Vickers VC-10 § Development and production
- Tupolev Tu-404

== See also ==
- Large aircraft
- Wide-body aircraft
