= Boeing New Large Airplane =

1990s concept for an all-new quadjet airliner in the 500+ seat market

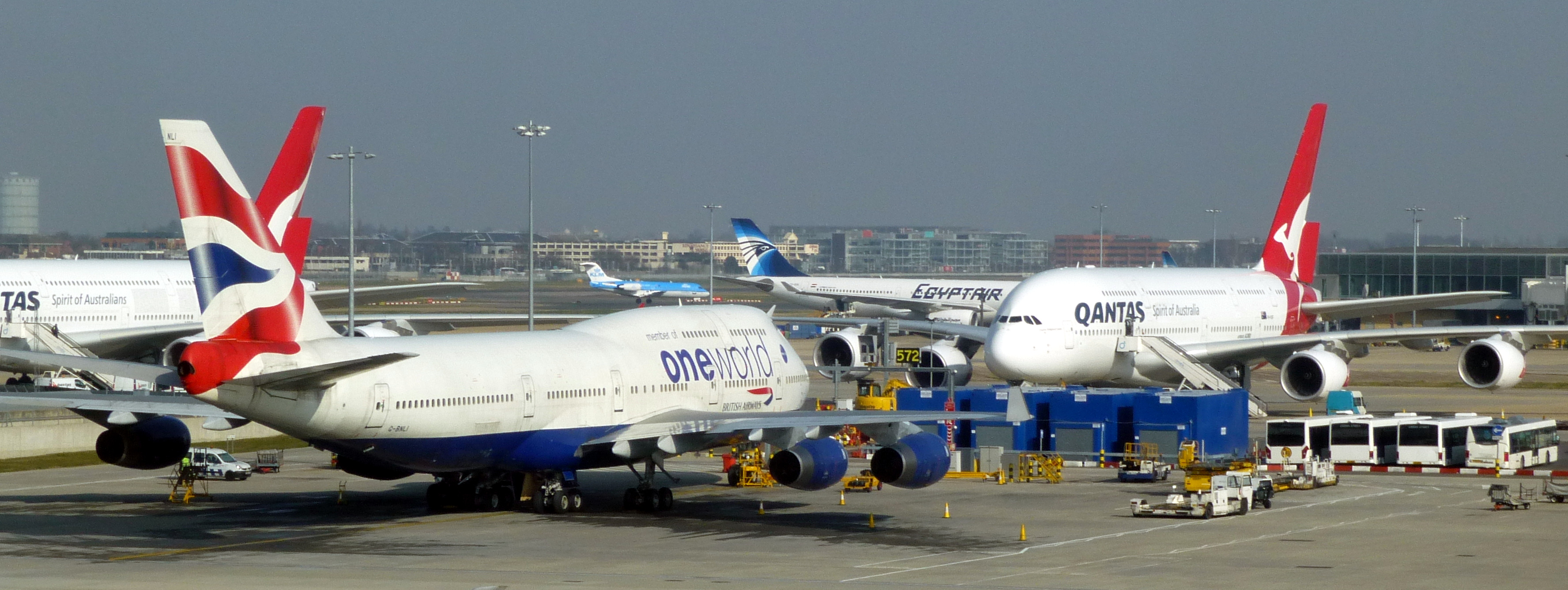
Two of the largest commercial airliners in service, the Boeing 747-400 and Airbus A380.

The Boeing NLA, or New Large Airplane, was a 1990s concept for an all-new quadjet airliner in the 500+ seat market. With a proposed size somewhat larger than the 747, it was a similar concept to the McDonnell Douglas MD-12 and later Airbus A380. In 1993, Boeing chose not to pursue development of this concept, focusing instead on the Boeing 747-500X and -600X, and then on the 747X and 747X Stretch, and subsequently on the Boeing 747-8.

== History ==
The Boeing New Large Airplane was one of several projects proposed by Boeing in the late 20th century as ways to compete with its rival Airbus. The Airbus A380 project began to be publicized in 1990 in order to try and turn the commercial aviation market away from the then very prevalent Boeing 747. Boeing sought to combat this and began working up designs for the NLA in the early 1990s, with a projected service entry date of before 2000 in order to beat the Airbus A380.

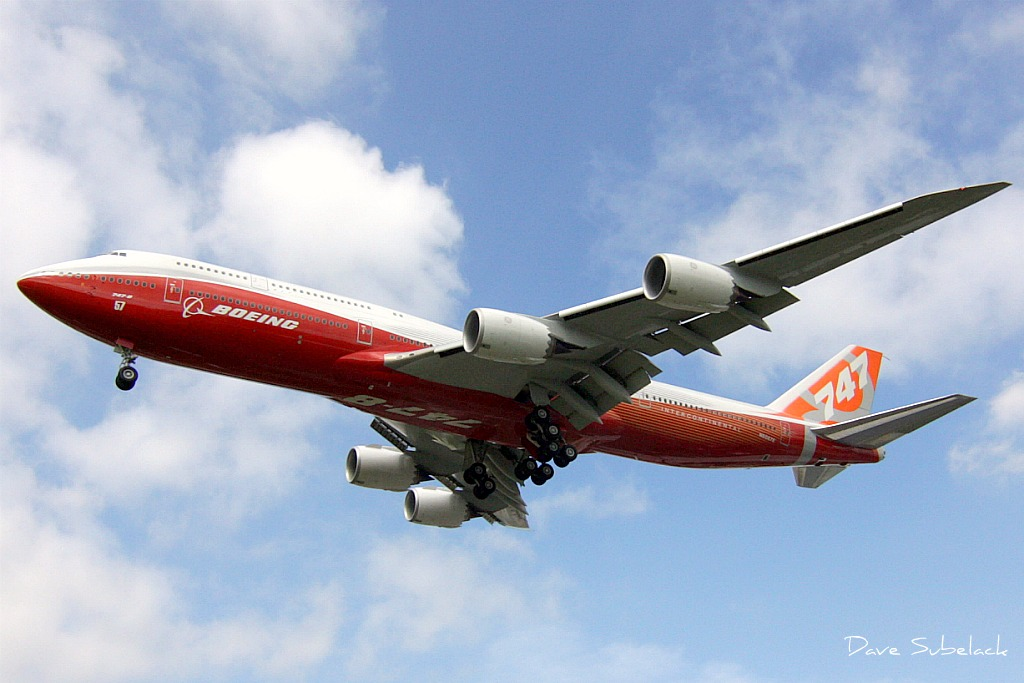
The Boeing 747-8 would later become the ultimate evolution of the 747 family amid decreasing interest in the jumbojet sector.

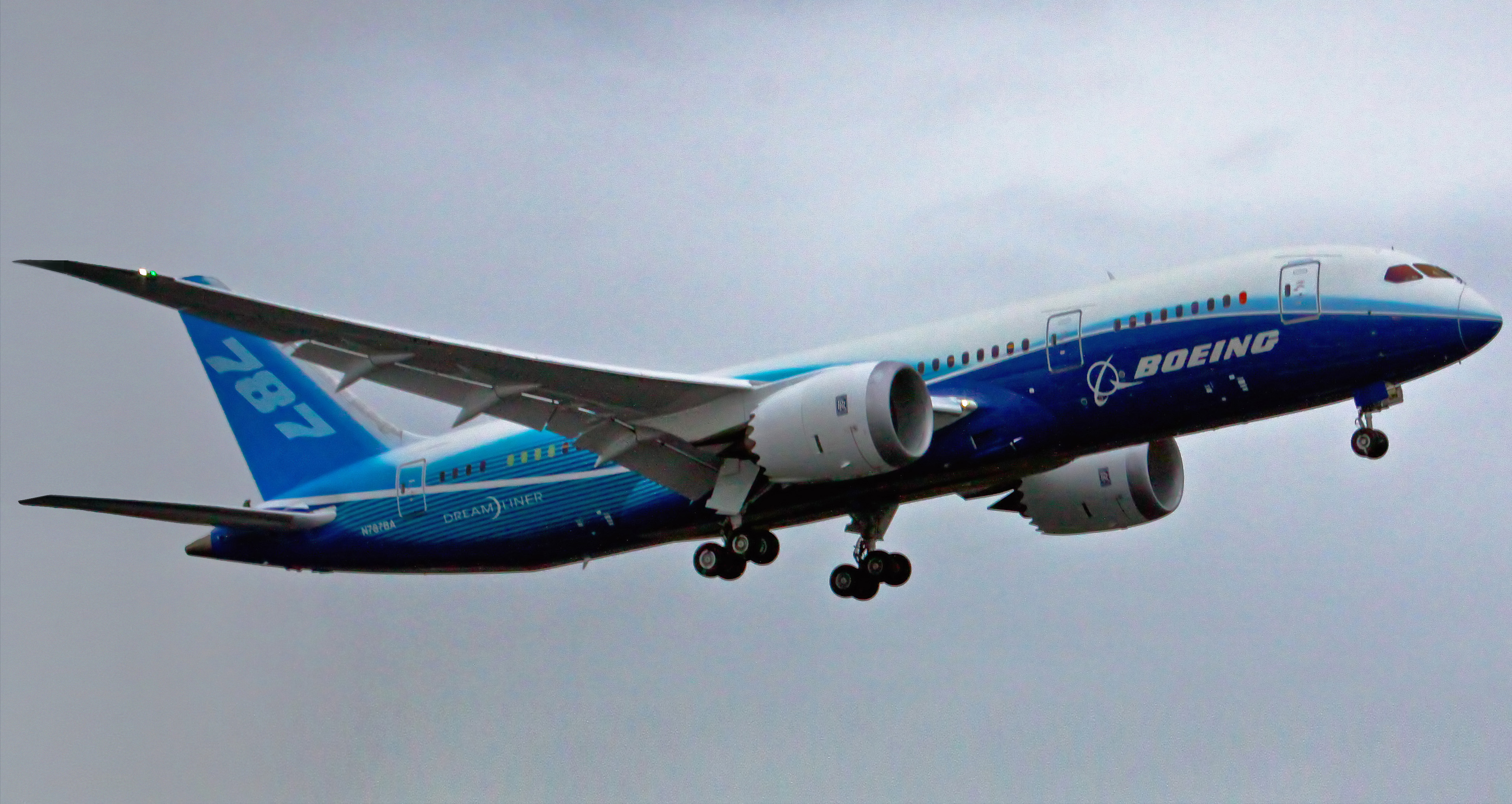
Medium-sized twinjets like the Boeing 787 Dreamliner and Boeing 777 are later preferred by Boeing and the whole market.

The goal of the NLA project was to create an airplane capable of traveling primarily long-haul routes and carrying vast amounts of passengers or cargo. At the time of design, ETOPS had not been introduced, and twinjet aircraft were not considered suitable for transpacific flights, so the NLA was designed with a four-jet layout (two on each wing), much like the 747 and the A380. It was designed to fly long-haul, high-demand flights such as Sydney to Dubai or London to New York, taking from 8 to 14 hours. With the goal of beating its competitors based on sheer passenger volume, the NLA design was to have included a full-length two deck configuration. This would have allowed for 600–1000 passengers (depending on airline and class seating configurations), about 50 more passengers than the A380 per configuration.

However, after only a few years of working on the project, Boeing decided that the NLA model was unsustainable with the way the commercial aviation market was trending. Instead of larger, higher capacity aircraft with the ability to make long hub-to-hub routes in a single go, Boeing decided the future was in smaller, more direct flights. As a result, they cancelled the NLA project.

== Specifications (NLA, as designed) ==
Cockpit crew	Two
Seating capacity	606 (3-class)
Length overall	244 ft 4 in (74.47 m)
Wingspan	260 ft 0 in (79.25 m)
Height	77 ft 8 in (23.67 m)
Maximum take-off weight	454,000 kg (1,001,000 lb)
Range at design load	7,800 nmi (14,400 km; 8,980 mi)
Engines (4×)	General Electric GE90

Source: Seattle Post-Intelligencer

== See also ==
- Boeing New Midsize Airplane
- Boeing Yellowstone Project

Related development

- Boeing 747-8

Aircraft of comparable role, configuration, and era

- Airbus A380
- McDonnell Douglas MD-12
- Sukhoi KR-860
