= McDonnell Douglas MD-12 =

Planned double-deck wide-body airliner, never produced

MD-12
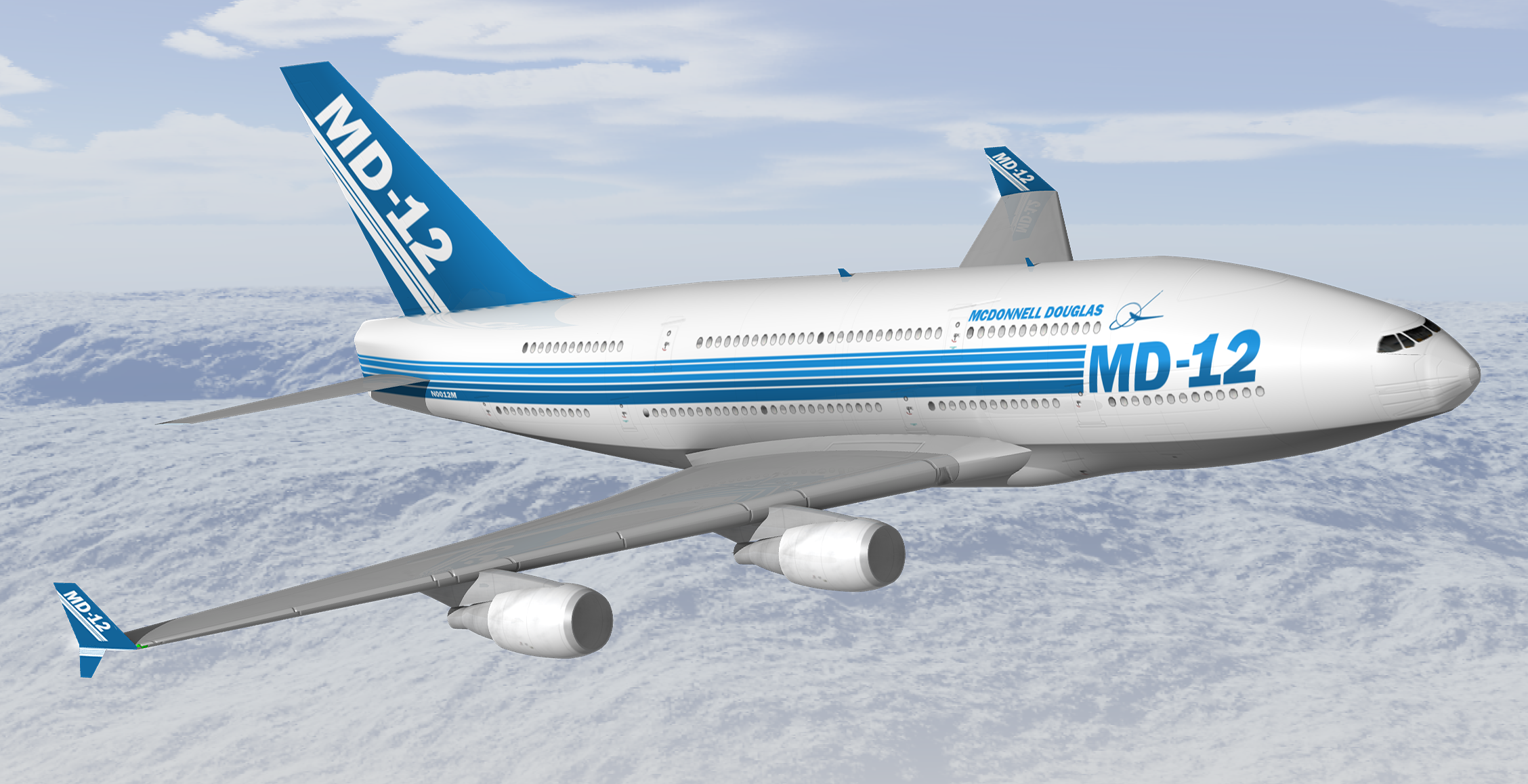
- A computer rendering of the proposed MD-12, a full double-decker configuration concept

General information
- Type: Double-decker wide-body aircraft
- National origin: United States
- Manufacturer: McDonnell Douglas
- Status: Design study, cancelled

The McDonnell Douglas MD-12 was a large wide-body airliner concept planned by McDonnell Douglas in the 1990s. It was first conceived as a trijet larger than the MD-11, then stretched to a quadjet airliner. It was to be similar in size to the Boeing 747, but with greater passenger capacity through two full-length passenger decks. However, the MD-12 received no orders and was canceled. McDonnell Douglas then studied larger MD-11 derivatives named MD-XX without proceeding.

== Design and development ==
=== Background ===
McDonnell Douglas studied improved, stretched versions of the MD-11 trijet, named MD-12X with a possible lower-front passenger deck with panoramic windows. The MDC board of directors agreed in October 1991 to offer the MD-12X design to airlines. The MD-12X had a length of 237 ft 11 in (72.5 m) and a wingspan of 212 ft 6 in (64.8 m). In November 1991, McDonnell Douglas and Taiwan Aerospace Corporation signed a Memorandum of Understanding to form a company to produce the new design. The new company would have McDonnell Douglas as the majority shareholder (51%) with Taiwan Aerospace (40%) and other Asian companies (9%) having the remaining shares.

=== MD-12 ===
In late 1991, McDonnell Douglas made a move to separate its civil and military divisions in a bid to raise the estimated $4 billion development costs needed to develop the MD-12X trijet. Separating the costly development of the military C-17 airlifter, which had been a drain on the company's resources, from the profitable production of the MD-80 and MD-11 airliners would make it easier to attract foreign investors for the MD-12X.

The design grew into the much larger MD-12 with four engines and two passenger decks extending the length of the fuselage. The length of the main MD-12 variants was 208 ft (63.4 m) with a wingspan of 213 ft (64.9 m). The fuselage was 24 ft 3 in (7.39 m) wide by 27 ft 11 in (8.51 m) high.

McDonnell Douglas unveiled its MD-12 design in April 1992. The design was similar in concept to the Airbus A3XX and Boeing New Large Airplane, and it would have been larger than the Boeing 747 with which it would have directly competed. Douglas Aircraft also studied a smaller double-decker design in the 1960s for the aircraft that would eventually become the DC-10.

The first flight of the MD-12 was to take place in late 1995, with delivery in 1997. Despite aggressive marketing and initial excitement, especially in the aviation press, no orders were placed for the aircraft. MDC lacked the resources after Taiwan Aerospace left the project. Some skeptics believed that MDC launched the project to lure Boeing into paying a higher price for the company. A new double-deck widebody has proved to be extremely expensive and complex to develop, even for the remaining aerospace giants Boeing and Airbus. The massive Airbus A380, similar in concept to the MD-12, was eventually built, but did not achieve financial success.

=== MD-XX ===
With the MD-12 program over, McDonnell Douglas focused on 300 to 400–seat MD-11 derivatives. At the 1996 Farnborough International Air Show, the company presented plans for a new trijet with high-seating and long-range named "MD-XX". The MD-XX was offered in two variants; MD-XX Stretch with a longer fuselage and MD-XX LR for longer range. Both MD-XX variant designs had 213 ft (64.9 m) wingspan, the same as MD-12. The MD-XX Stretch was lengthened 32 ft (9.8 m) over the MD-11 and had seating for 375 in a typical 3-class arrangement and 515 in all-economy seating. Its range was to be 7,020 nmi (8,080 mi; 13,000 km). The MD-XX LR was the same length as the MD-11, had seating for 309 in a typical 3-class arrangement and featured a range of 8,320 nmi (9,570 mi; 15,400 km). However, the MDC board of directors decided to end the MD-XX program in October 1996, stating the financial investment for the program was too large for the company.

== Variants ==
The MD-12 was offered in a few proposed variants as listed below.

- MD-12 HC (High Capacity)
- MD-12 LR (Long Range)
- MD-12 ST (Stretch)
- MD-12 Twin (two-engine version)

== Specifications (MD-12 High Capacity design) ==
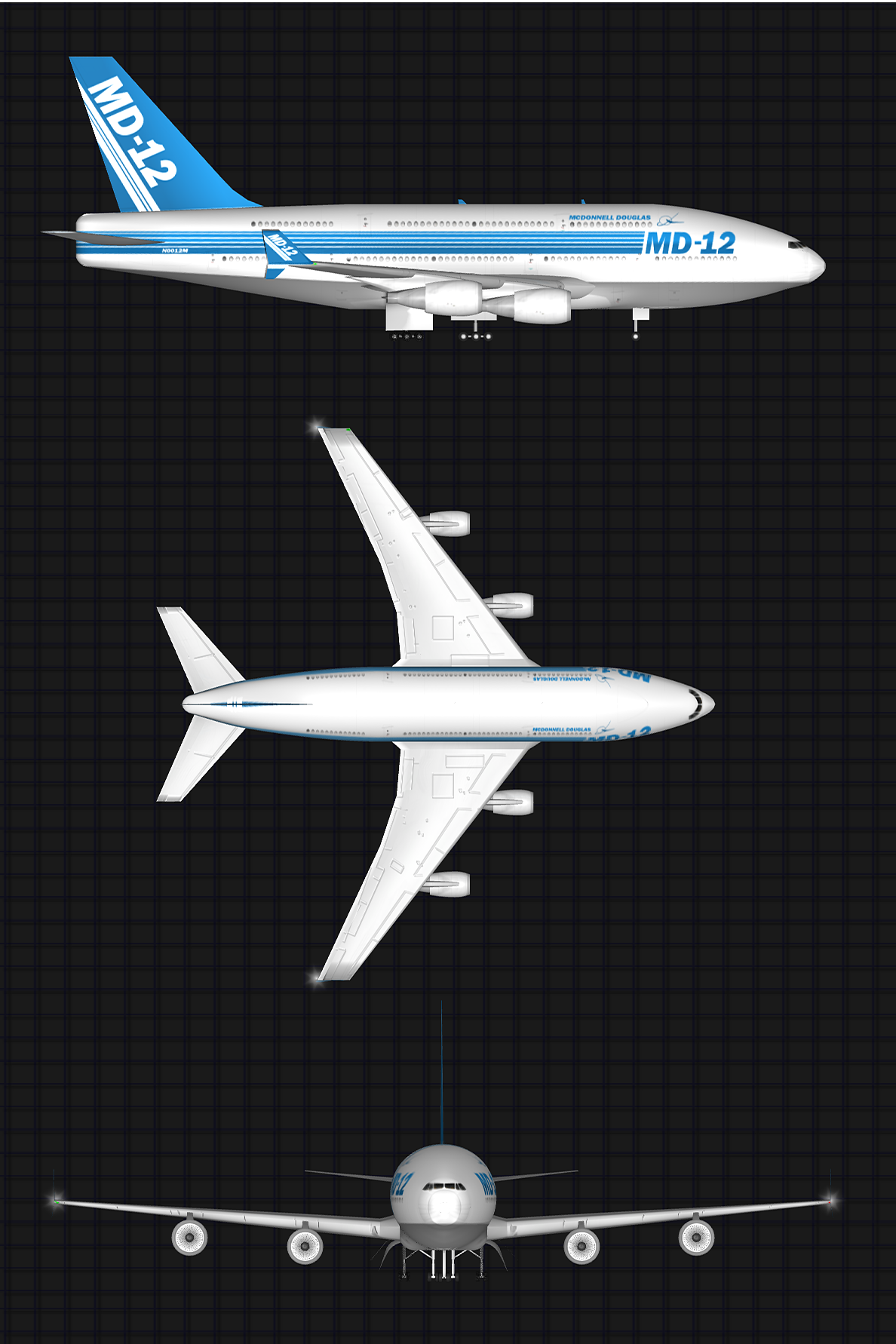
MD-12 three views

Data from McDonnell Douglas promotional materials

General characteristics

- Crew: 2 (pilot and co-pilot)
- Capacity: Long range: 430 passengers (3-class) / High-capacity: 511 passengers (1-class)
- Length: 208 ft 0 in (63.40 m)
- Wingspan: 213 ft 0 in (64.92 m)
- Height: 74 ft 0 in (22.55 m)
- Wing area: 5,846 sq ft (543.1 m^{2})
- Empty weight: 402,700 lb (187,650 kg)
- Max takeoff weight: 949,000 lb (430,500 kg)
- Powerplant: 4 × General Electric CF6-80C2 high-bypass turbofans, 61,500 lbf (274 kN) thrust each

Performance

- Maximum speed: 565 kn (650 mph, 1,050 km/h)
- Maximum speed: Mach 0.85
- Range: 7,170 nmi (8,251 mi, 13,279 km)
- Wing loading: 162.3 lb/sq ft (792.7 kg/m^{2})

== See also ==
Related development

- McDonnell Douglas MD-11

Aircraft of comparable role, configuration, and era

- Airbus A380
- Boeing NLA (proposed)
- Boeing 747-8
- Sukhoi KR-860 (proposed)
