= Sukhoi KR-860 =

Russian aircraft proposal

General information
- Type: Double decker airliner
- National origin: Russia
- Manufacturer: Sukhoi
- Status: Proposal (only built a 1/24 scale model)
- Number built: 0

The Sukhoi KR-860 "Wings of Russia" (Russian: КР-860 «Крылья России», romanized: Kryl'ya Rossii), earlier named the SKD-717, was a proposed design for a double decker wide-body superjumbo jet aircraft by Russian aerospace company Sukhoi. A 1/24th scale model was shown at the 1999 Paris Air Show.

== Development ==
The design had a maximum weight of about 650 tonnes, a payload of about 300 tonnes, the main deck having a 12-abreast seating with three aisles, while the upper deck had 9-abreast seating with two aisles. It was intended to carry 860 to 1000 passengers. Entry would be through conventional fuselage doors or forward and aft ventral escalators. The wing design had winglets and a fold outboard of the outer engine. For comparison the Antonov An-225 had a maximum weight of 640 tonnes and a payload of 250 tonnes. A 1/24 scale model was shown at the 1999 Paris Air Show. If built, the aircraft would have been the world's largest, widest, and heaviest airliner.

The concept for the aircraft began in the 1990s with a forecast programme cost of US$10 billion (early published figures were US$4–5.5B) and called for the first aircraft to be built before 2000. With an estimated price per unit of about US$160–200 million (an earlier published estimate was US$150 million) the market was forecast for a total of 300 aircraft, with production planned for the Kazan Aircraft Production Association facility. Initially designed for the carriage of passengers, later a KR-860T (T stands for Tanker) version was proposed for use as an aerial liquefied natural gas (LNG) tanker for far-north regions. Taking advantage of the presence of LNG on the aircraft, the design proposed using LNG to fuel the turbines, rather than conventional jet fuel, like on the Tupolev Tu-206.

The project did not proceed beyond the stage of marketing models.

== Specifications (projected - KR-860) ==
Data from rusarmy.com

General characteristics

- Capacity: 860–1,000 passengers
- Length: 80 m (262 ft 6 in)
- Wingspan: 88 m (288 ft 9 in) with the wings unfolded or 64 m (210 ft) span with wings folded
- Wing area: 700 m^{2} (7,500 sq ft)
- Max takeoff weight: 650,000 kg (1,433,005 lb)
- Powerplant: 4 × General Electric CF6-80E1A4B turbofan, 320 kN (72,000 lbf) thrust each or
- Powerplant: 4 × Pratt & Whitney PW4168A turbofan, 305 kN (68,600 lbf) thrust each

Performance

- Cruise speed: 1,000 km/h (620 mph, 540 kn)
- Range: 15,000 km (9,300 mi, 8,100 nmi)

== See also ==
- Airbus A380
- Antonov An-225 Mriya
- Boeing 747-8
- Boeing New Large Airplane
- Ilyushin Il-96-400M
- Lockheed C-5 Galaxy
- McDonnell Douglas MD-12
