= Nielsen & Winther Type AA =

Nielsen & Winther Type Aa
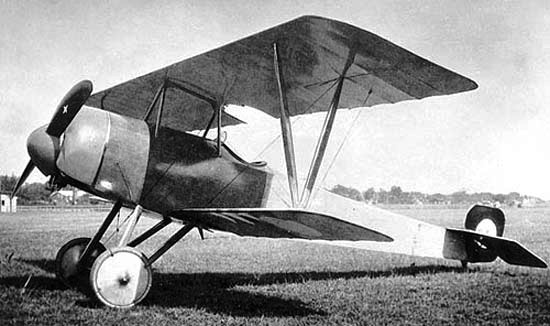

General information
- Type: Single-seat fighter
- National origin: Sweden/Denmark
- Manufacturer: Nielsen & Winther A/S, Denmark
- Designer: Enoch Thulin
- Primary user: Danish Army
- Number built: 6

History
- Introduction date: 1917
- First flight: 21 January 1917
- Retired: 1919

The Nielsen & Winther Type Aa was a single-seat biplane fighter aircraft, designed in Sweden by Enoch Thulin and manufactured in Denmark in 1916–1917 by Nielsen & Winther in Copenhagen.

== Development ==
The first fighter aircraft to be built in Denmark, the Nielsen and Winther Type Aa was designed during World War I by the Swedish aircraft manufacturer Enoch Thulin in 1916, and designated as his Type M. (Note: What seems to be a Type M appears in the background of a photo of Thulin's AB Thulinverken stand at the 1918 Christiana Aero Show. Source: "Airisms from the Four Winds". Flight. X (29): 803 [17]. 18 July 1918. Apart from Tryggve Gran's record-breaking Bleriot XI (indistinct, top left—Thulin made licence-built copies of the XI, sold as his Type A) the other aircraft are a Thulin K monoplane also suspended from the roof, and the sole prototype trimotor Thulin H.)

Although Thulin had previously sold aircraft made by his AETA firm (A.B Enoch Thulins Aeroplanfabrik, (later AB Thulinverken) based in Landskrona) to the Swedish military (e.g. Thulin C, Thulin G) they were not interested in this machine, and the design was sold or licensed to Nielsen & Winther (N&W) as their first aircraft model. The existing firm of Nielsen and Winther was a long-established machine factory making machine tools. The director of the newly-formed Aircraft Department of Nielsen and Winther was 1st Lt. Johan B. Ussing, holder of Danish pilot's licence no. 1. (Note: The holder of Danish pilot's licence No. 3 was Alfred Nervø, a journalist for Politiken who made the first flight over downtown Copenhagen in June 1910 (see Kløvermarken § Aviation pioneering hub.) The firm's chief engineer was Henrik Funch-Thomson, who had previously worked at the German aircraft maker of Hansa-Brandenburg.

During 1917 six Type Aa aircraft were built and delivered to the Danish Army Air Corps, and stationed at the Army Aviation School at Klovermarken: they appear to have been used for training the more experienced pilots. They were retired from flying in 1919 after three of the six had crashed, perhaps owing to engine unreliability. (Note: Broe, Jesper. "Nielsen & Winther Type Aa". This website includes many photos of the offices and factory, including building the type Aa, constructing the wings etc, and several photos of the manufacturing of the rotary engine - cylinders, crankshaft, and two pics of the engine being turned over. Plus the final photo is of the Type Ac with floats.)

During its short existence, the aircraft department of N&W manufactured a total of 16 machines (the majority based on the Thulin-designed Type Aa), and twenty Scania-Vabis PD engines of 110 hp, copies of the German Mercedes D.II. A glut of cheap ex-military aircraft in the civilian market after the war meant that making new machines swiftly became unprofitable (this affected all combatants in the war) and Nielsen and Winther were bought out in 1920 by dk:Vølund A/S.

== Description ==
The single seat Type Aa was a sesquiplane of wooden construction, powered by a '90 hp' Thulin type A rotary engine, (Note: The Thulin A engine was a license-made copy of the Le Rhône 9C of 80 hp (60 kW). Nielsen and Winther, an established firm making machine tools, manufactured 20 Thulin A engines. Thulinverken AB, the plane's designer, also manufactured licensed copies of two Le Rhône rotary engines: the 9-cylinder Le Rhône 9C of 80 hp (licensed as Thulin Type A engines); and the 11-cylinder 11F of 100 hp (sold as the Thulin Type G engine.) These engine types are not to be confused with his aircraft designs, which used a similar lettered designation, eg Thulin L. Most sources (including Kofoed 1977) state 90 hp, but in fact Le Rhône never made an engine of this specific power. It is possible that Thulin "massaged" the performance figures of the 80 hp 9C engine. Another source says that the power of the Thulin type A was suspected to be overstated. One source says that during 1915–19 the Thulin factory made about 100 aircraft of 15 different types (partly for exports), and over 600 aero engines were manufactured.) and armed with an 8mm Madsen machine gun mounted on the top wing firing over the propeller. (Note: The Madsen used an open bolt firing mechanism, which is inherently unsuitable for synchronising with an interrupter gear.) Ground tests by the manufacturers with synchronising equipment took place in 1918 and were apparently successful, reportedly using a Type Aa with the gun mounted on the side of the fuselage: but there is no evidence that air firing tests took place.

In the History of Danish Flight (pub. 1936) major-general C. Førslev (first commander of the Danish Army Air Corps) described the N&W fighters: "They flew well and had good speed and lift, but their Thulin engines were hardly reliable, and the airmen had—whether rightly or wrongly is difficult to decide now—no basic confidence that the frame itself was solid enough to withstand violent manoevers".

== Operational history ==
At the time of the Type Aa's introduction, the aircraft business in the Danish Army was quite loosely organized, and there was in fact only one unit, the Army Flying School, run by the Danish Army Air Corps which was based at Klovermarken in Copenhagen. The fighters were not assigned to an active squadron, but were used by the Flying School; and it was only the more experienced pilots who were allowed to fly them.

The maiden flight of the Type Aa (manufacturer's serial N&W 1) took place on 21 January 1917, piloted by sergeant H. A. Ehlers. On testing, the aircraft reached a maximum speed of 144.7 kilometres per hour (89.9 mph) and rose to a height of 1,609 metres (5,279 ft) in 10 minutes. On 21 March 1917, Ehlers set a Scandinavian altitude record of 4,000 m with a N&W Aa. It took 29 minutes for the ascent. The achievement brought him a gold watch with the inscription from the factory.

N&W fighter No. 2 was flown in March 1917 by First Lieutenant (dk:Premierløjtnant) M. Hofoed-Jensen, and the rest followed over the following months. Hofoed-Jensen broke Ehlers's altitude record on 28 December 1917 in N&W 6, achieving 5,000 metres (16,000 ft), for which feat he won the Royal Danish Aeronautical Society trophy for 1917.

== Incidents ==
On 17 December 1917 while dk:løjtnant E. Sætter-Lassen was flying N&W 2, the engine failed and the plane burst into flames. Although badly burned, the pilot managed to land, but died in hospital. During a formation flight from Lundtofte to Kløvermarken on 17 October 1918 Gustav Friese was killed in N&W 6 when it crashed into the Ravenholm paper factory north of Copenhagen. (Note: The Ravenholm factory (founded 1907) was described as "one of the most modern paper factories in the world".) On 9 March 1919 1st Lt F. P. E. Jacobsen died in N&W 3 during an exercise flight at Kløvermarken.

As a result, the Danish War Ministry grounded the remaining aircraft, and all other planes using Thulin engines. Thulin himself died in Sweden on 14 May 1919 while flying his own new Thulin K near Landskrona.

N&W 1 was withdrawn from use (wfu) on 31 March 1919. N&W 4 and 5 were subsequently used as rolling ground training machines, with the fabric removed from the wings so that the aircraft could not lift off even if it was running at a fairly high speed across the airfield. In this way, the flying student could practice using the rudder without the danger of getting airborne. 'Nose-overs', on the other hand, did happen. (Note: Photos of wingless types Aa and C on pp. 4–5:)

It appears that the two remaining Type Aa aircraft were rebuilt: N&W 5 had previously been given the "crinoline" treatment (i.e., formal moldings on the rear fuselage so it became more round and streamlined. (These may be the two Type Cs, at least one with Bd-type rear fuselage and new wings. (Note: Photo of overturned ground trainer with new rear fuselage.) The two appliances were still being used in this way in the summer of 1921.During the next few years no new pilots were trained by the army, and in 1924 the remains of the N&W Aa fighters were finally retired.

== Variants ==
- Type Aa
  - Original single-seat fighter, 6 delivered to Danish Army Air Force, serials N&W 1–6
- Type Ab
  - Two-seat reconnaissance version, serials N&W 70 and 71. Two ordered for fledging Bolivian Air Force. One was delivered to Albert Jarfelt (Note: Sometimes spelled as "Jarfeldt" in reports, like Thomson and Thompson.) in Argentina but crashed on the way to Bolivia. Jarfelt survived. The other type Ab, N&W 71, was not delivered. (Note: For a little more on Jarfelt, see es:Fuerza Aérea Boliviana#Década de 1910. Photo of Jarfelt at "Rathbone Museum of World War II Aviators, Uniforms and Wings". Facebook. "Copenhagen 1927 - This is an Underwood & Underwood press photo of Cliff Harmon (left), aviation booster, president of the International Flying League and founder of the Harmon trophy, and Albert Jarfelt (right), the head of the Bolivian Air Corps, who was about to embark on a Denmark-to-Bolivia distance flight. Now check out that amazing big bird on Jarfelt's chest." [A large embroidered pilot's wing.])
- Type Ac
  - 2-seat floatplane version of the Type Aa, single prototype. Same engine but with altered fuselage and tail/tailplane as the Ab: and different wings. Crashed and written off by Henry Erlind during a landing in Øresund; the passenger was the film actress Stella Lind (b.1892). She worked at Nordisk Film, and acquired motorcycle, car and aircraft licenses. She died on 1 July 1919 of pneumonia after a plane crash in the sea.
- Type Bd
  - 2-seat floatplane with 110 hp (82 kW) Scania-Vabis PD engine and new fuselage, with wings from the Type Ac - essentially a different design; one example exported to the Royal Norwegian Navy Air Service. (Note: The Scania-Vabis 110 hp appears to have been a copy of the Mercedes D.II. An example of the latest Albatros B.IIa was being flown around northern Europe on a sales tour by the manufacturers just before WWI began, and the propeller and landing gear were damaged on landing in Sweden in July 1914. This version used a Mercedes D.II engine, developing around 110–120 hp, with a bore and stroke of 125 x 150 mm. Around 45 copies of the Albatros were made in Sweden during the war, and the engine was also reproduced as the 110 hp Scania-Vabis PD. See also photos of the Scania-Vabis PD 110 hp engine installed in Swedish aircraft: Confusingly, a number of other German aero engines have been variously cited as the basis of this motor, including the Mercedes D.I of 100 hp, the Benz Bz.III of 150 hp, and the Mercedes D.III of 160 hp: but only the Mercedes D.II has a comparable power output to the Scania-Vabis motor. Thulin may also have made and sold a similar version of this engine as the Thulin E.)

== Operators ==
Denmark

- Danish Army (Royal Danish Army Air Corps)

Norway

- Royal Norwegian Air Force

== Aircraft on display ==
- Danmarks Flyvemuseum, Helsingør: Replica Type Aa

== Specifications (Type Aa) ==
Data from Green

General characteristics

- Crew: 1
- Length: 6.60 m (21 ft 8 in)
- Wingspan: 7.70 m (25 ft 3.13 in)
- Height: 2.8 m (9 ft 2.25 in)
- Empty weight: 350 kg (772 lb)
- Gross weight: 550 kg (1,212 lb)
- Powerplant: 1 × Thulin A rotary engine (license-built Le Rhône 9C) , 67 kW (90 hp)

Performance

- Maximum speed: 150 km/h (93 mph, 81 kn)

Armament

- 1 x 8 mm Madsen machine gun
