= Thulin LA =

1917 Swedish biplane

LA
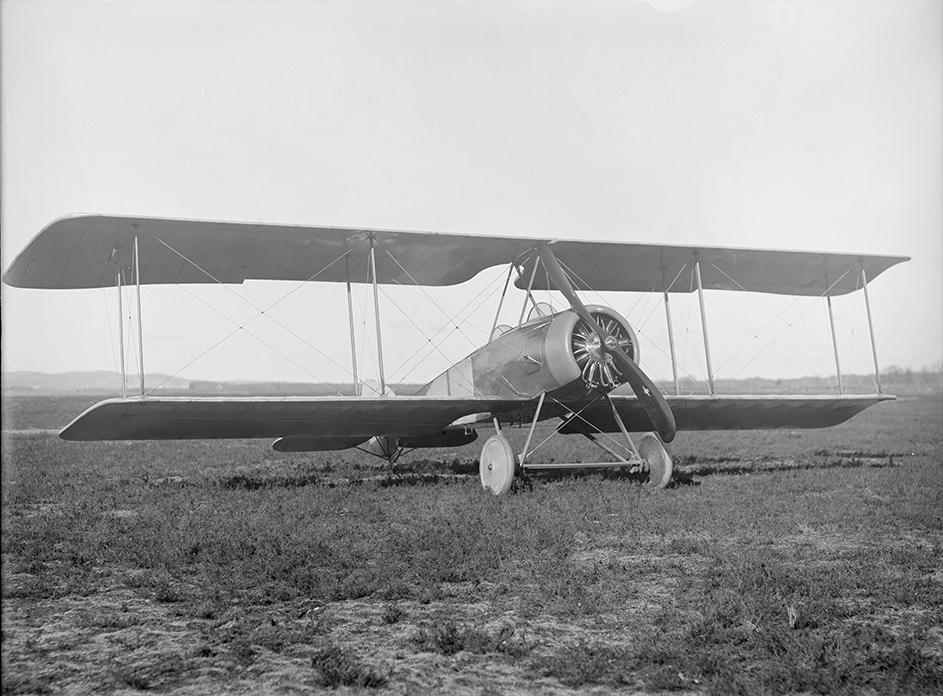

General information
- Type: Trainer aircraft
- Manufacturer: AB Thulinverken
- Designer: Enoch Thulin
- Primary users: Finnish Air Force; Dutch Air Force
- Number built: 15

History
- Introduction date: 1917
- Retired: 1920

The Thulin LA was a Swedish two-seat, single-engine biplane designed by Enoch Thulin in 1917 and made by his company AB Thulinverken in Landskrona. It was based on the earlier Thulin L and E aircraft, with a new engine, fuselage and empennage. The L and E types were in turn based on the German Albatros B.II aircraft, like the NAB Albatros. The Thulin LA was used in Sweden, the Netherlands (10) and Finland (1). This type also made the first passenger transport flights between Sweden and Denmark in 1919. Altogether there were 15 Thulin LAs built.

== Engine ==
The engine used was a Thulin G, which was an 11-cylinder 75 kW (100 hp) Le Rhône 11F (bore x stroke 105 mm × 140 mm (4.1 in × 5.5 in)), (Note: The Le Rhône 11F was essentially an enlarged 9-cylinder Le Rhône 9C with two extra cylinders, developing 15 kW (20 hp) more.) manufactured under licence by Thulinverken in Sweden. Thulin had journeyed to France in 1915 and acquired the licence to manufacture it from Gnome et Rhône, as well as the Le Rhône 9C, which was sold as the Thulin A. The Thulin-built engine, with a dry weight of 168 kg (370 lb), replaced the much heavier original engine of the Albatros B.II, a Mercedes D.II 89 kW (120 hp) 6-cylinder inline water-cooled engine weighing 240 kg (530 lb).

== Use in Finland ==
The Finnish Air Force (The Whites) received one aircraft as a gift from Sweden from the grocery magnate G. Svensson in the spring of 1918.

The aircraft arrived by ship at Turku on 5 May 1918, where it was used at the Turku Flying School (Turun Lentokoulu), established on 1 May 1918. The flying school was renamed V Flying Detachment (V Lento-osasto) of the Finnish Air Force on 1 October 1918. The aircraft was mainly used as a trainer aircraft and was destroyed in a crash due to engine malfunction outside Helsinki's Pohjoissatama harbour in February 1919.

== Variants ==
Thulin also made a floatplane version of the LA, based on the Albatros B.II-W ("Wasserflugzeug").

== Operators ==
Finland

- Finnish Air Force

Netherlands

- Royal Netherlands Navy

Sweden

- Swedish Air Force

== Specifications (LA) ==
Data from

General characteristics

- Crew: 2
- Length: 7.8 m (25 ft 7 in)
- Wingspan: 11.5 m (37 ft 9 in)
- Height: 3.4 m (11 ft 2 in)
- Wing area: 36 m^{2} (390 sq ft)
- Powerplant: 1 × Thulin G 11-cylinder rotary piston engine, 75 kW (101 hp)

Performance

- Maximum speed: 120 km/h (75 mph, 65 kn)

== See also ==
Related lists

- List of military aircraft of Sweden
