= Thulin N =

1910s Swedish aircraft

Type N

General information
- Type: Fighter aircraft
- Manufacturer: AB Thulinverken
- Designer: Enoch Thulin
- Number built: 1

History
- First flight: 1917
- Variant: Thulin NA

The Thulin N was a prototype Swedish scout aircraft built in the late 1910s.

== Design and development ==
The Thulin N was a two-seat biplane. Both the upper and lower wings were fitted with knuckles which were connected by a push rod. The fuselage was provided with an open cockpit where one was placed in a tandem location. The fuselage is made of a lattice construction of welded steel pipes . The wheel ground was fixed with a spur spring under the height knob. Although the Swedish military asked Thulin to use a 150-hp Benz engine as the powerplant, Thulin opted for a Thulin G rotary engine.

== Specifications ==
General characteristics

- Crew: 2
- Length: 5.65 m (18 ft 6 in)
- Wingspan: 7.86 m (25 ft 9 in)
- Height: 2.74 m (9 ft 0 in)
- Gross weight: 600 kg (1,323 lb)
- Powerplant: 1 × Thulin G 11-cylinder air-cooled rotary piston engine, 89 kW (120 hp)

Performance

- Maximum speed: 160 km/h (99 mph, 86 kn)

== See also ==
Related lists

- List of military aircraft of Sweden
