= Thulin E =

Thulin E may refer to:

- Thulin E (aircraft)
- Thulin E (engine)
