= Thulin L =

1910s Swedish aircraft

Type L

General information
- Type: Reconnaissance aircraft
- Manufacturer: AB Thulinverken
- Designer: Enoch Thulin
- Primary user: Swedish Air Force
- Number built: 5

History
- First flight: April 1916
- Variant: Thulin LA

The Thulin L was a Swedish reconnaissance plane built in the late 1910s.

== Design and development ==
The Thulin L was a two-seat biplane derived from the unsuccessful Thulin E. It differed from the latter in that the wing surface was increased and the float location was made easier. Four production Thulin L floatplanes were ordered July 4, 1916, and they were delivered from November 1916 to March 1917.

== Specifications ==
Data from

General characteristics

- Crew: 2
- Length: 7.5 m (24 ft 7 in)
- Wingspan: 11.6 m (38 ft 1 in)
- Height: 3.52 m (11 ft 7 in)
- Wing area: 36.5 m^{2} (393 sq ft)
- Gross weight: 965 kg (2,127 lb)
- Powerplant: 1 × Thulin A 9-cylinder air-cooled rotary piston engine, 67 kW (90 hp)

Performance

- Maximum speed: 120 km/h (75 mph, 65 kn)
- Cruise speed: 95 km/h (59 mph, 51 kn)

== See also ==
Related lists

- List of military aircraft of Sweden
