= Thulin H =

1910s Swedish aircraft

Type H

General information
- Type: Reconnaissance/bomber aircraft
- Manufacturer: AB Thulinverken
- Designer: Enoch Thulin
- Primary user: Swedish Air Force
- Number built: 1

History
- First flight: August 1917

The Thulin H was a Swedish reconnaissance/bomber plane built in the late 1910s.

== Design and development ==
The Thulin H was a five-seat biplane powered by three engines, one tractor and two arranged in separate nacelles in pusher form. It was designed to take off and land on water. The Type H flew in August 1917 and passed tests, but the end of World War I obviated the need for a large reconnaissance bomber floatplane. Enoch Thulin offered the Thulin H to the civilian market for use as a transport plane, but no orders were placed.

== Specifications ==
Data from

General characteristics

- Crew: 5
- Length: 11 m (36 ft 1 in)
- Wingspan: 20 m (65 ft 7 in)
- Wing area: 60 m^{2} (650 sq ft)
- Powerplant: 3 × Thulin A 9-cylinder air-cooled rotary piston engine, 67 kW (90 hp) each

Performance

- Maximum speed: 127 km/h (79 mph, 69 kn)
- Cruise speed: 110 km/h (68 mph, 59 kn)

== See also ==
Related lists

- List of military aircraft of Sweden
