= Self (company) =

- Industry: Automotive
- Headquarters: Svedala, Sweden
- Key people: Per Wiertz; Hugo Wiertz

Self was a series of three cyclecars built by the brothers Per and Hugo Wiertz in Svedala in 1916, 1919 and 1922.

The first car had a single-cylinder engine, the second a four-cylinder Phänomen and the third a Harley-Davidson V-twin engine. The cars were basically experimental cars and were probably scrapped quite soon. However the experience came in handy when the brothers started working at AB Thulinverken and participated in the development of the Thulin B.
