= Thulin FA =

1910s Swedish aircraft

Type FA
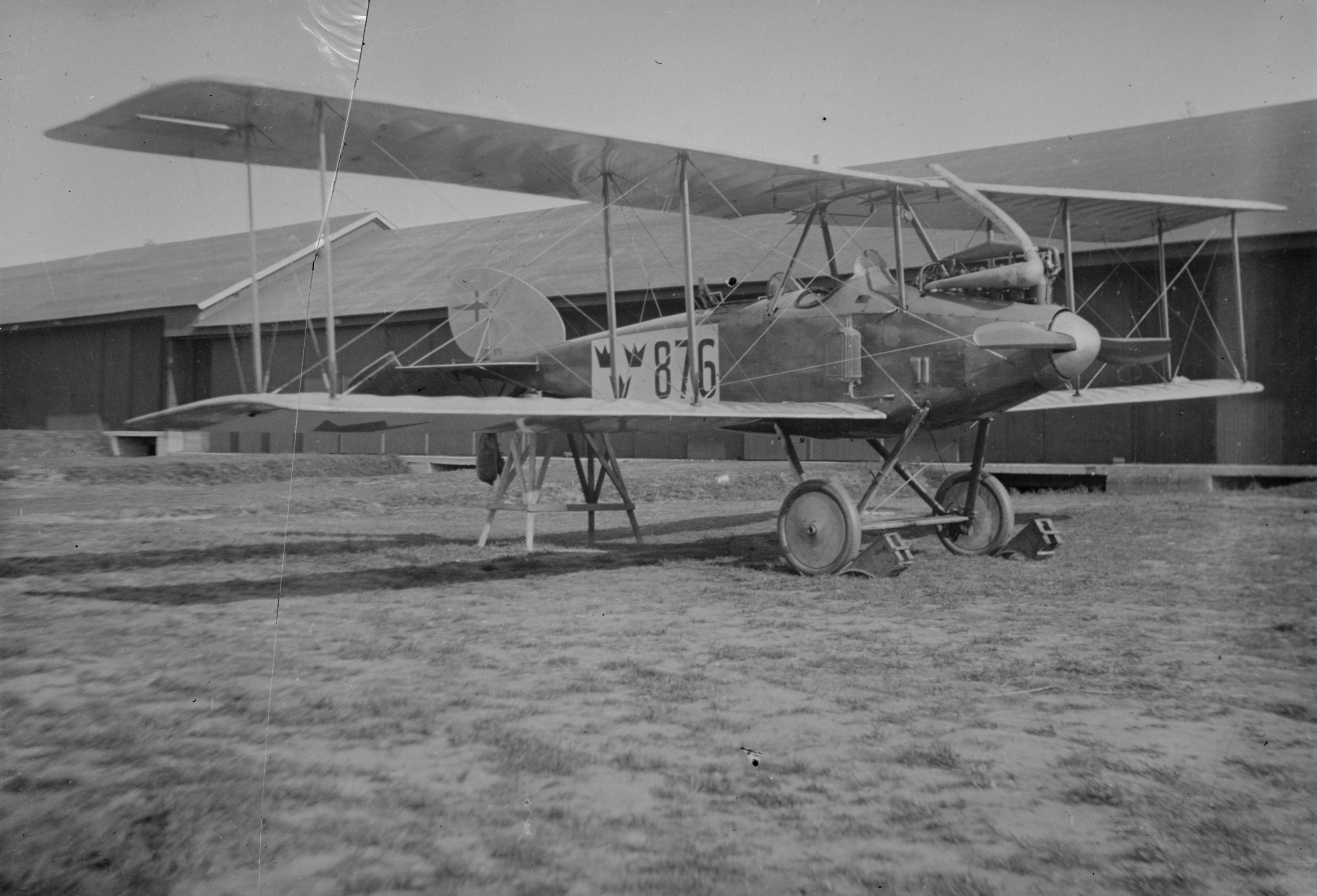

General information
- Type: Reconnaissance aircraft
- Manufacturer: AB Thulinverken
- Designer: Enoch Thulin
- Primary user: Swedish Air Force
- Number built: 8

History
- First flight: 5 August 1918

The Thulin FA was a Swedish reconnaissance aircraft built in the late 1910s.

== Design and development ==
The Thulin FA was a two-seat biplane with the lower wings mounted at the bottom of the fuselage. The upper wing was supported by four wing struts and two V-shaped supports from the fuselage. Only the upper wings were fitted with ailerons. The fuselage was provided with two open cockpits in tandem under the upper wing. The wheel ground was fixed with a spur spring under the height knob (??). The Type FA was alternatively equipped with floats for water operation.

Eight Type FA airframes were built, seven with the Benz Bz.III and the eighth with a Thulin D rotary engine. Three were destroyed in accidents by late 1919.

== Specifications ==
Data from

General characteristics

- Crew: 2
- Length: 7.2 m (23 ft 7 in)
- Wingspan: 12.8 m (42 ft 0 in)
- Height: 3.32 m (10 ft 11 in)
- Wing area: 41 m^{2} (440 sq ft)
- Gross weight: 1,595 kg (3,516 lb)
- Powerplant: 1 × Benz Bz.III six-cylinder, water-cooled, inline engine, 120 kW (160 hp)

Performance

- Maximum speed: 140 km/h (87 mph, 76 kn)
- Cruise speed: 125 km/h (78 mph, 67 kn)

Armament

- Guns: 1× 8 mm (0.315 in) Madsen machine-gun

== See also ==
Related lists

- List of military aircraft of Sweden
