= Thulin B (automobile) =

For the aircraft Thulin Type B see:Thulin B (aircraft)

Thulin B or Thulin Type B was an automobile built by AB Thulinverken.

== History ==
In 1925 Thulinverken was contacted by the brothers Per and Hugo Weiertz (who earlier had worked on the Self) who wanted them to build a car using their own blueprints. Thulinverken became interested in the project and hired the two brothers. During 1926 a prototype was constructed and tested and during 1927 the car went into production. Only 13 cars were built and none of them remain today.

== Sources ==
- https://web.archive.org/web/20070114070157/http://www2.landskrona.se/kultur/bilhistoria/pages/introb.html
