= Le Rhône =

French series of aircraft engines

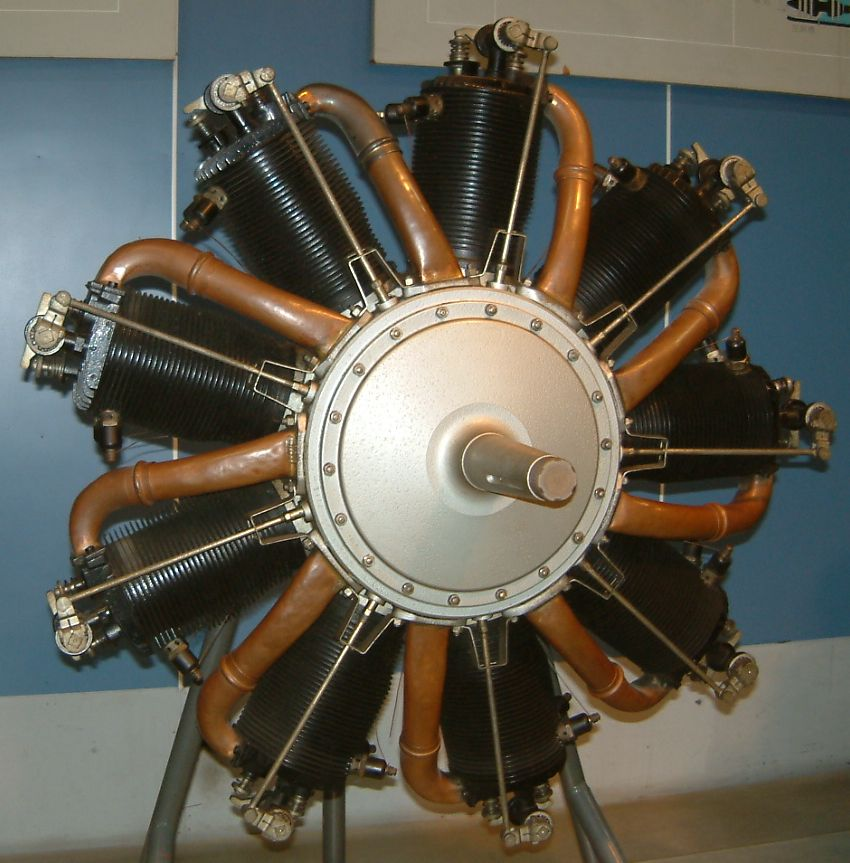
- 80 hp Le Rhône Model 9C, showing forward-mounted induction piping
- Type: Rotary engine series
- National origin: France
- Manufacturer: Gnome et Rhône
- First run: 1910

Le Rhône was the name given to a series of rotary aircraft engines built between 1910 and 1920. Le Rhône series engines were originally sold by the Société des Moteurs Le Rhône, and following a 1914 corporate buyout, by its successor company, Gnome et Rhône. During World War I, more than 22,000 nine cylinder Le Rhône engines were built, with the type far outselling Gnome et Rhône's other main wartime engine series, the Gnome Monosoupape.

Licenses for production of Le Rhône series engines were negotiated with companies in Great Britain, Austria, Italy, Russia, Sweden, and Germany. Le Rhône-designed engines powered many of the most famous WW1 aircraft, including the Sopwith Pup, the Sopwith Camel, the Nieuport 11 "Bebe" and the Fokker Dr.1 "Triplane".

== Operation ==
As with all rotary engines, the crankshaft of the Rhône remained stationary in operation, with prt of the crankcase and its attached cylinders rotating around it as a unit.

When compared with the Gnome Monosoupape, the Rhône engines were of a more conventional design with a carburetor mounted on the shaft, and intake and exhaust valves mounted on the cylinder heads. Fuel was piped from the hollow shaft to the cylinder heads by copper tubes (mounted at the front of the 80 horsepower 9C model and at the back on the 110 horsepower 9J). The use of a carburetor allowed the Rhône series engines to be throttled during flight, which greatly reduced fuel and lube oil consumption. The ability to throttle the engine was cited as the reason for the Aéronautique Militaire’s preference for the Rhône series over the 'Monosoupape.

Le Rhône engines featured cylinders with grey iron liners which could be bored out and replaced when worn allowing the cylinders to be reused. Sealing was done with piston rings only and without the use of the bronze obturator rings used on Gnome and Clerget engines.

A complicated slipper bearing system was used in the Rhône series engines. The master rod was of a split type, which employed three concentric grooves, designed to accept slipper bearings from the other cylinders. The other connecting rods used inner-end bronze shoes, which were shaped to fit in the grooves. Using this design each rod took its own thrust which removed the strain that would otherwise have been put onto the master rod.

The Rhône series engine's defining feature was an unconventional valve actuation system, with a single centrally-pivoting rocker arm moving the exhaust valve and the intake valve. When the arm moved down, it opened the intake valve and when it moved up, it opened the exhaust valve. To make this system work, a two-way push-pull rod was fitted, instead of the more conventional one-way pushrod. This feature required the cam followers to incorporate a positive action, a function designed in by using a combination of links and levers. The patented valve actuation design reduced engine vibration but it prevented valve overlap and so limited power output.

== Production ==
The first of what would become the Rhône series was a seven-cylinder rotary engine designed by the engineer Louis Verdet, while he was employed by Rossel Peugeot. In 1910, Louis Verdet founded the Société des Moteurs d’ Aviation Verdet with Pierre Berthet, however the partnership was short-lived. In 1911, Verdet joined Edouard Martin, an engineer and racing driver, and other partners to form the Société des Moteurs Le Rhône in Montreuil, Seine-Saint-Denis, Paris.

From 1911 to 1913, the Société des Moteurs Le Rhône produced a series of seven cylinder rotary engines which won many endurance trophies. In 1912 the company's first nine-cylinder engine the 80 horsepower 9C went into production followed, in 1913, by the 110 horsepower 9J model. The 9C and the 9J models would become by far the most successful of the Rhône series.

In July 1914, the Société des Moteurs Le Rhône was acquired, on very generous terms, by its main rival the Société des Moteurs Gnome forming Gnome et Rhône.

French wartime production of the Rhône series was undertaken by Gnome et Rhône at the company's Paris facilities located in Kellermann and Gennevilliers. 9,560 of the Rhône 9J and 8,700 of the 9C engines were produced in France during WW1, with a high proportion being exported. In 1915, around 45% of all Le Rhône engines manufactured in France were exported to Great Britain, Italy and Russia. Le Rhône series engines proved to be far more popular with aircraft manufacturers than Gnome et Rhône's other major engine series, the Gnome Monosoupape mainly due to the Rhône’s lower fuel and lube oil consumption.

The last of the Rhône series engines to go into production was the 9Z (or Z9), a small 60 horsepower rotary design that first ran in 1920. About fifty 9Zs were built. After the 9Z's production run was completed no more of Gnome et Rhône's engines used the Le Rhône badge.

=== Production outside of France ===
The British licensee for the Rhône engines was the Peter Hooker company. During WW1 thousands of 9Cs and 9Js were built by British firms including W.H Allen, F.W Berwick and Daimler.

Prewar production of the 9C was undertaken in Austria by Steyr Werke and by Mercedes-Benz and Siemens in Germany. In 1916 the German firm Motorenfabrik Oberursel started producing the 9J model as the UR.II.

In Sweden, 9C and 11F Le Rhône series engines were manufactured by AB Thulinverken as the Thulin A and Thulin G respectively.

In the United States, the Rhône 9C was manufactured by Union Switch and Signal Company of Pennsylvania. 1,057 American-built 9C engines were completed by the end of WW1. In the 1920s, hundreds of these now surplus engines were acquired by a Texas based company, which converted them into 120 horsepower (89 kW) radial engines that were subsequently marketed as the Super Rhone.

Le Rhône engines were produced in Gnome et Rhône's own factory in Italy until 1915, when the business was acquired by a Turin based consortium, after which licensed production continued.

Le Rhône engines were assembled at Gnome et Rhône's factory in Moscow until 1917, when the entire facility was seized by its workers during the revolution.

== Variants ==
Data from :

Le Rhône used just two different cylinder sizes in the majority of their production engines. The earlier motors starting from 1910, of which the 9C was the most numerous, had a bore & stroke of 105 x 140 mm; this size was used in 7, 9, 11, 14 and 18 cylinder engines. The later 9J series produced from 1913 (all with nine cylinders) used 112 x 170 mm. The 9R and 18R were slightly bored out to 115 x 170mm.

=== Production engines ===
Le Rhône 7A
(1910) 50 hp (37 kW), seven-cylinder rotary engine — twenty built for use on Borel Monoplanes and Sommer Biplanes.
Le Rhône 7B
(1911) 50 hp (37 kW), seven-cylinder rotary engine of 8.48 litres — Thirty-five prototype engines built.
Le Rhône 7B2
(1912) 60 hp (45 kW), seven-cylinder rotary engine — 350 built at Societe Moteurs le Rhône.
Le Rhône Type 9C

(1912) 80 hp (60 kW), nine-cylinder rotary engine, 10.9 litres. Also known as the Rhône 80 Horsepower, the 9C was widely used in both French and foreign aircraft with more than 10,000 engines produced by Gnome et Rhône and a variety of licensed manufacturers.
Le Rhône 11F
(1913) A 100 hp (75 kW) 11-cylinder rotary. 50 built.
Le Rhône 14D
(1913) A 120 hp (89 kW) two-row rotary of 19.96 litres, consisting of two seven-cylinder rows rotating around a single two-throw crankshaft. Not accepted by French military aviation authorities.
Le Rhône 18E
(1913) 160 hp (120 kW) two-row rotary displacing 21.8 litres, consisting of two nine-cylinder rows rotating around a single two-throw crankshaft. Not homologated by French authorities until 1917. Not to be confused with the prototype 18E engine made in 1917.
Le Rhône Type 9J

(1913) 110 hp (82 kW), nine-cylinder rotary engine. Also known as the Rhône 110 Horsepower, the 9J was widely used in both French and foreign aircraft with approx 12,000 engines produced by Gnome et Rhône and a variety of foreign manufacturers.

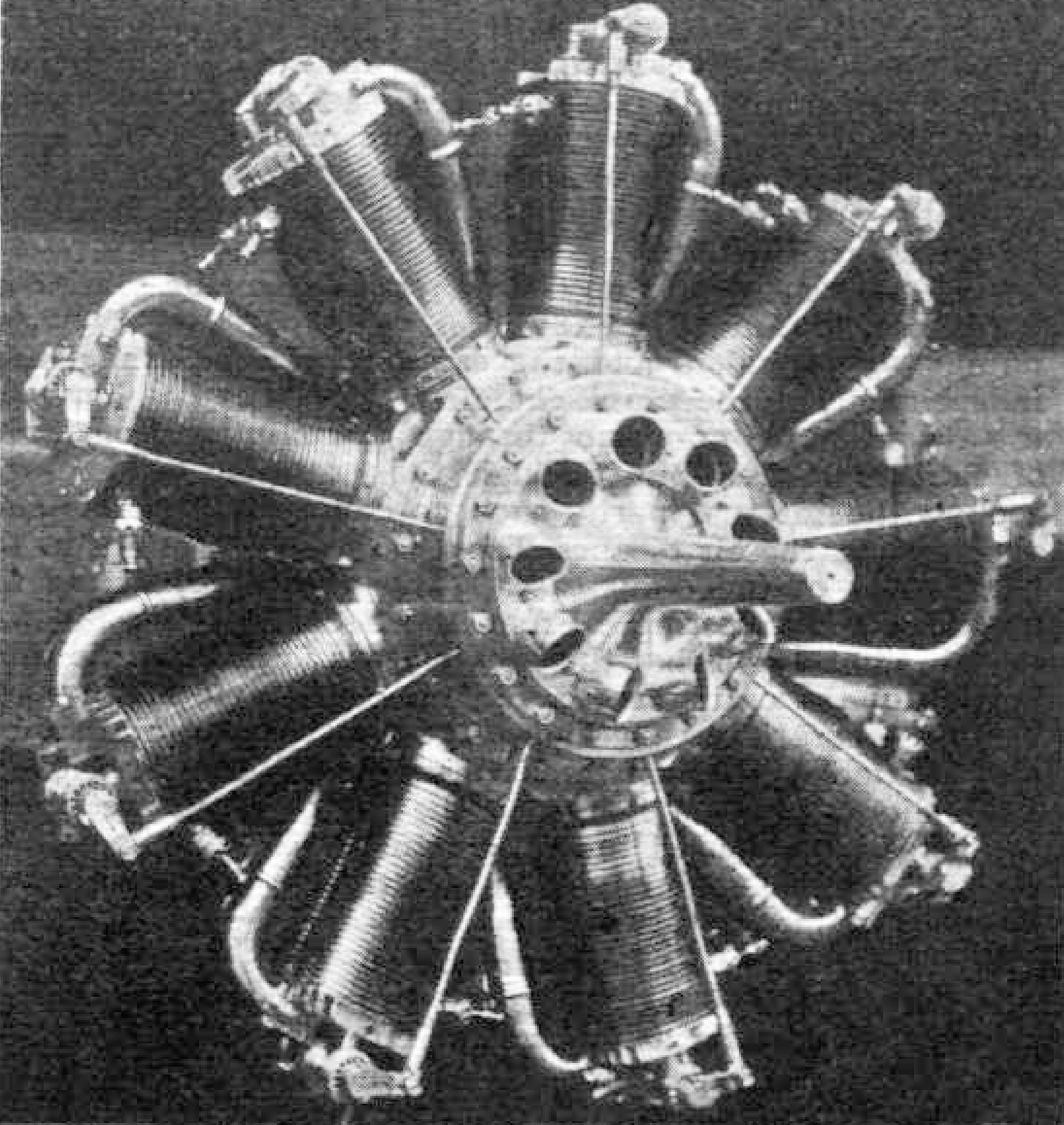
The 170hp 9R

Le Rhône 9R
(1916) 170 hp (127 kW) / 180 hp (134 kW) 9-cylinder rotary with two spark plugs per cylinder. 250 built under license in Great Britain.
Le Rhône M
(1917) A 9-cylinder rotary engine produced in small quantities.

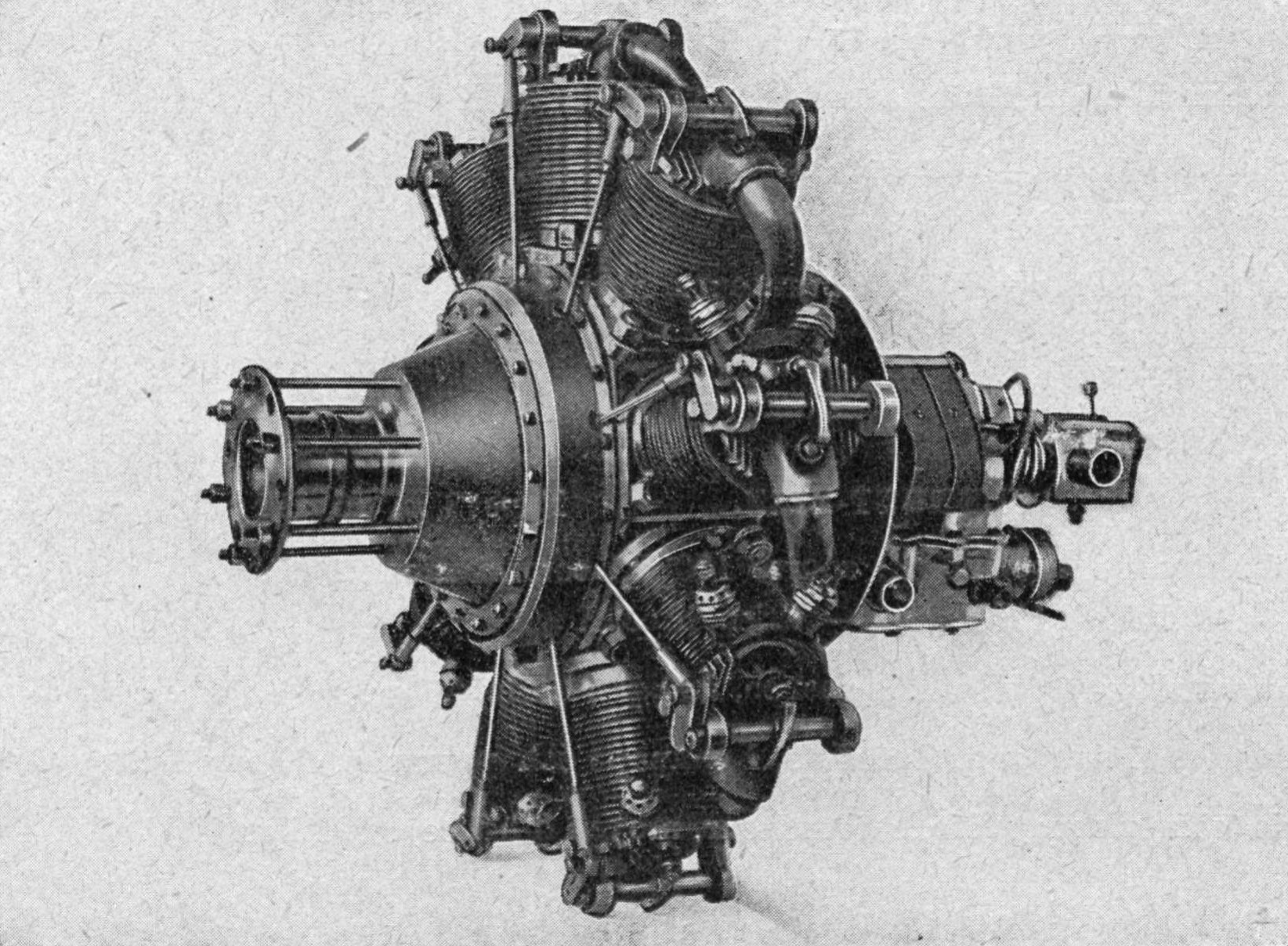
Le Rhône 9Z developing 60 hp

Le Rhône 9Z
(1920) A 60 hp (45 kW) 9-cylinder rotary with two spark plugs per cylinder. Bore & stroke 84 x 106 mm. 50 built

=== Prototypes ===
Le Rhône K
(1916) A 9-cylinder rotary prototype engine.
Le Rhône L
(1916) A 9-cylinder rotary prototype engine.
Le Rhône P
(1917) A 9-cylinder rotary prototype engine with 3 valves per cylinder, 2 inlet and 1 exhaust.
Le Rhône 18E
(1917) A 340 hp (250 kW) two-row rotary, consisting of two 9R rows rotating round a single two-throw crankshaft. Prototype only.
Le Rhône 28E
(1918) A 320 hp (240 kW) four-row rotary, consisting of four seven-cylinder rows (bore & stroke 115 x 140 mm) rotating around a single four-throw crankshaft.

=== Foreign copies ===
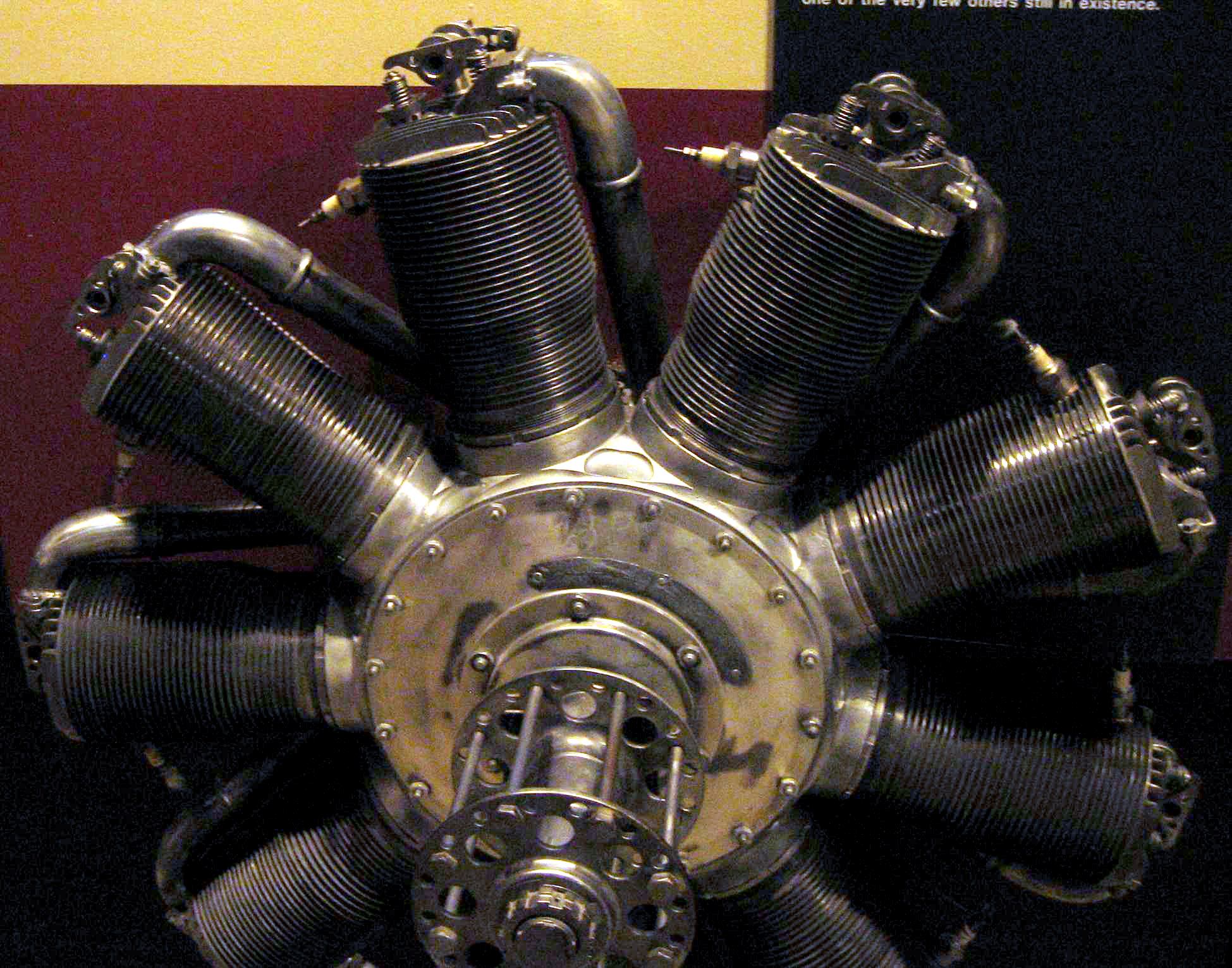
Oberursel UR.II, a clone of the Le Rhône 9J

Thulin A
A licensed copy of the Le Rhône 9C built in Sweden by AB Thulinverken
Thulin G
A licensed copy of the Le Rhône 11F built in Sweden by AB Thulinverken
Oberursel UR.II
A licensed copy of the Le Rhône 9J built in Germany by Motorenfabrik Oberursel
Oberursel UR.III
A licensed copy of the Le Rhône 11F built in Germany by Motorenfabrik Oberursel

=== Conversions ===
Super Rhone
(1925) Radial conversion of surplus, American built, 9C engines

== Le Rhônes flying today ==
Several enthusiasts are using original Le Rhône engines for World War I replica aircraft today. A flying example can be seen at the Pioneer Flight Museum, Kingsbury Texas in a replica Fokker Dr 1. pioneerflightmuseum.org The engine had previously been flown in an original Thomas Morse Scout, which is now under restoration with another Le Rhône 80 hp engine planned for that flying aircraft. There are other reproductions of Dr 1's flying original Le Rhône engines, as well as the restored Thomas Morse Scouts in the United States.

== Applications ==
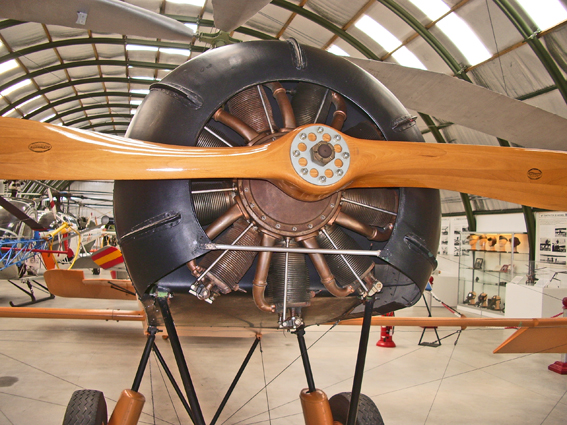
Le Rhône 9J mounted in the front of a Cierva C.6 autogyro replica, displayed in "Museo del Aire", Cuatro Vientos, Madrid, Spain

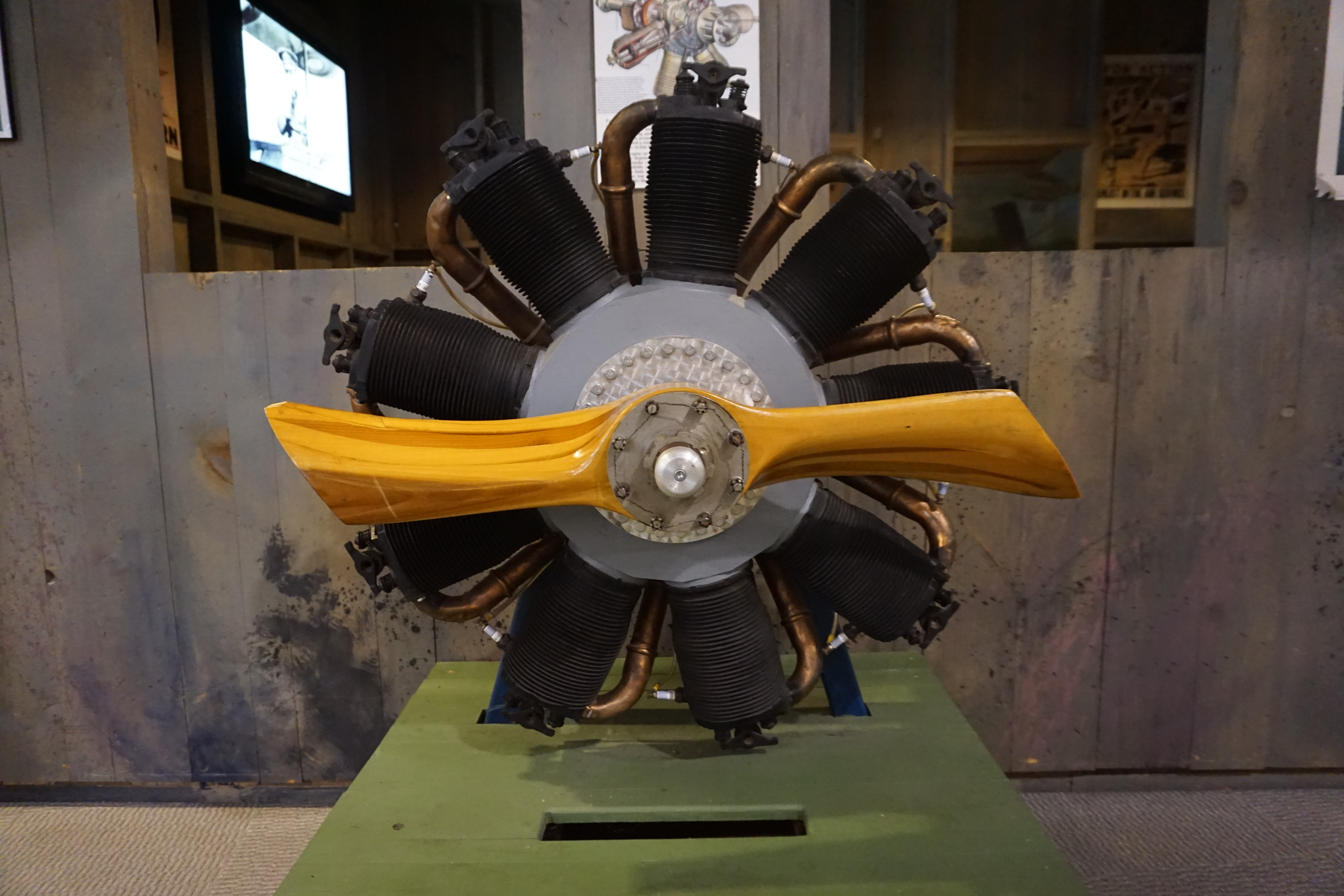
A Le Rhône radial engine on display at the Frontiers of Flight Museum

- Adamoli-Cattani fighter
- Airco DH.5
- Avro 504
- Beardmore W.B.III
- Bristol M.1
- Bristol Scout
- Caudron C.27
- Caudron G.3
- Caudron G.4
- Cierva C.6 (autogyro)
- Fokker D.VI
- Fokker D.VIII
- Fokker Dr.I
- Hanriot HD.1
- Hanriot HD.14
- Macchi M.14
- Morane-Saulnier N
- Morane-Saulnier BB
- Morane-Saulnier AI (trainers)
- Mosca MB 2 bis
- Nielsen & Winther Type AA
- Nieuport 10
- Nieuport 11 and 16
- Nieuport 17, 21 and 23
- Nieuport 24, 24bis and 27
- Nieuport 31
- Nieuport 80, 81 and 83
- Sikorsky S-16
- Sopwith Camel
- Sopwith Pup
- SPAD S.A.2 and 4
- Spijker V.1
- Spijker V.2
- Standard E-1
- Thomas-Morse S-4C
- Thulin E
- TNCA Serie E Sonora, Tololoche, and México

== See also ==
- Clerget aircraft engines
- Gnome Monosoupape
- Gnome et Rhône
- Motorenfabrik Oberursel
