= Mosca-Bystritsky MBbis =

General information
- Type: monoplane fighter
- National origin: Imperial Russia
- Manufacturer: Mosca-Bystritsky
- Designer: Francesco E. Mosca & Bystritsky
- Primary user: Imperial Russian Air Service
- Number built: 50

History
- Manufactured: 1916–1918
- First flight: 1916
- Developed from: Mosca-Bystritsky MBbis

The Mosca-Bystritsky MBbis was a fighter aircraft developed and used by the Imperial Russian Air Service during the First World War.

== Design and development ==
After being persuaded to move to Russia, the Italian aircraft designer Francesco E. Mosca worked at the Duks factory, with Bezobrasov, Lerkhe and Yankovski. Mosca also designed a two-seat reconnaissance monoplane similar to contemporary Morane and Nieuport monoplanes which went into production as the Mosca-Bystritsky MB. A smaller single seat version of the MB was also produced as the MBbis, 50 of which were ordered from 1916.

== Description ==
The MB and MBbis were both constructed largely of wood with fabric covering. The wings were mounted in the shoulder position with gaps between the roots and the fuselage, allowing easy access to the cockpit and improved view for the pilot, (pilot and observer). For transport on the ground the wings could be folded to lie along the fuselage sides and the tail-planes folded forward and upwards.

Powered by 80 hp (60 kW) Le Rhone 9C or Clerget 7Z engines the MBbis was armed with a single machine gun mounted, either in a fixed forward firing mount firing through the propeller fitted with deflector plates, or in angled or elevated mounts firing outside the propeller disc.

== Operators ==
Russian Empire
Imperial Russian Air Service

== Specifications (MBbis) ==
Data from

General characteristics

- Crew: 1
- Length: 6.1 m (20 ft 0 in)
- Wingspan: 7.9 m (25 ft 11 in)
- Wing area: 12 m^{2} (130 sq ft)
- Empty weight: 322 kg (710 lb)
- Gross weight: 487 kg (1,074 lb)
- Powerplant: 1 × Le Rhône 9C 9-cylinder air-cooled rotary piston engine, 60 kW (80 hp)

Performance

- Maximum speed: 130 km/h (81 mph, 70 kn)
- Range: 300 km (190 mi, 160 nmi)
- Service ceiling: 3,200 m (10,500 ft)
- Time to altitude: 2,000 m in 10 minutes
- Wing loading: 40.0 kg/m^{2} (8.2 lb/sq ft)
- Power/mass: 0.16 hp/kg

Armament
1x machine gun
