= Adamoli-Cattani fighter =

Prototype fighter aircraft of Italy

General information
- Type: Fighter
- National origin: Italy
- Manufacturer: Farina and Officine Moncenisio
- Designer: Signori Adamoli & Cattani
- Number built: 1

History
- First flight: 1918

The Adamoli-Cattani fighter was a prototype fighter aircraft designed as a private venture by two Italian aircraft builders in 1918.

== Design and development ==
The Adamoli-Cattani was intended to be the smallest practical biplane around the most powerful engine available to them, a 149 kW (200 hp) le Rhône M. The result was a reasonably conventional design, other than that the wings featured hinged leading edges in place of conventional ailerons. The Farina Coach Building factory in Turin began construction of the prototype; the Officine Moncenisio in Condove completed it.

== Operational history ==
Upon completion, ground testing revealed that the engine as installed could only deliver some 80% of its rated power, thus leaving the aircraft significantly underpowered. Limited tests continued until the end of World War I, when the Armistice made further development superfluous.

== Specifications (estimated performance with 200hp engine) ==
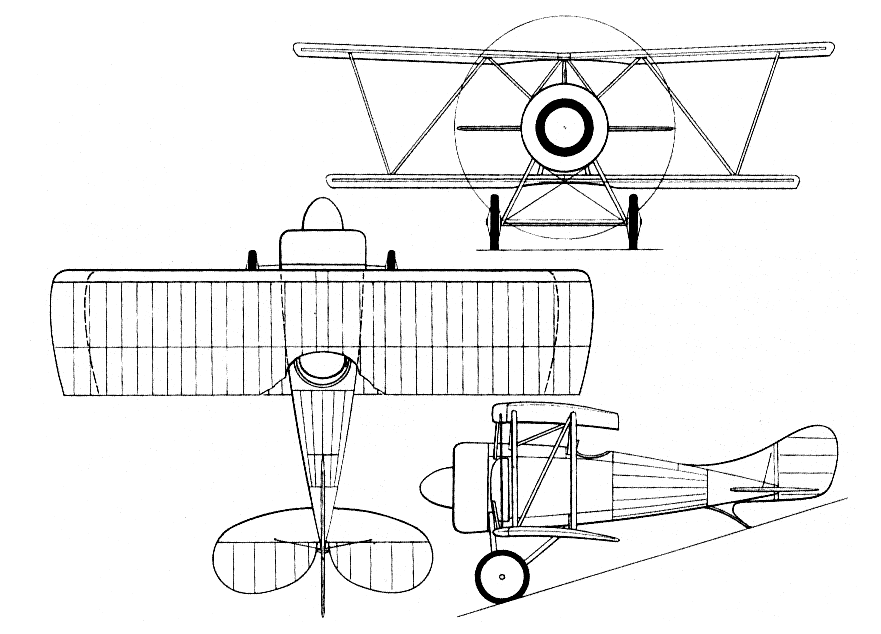
Three-view diagram

Data from The Complete Book of Fighters

General characteristics

- Crew: 1
- Length: 6.10 m (20 ft 0 in)
- Wingspan: 8.60 m (28 ft 3 in)
- Empty weight: 470 kg (1,036 lb)
- Gross weight: 675 kg (1,488 lb)
- Powerplant: 1 × le Rhône M 9-cyl. air-cooled rotary piston engine, 150 kW (200 hp) (rating) - actual power 119 kW (160 hp)

Performance

- Maximum speed: 186 km/h (116 mph, 100 kn)
- Endurance: 2.25

Armament

- Guns: 2 x .303-in (7.7-mm) machine guns

== See also ==
Comparable aircraft:

- Nieuport-Delage Ni-D 29
