= Thulinverken =

Swedish aircraft company

- Formerly: Enoch Thulins Aeroplanfabrik (1914–1922)
- Industry: Aerospace; Automotive (1920–1928)
- Founded: 1914; 112 years ago
- Founder: Enoch Thulin
- Defunct: 1958
- Fate: Merged with Svenska AB Bromsregulator
- Headquarters: Landskrona, Sweden

AB Thulinverken was a company in Landskrona, Sweden, founded in 1914 as Enoch Thulins Aeroplanfabrik by the airman and aircraft designer Dr. Enoch Thulin. The company became Sweden's first aircraft manufacturer. In 1920, Thulin also started manufacturing automobiles, which continued until 1928. During World War I, the company came into financial difficulties and was reconstructed in 1922 as AB Thulinverken. The manufacturing of brake systems became a main focus of the company. In 1958, Thulinverken merged with Svenska AB Bromsregulator (founded in 1913). The remains of Thulinverken are now a part of SAB Wabco AB, which is owned by the French Faiveley Transport company since 2004.

== Products ==
=== Aircraft ===
Aircraft made by AB Thulinverken
| Model | Description | Engine | Notes |
|---|---|---|---|
| Thulin A | Monoplane – licence-built Bleriot XI | Gnome Omega 50 hp (37 kW) (Note: The Thulin A's Gnome Omega was sometimes described as a Thulin engine. Although Thulin built Le Rhônes under licence, it is unlikely that Thulin built Gnomes since he didn't use the Omega on any other aircraft and it was outdated when he started making engines.) | |
| Thulin B | Monoplane – licence-built Morane-Saulnier G | Thulin A 80 hp (60 kW) | |
| Thulin C | Biplane – licence-built Albatros B.II | Benz Bz.II (or Benz Bz.III) | |
| Thulin D | Monoplane – licence-built Morane-Saulnier L | Thulin A (Le Rhône 9C) 80 hp (60 kW) | |
| Thulin E | Biplane – own design | Thulin A 80 hp (60 kW) | |
| Thulin FA | Biplane – own design | Benz Bz.III or Mercedes | Development of Thulin C |
| Thulin G | Biplane floatplane – licence-built Albatros B.II | Benz Bz.III 160 hp (120 kW) | Development of Thulin C/Albatros B.II for Navy |
| Thulin GA | Biplane | Curtiss V-2 200 hp (150 kW) or Benz | Development of Thulin G with alternative powerplants |
| Thulin H | Biplane trimotor bomber – own design | 3 x Thulin A 240 hp (180 kW) | One tractor engine and 2 pusher engines in nacelles |
| Thulin K | Monoplane – own design | Thulin A (Le Rhône 9C) 100 hp (75 kW) | Development of Thulin B with ailerons |
| Thulin L | Biplane – own design | Thulin A 80 hp (60 kW) | Development of Thulin E with double bearing engine mount |
| Thulin LA | Biplane – own design | Thulin G 100 hp (75 kW) | Variant of L with horseshoe cowling |
| Thulin M | Biplane | Thulin A | Single-seat fighter, 6 built by the Danish firm of Nielsen & Winther as Type Aa. First flew in January 1917. |
| Thulin N | Biplane – own design | Thulin G 100 hp (75 kW) | Fighter |
| Thulin NA | Biplane – own design | Thulin G 100 hp (75 kW) | Floatplane fighter based on N |

=== Aircraft engines ===
- Thulin A (air-cooled, 9-cylinder, 80 hp Le Rhône 9C rotary engine, bore x stroke 105 mm x 140 mm) (Note: The Le Rhône 9C and 11F engines were manufactured under a licence acquired by Enoch Thulin from Gnome et Rhône in 1915. They were both derived by Le Rhône from Verdet's original 7-cylinder 50 hp model 7A, with the same piston dimensions. Thulin licence-built engines apparently have a greater power output than the original manufacturer claimed, e.g. the 80 hp Le Rhône 9C mysteriously becomes the "90 hp Thulin A".)
- Thulin D (possibly a double-row 9C)
- Thulin E (probably a copy of the water-cooled, 6-cylinder 110 hp Mercedes D.II. Also manufactured by Scania-Vabis. (Note: The Scania-Vabis 110 hp appears to have been a copy of the Mercedes D.II. An example of the latest Albatros B.IIa was being flown around northern Europe on a sales tour by the manufacturers just before WWI began, and the propeller and landing gear were damaged on landing in Sweden in July 1914. This version used a Mercedes D.II engine, developing around 110–120 hp, with a bore and stroke of 125 x 150 mm. Around 45 copies of the Albatros were made in Sweden during the war, and the engine was also reproduced as the 110 hp Scania-Vabis PD. See also photos of the Scania-Vabis PD 100 hp engine installed in Swedish aircraft: Confusingly, a number of other German aero engines have been variously cited as the basis of this motor, including the Mercedes D.I of 100 hp, the Benz Bz.III of 150 hp, and the Mercedes D.III of 160 hp: but only the Mercedes D.II has a comparable power output to the Scania-Vabis motor.)
- Thulin G (air-cooled, 11-cylinder, 100 hp Le Rhône 11F rotary, bore x stroke 105 mm x 140 mm)

=== Automobiles ===
- Thulin A
- Thulin B

=== Motorcycles ===
- Thulin MC I
- Thulin MC II
- Thulin MC II

== See also ==
- List of Swedish aircraft
