= Thulin A (automobile) =

1920s automobile

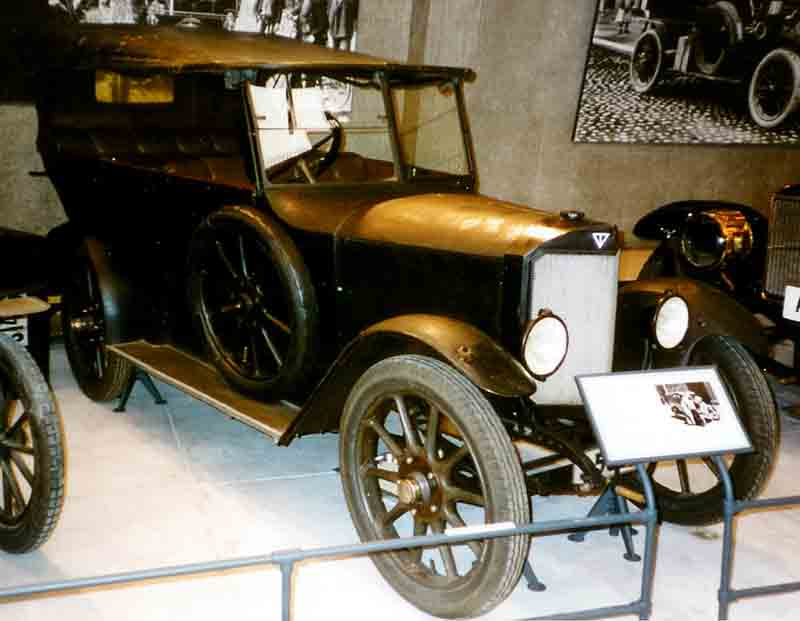
Thulin A25 Phaeton 1923

For the aircraft see: Thulin A (aircraft)

Thulin A was an automobile made by Enoch Thulins Aeroplanfabrik between 1920 and 1925. They were manufactured in a Thulinfactory in Landskrona, Sweden.

== Gallery ==
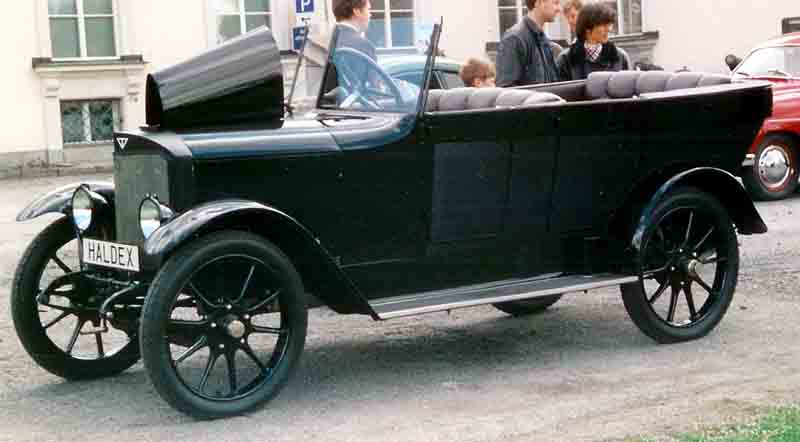
Thulin A20 Phaeton 1920

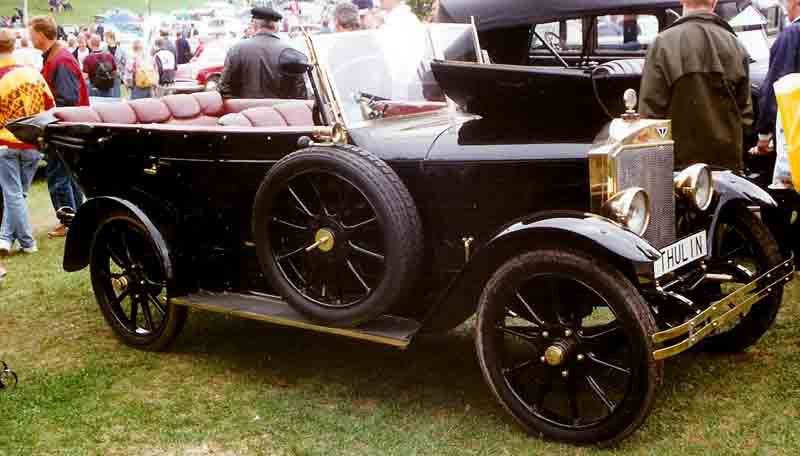
Thulin A25 Phaeton 1923

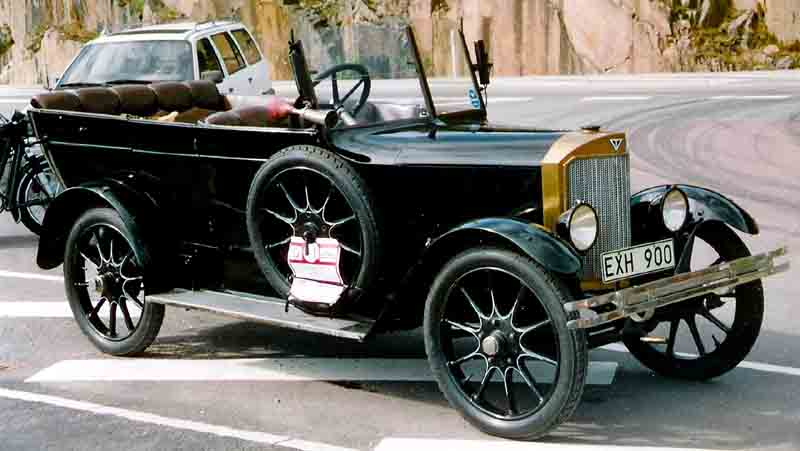
Thulin A25 Phaeton 1925
