= Simris =

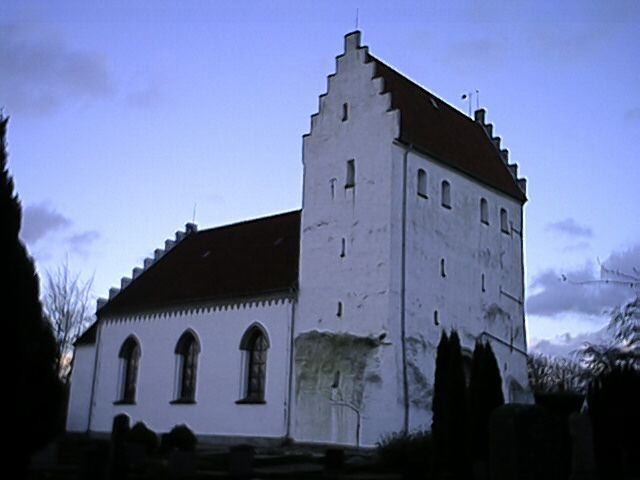
- Simris church

- Location within Skåne Location within Sweden
- Coordinates: 55°32′N 14°20′E
- Country: Sweden
- Province: Skåne
- County: Skåne County
- Municipality: Simrishamn Municipality

Area
  - Total: 0.26 km^{2} (0.10 sq mi)

Population (31 December 2010)
  - Total: 211
  - Density: 805/km^{2} (2,080/sq mi)
- Time zone: UTC+1 (CET)
  - Summer (DST): UTC+2 (CEST)
- Website: http://www.simris.se

Simris is a locality situated in Simrishamn Municipality, Skåne County, Sweden, with 211 inhabitants in 2010.
