= Thulin E (aircraft) =

1910s Swedish aircraft

Type E
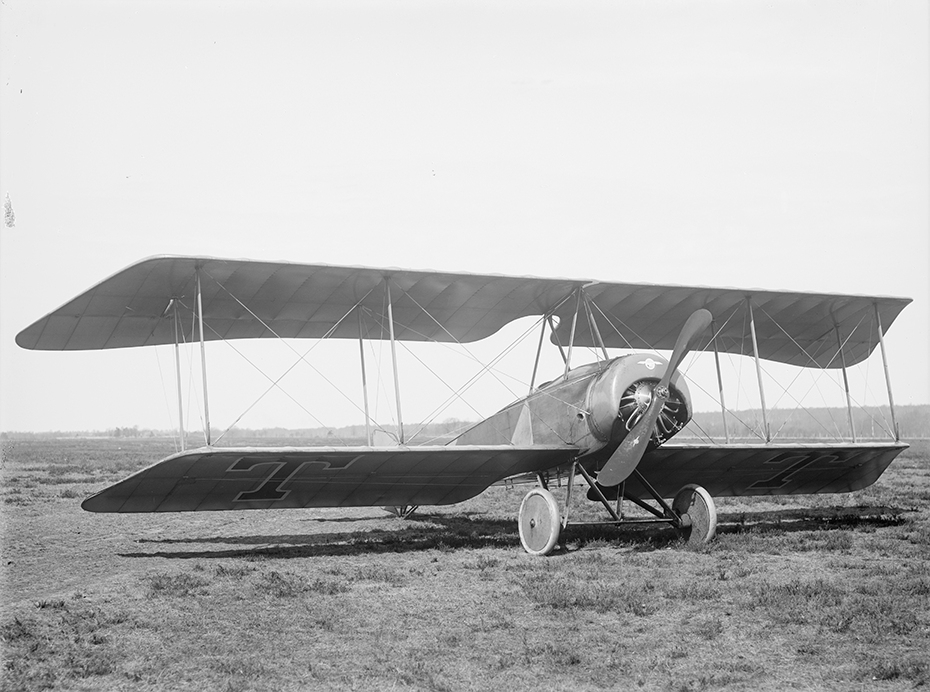

General information
- Type: Reconnaissance aircraft
- Manufacturer: AB Thulinverken
- Designer: Enoch Thulin
- Primary user: Swedish Air Force
- Number built: 5

History
- First flight: 1916

The Thulin E was a Swedish reconnaissance aircraft built in the late 1910s.

== Design and development ==
The Thulin E was the first indigenous design conceived by Enoch Thulin's company. It was a two-seat biplane with the lower wings mounted at the bottom of the fuselage. The upper wing was supported by four wing struts and four V-shaped fuselage struts. Only the upper wings were fitted with ailerons. The fuselage was provided with two open cockpits, in tandem, under the upper wing. The rear landing gear was a fixed spur spring. An attempt was made to equip the biplane with floats.

== Specifications ==
Data from

General characteristics

- Crew: 2
- Length: 6.45 m (21 ft 2 in)
- Wingspan: 11.4 m (37 ft 5 in)
- Height: 2.96 m (9 ft 9 in)
- Gross weight: 655 kg (1,444 lb)
- Powerplant: 1 × Thulin A nine-cylinder air-cooled rotary aircraft engine, 67 kW (90 hp)
- Propellers: 2-bladed fixed pitch propeller

Performance

- Maximum speed: 110 km/h (68 mph, 59 kn)
- Cruise speed: 80 km/h (50 mph, 43 kn)

== See also ==
Related lists

- List of military aircraft of Sweden
