= Thulin G =

1910s Swedish aircraft

Type G
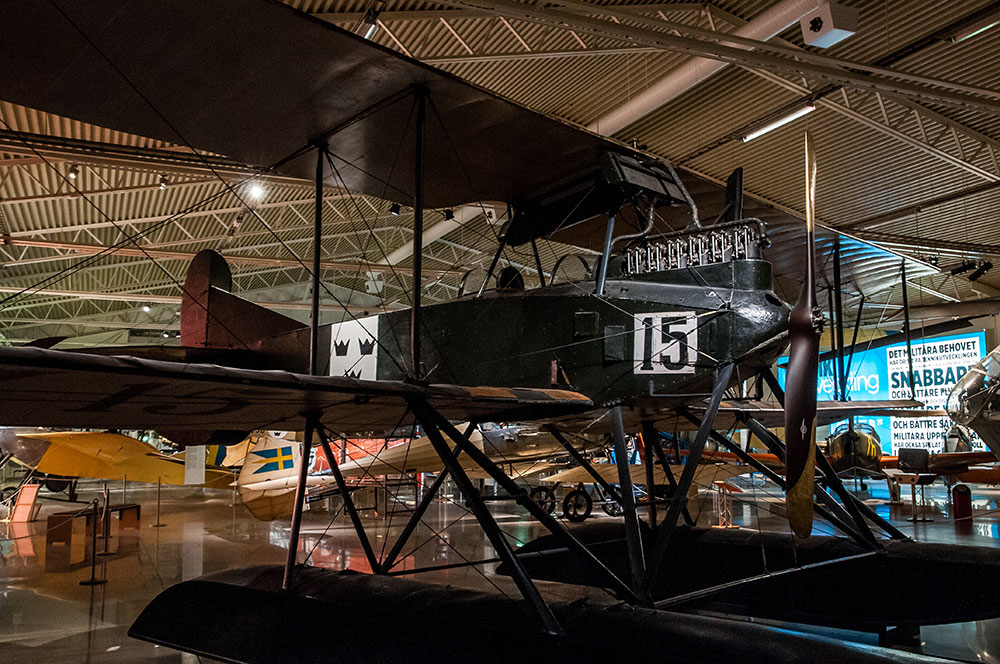
- Thulin G on display at the Flygvapenmuseum

General information
- Type: Reconnaissance aircraft
- Manufacturer: AB Thulinverken
- Primary user: Swedish Navy
- Number built: 7

History
- Introduction date: 1917
- First flight: 11 July 1917
- Retired: 1922

The Thulin G was a Swedish military reconnaissance aircraft built in the late 1910s.

== Design and development ==
The Thulin G was a two-seat biplane of conventional configuration derived from the Albatros B.II that seated the observer and the pilot in separate cockpits in tandem. The upper wing was supported by 12 struts from the underwing and four supports from the fuselage. The inline engine was mounted in the aircraft's nose where it drove a wooden propeller . The exhaust gases from the engine were led via a manifold to pass above the upper wing. The pilot was seated in the front cockpit which was placed under the wing while the observer was seated in a cockpit behind the wings to allow good visibility to the sides. The Type G used floats for takeoff and landing on water.

== Operational history ==
Five Type G and two Type GA aircraft were built for the Swedish naval air force, serving from 1917-1922. All but two aircraft were lost in accidents or destroyed in hangar fires.

== Operators ==
Sweden

- Swedish Navy

== Variants ==
Thulin G
powered by a Benz Bz.III engine
Thulin GA
powered by Curtiss engine

== Specifications (Type G) ==
Data from

General characteristics

- Crew: 2
- Length: 9.4 m (30 ft 10 in)
- Wingspan: 17.2 m (56 ft 5 in)
- Empty weight: 1,538 kg (3,391 lb)
- Powerplant: 1 × Benz Bz.III 6-cylinder water-cooled in-line piston engine, 110 kW (150 hp)

Performance

- Maximum speed: 118 km/h (73 mph, 64 kn)

== See also ==
Related lists

- List of military aircraft of Sweden
