= Morane-Saulnier G =

Sport aircraft family

Type G
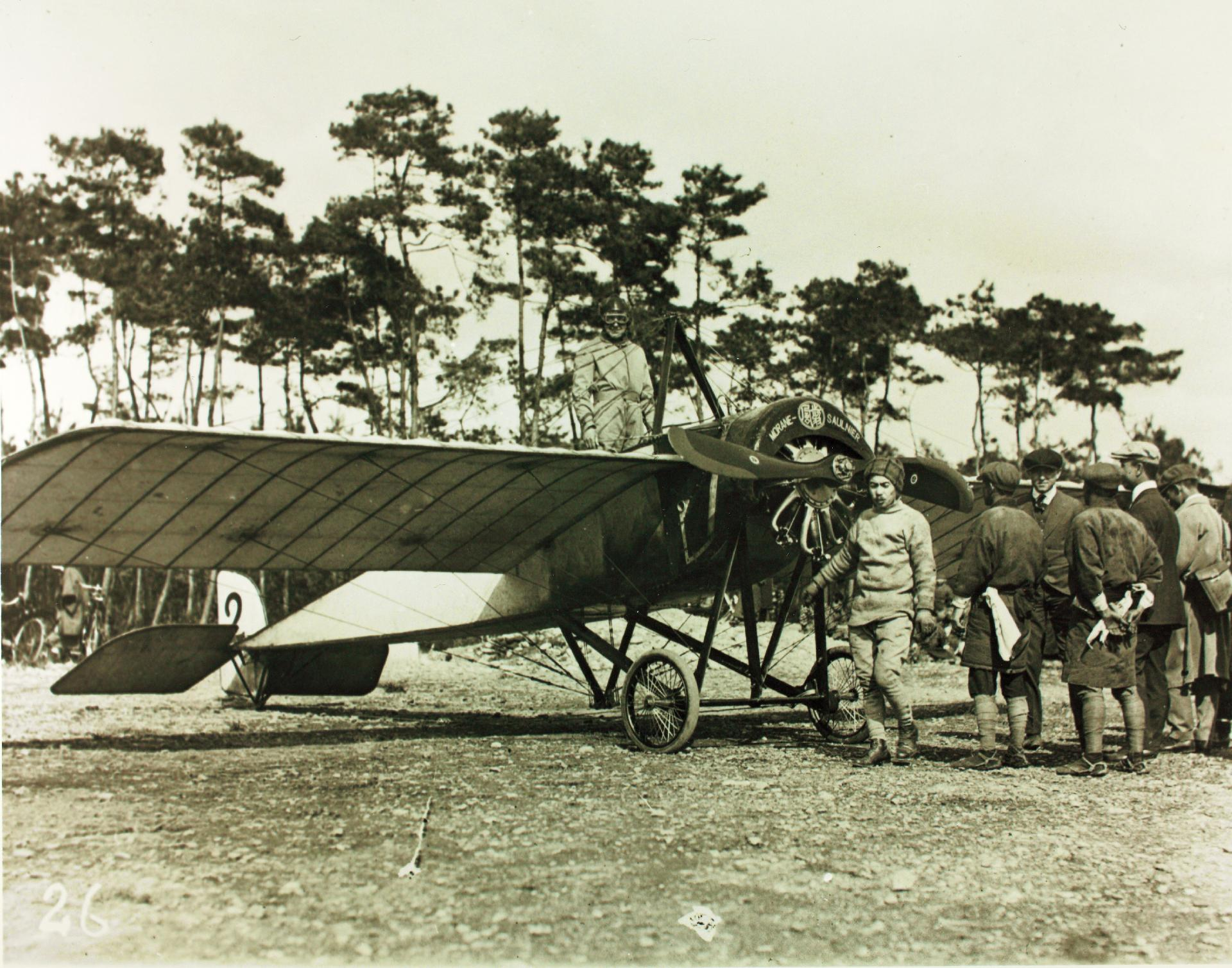

General information
- Type: Sport aircraft
- Manufacturer: Morane-Saulnier

History
- First flight: 1912

The Morane-Saulnier G was a two-seat sport and racing monoplane produced in France before the First World War. It was a development of the racing monoplanes designed by Léon Morane and Raymond Saulnier after leaving Borel and, like its predecessors, was a wire-braced, shoulder-wing monoplane. Construction was of fabric-covered wood throughout, except for the undercarriage struts which were of steel tube.

The type was a sporting success. In April 1913, Roland Garros took second place in the inaugural Schneider Cup in a floatplane version, finishing with a time of 40 minutes 40 seconds. On 26 June, Claude Grahame-White flew another float-equipped example from Paris to London via Le Havre, Boulogne-sur-Mer, and Dover, covering some 500 km (310 mi) that day. Between 21 and 28 September the same year, two float-equipped Type Gs competed at the seaplane meeting at San Sebastián, with Lord Carbery winning the short takeoff prize on one, and Edmond Audemars winning the maneuverability prize on the other. The following week, Carbery flew his Type G in the Italian Waterplane Contest from Lake Como to Pavia and back, along with two other Type Gs in the field of fifteen competitors, these flown by Garros and Morane. Garros not only won the Grand Prize in the "general class", but also the prizes for best speed (127.7 km/h, 79.8 mph) and greatest altitude (2,100 m, 6,000 ft).

On 28 September 1913 Roland Garros became the first person to cross the Mediterranean Sea by air, flying from Fréjus in the south of France to Bizerte in Tunisia in a Morane-Saulnier G.

In 1914, Russian manufacturer Duks arranged to build the type under licence at their Moscow factory for the Russian Army, and the same year, the Turkish military ordered 40 examples. Before these could be delivered, however, war broke out, and the aircraft were impressed into the French Army. To these, the Army soon added an order of 94 aircraft, and the British Royal Flying Corps also acquired a number, these latter machines purchased from Grahame-White, who was manufacturing the type in the UK under licence. At the outbreak of war, the type's military value was found to be wanting, and the French machines were quickly relegated to training duties.

Despite this, a dedicated single-seat fighter version was built in 1915, armed with an 8 mm Hotchkiss machine gun that fired through the propeller arc, the propeller blades being protected by deflector plates. Only one or two prototypes were built, and the type never entered service.

Some Type Gs were modified by Morane-Saulnier to have their wings mounted above the fuselage, parasol-fashion, rather than at the fuselage sides. This arrangement was found to offer far better visibility for the pilot, and formed the basis for the Morane-Saulnier L.

A Type G is preserved at the Museo del Aire (Madrid) (Museo del Aire de Cuatrovientos).

== Variants ==
Type GA
version with 40 kW (60 hp) Le Rhône engine
Type GB
version with 60 kW (80 hp) Gnome engine
Type WB
version for export to Russia with glazed forward fuselage
MoS-2
official French government STAe designation for the G
Thulin B
Licence-built by AB Thulinverken in Sweden
Grahame-White Type XIV
License built by Claude Grahame-White in the United Kingdom

Various versions were given the STAé designation MoS-2, MoS-14 (GB), MoS-15 (GB), MoS-17 (G), MoS-18 (G) and MoS-19 (GA).

== Operators ==
Argentina

- Argentine Air Force

Cuba

- Cuban Air Force - One aircraft.

France

- Aéronautique Militaire (94 ordered, plus 40 impounded from Turkish order)
- French Navy

Russia

- Imperial Russian Air Force

Soviet Union

- Soviet Air Force - Taken over from the Imperial Russian Air Force.

Spain

- Spanish Air Force

Turkey

- Ottoman Air Force - 40 ordered, but never delivered.

United Kingdom

- Royal Flying Corps - one acquired at start of First World War.

== Specifications (GB) ==
Data from Jane's Fighting Aircraft of World War I, p. 116

General characteristics

- Crew: one pilot
- Capacity: one passenger
- Length: 6.30 m (20 ft 8 in)
- Wingspan: 9.20 m (30 ft 2 in)
- Wing area: 16 m^{2} (172 sq ft)
- Empty weight: 95 kg (208 lb)
- Gross weight: 370 kg (815 lb)
- Powerplant: 1 × Gnome , 60 kW (80 hp)

Performance

- Maximum speed: 123 km/h (76 mph, 66 kn)
- Rate of climb: 1.8 m/s (345 ft/min)
