= Albatros B.II =

Type of aircraft

B.II
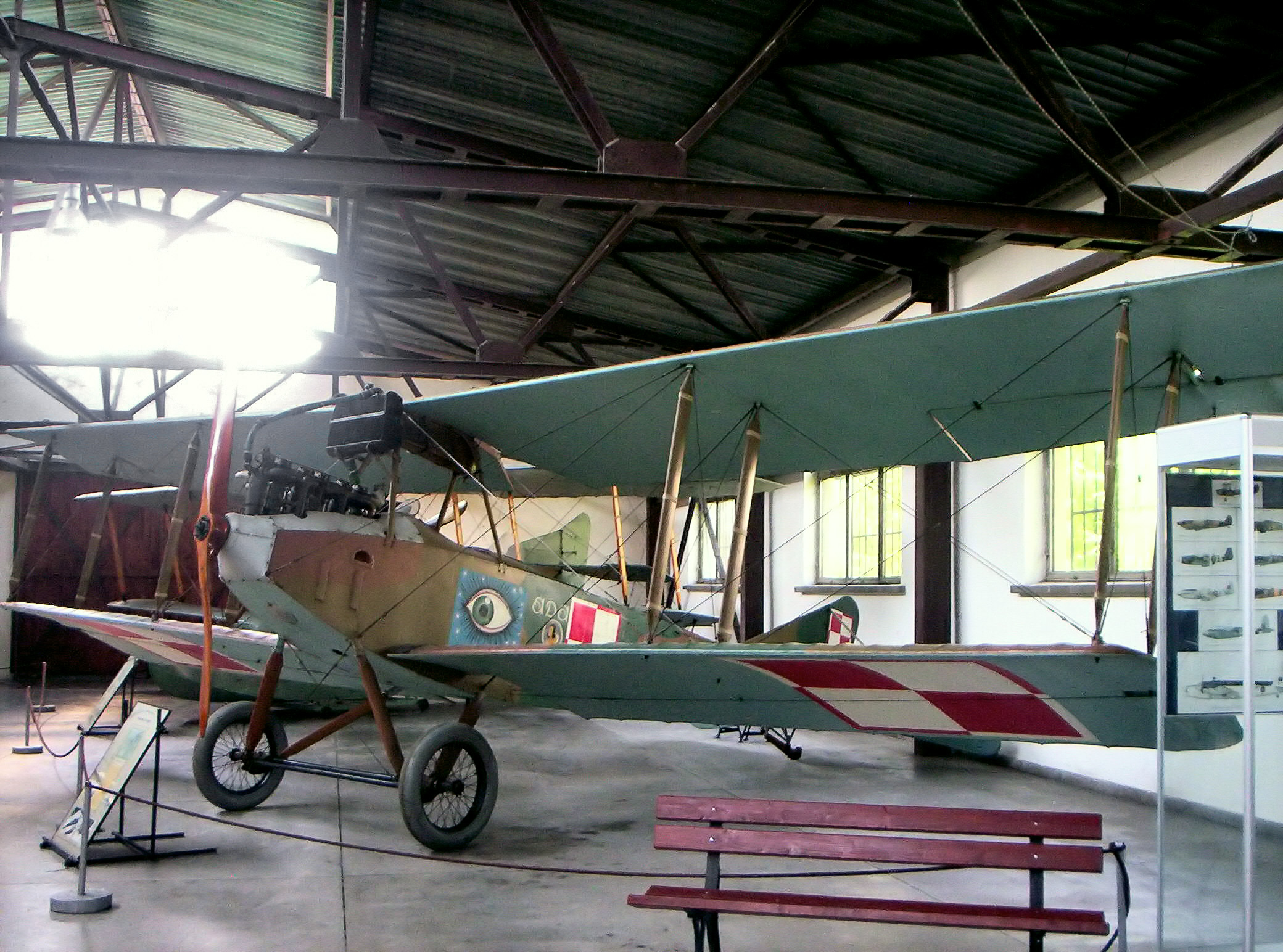
- An Albatros B.IIa in the Polish Aviation Museum

General information
- Type: Reconnaissance aircraft
- Manufacturer: Albatros Flugzeugwerke
- Designer: Robert Thelen
- Primary user: Luftstreitkräfte

History
- First flight: 1914

The Albatros B.II, (post-war company designation L.2) was an unarmed two-seat reconnaissance biplane designed and produced by the German aircraft manufacturer Albatros Flugzeugwerke. It was the aircraft that brought Albatros Flugzeugwerke to the world's attention.

The design of the B.II, which included an unusually strong fuselage and an atypically flexible trailing edge, drew heavily upon the preceding Albatros B.I. Various measures were incorporated to elevate its usefulness as a reconnaissance aircraft, such as the presence of large square cutouts in the lower wing spars to increase downwards visibility from the observer's position. The pilot was seated behind the observer, rather than in front as later convention would dictate. In terms of flying performance, the B.II was inherently stabile and relatively docile, characteristics that naturally lent itself to the trainer role for which a dedicated variant, the B.IIA, would be developed. Further developments, including a floatplane and the Albatros B.III, would also be produced.

The B.II was active from the onset of the First World War, being operated by the Luftstreitkräfte during the opening year of the conflict primarily to perform aerial reconnaissance. It was displaced from frontline service due to the arrival of more capable armed reconnaissance types, and was then used as a primary trainer. The B.II proved to be an export success, being adopted by multiple countries, both inside and outside of the Central Powers. Some of these overseas operators, such as the Swedish Air Force in 1919 and the Polish Air Force, continued to operate the type even after the Armistice of 11 November 1918 that ended the conflict.

== Design and development ==
There is some dispute over the origins of this B.II; the aeronautical engineer Ernst Heinkel claimed to have designed the aircraft, however this claim is widely considered untrue by many aviation historians. It is commonly accepted that the aircraft's actual designer was Robert Thelen. Irrespective of this controversy, the design process commenced during peacetime and drew extensively upon the preceding Albatros B.I. One of the most clear visual distinctions between the B.I and the B.II was a noticeably shorter wingspan of the latter.

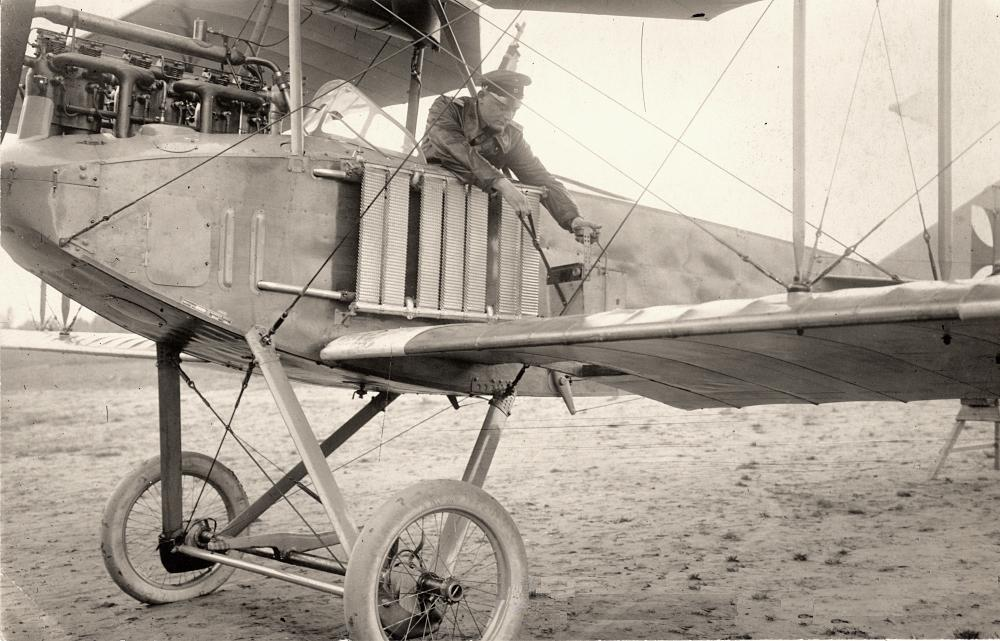
Side view of an Albatros B.II on the ground, circa 1914

The fuselage of the B.II, which was atypically strong for the era, was primarily composed of plywood. The primary structural members of this fuselage comprised four longerons of mixed construction, comprising ash forward of the cockpit and spruce to the aft, that tapered sharply towards the rear. The design of the fuselage was commonplace amongst the company's twin-seat aircraft. The nose of the aircraft features a rounded metal panel along with the aircraft's engine; various engines would be used to power the type, such as the Mercedes D.II, which was capable of up to 89 kW (120 hp). The majority of the engine block was uncovered. Cooling was achieved via radiators fitted to the sides of the forward fuselage alongside the cockpit.

The B.II was operated by a crew of two; as was commonplace at the time, the pilot was seated in the rear cockpit while the observer was seated in the forward position. The field of view from observer's position was partially obstructed downwards by the center-section trestle while the forward view was negatively impacted by the protruding engine block. To improve the downward field of view, large square cutouts were present in the lower wing spars; the lower wing also had a shorter span than its upper counterpart. The structure of the wing followed the company's established practices, comprising a pair of spars, the rearward of which being roughly in the middle of the wing, making the trailing edge atypically flexible and thus gave the B.II a level of inherent stability. It had ailerons with an inverse taper while the operating cables ran externally over the surface of the lower wing.

The B.II was furnished with a large triangular tail, akin to the B.I; it had an unbalanced rudder and elevator control surfaces. Both the tailplane and fin were braced via a streamlined steel strut. The structure was mainly composed of lightweight steel tubing, while the exterior covering was fabric. The undercarriage used a traditional V-shaped chassis and was also composed of steel tubing; a claw-type break was fitted to the center of the axel. The tailskid, which was made of ash, featured an elastic shock chord and was installed upon an inverted pylon structure.

Various improvements and modifications were made to the B.II following its entry to service. Many aircraft would receive strengthening, particularly around the tail unit, while the radiators were also relocated from the fuselage sides to the center of the wing's leading edge. A floatplane variant of the B.II was developed, known as the W.1 or B.II-W, as was a purpose-built trainer with increased wingspan, dual flying controls, and different engines, designated the B.IIa. Further developments of the design led to the Albatros B.III, which was produced in small numbers. Across multiple variants, large numbers of the B.II were built both on behalf of the Luftstreitkräfte and various other military air services, typically those amongst the Central Powers.

== Operational history ==
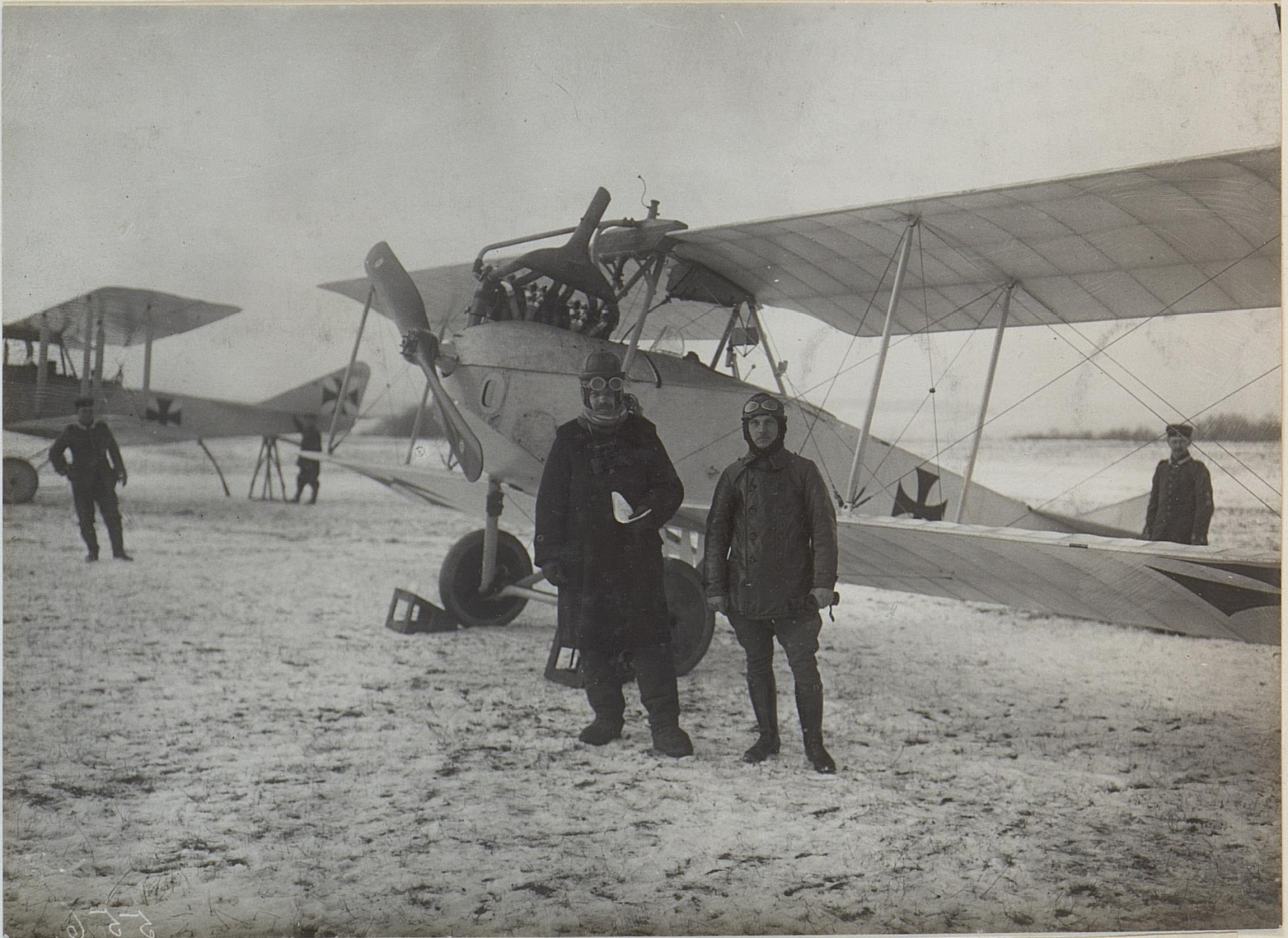
Military personnel in front of a B.II, circa 1916

=== Germany ===
First flown in 1914, the B.II was already operationally active by the outbreak of the First World War during July 1914. It was heavily used through the first 12 months of the conflict in the aerial reconnaissance role; however, as the Allies fielded increasing numbers of armed military aircraft, the B.II was relatively defenseless due to its lack of armament. Thus, following the introduction of the armed C-type two-seaters that took over the reconnaissance role, the B.II was relegated from frontline duties. However, largely due to its relatively docile flight characteristics and economic engine, the B.II found a new life, remaining in use as a trainer, and thus remained active with the Luftstreitkräfte throughout the conflict.

During 1914, the B.II established a world altitude record of 4,500 m (14,800 ft).

A B.II from Feldflieger Abteilung 41 was one of the first landplanes (as opposed to Zeppelin) to drop bombs on England that caused some damage; on 16 April 1915, ten bombs were dropped by hand in the area of Sittingbourne and Faversham. No significant damage or casualties resulted.

=== Sweden ===
During 1914, Albatros Flugzeugwerke toured several countries across northern Europe, performing displays of the then-new B.II. It was considered one of the best primary trainer aircraft available at that time. However, both the landing gear and propeller of the demonstrator aircraft were damaged upon its arrival in Sweden. Due to the outbreak of the First World War, no spares could be sent and the aircraft was interned. It was subsequently repaired and operated in the trainer role by the Swedish Air Force. This aircraft was later copied and manufactured in Sweden by six different aircraft companies: Svenska Aeroplanfabriken (SAF), Södertelge Werkstäder (SW), Marinens Flygväsende (MFV), Nordiska Aviatikbolaget (NAB), AB Thulinverken as the Thulin C and Flygkompaniets Verkstäder Malmen (FVM). It was the first military trainer aircraft in Sweden and received the designation Sk 1 and Ö2 in the Swedish Air Force (the two types differed slightly, mainly by choice of engine). An FVM-built Sk 1 Albatros is on public display in the Swedish Air Force Museum near Linköping. The type was used until 1935. One aircraft was later sold to Finland.

=== Finland ===
NAB Albatros Type 9 (and SW 20 Albatros), Type 12 and Type 17 were among the first aircraft of the Finnish Air Force. It was in use between 1918 and 1923. There were two Type 9s, and one each of the Type 12 and 17. There was also one SW 20 Albatros, which was similar to the Type 9. The Type 12 aircraft was destroyed in the ferry flight to Finland; the remains of the aircraft were found near Eckerö, Åland. Type 12 was actually a modified Curtiss Twin JN with floats made by NAB.

=== Austro-Hungary ===
The Albatros B.II was widely used by the K.u.K; somewhat confusingly, it was assigned the designation Albatros B.I (series 21).

== Variants ==
B.II
Developed from the B.I, the B.II entered production in 1914; (Company post-war designation L.2).
B.IIa
Strengthened airframe, particularly the tail section and 120 hp (89 kW) Mercedes D.II or 120 hp (89 kW) Argus As III engines with radiators moved to the leading edge of the upper centre section; (Company post-war designation L.30).
B.II (Ph) series 23
Production of the B.I in Vienna by Phönix Flugzeug-Werke AG, for the Austro-Hungarian Imperial and Royal Aviation Troops.
B.II (Ph) series 24
Production of the B.I in Vienna by Phönix Flugzeug-Werke AG, for the Austro-Hungarian Imperial and Royal Aviation Troops.
W.1
Seaplane with twin floats and a 150 hp (112 kW) Benz Bz.III engine.
Thulin C
Licence built version by AB Thulinverken

== Operators ==
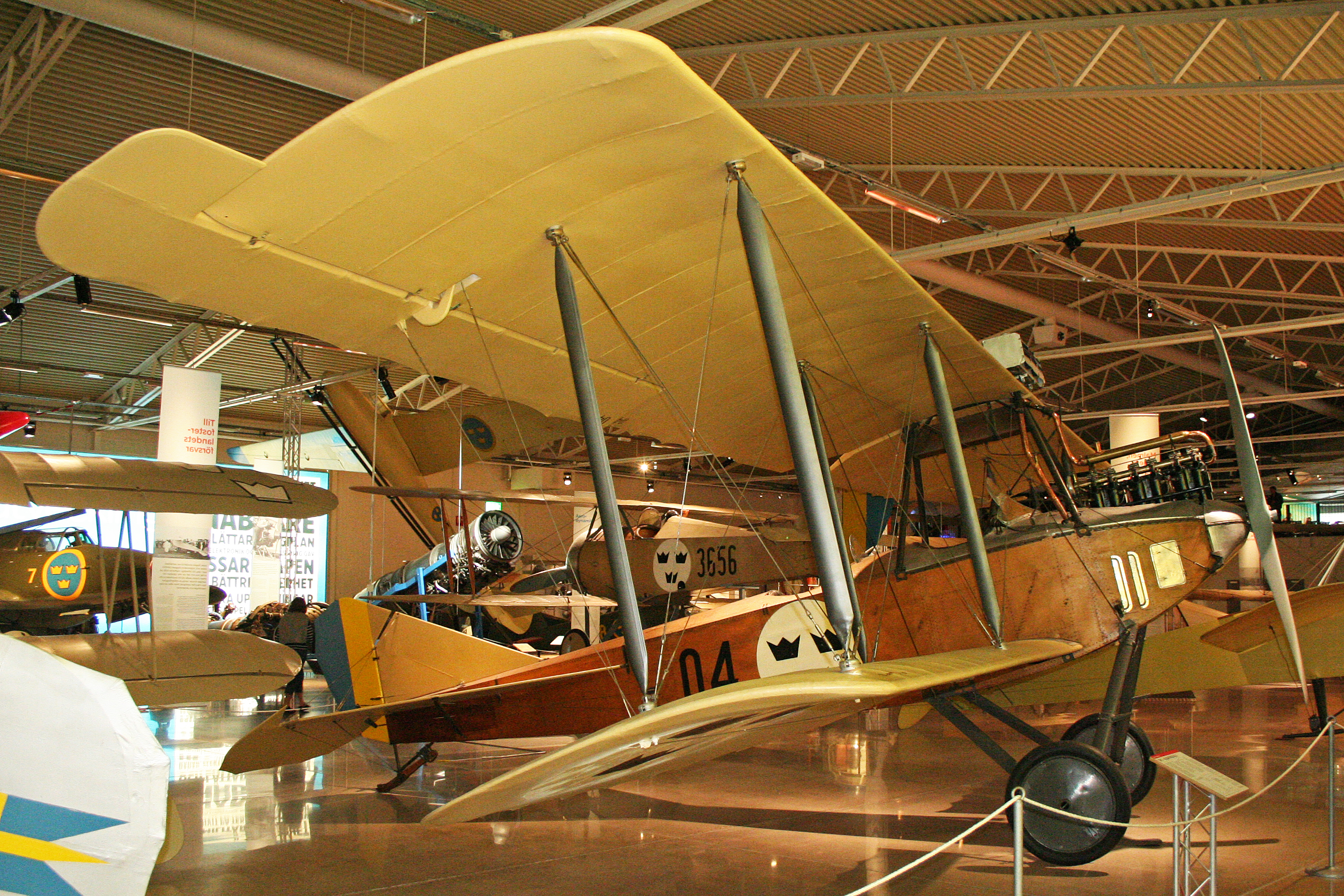
Albatros B.II (Sk 1) in the Swedish Air Force Museum.

German Empire

- Luftstreitkräfte
- Kaiserliche Marine

Austria-Hungary

- Austro-Hungarian Imperial and Royal Aviation Troops

Kingdom of Bulgaria

- Bulgarian Air Force operated this type to 1918

Finland

- Finnish Air Force operated three aircraft (two NAB 9, one SW 20) in 1918-20

Latvia

- Latvian Air Force

Lithuania

- Lithuanian Air Force operated six aircraft postwar
- Air Club of Lithuania from 1929 until late 1930s used one ex-military Albatros B.II

Ottoman Empire

- Ottoman Air Force

Poland

- Polish Air Force operated 116 B.IIs and B.IIas between 1918 and 1927. A dozen or so remained within civil aviation until 1937.

Sweden

- Swedish Air Force operated 47 aircraft (locally designated Sk 1/Ö2).
- Swedish Navy operated five aircraft between 1920 and 1929.

United Kingdom

- Royal Naval Air Service, Royal Flying Corps, Royal Air Force operated one aircraft from August 1914 - February 1918.

== Specifications (B.II with Mercedes D.II engine) ==
Data from German Aircraft of the First World War

General characteristics

- Crew: Two
- Length: 7.63 m (25 ft 0.38 in)
- Wingspan: 12.8 m (42 ft 0 in)
- Height: 3.15 m (10 ft 4 in)
- Wing area: 40.12 m^{2} (431.8 sq ft)
- Empty weight: 723 kg (1,594 lb)
- Gross weight: 1,071 kg (2,361 lb)
- Powerplant: 1 × Mercedes D.II , 89.5 kW (120 hp)

Performance

- Maximum speed: 120 km/h (75 mph, 65 kn)
- Endurance: Four hours
- Service ceiling: 3,000 m (9,840 ft)
- Rate of climb: 1.6 m/s (320 ft/min)

== See also ==
Related development

- Albatros B.I
- Albatros B.III
- Albatros C.III
- Lebed XI
- Lebed XII

Aircraft of comparable role, configuration, and era

- Hansa-Brandenburg B.I

Records set

- Flight endurance record#Non-refueled.2C manned

Related lists

- List of military aircraft of Germany
