= Le Rhône 9C =

Rotary aircraft engine

9C
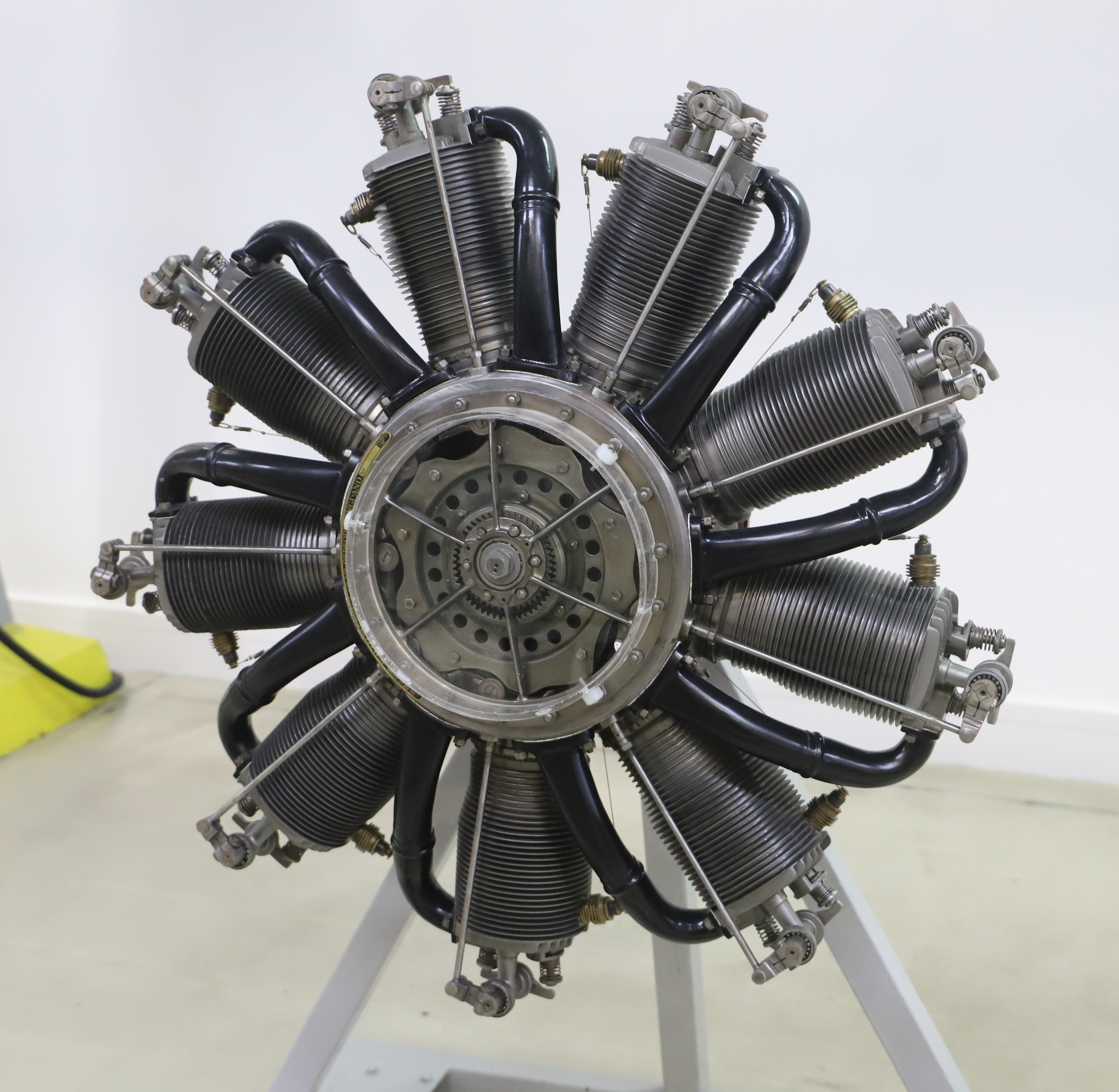
- Le Rhône 9C engine on display at the Imperial War Museum Duxford
- Type: Rotary engine
- National origin: France
- Manufacturer: Société des Moteurs Le Rhône; Gnome et Rhône; Union Switch & Signal (US); Daimler Company (UK); W. H. Allen (UK); F.W. Berwick & Co (UK); AB Thulinverken (Sweden)
- First run: 1912
- Major applications: Nieuport 11; Sopwith Pup
- Number built: >10,000
- Developed into: Le Rhône 9J

The Rhône 9C is a nine-cylinder rotary aircraft engine first produced in France by the Société des Moteurs Le Rhône. Also known as the Rhône 80 hp in a reference to its nominal power rating, the engine was fitted to many military aircraft types during the First World War.

In addition to French production, Le Rhône 9C engines were built under license in Great Britain, Italy, Sweden and the United States. The Swedish engines were badged as the Thulin A. In the mid‑1920s, some American‑manufactured war-surplus 9Cs were rebuilt as radial engines and sold under the Super Rhone designation.

== Design and development ==
First marketed in 1912, the 80 horsepower 9C was the first of the Rhône series rotary engines to have nine cylinders. In common with earlier seven cylinder Le Rhône series engines, the 9C featured copper induction pipes and used a single push-pull rod to operate its two overhead valves. Unlike the later 110 horsepower 9J, the induction pipes and push rods were located on the front of the engine.

Prior to the outbreak of World War One, aircraft powered by the Rhône 9C set numerous long distance city to city records including a highly publicised 1,400 km (870 mi) flight from Paris to Gdańsk with a single refuelling stop in Berlin. The 9C also powered the 1913 world altitude record of 6,120 m (20,080 ft) set by the aviator Georges Legagneux in a Nieuport.

The 9C was selected early on for use in military aircraft with the first of many applications being the 1912 Voisin Type 1.

During WW1 the 9C was the engine used in many single-seater scout aircraft such as the Nieuport 11 "Bebe" and the Sopwith Pup. Later in the war most 9Cs were used in training aircraft.

Le Rhône 9C engines were built under licence by Daimler, W.H. Allen, and F.W. Berwick in the United Kingdom; in the United States by the Union Switch and Signal Company; and in Italy. The engines were produced by Thulinverken in Sweden as the Thulin A. Pre-war licences were also negotiated in Germany with Mercedes and Siemens, and with Steyr-Werke for manufacturing rights in Austria-Hungary.

The German Fliegertruppen fitted captured 9Cs in their Fokker Eindeckers in place of engines built by Oberursel (which were themselves licensed built copies of the Gnome Lambda). Eindeckers fitted with the Le Rhône 9C were found to be superior particularly in relation to climb and maximum altitude.

== Super Rhone (radial conversion) ==
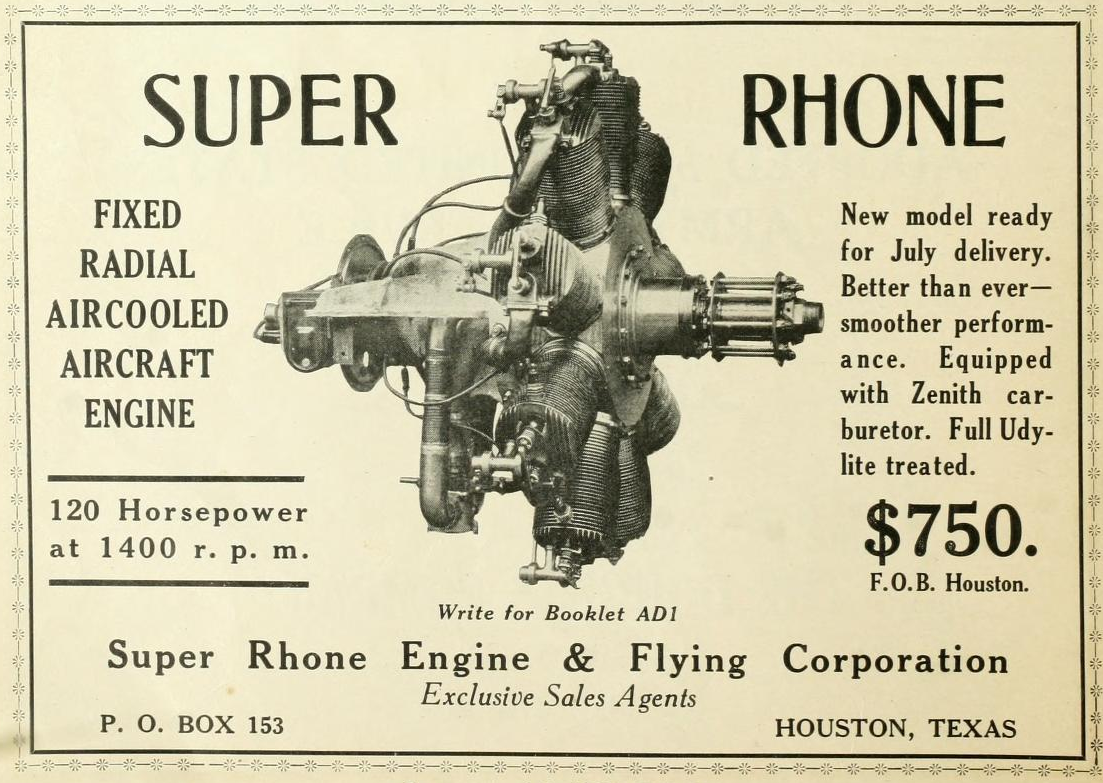
1926 advert for the Super Rhone

In the mid‑1920s, the Texas firm Tips and Smith purchased a large quantity of surplus American‑built Le Rhône 9C rotary engines and converted them into air‑cooled radial engines. During the conversion, balance weights were added to the crankshaft, and a new mounting arrangement was fitted that reversed the engine's orientation so that the induction pipes were positioned on the opposite side from the propeller. The new mounting system also incorporated a revised induction arrangement in which the carburetor was supplied with air drawn in from the crankcase. This design cooled and scavenged the crankcase while heating the inlet air to the carburetor which helped to vaporise the fuel.

The conversion to a radial configuration increased the engine's output from 80 hp (60 kW) at 1,200 rpm to 120 hp (89 kW) at 1,400 rpm. The engine's weight was 340 lb (150 kg). During World War I, the Rhône 9C engines had been purchased by the US War Department for US$4,250 each. In 1926, the Super Rhone engines were on sale for just US$750, and around 400 had been sold by May of that year.

== Applications ==
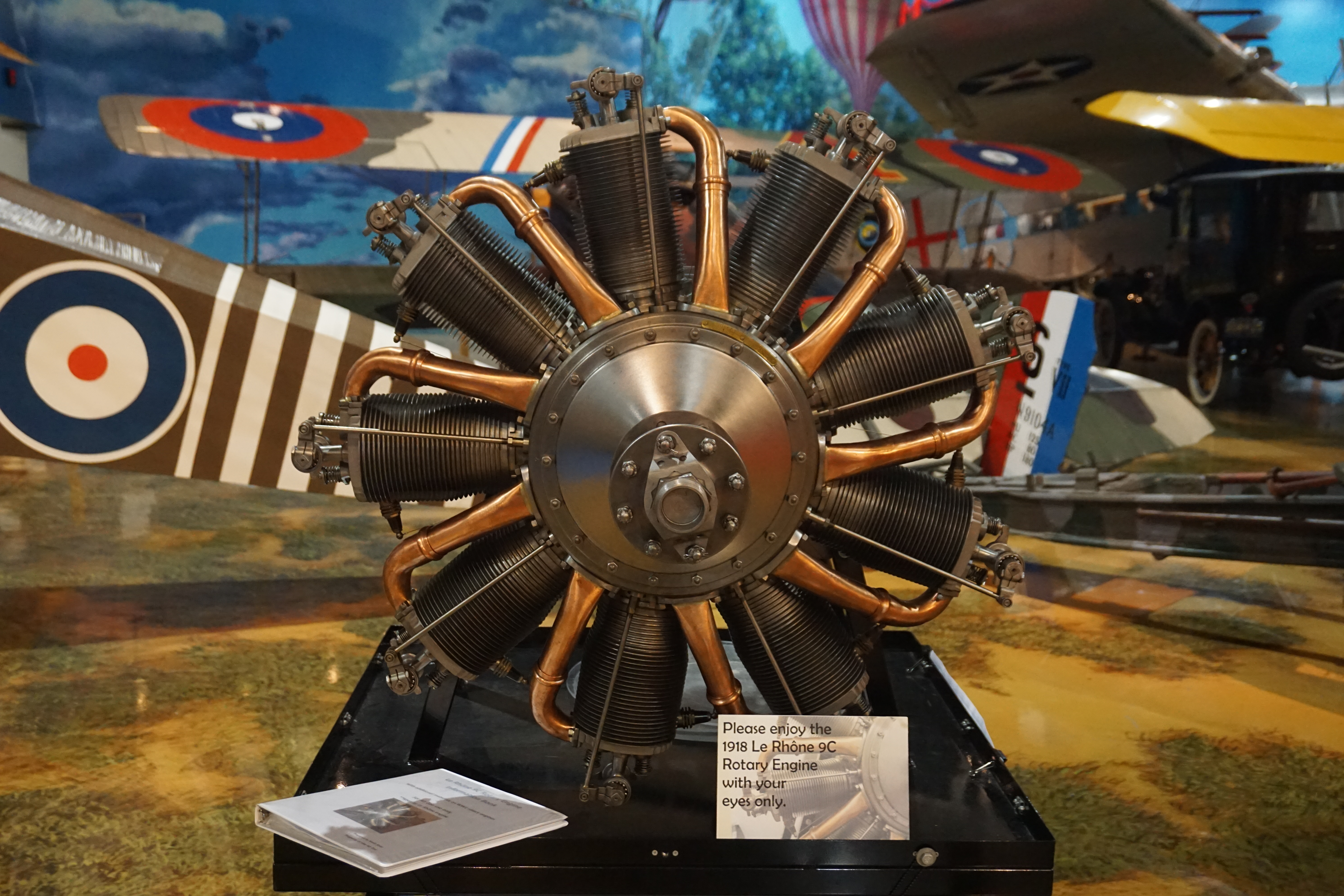
Le Rhône 9C on display at the Air Zoo

- Avro 504
- Bristol M.1
- Bristol Scout
- Caudron G.III
- Caudron G.IV
- Caudron C.43
- Caudron C.127
- Farman HF.20
- Grahame-White Type XV
- Grahame-White Bantam
- Morane-Saulnier G
- Morane-Saulnier H
- Morane-Saulnier L
- Morane-Saulnier N
- Morane-Saulnier P
- Mosca-Bystritsky MB 2bis
- Nieuport 10
- Nieuport 11
- Nieuport 21
- Nieuport 24 (trainers only)
- Nieuport 27 (trainers only)
- Nieuport 80
- Nieuport 81
- Nieuport 82
- Nieuport 83
- Pemberton-Billing P.B.23
- Ponnier M.1
- Royal Aircraft Factory F.E.8
- Royal Aircraft Factory S.E.4
- Sopwith Dove
- Sopwith Pup
- SPAD S.A-1
- SPAD S.A-4
- Thomas-Morse S-4
- Thulin Type A
- TNCA Serie E
- Vickers F.B.12
- Voisin L

=== Super Rhone radial conversion ===
- Alexander Eaglerock
- Bach CS-1
- Ryan M-1
- Spartan C3
- Standard J
- Swallow New Swallow
- Thomas-Morse S-4

== Surviving engines and reproductions ==
Examples of Le Rhône 9C engines are on view in aviation museums either installed in aircraft exhibits or as stand-alone displays. A few examples of the 9C engine remain airworthy both in Europe and North America, one powering a vintage Sopwith Pup biplane in England, and a small number of others having powered reproduction WWI-era aircraft at Old Rhinebeck Aerodrome and other American "living" aviation museums that fly their restored original engines in both similarly restored original, and airworthy reproduction period aircraft.

Both the restored Shuttleworth Collection's airworthy Sopwith Pup and the 1960s-built reproduction Pup of the Owl's Head Transportation Museum (originally from Old Rhinebeck Aerodrome) are each powered by 80 hp Le Rhône 9C rotary engines, and fly regularly throughout the summer months.

A working Le Rhone 9C is on display at the Museo Nacional de Aeronautica in Buenos Aires Argentina.

== Engines on display ==
- A Le Rhône 9C is installed in the Sopwith Pup on display at the Royal Air Force Museum London. After renovation this aircraft flew for a brief period in the 1970s and is now retired.
- A Le Rhône 9C is on public display at the Aerospace Museum of California
- A Le Rhône 9C is on public display at The Hangar Flight Museum

== Specifications (Le Rhône 9C) ==
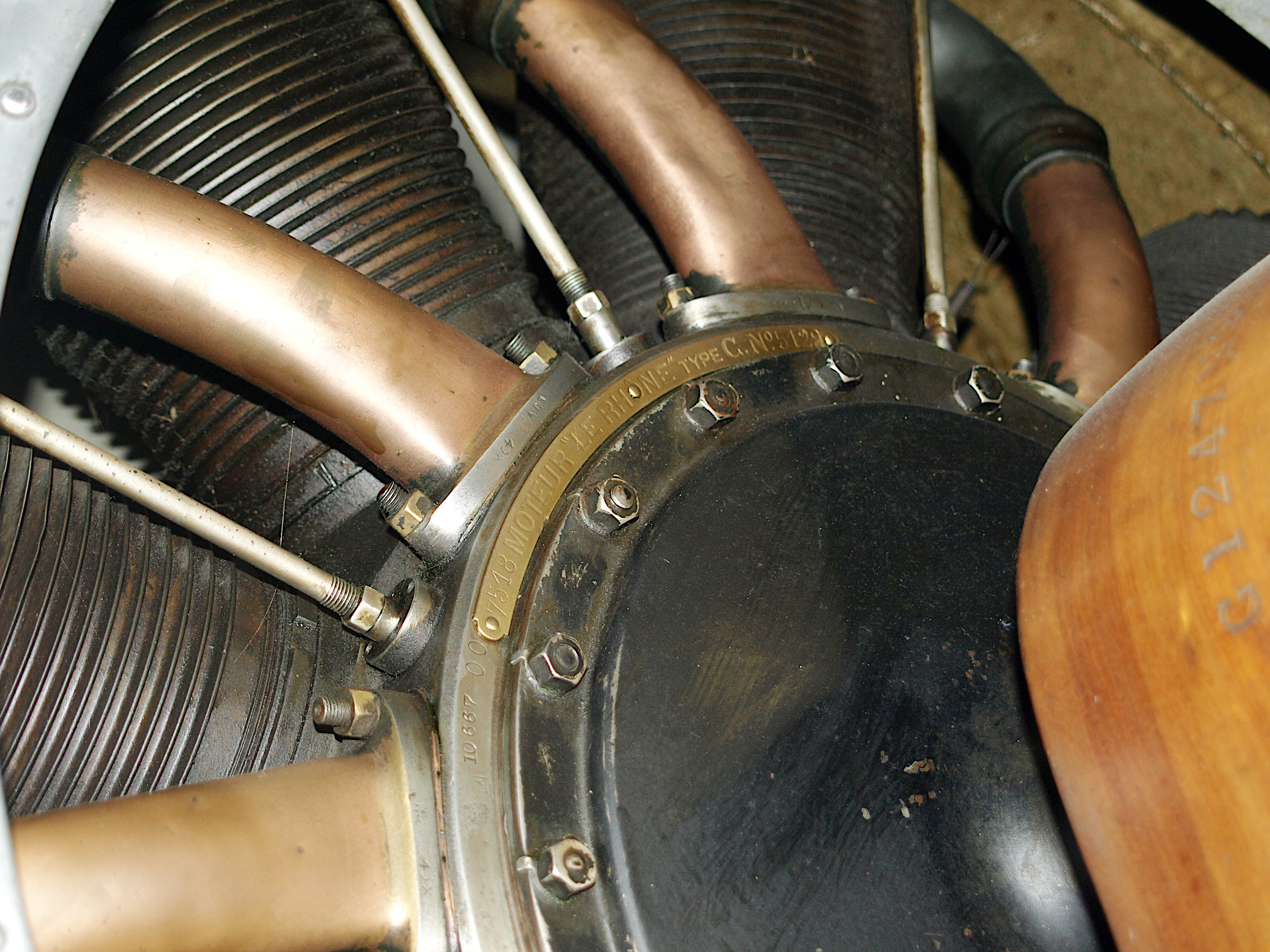
Close-up view of a Le Rhône 9C showing the valve operating rods, front-side induction manifold (contrast with the Le Rhône 9J's rear mounted design) and manufacturer's data plate

Data from Lumsden

=== General characteristics ===
- Type: Nine-cylinder, single-row rotary engine
- Bore: 105 mm (4.13 in)
- Stroke: 140 mm (5.51 in)
- Displacement: 10.89 L (664.47 cu in)
- Diameter: 94.5 cm (37.2 in)
- Dry weight: 121.5 kg (268 lb)

=== Components ===
- Valvetrain: Cam-operated single rocker for both inlet and exhaust valves
- Oil system: Castor oil, total loss
- Cooling system: Air-cooled

=== Performance ===
- Power output: 92 hp (68.6 kW) at 1,300 rpm (maximum)
- Compression ratio: 4.5:1

== See also ==
Comparable engines

- Bentley BR1
- Clerget 9B
- Gnome Monosoupape

Related lists

- List of aircraft engines
