= Mercedes D.II =

Early piston-driven aircraft engine

D.II
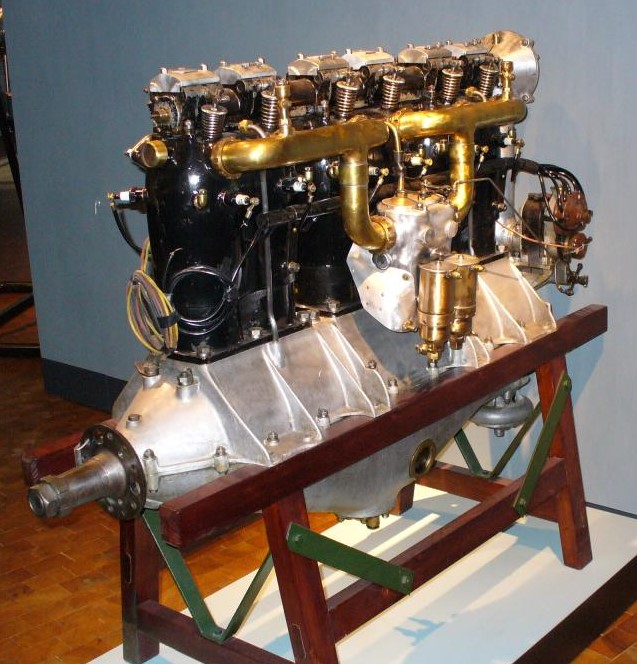
- D II engine at the Deutsches Technikmuseum Berlin
- Type: Inline piston engine
- National origin: Germany
- Manufacturer: Mercedes
- Developed from: Mercedes D.I
- Developed into: Mercedes D.III

The Mercedes D.II was a six-cylinder, SOHC valvetrain liquid-cooled inline aircraft engine built by Daimler during the early stages of World War I. Producing about 110 to 120 hp, it was at the low-end of the power range of contemporary engines, and was generally outperformed by rotaries whose power-to-weight ratio tended to be much better. It also had stiff competition from the Ferdinand Porsche-designed 120 hp Austro-Daimler 6. The D.II was produced only briefly as a result, but its design formed the basis for the later Mercedes D.III which saw widespread use throughout the war.

== Design and development ==
The D.II was based on the Austro-Daimler to a large degree. Like the Austro-Daimler, it was built up from the crankcase, which was milled from two pieces of cast aluminum bolted together at their midline. The cylinders were separately milled from steel and bolted to the top of the crankcase. Steel sleeves were fitted over the cylinders and welded on to form a cooling jacket. Much of this complexity is due to the differential rates of expansion of steel and aluminum, which precluded screwing the cylinders into the crankcase, and the alloys of the era meant that an aluminum cylinder was not possible. Both engines also used a scavenger pump to pump oil out of the crankcase to a separate cylinder, where a second high-pressure pump supplied oil to the engine. This arrangement allowed for a much smaller "sump" on the bottom of the crankcase, reducing the overall size of the engine, although in the case of the D.II it was not nearly as much as the Austro-Daimler.

Where the D.II differed from the Austro-Daimler was largely in mechanical arrangement. For instance, the D.II featured a single overhead cam, powered by a shaft leading up from the crankshaft at the rear of the engine, whereas the Austro-Daimler had a more conventional valvetrain using pushrods driven from the crankcase. Another unique feature was the ability to shift the camshaft to a half-compression position for starting. The D.II used two carburetors located together on one side of the engine, feeding the cylinders through two manifolds; the Austro-Daimler separated its carburetors to locate them closer to the cylinders they fed. The D.II also used a unique cooling jacket design, with every two cylinders being covered by a single jacket.

The D.II was introduced in 1914. It was fairly quickly replaced by the D.III, and ended production around 1916. The D.III was essentially a scaled-up D.II, although it abandoned the paired cooling jackets.

== Applications ==
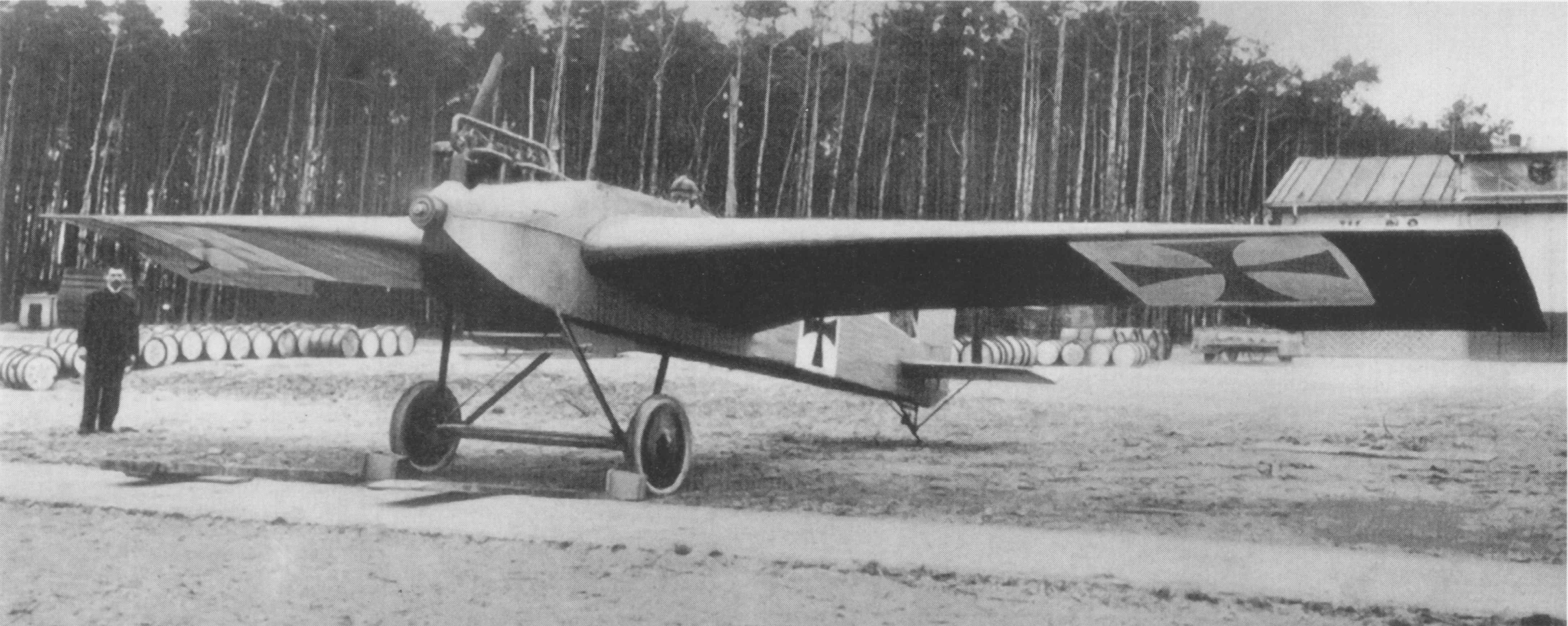
D.II-powered Junkers J 1

- Aviatik B.II
- Aviatik C.I
- Albatros B.I
- Albatros B.II
- DFW B.II
- Fokker D.I
- Fokker V 6
- Friedrichshafen FF.29
- Halberstadt D.II
- Junkers J 1 Blechesel
- Zmaj Fizir FN

== Engines on display ==
One surviving example of this engine had been on display at Old Rhinebeck Aerodrome-its crankshaft had sheared, and the engine is rumored to possibly have been brought to New Zealand.

Deutsche Museum in Munich has one example on display, this is a cutaway model that was created by Daimler

== Specifications (D.II) ==
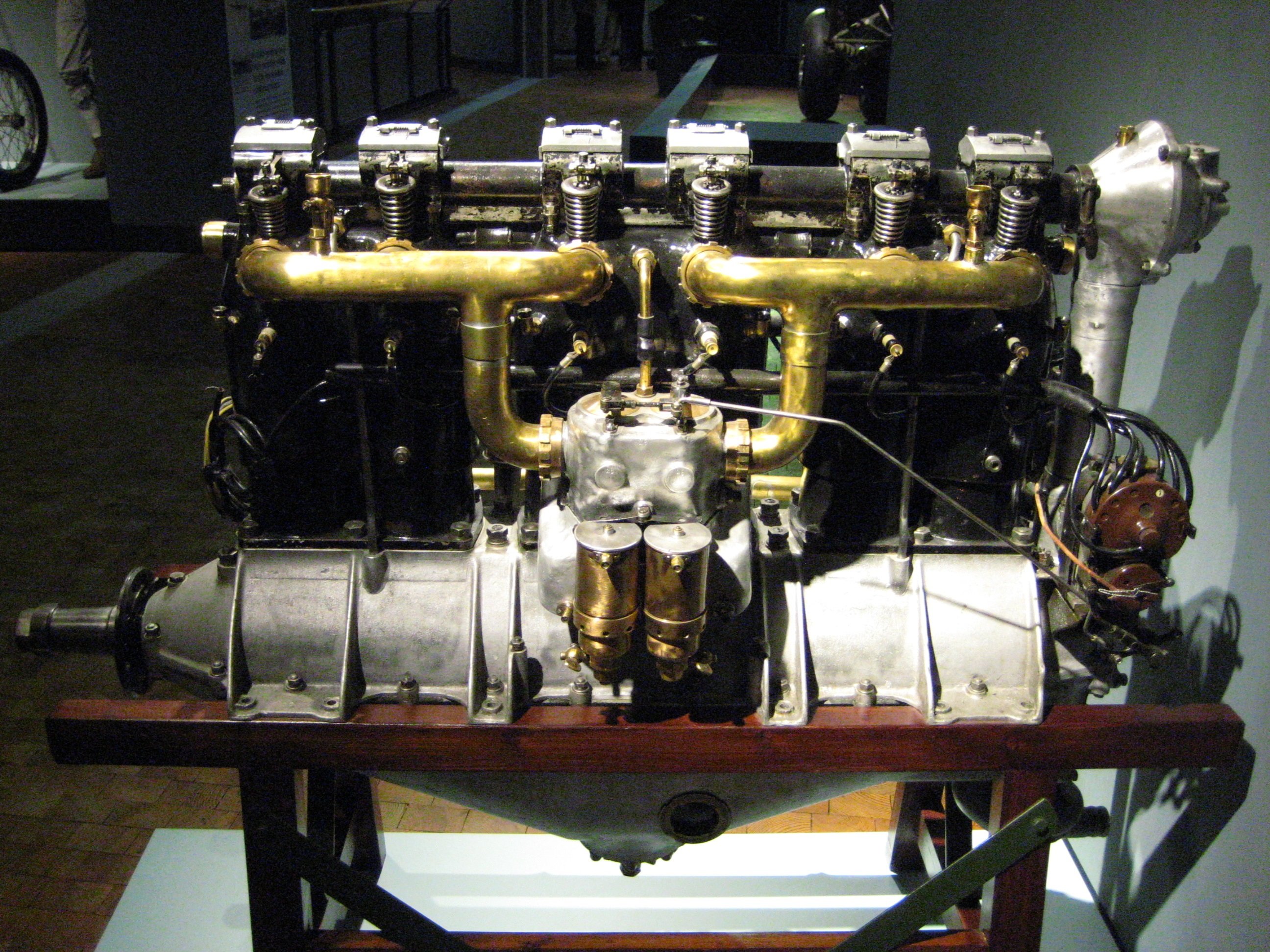
Side view

Data from Albatros D.I-D.II

=== General characteristics ===
- Type: 6-cylinder, inline piston engine
- Bore: 125 mm (4.92 in)
- Stroke: 150 mm (5.91 in)
- Displacement: 11.05 L (674.31 cu in)
- Length: 1,650 mm (64.96 in)
- Width: 490 mm (19.29 in)
- Height: 1,072 mm (42.20 in)
- Dry weight: 210 kg (463 lb)

=== Components ===
- Valvetrain: Single overhead camshaft (SOHC) with two valves per cylinder
- Cooling system: Liquid
- Reduction gear: Direct drive, left-hand tractor

=== Performance ===
- Power output: 120 hp at 1,400 rpm
- Compression ratio: 4,5:1

== See also ==
Comparable engines

- Rolls-Royce Hawk

Related lists

- List of aircraft engines
