= Enoch Thulin =

Swedish aircraft pioneer (1881–1919)

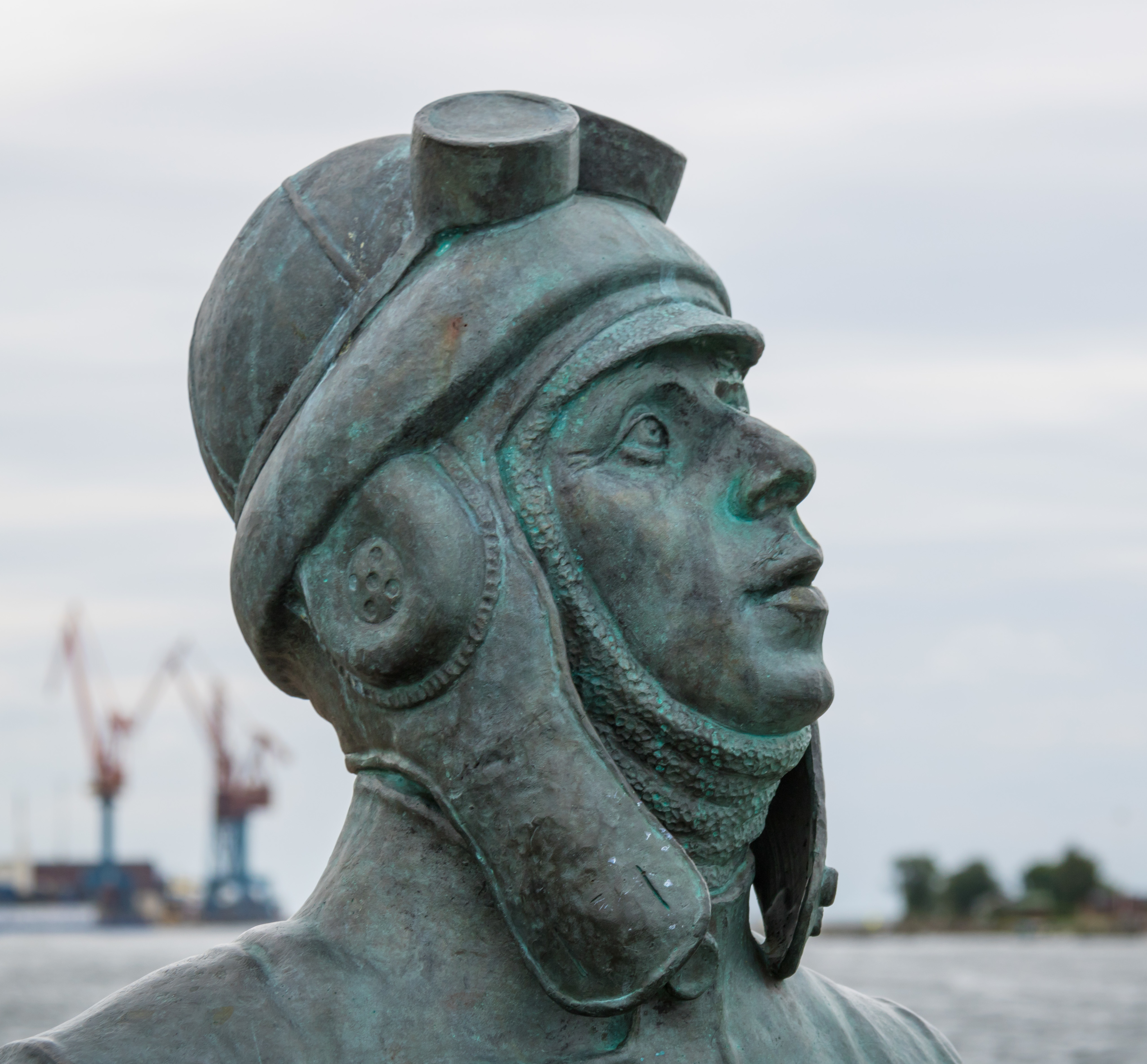
- Statue of Thulin in Landskrona harbour
- Born: September 15, 1881; Simris, Scania, Sweden
- Died: May 14, 1919 (aged 37); Landskrona, Scania, Sweden
- Occupations: Engineer and pilot

Enoch Leonard Thulin (15 September 1881 – 14 May 1919) is primarily remembered as a pioneer of the Swedish aircraft industry. He was an engineer who also worked on cars, lorries and internal combustion engines.

Enoch was born in Simris, Scania, in the south of Sweden. He studied aeronautics 1908-12 and succeeded with flying attempts in 1912. He wrote a thesis on aerodynamics and received a Ph.D. from Lund University in 1912.

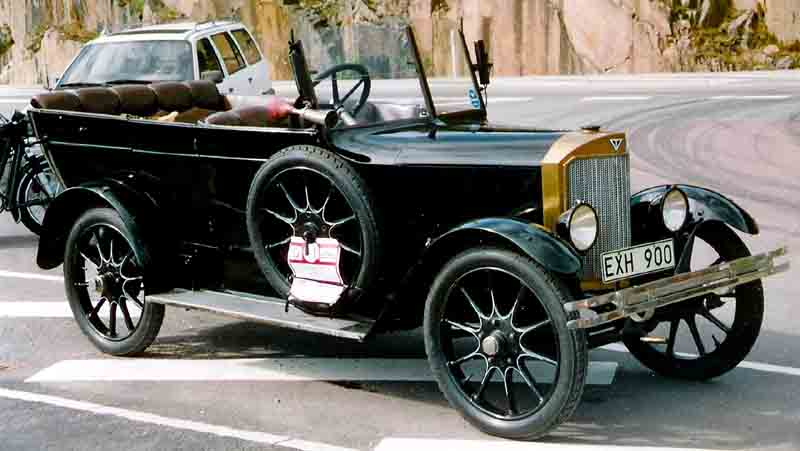
Thulin A25 1925

Thulin lived in Landskrona, where he amongst other things founded AB Thulinverken in 1914 to build aeroplanes; today the company is known as Haldex and manufactures pneumatic brake systems for trains and lorries (trucks). Thulin also started the manufacture of automobiles, which continued until 1928, and what later became Svenska Stridsflygskolan F5 ("The Swedish air-combat school", also known as "Airforcebase 5") at Ljungbyhed in north-western Scania. In 1918 he suggested to the Mayor of Stockholm that he should investigate the possibility of a local airport, and even though the reactions were positive, the idea was postponed until 1936 when Bromma Airport was finally built.

Thulin was killed while practicing flying his K3 airplane on 14 May 1919. According to Palle Mellblom, who started the engine that day, Enoch Thulin was stressed by the successful demonstrations made by Sparmann the same year. Thulin wanted to improve his flying skills but crashed south-east of Landskrona harbour, at the area which during this time was called "Södra Fäladen".

One of the early aeroplanes that Thulin flew is now exhibited at the town museum of Landskrona, along with several propellers and engines.

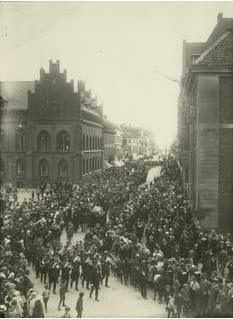
Enoch Thulin's funeral in Landskrona, May 1919. A town pays their final respect to the great flight pioneer. Dr Thulin's funeral was, and still is, the most attended in the town's history.

Thulin is commemorated in Landskrona in several ways. A secondary technical school in Landskrona is called Enoch Thulin-gymnasiet, and a street is called Enoch Thulins väg ("Enoch Thulin road"). The airfield 10 km north of the town has the name Enoch Thulin Airport. This airfield has a 1190 meter long and 30 meter wide runway of asphalt surface but has no regular traffic. ICAO code is ESML. There is also a statue in his honour near Landskrona harbour.

== Sources ==
- Book by Lars Olefeldt: ´´Palle Mellblom - lite snack och mycket verkstad´`, ISBN 978-91-633-2534-2
- Popular scientific magazine article "Allt om Vetenskap" (in Swedish)
