= List of aircraft (Th) =

This is a list of aircraft in alphabetical order beginning with 'Th'.

== Th ==
=== Thaden ===
( (Herbert von) Thaden Metal Aircraft Co, Oakland Airport and San Francisco, CA)

- Thaden T-1 a.k.a. Argonaut
- Thaden T-2
- Thaden T-4

=== Thalman ===
(Harry J Thalman, Salt Lake City, UT)

- Thalman T-1 a.k.a. Argonaut
- Thalman T-3B
- Thalman T-4

=== Thatcher ===
- Thatcher CX4
- Thatcher CX5

=== Thalerhof ===
- Thalerhof U 12

=== The Airplane Factory ===
The Airplane Factory, Pty, Ltd, Tedderfield Airpark, Eikenhof, Johannesburg South, South Africa

- The Airplane Factory Sling 2
- The Airplane Factory Sling 4
- The Airplane Factory Sling TSi

=== The Butterfly ===
(The Butterfly Aircraft LLC)

- The Butterfly Super Sky Cycle
- The Butterfly Aurora
- The Butterfly Emperor
- The Butterfly Ultralight
- The Butterfly Golden
- The Butterfly Golden Monarch
- The Butterfly Turbo Golden

=== Theiss Aviation ===
(Salem, Ohio, United States)

- Theiss Speedster
- Theiss Sportster
- Theiss Ferret
- Theiss NIRV
- Theiss Super Ferret
- Theiss Tarzan
- Theiss TIC

=== THK ===
(Türk Hava Kurumu - Turkish Air League)

- THK-01 - Wedrychowski, J. & Duleba, Leszka & Rrogalski, Stanisław & Teisseyre, Jerzy - Türk Hava Kurumu
- THK-2
- THK-03 - Jacobs, Hans & DFS - (DFS Habicht)
- THK-04 - SSCB - Türk Hava Kurumu (АНТОНОВ УС-4 (Antonov US-4))
- THK-5
- THK-5A
- THK-07 - Antonov, Oleg Konstantinovich & SSBC - Türk Hava Kurumu (Antonov PS-2)
- THK-09 - Schawrow, W. B. & SSCB - Türk Hava Kurumu
- THK-10
- THK-11
- THK-12
- THK-13
- THK-14
- THK-15
- THK-16 Mehmetçik (Turkish: "Little Mehmet"[1])
- THK-TAYSU (Tarimsal Havacilik ve Yangin Söndürme Uçagi)

=== Thomas-Morse ===
(Thomas-(Frank L) Morse (Morse Chain Co) Aircraft Corp, Ithaca, NY)

- Thomas 1910 Biplane
- Thomas 1911 Biplane
- Thomas 1912 Biplane
- Thomas 1913 Monoplane
- Thomas 1913 Biplane
- Thomas 1913 Biplane
- Thomas 1913 Biplane
- Thomas Brothers BP
- Thomas Brothers B-3
- Thomas Brothers B-4
- Thomas Brothers D-2
- Thomas Brothers D-5
- Thomas Brothers E
- Thomas Brothers HS
- Thomas Brothers S-4
- Thomas Brothers S-5
- Thomas Brothers S-6
- Thomas Brothers S-7
- Thomas Brothers S-9
- Thomas Brothers SH-4
- Thomas Brothers T-2
- Thomas-Morse MB-1
- Thomas-Morse MB-2
- Thomas-Morse MB-3
- Thomas-Morse MB-4
- Thomas-Morse MB-6
- Thomas-Morse MB-7
- Thomas-Morse MB-9
- Thomas-Morse MB-10
- Thomas-Morse TA
- Thomas-Morse TA Tractor
- Thomas-Morse TA Hydro
- Thomas-Morse TM-22
- Thomas-Morse TM-23
- Thomas-Morse TM-24
- Thomas-Morse O-6
- Thomas-Morse O-19
- Thomas-Morse O-20
- Thomas-Morse O-21
- Thomas-Morse O-23
- Thomas-Morse O-33
- Thomas-Morse O-41
- Thomas-Morse O-42
- Thomas-Morse P-13 Viper
- Thomas-Morse R-2
- Thomas-Morse R-5

=== Thomas ===
(Walter J Thomas, Chicago, IL)

- Thomas A-1 Sport
- Thomas A-2 Sport

=== Thomas ===
(M A Thomas, Pasadena, CA)

- Thomas MT-1

=== Thompson ===
(De Lloyd Thompson, Cicero, IL, built by Charles H Day at Griffith Park, Los Angeles, CA)

- Thompson 1914 Biplane a.k.a. Thompson-Day

=== Thompson ===
(Milford H Thompson, Eagle Grove, IA)

- Thompson 1928 Monoplane
- Thompson Midget

=== Thompson ===
((R Lavin) Thompson Aircraft Co, Los Angeles, CA)

- Thompson M-1

=== Thompson ===
(Paul R Thompson, Independence, MO)

- Thompson T-4875

=== Thompson ===
(Earl O Thompson, Marshalltown, IA)

- Thompson Sportplane

=== Thompson ===
(B B Thompson, Belle, WV)

- Thompson BBT-2

=== Thompson ===
(Carl Thompson, Wakefield, MA)

- Thompson 1949 Monoplane
- Thompson Mighty Mite
- Thompson Poncho

=== Thompson ===
(W Z Thompson, Harrodsburg, KY)

- Thompson 1956 Monoplane

=== Thompson ===
((Richard) Thompson Aircraft Co, Philadelphia, PA)

- Thompson Boxmoth

=== Thompson-Balbone ===
(Ralph & Harry Thompson)

- Thompson-Balbone Special

=== Thor ===
(Thor-Air Inc.)

- Thor T/A
- Thor T-1
- Thor T-1A
- Thor T-2
- Thor Juno

=== Thorp ===
(Thorp Aircraft Co, Pacoima, CA) Data from:

- Thorp T-1 - 1931 Design study of a two place light plane.
- Thorp T-2 - 1932 Design study.
- Thorp T-3 - 1933 Two/four-place, all-metal, retractable, built by Rudy Paulic.
- Thorp T-4 - 1934 Design study.
- Thorp T-5 - 1935 Tandem two-place trainer, built by Boeing School.
- Thorp T-6 - 1936 Modified T-5 with tricycle landing gear, built by Boeing School.
- Thorp T-7 - 1939 Design study of an all-wood airplane.
- Thorp T-8 - 1940 Design study.
- Thorp T-9 - 1941 Design study.
- Mod 33 1942 Lockheed Little Dipper single-place for flying infantryman.
- Mod 34 1943 Lockheed Big Dipper two-place single-engine pusher.
- Thorp T-10 - 1944 Series "I" Sky Skooter - Taildragger - proposed engine Franklin 2AC-99 50 hp.
- Thorp T-11 - 1945 Sky Skooter, 65 hp (48 kW) Lycoming O-145. FAR Part 23 certification.
- Thorp TL-1 - 1948 Design study - Liaison Aircraft.
- Thorp T-111 - 1953 Sky Skooter, 75 hp (56 kW) Lycoming O-145. FAR Part 23 certification.
- Thorp T-211 - 1963 Sky Skooter, 100 hp (75 kW) Continental O-200. FAR Part 23 certification.
- Thorp T-12 - 1945-50 Design study.
- Thorp T-13 - 1950 FL-23, high wing observation prototype built by Fletcher Aviation.
- Thorp T-14 - 1951 FD-25, "Defender" armed light plane, 225 hp (168 kW) Continental, by Fletcher Aviation.
- Thorp T-15 - 1952 FU-24, agricultural aircraft for Aerial Topdressing market, prototype built by Fletcher Aviation, large scale production in New Zealand.
- Thorp T-16 - 1956-58 180 hp, Piper Cherokee preliminary design. PA-28 first built with 150 hp (110 kW).
- Thorp T-17 - 1958 Wing Derringer original design. Began as twin engine Skooter.
- Thorp T-18 Tiger - 1960 All-metal two-place, high-performance homebuilt.
  - Don Taylor's T-18 was first homebuilt to fly around the world.
  - Clive Canning flew his T-18 from Australia to England and return.
- Thorp T-19 - 1962 Design study - Four-place, twinjet aircraft using Williams Research engine.
- Thorp T-20 - 1971 Design study - Single-place, open-cockpit sport plane
- Thorp T-21 - 1971 Design study - Utility airplane.
- Thorp T-22 - 1972 Design study - Sport plane.
- Thorp T-23 - 1972 Design study - Single-place high-performance sport plane.
- Thorp SE5-F replica - Prototype built.
- Thorp T-28 - 1974 Design study - Two-place, twin-engine airplane based on the T-18.

=== Thornton ===
(Kenneth Montee, Santa Monica, CA)

- Thornton N-2 Special

=== Thrush Aircraft ===
- Thrush 400
- Thrush 510/550
- Thrush 660

=== Thruster ===
(Thruster Air Services, Langworth, Lincoln, England, United Kingdom)

- Thruster T300
- Thruster T600 Sprint
- Thruster TST MK1

=== Thruster ===
(Thruster Aircraft (Australia) Pty. Ltd.)

- Thruster TST

=== Thunder Wing ===
(Kenneth Montee, Santa Monica, CA)

- Thunder Wing Curtiss P-40C
- Thunder Wing Focke-Wulf Fw.190A 1/2 scale
- Thunder Wing Focke-Wulf Fw.190A 4/5 scale
- Thunder Wing Supermarine Spitfire Mk IX

=== Thunderbird ===
(Kenneth Montee, Santa Monica, CA)

- Thunderbird 1928 Monoplane
- Thunderbird W-14

=== Thulin ===
(AB Thulinverken)

- Thulin Type A
- Thulin Type B
- Thulin Type C
- Thulin Type D
- Thulin Type E
- Thulin Type FA
- Thulin Type G
- Thulin Type GA
- Thulin Type H
- Thulin Type K
- Thulin Type KA
- Thulin Type L
- Thulin Type LA
- Thulin Type M
- Thulin Type N
- Thulin Type NA

=== Thurston ===
( Thurston Aircraft Corp, Sanford, ME)

- Thurston HRV-1
- Thurston TA-16 Seafire
- Thurston TA16 Trojan
- Thurston TA-19 Seamaster
- Thurston Teal

=== THvK (KIBM) ===
(Turk Hava Kuvvetleri, Kayseri Hava Ikmal Bakim Merkezi Komutanligi - Turkish Air Force, Kayseri Air Supply and Maintenance Centre Command)

- KIBM Mavi Isik 78-XA
- KIBM Mavi Isik-B
- KIBM Mavi Isik-G
