= List of United States fighter aircraft =

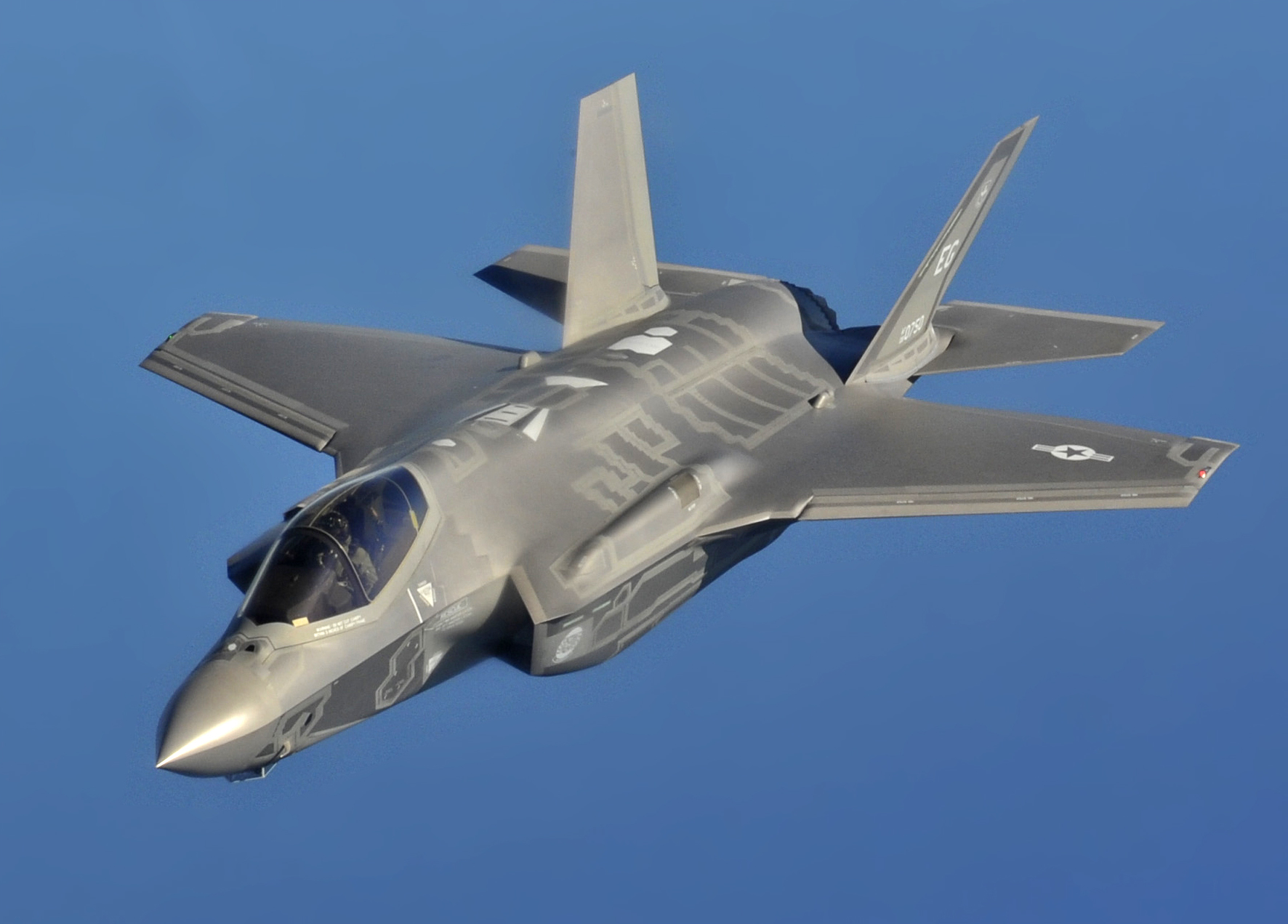
A U.S Air Force F-35A

This is a list of fighter aircraft used by the United States.

This includes those of the 1962 United States Tri-Service aircraft designation system, 1924–1962 Air Force, pre-1962 Navy, and undesignated military aircraft.

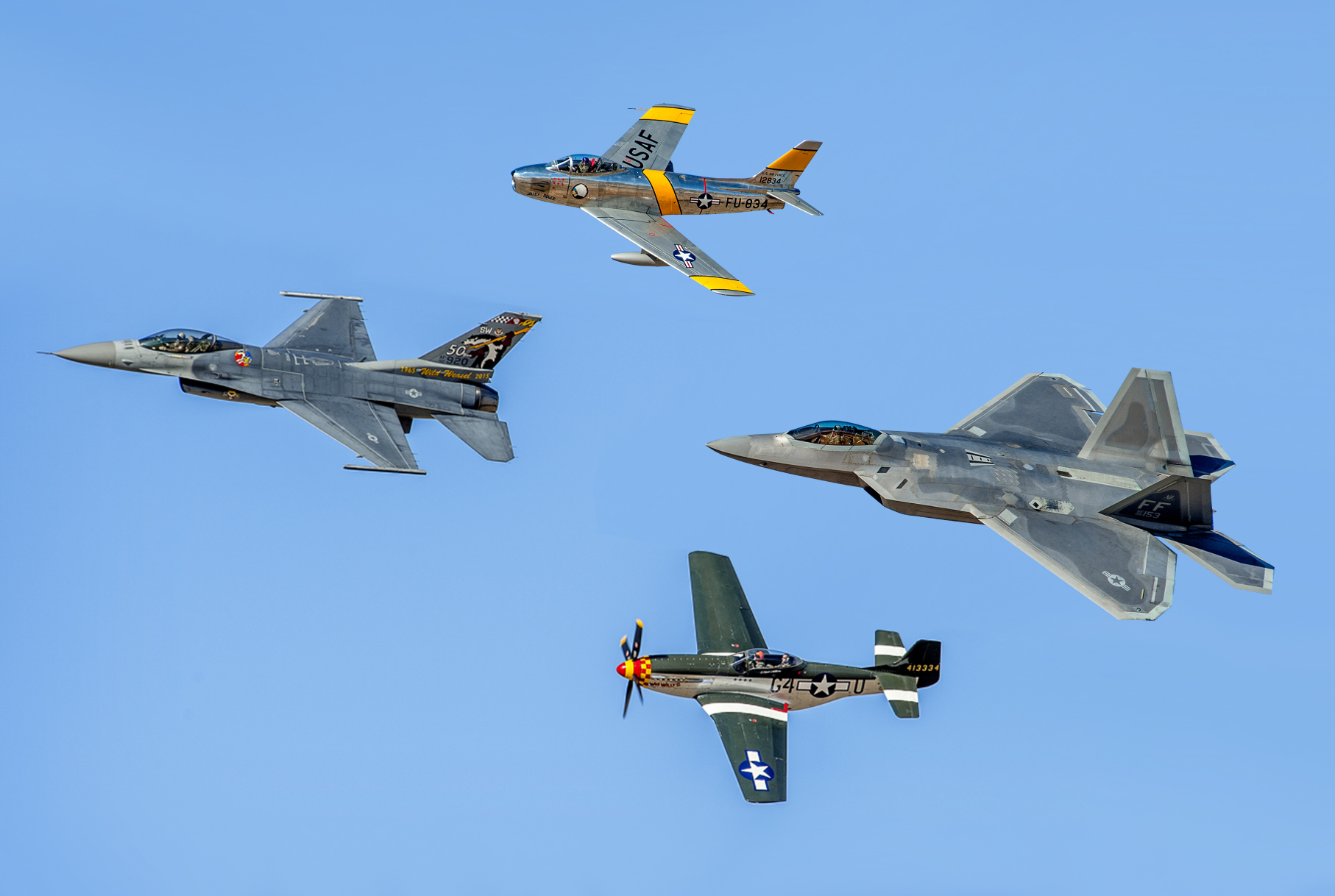
An F-16 Fighting Falcon (left), P-51D Mustang (bottom), F-86 Sabre (top), and F-22 Raptor (right) fly in formation; Heritage Flight over Davis-Monthan AFB

== Army ==
This list includes aircraft operated by the United States Army, Army Signal Corps, and American Expeditionary Forces.
Name	Role	Manufacturer	Notes	Year of first flight	Introduction	Number built
VE-8		Lewis & Vought Corporation	Four ordered by the U.S. Army on October 11, 1918; two were canceled	Unknown	Unknown	2
VE-9		Lewis & Vought Corporation	2 converted from VE-7 for U.S. Army; 22 built for the U.S. Army, 17 built for the U.S. Navy.	Unknown	Unknown	24 (US Army) 17 (USN)
Heinrich Pursuit	Fighter	Victor Aircraft Corporation	The only known aircraft designed by Albert S. Heinrich.	1917	Never	4
PG-1	Pursuit and ground attack aircraft	Aeromarine	Developed for and by the army; likely the firm's last place	1922	Never	3
XP-4	Prototype fighter	Boeing		1927	Never	1
XP-9	Experimental fighter	Boeing	First monoplane fighter produced by Boeing.	1930	Never	1

== Air Force ==
This list includes aircraft operated by the United States Air Force and its predecessors: the United States Army Air Service (USAAS); the United States Army Air Corps (USAAC); and the United States Army Air Forces (USAAF).
Name	Role	Manufacturer	Notes	Year of first flight	Introduction	Number built
VE-7 "Bluebird"	Fighter/trainer	Lewis & Vought Corporation	First United States Navy fighter aircraft. Used as a racer and trainer. In 1922, a VE-7 became the first airplane to take off from an American aircraft carrier.	1917	Unknown	128
E-1	Military trainer/early fighter	Standard Aircraft Corporation		1917	Never	168
M-8	Monoplane fighter	Loening Aeronautical Engineering		1918	Never	55
Orenco B	Fighter	Orenco		1918	Unknown	Unknown
MB-1	Fighter	Thomas-Morse Aircraft		1918	Never	1
MB-2	Fighter	Thomas-Morse Aircraft		1918	Never	2
LUSAC-11/21	Fighter	Engineering Division/Packard	Broke the world altitude record in 1920 and 1921	1918	Unknown	30
TP-1	Biplane fighter	Engineering Division		Unknown	Never	2
MB-3	Fighter	Thomas-Morse Aircraft & Boeing		1919	1919	265
VCP/PW-1	USAAS pursuit prototype	Engineering Division		1920	Never	2
PW-2	Monoplane fighter	Loening Aeronautical Engineering		1920	Never	7
P-6 Hawk	Fighter	Curtiss Aeroplane and Motor Company		Unknown	1927	70
P-11		Curtiss Aeroplane and Motor Company	Three ordered with the Curtiss H-1640 Chieftain engine, two were completed with the V-1570 and redesignated P-6D	Unknown	Unknown	3?
XP-17 Hawk	Experimental	Curtiss Aeroplane and Motor Company	Testbed for experimental Wright V-1470 engine.	Unknown	Never	Unknown
XP-21	Experimental					
XP-23 Hawk (Model 63)		Curtiss Aeroplane and Motor Company	Unfinished P-6E with light alloy monocoque fuselage, improved tail, and a turbocharged G1V-1570C with a geared propeller and the turbocharger removed. Later redesignated YP-23.	Never	Never	0
PA-1	Fighter	Loening Aeronautical Engineering		1922	Never	1
XPS-1	Fighter interceptor	Dayton-Wright Airplane Company		1923	Never	3
P-4 (PW-9)	Pursuit fighter (PW-9)	Boeing	Conflicting designation with PW-8 (XP-4).	1923	1923	158
P-1 (PW-8)	Fighter	Curtiss Aeroplane and Motor Company		1923	1923	202
P-2 Hawk		Curtiss Aeroplane and Motor Company	Engine refit of the P-1	Unknown	Unknown	5
XP-3/XP-3A		Curtiss Aeroplane and Motor Company	Radial-engined version, converted from a P-1A Curtiss, R-1454 engine, later converted to XP-3A. XP-3A XP-3 re-engined with a Pratt & Whitney R-1340-1.	Unknown	Unknown	1?
XP-4 Hawk		Curtiss Aeroplane and Motor Company	P-1A modified with a Packard 1A-1530.	Unknown	Unknown	1?
P-5 Superhawk			Modified P-1A			5 (1 Prototype)
XP-10	Biplane fighter	Curtiss Aeroplane and Motor Company	Rejected due to performance issues and problems with the cooling systems. Retired 1928	Unknown	Unknown	1
XP-13 Viper	Prototype biplane fighter	Thomas-Morse			1929	
XP-7	Experimental fighter	Boeing		1928	Never	1
XP-8	Experimental fighter	Boeing		1928	Never	1
P-12/F4B	Biplane fighter	Boeing		1928	1930	586
XP-15 / XF5B-1	Prototype monoplane fighter	Boeing	Essentially a monoplane version of the Boeing P-12, differing in having the lower wing omitted and in having all-metal construction as well as altered ailerons. The XP-15 had a split-axle undercarriage and a tail wheel.	1930	Never	2
P-16	Two-seat fighter	Berliner-Joyce Aircraft Corporation		1930	1932	26
YP-20	Biplane fighter	Curtiss		Never	Never	1
YP-24	Two-seat fighter	Detroit Lockheed	First fighter to bear Lockheed's name.	1931	Never	1
Y1P-25		Consolidated Aircraft	Further development of Lockheed YP-24 with all-metal wing and Curtiss V-1570-27 Conqueror engine.	Unknown	Never	1
P-26 Peashooter	Fighter	Boeing	First American produced all-metal fighter aircraft and the first pursuit monoplane to enter squadron service with the United States Army Air Corps.	1932	Unknown	151
XP-31 Swift	Experimental monoplane fighter	Curtiss	Despite its innovations, the XP-31 did not offer any advantages compared to its rival the Boeing P-26 Peashooter.	1932	Never	1
P-29	Fighter		Attempt to produce a more advanced version of the P-26. Although slight gains were made in performance, the U.S. Army Air Corps and U.S. Navy did not order the aircraft.	1934	Never	4
P-30 (PB-2)	Fighter	Consolidated Aircraft		1934	Never	60
P-35	Fighter	Seversky		1935	1937	196
AP-1		Seversky	P-35 with a Pratt & Whitney R1830 engine.			1
AP-2		Seversky	From SEV-1-XP			
AP-9		Seversky	Fighter trials aircraft developed in parallel to the AP-7			
P-36 Hawk		Curtiss-Wright		1935	1938	215 + 900 export variants.
XPB-3/XFM-2	Heavy fighter/bomber destroyer	Lockheed Corporation	Cancelled in 1936	Never	Never	0
V-141 / V-143	Fighter	Vought		1936	Never	1
YFM-1 Airacuda	Interceptor	Bell Aircraft	First military aircraft produced by Bell.	1937	1940	13
YP-37		Curtiss-Wright		1937	Never	14
P-39 Airacobra	Fighter	Bell	The P-39 was used by the Soviet Air Force, enabling individual Soviet pilots to collect the highest number of kills attributed to any U.S. fighter type flown by any air force in any conflict.	1938	1941	9,558
P-40 Warhawk	Fighter	Curtiss-Wright	The P-40 design was a further development of the P-36 Hawk.	1938	1939	13,738
P-38 Lightning	Fighter; Fighter-bomber; Aerial reconnaissance	Lockheed Corporation	Incorporated a twin-boom design.	1939	1941	10,037
XP-41	Fighter	Seversky Aircraft		1939	Never	1
P-66 Vanguard	Fighter	Vultee Aircraft		1939	1941	146
P-64	Fighter	North American Aviation	Series of fighters.	1939/1940	Never	13
P-51 Mustang	Fighter	North American Aviation	Used largely in WWII.	1940	1942	15,000+
P-43 Lancer	Fighter	Republic Aviation	A proposed development was the P-44 Rocket.	1940	1941	272
P-44 Rocket	Fighter	Republic Aviation	Proposed P-43 version with Pratt & Whitney R-2180-1 engine	Never	Never	0
XP-46	Fighter	Curtiss-Wright		1941	Never	2
P-47 Thunderbolt	Fighter-bomber	Republic Aviation	Largest single-engine fighter airplane built and flown by any nation during World War II. Features a massive air cooled engine.	1941	1942	15,636
XP-48	Fighter	Douglas Aircraft Company	Cancelled in 1940	Never	Never	0
XP-50	Heavy fighter/Interceptor	Grumman	Developed from the XF5F-1. Entered into a United States Army Air Corps (USAAC) contest for a twin-engine heavy interceptor aircraft. The USAAC placed an order for a prototype on 25 November 1939, designating it XP-50, but it lost the competition to the Lockheed XP-49.	1941	Never	1
XP-60	Fighter	Curtiss-Wright	Developed as a successor to the P-40. All production models were ultimately canceled.	1941	Never	5
XA-26A	Night fighter	Douglas Aircraft Company	A-26 serial no. 41-19505 serving as a prototype night fighter with a crew of two – pilot plus radar-operator/gunner	1942	Never	1
XP-49	Fighter	Lockheed Corporation	Developed from the P-38 Lightning in response to U.S. Army Air Corps proposal 39-775	1942	Never	1
XP-53	Fighter		Curtiss Model 88; derivative of XP-46; cancelled in favor of XP-60 in November 1941. Two built, one converted to the XP-60, the other used as a static test airframe.	Unknown	Unknown	1
P-70 Havoc	Night fighter	Douglas Aircraft Company	In October 1940, the USAAC felt a need for long-range fighters more than attack bombers. As a result, 60 A-20s were converted to P-70 night fighters	Unknown	1942	60
P-59 Airacomet	Fighter	Bell Aircraft	First jet produced in the United States.	1942	Unknown	66
P-61 Black Widow	Night fighter	Northrop	First American specifically designed as a night interceptor.	1942	1944	706
XP-62	Interceptor	Curtiss-Wright		1943	Never	1
XP-54	Fighter	Vultee Aircraft	For U.S. Army Air Corps request R40C.	1943	Never	2
XP-55 Ascender	Fighter	Curtiss-Wright	Used an unconventional pusher configuration. For U.S. Army Air Corps request R40C.	1943	Never	3
XP-57	Fighter	Tucker Aviation Corporation		Never	Never	0
XP-71	Heavy fighter; Escort fighter; Bomber-destroyer/interceptor	Curtiss-Wright	Cancelled in 1943	Never	Never	0
P-75 Eagle	Heavy fighter	Fisher Body Division of General Motors		1943	Never	14
P-73/D-2	Fighter-bomber	Hughes Aircraft		1943	Never	1
XF8B	Fighter	Boeing		1944	Never	3
XP-67 Bat/Moonbat	Interceptor	McDonnell Aircraft		1944	Never	1
XP-77	Experimental fighter	Bell Aircraft	Did not meet its projected performance.	1944	Never	2
P-80 (F-80) Shooting Star	Jet fighter	Lockheed Corporation	America's first successful turbojet-powered fighter.	1944	1945	1,715
XP-79	Interceptor	Northrop Corporation	USAAF project number MX-365. A rocket/jet-powered flying wing	1945	Never	1
XP-81	Escort fighter	Consolidated Vultee Aircraft Corporation	Designed to combine the use of a turbojet and a turboprop.	1945	Never	2
F-82/P-82 Twin Mustang	Long-range escort fighter; Night fighter; All-weather interceptor	North American Aviation	Last American piston-engine fighter ordered into production by the United States Air Force.	1945	1946	272/273
XP-83	Escort fighter	Bell	It was quickly outclassed due to the nature of post-WWII aviation developing rapidly.	1945	Never	2
F-84 Thunderjet	Fighter-bomber	Republic Aviation	Initially sent to escort B-29s on long-range missions over North Korea, it excelled as a close air support and daytime interdiction strike aircraft. First USAF jet fighter able to carry a tactical atomic weapon.	1946	1947	7,524
F-86 Sabre	Fighter aircraft	North American Aviation	Used extensively during the Korean War. Built for a 1944 request for a single-seat high-altitude fighter. Derived from the FJ Fury.	1947	1949	6,353, at least
XF-85 Goblin	Parasite fighter	McDonnell Aircraft	Part of a conceptualized idea for Airborne aircraft carriers.	1948	Never	2
XF-87 (XP-87) Blackhawk	Interceptor	Curtiss-Wright	Designed as a replacement for the World War II–era P-61 Black Widow, the XF-87 lost the competition to the Northrop F-89. Its company's last aircraft project.	1948	Never	2
XF-88 Voodoo	Escort fighter	McDonnell Aircraft	Developed into the supersonic F-101 Voodoo.	1948	Never	2
F-89 Scorpion	Interceptor	Northrop Corporation	First fighter equipped with guided missile ability.	1948	1950	1,052 (Including 2 Prototypes)
XF-92	Experimental point-defense interceptor	Convair	Led Convair to use the delta-wing on a number of designs, including the F-102 Delta Dagger, F-106 Delta Dart, B-58 Hustler, the US Navy's F2Y Sea Dart as well as the VTOL FY Pogo.	1948	Never	1
F-86D/K/L or YF-95 "Sabre Dog"	All-weather fighter-interceptor	North American Aviation		1949	1951	2,847
XF-90	Fighter	Lockheed	Built in response to a United States Air Force requirement for a long-range penetration fighter and bomber escort.	1949	Never	2
F-94/YF-97 Starfire	All-weather interceptor	Lockheed Corporation	First jet-powered all-weather fighter to enter combat during the Korean War.	1949	1950	855
F-98	Air-to-air missile	Hughes Aircraft	A brief designation for the AIM-4 Falcon.	1949	1956	
F-99 Bomarc	Surface-to-air missile	Boeing Pilotless Aircraft Division	A brief designation for the CIM-10 BOMARC. First operational long-range SAM and the first operational pulse doppler aviation radar, it was the only SAM deployed by the United States Air Force.		1959	
YF-93	Fighter	North American Aviation		1950	Never	2
F-84F/XF-96 Thunderstreak	Fighter-bomber	Republic Aviation	Intended to be a relatively simple upgrade to the F-84 Thunderjet to make it more competitive with the F-86 Sabre.	1950	1954	3,428
F-100 Super Sabre	Fighter; Fighter-bomber	North American Aviation	Capable of supersonic speed in level flight.	1953	1954	2,294
F-102 Delta Dagger	Interceptor	Convair	World's first supersonic all-weather jet interceptor and the USAF's first operational delta-wing aircraft.	1953	1956	1,000
F-101 Voodoo	Fighter aircraft; Fighter-bomber	McDonnell Aircraft	First designed at the end of WWII as a penetration fighter, it was adapted for close air support in 1954.	1954	1957	807
F-104 Starfighter	Air superiority fighter; Fighter-bomber	Lockheed		1954	1958	2,578
XF-104 Starfighter	Interceptor prototype	Lockheed Corporation		1954	Never	2
F-105 Thunderchief	Fighter-bomber	Republic Aviation	Mach 2-capable	1955	1958	833
XF-84H Thunderscreech	Experimental fighter	Republic Aviation	Its name, Thunderscreech, is a reference to its extremely loud supersonic propeller.	1955	Never	2
F-106 Delta Dart	All-weather fighter interceptor	Convair	Developed from the F-102 Delta Dagger. Originally designated F-102B.	1956	1959	342 (2 prototypes, 277 F-106As, 63 F-106Bs)
XF-103	Interceptor	Republic Aviation	Canceled at mock-up stage. Request Issued by the USAF in 1949 for an advanced supersonic interceptor to equip the Air Defense Command.	Never	Never	0
F-107	Fighter-bomber	North American Aviation	North American Aviation's entry in a United States Air Force tactical fighter-bomber design competition of the 1950s, based on the F-100 Super Sabre. Originally designated F-100B	1956	Never	3
XF-108 Rapier	Interceptor	North American Aviation		Never	Never	0 (1 Mock-up)
F-110 Spectre/F-4 Phantom II	Interceptor; Fighter-bomber	McDonnell Aircraft Corporation; McDonnell Douglas	Used extensively during Vietnam. The F-4, like other interceptors of its time, was initially designed without an internal cannon. Later models incorporated an M61 Vulcan. It set 15 world records for in-flight performance, including an absolute speed record and an absolute altitude record.	1958	1963 (USAF)	5,195
NF-104A	Aerospace trainer	Lockheed Aircraft Corporation		1963	1963	3
CL-1200 Lancer / X-27	Interceptor	Lockheed Corporation	Cancelled at mock-up stage	Never	Never	0
YF-12	Interceptor	Lockheed Corporation	Mach 3+ Capable. Developed during the late 1950s and early 1960s as a potential replacement for the F-106 Delta Dart. Related to the SR-71 and A-12.	1963	Never	3
F-12C	Strategic reconnaissance	Lockheed Corporation	Unofficial cover designation for the SR-71	1964	1966	32
F-111 Aardvark	Attack aircraft; Strategic bomber; Reconnaissance; Electronic warfare	General Dynamics		1964	1967	536 (total) 76 (FB-111)
EF-111A Raven	Electronic warfare	General Dynamics/ Grumman		1977	1983	42
F-117 Nighthawk	Stealth attack aircraft	Lockheed Corporation	Previously a black project.	1981	1983	64
XF-109 / D-188A	VTOL fighter	Bell Aircraft Corporation	Cancelled 1961	Never	Never	0 (1 Mock-up)
	Fighter concept	Fairchild Aircraft/Hiller Aircraft	Fairchild/Hiller's entry for the F-X program that later resulted in McDonnell Douglas's F-15 Eagle			
NA-335	Fighter concept	North American Aviation	North American's entry for the F-X program that later resulted in McDonnell Douglas's F-15 Eagle			
F-15 Eagle	Air superiority	McDonnell Douglas; Boeing Defense, Space & Security	Built to counter the newly-appearing MiG-25. Often known as one of the most successful fighter projects.	1972	1976	1,198
F-16 Fighting Falcon	Multirole fighter, air superiority fighter	General Dynamics (1974–1993); Lockheed Corporation(1993–1995); Lockheed Martin (1995–present)	Designed as an air superiority day fighter, it evolved into a successful all-weather multirole aircraft.	1974	1978	4,604 (As of June 2018)
YF-17 Cobra	Prototype fighter aircraft	Northrop	The YF-17 was the culmination of several Northrop designs, beginning with the N-102 Fang; continuing through the F-5 family.	1974	Never	2
F-15E Strike Eagle	Multirole strike fighter	McDonnell Douglas(1985–1997); Boeing Defense, Space & Security(1997–present)	Evolution of the F-15 Eagle	1986	1988 1989 (IOC)	525
F-15EX Eagle II	Multirole strike fighter	Boeing Defense, Space & Security	Derived from the F-15E Strike Eagle, and greatly improved.	2024	2021	
NF-15B STOL/MTD	Technology demonstrator and research aircraft	McDonnell Douglas	Modified F-15 built for STOL.	1988	1991	1
F-16XL	Experimental fighter	General Dynamics	Entered the United States Air Force's (USAF) Enhanced Tactical Fighter(ETF) competition in 1981 and lost to the F-15E Strike Eagle. The two prototypes were shelved until turned over to NASA for additional aeronautical research in 1988. Both aircraft were fully retired in 2009 and stored at Edwards Air Force Base.	1982	Never	2
YF-22	Stealth fighter/technology demonstrator	Lockheed / Boeing / General Dynamics	Competed against the YF-23 in the Advanced Tactical Fighter (ATF) program. Further developed into the F-22.	1990	Never	2
YF-23	Stealth fighter/ technology demonstrator	Northrop/McDonnell Douglas	Competed against the YF-22 in the Advanced Tactical Fighter (ATF) program. Unofficially nicknamed Black Widow II.	1990	Never	2
X-62 (NF-16D) VISTA	Experimental	General Dynamics (later Lockheed Martin); Calspan	VISTA stands for Variable stability In-flight Simulator Test Aircraft.	1992	Never	1
F-22 Raptor	Air superiority fighter	Lockheed Martin Aeronautics; Boeing Defense, Space & Security	The aircraft was designed as an air superiority fighter, but also incorporates ground attack, electronic warfare, and signals intelligence capabilities.	1997	2005	187 + 8 test Aircraft
FB-22	Stealth bomber	Lockheed Martin	Proposal cancelled, developed from the F-22.	Never	Never	0
F-35A Lightning II	Multirole fighter	Lockheed Martin	From the Lockheed Martin X-35, which in 2001 beat the Boeing X-32 to win the Joint Strike Fighter (JSF) program.	2006	2016 (USAF)	1,000+ (in total)

== Navy, Marine Corps and Coast Guard ==
This list includes aircraft operated by the United States Navy, United States Marine Corps and United States Coast Guard.
Name	Role	Manufacturer	Notes	Year of first flight	Introduction	Number built
VE-7 "Bluebird"	Fighter/trainer	Lewis & Vought Corporation	First United States Navy fighter aircraft. Used as a racer and trainer. In 1922, a VE-7 became the first airplane to take off from an American aircraft carrier.	1917	Unknown	128
VE-9		Lewis & Vought Corporation	2 converted from VE-7 for U.S. Army; 22 built for the U.S. Army, 17 built for the U.S. Navy.	Unknown	Unknown	24 (US Army) 17 (USN)
HA	Fighter/mail plane	Curtiss Aeroplane and Motor Company		1918	Unknown	6
18T Kirkham	Two-seated fighter triplane	Curtiss Engineering Corporation	Intended to protect bombing aircraft over France.	1918	1919	Unknown
M-8	Monoplane fighter	Loening Aeronautical Engineering		1918	Never	55
MB-3	Fighter	Thomas-Morse Aircraft & Boeing		1919	1919	265
TS	Naval fighter	Naval Aircraft Factory & Curtiss Aeroplane and Motor Company		Unknown	1922	46
XF10C	Carrier fighter-bomber	Curtiss Aeroplane and Motor Company	O2C-2 re-engined with a R-1510 engine, temporarily designated XS3C-1	Unknown	Unknown	Unknown
F6C Hawk	Carrier-borne/land-based fighter	Curtiss Aeroplane and Motor Company		Unknown	1925	75
Model 83		Boeing	One prototype with spreader-bar landing gear and 425 hp Pratt & Whitney R-1340-8 engine, later designated XF4B-1 for Navy evaluation.			1
Model 89		Boeing	One prototype with split-axle undercarriage and provision for a 500 lb bomb on ventral rack, later designated XF4B-1 for Navy evaluation.			1
FU	Fighter	Vought		???	1927	20
FB	Carrier fighter	Boeing	Conflicting designation with PW-8 (XP-4).	1923	1923	158
F3B	Carrier-based fighter-bomber	Boeing	Production version, the F3B-1, was designated Model 77.	1928	1928	74
XF6B / XBFB	Carrier-based fighter-bomber	Boeing	Boeing's last Biplane design for the United States Navy.	1933	Never	1
F2B	Carrier fighter (FB series)	Boeing	Grounded after just 4.5 hours of flight testing.	1926	1928	33
NF-1	Fighter prototype	Seversky	Single-seat fighter prototype for U.S. Navy evaluation			1
F7C Seahawk	Fighter	Curtiss Aeroplane and Motor Company		1927	Never	17
XFG & XF2G	Fighter	Eberhart Aeroplane and Motor Company		1927	Never	1
F8C Falcon/Helldiver	Carrier fighter-bomber	Curtiss Aeroplane and Motor Company	Part of the Curtiss Falcon family. Four F8C-1 built in 1928	1928	Unknown	153
P-12/F4B	Biplane Fighter	Boeing		1928	1930	586
XF2U	Fighter	Vought		1929	Never	1
XF5B	Prototype monoplane fighter	Boeing	Essentially a monoplane version of the Boeing P-12, differing in having the lower wing omitted and in having all-metal construction as well as altered ailerons. The XP-15 had a split-axle undercarriage and a tail wheel.	1930	Never	2
XFJ	Naval fighter	Berliner-Joyce		1931	Never	?
XFD	Fighter	Douglas Aircraft Company	A victim of changing requirements, no production was undertaken.	1933	Never	1
XF2J	Two-seat carrier-based fighter	Berliner-Joyce		1933	Never	1
XFT	Fighter	Northrop Corporation		1933	Never	1
XF7B	Fighter		Attempt to produce a more advanced version of the P-26. Although slight gains were made in performance, the U.S. Army Air Corps and U.S. Navy did not order the aircraft.	1934	Never	4
XFL	Fighter	Loening Aeronautical Engineering	Won a 1933 competition, but Loening was busy building other aircraft, so the contract was canceled.	Never	Never	0
BF2C Goshawk	Carrier-based Fighter and fighter-bomber	Curtiss Aeroplane and Motor Company	1930s naval biplane aircraft that saw limited success and was part of a long line of Hawk Series airplanes made by the Curtiss Aeroplane and Motor Company for the American military, and for export as the Model 68 Hawk III.	???	1933	166
F9C Sparrowhawk	Parasite fighter	Curtiss Aeroplane and Motor Company	A specialized aircraft part of the conceptualized plan for Airborne Aircraft Carriers. Carried by the United States Navy airships USS Akron and Macon.	1931	1931	7+
FF	Naval fighter	Grumman	First carrier aircraft with retractable landing gear. The FF-1 was Grumman's first complete aircraft design for the US Navy. Considered highly successful and setting a standard for Grumman Aircraft.	1931	1933	85
F11C Goshawk	Carrier-based fighter and fighter-bomber	Curtiss Aeroplane and Motor Company	Naval biplane fighter aircraft that saw limited success	1932	1932	30
XF12C-1	Prototype parasol-wing fighter	Curtiss Aeroplane and Motor Company	Powered by a 625 hp (466 kW) R-1510-92 radial, later converted into biplane as the XS4C-1.	1933	Never	1
F2F	Naval fighter	Grumman	Designed for both carrier- and land-based operation, it served as a standard for the United States Navy between 1936 and 1940.	1933	1935	55
XF3U	Fighter	Vought		1933	Never	1
XF3J	Carrier fighter.	Berliner-Joyce		1934	Never	1
XF13C	Fighter	Curtiss Aeroplane and Motor Company		1934	Never	3
SBC Helldiver	Dive bomber	Curtiss Aeroplane and Motor Company		1935	1938	257
F3F	Naval fighter	Grumman	Last biplane to be delivered to any American military air arm	1935	1936	147
F2A Buffalo	Fighter	Brewster Aeronautical Corporation	Won a competition against the Grumman F4F Wildcat in 1939 to become the U.S. Navy's first monoplane fighter aircraft. Although superior to the Grumman F3F biplane it replaced, and early F4Fs, the Buffalo was largely obsolete when the United States entered the war, being unstable and overweight, especially when compared to the Japanese Mitsubishi A6M Zero.	1937	1939	509
F4F Wildcat	Carrier-based fighter aircraft	Grumman	First used by the British in the North Atlantic, the Wildcat was the only effective fighter available to the United States Navy & Marine Corps in the Pacific Theater during the early part of the Second World War. The Brewster Buffalo was withdrawn in favor of the Wildcat and replaced as aircraft became available.	1937	1940	7,885
F4U Corsair	Carrier-based fighter-bomber	Chance Vought	Early problems with carrier landings and logistics led to it being eclipsed by the Grumman F6F Hellcat.	1940	1942	12,571
XF5F Skyrocket	Naval fighter	Grumman		1940	Never	1
XFL Airabonita	Carrier-based interceptor aircraft	Bell	Developed from the P-39 Airacobra	1940	Never	1
F6F Hellcat	Naval fighter	Grumman	Designed to replace the F4F Wildcat and to counter the Japanese Mitsubishi A6M Zero; it was the United States Navy's dominant fighter in the second half of the Pacific War. It prevailed over its faster competitor, the Vought F4U Corsair, which initially had problems with visibility and carrier landings.	1942	1943	12,275
YF2L-1 Airacomet	Fighter/Jet trainer	Bell Aircraft	First jet produced in the United States.	1942	Unknown	66
F7F Tigercat	Heavy fighter	Grumman	Saw action as a night fighter and attack aircraft during the Korean War. The aircraft was only used in combat once, when Marine Corps night fighter squadron VMF(N)-513 flying F7F-3Ns saw action in the early stages of the Korean War, shooting down two Polikarpov Po-2 biplanes.	1943	1944	364
XF5U	Fighter	Vought	Cancelled in 1947	1943	Never	2
XF8B	Fighter	Boeing		1944	Never	3
P-80 (F-80) Shooting Star	Jet fighter	Lockheed Corporation	America's first successful turbojet-powered fighter.	1944	1945	1,715
F8F Bearcat	Fighter	Grumman	Grumman Aircraft's last piston-engined fighter aircraft.	1944	1945	1,265
FR Fireball	Fighter	Ryan Aeronautical	Navy's first aircraft with a jet engine.	1944	1945	71
FH Phantom	Carrier-based fighter	McDonnell Aircraft		1945	1947	62
F2G Corsair	Carrier-based fighter aircraft	Goodyear Aircraft	Developed from the Vought F4U Corsair.	1945	1945	10 + 1 Prototype
FH Phantom	Carrier-based fighter aircraft	McDonnell Aircraft	First purely jet-powered aircraft to land on an American aircraft carrier in 1946.	1945	1947	62
FJ-1 Fury	Fighter	North American Aviation	First jet aircraft in USN service to serve at sea under operational conditions. Also the first American jet fighter to employ a single, straight ram duct in its nose.	1946	1947/1948	30 + 3 Prototypes
F6U Pirate	Fighter	Chance Vought	Vought's first jet fighter,	1946	Never	33
XF2R Dark Shark	Fighter	Ryan Aeronautical	Combined turboprop and turbojet propulsion.	1946	Never	1
F-9 (F9F) Panther	Carrier-based fighter-bomber	Grumman	First jet-powered fighter aircraft operated by the United States Navy and Grumman's first jet fighter. Development commenced in the final months of World War II to harness the recent innovation of the jet engine	1947	1949	1,385
F-2 (F2H) Banshee	Carrier-based fighter	McDonnell Aircraft	The only jet-powered fighter to ever be deployed by the Royal Canadian Navy.	1947	1948	895
F7U Cutlass	Naval multirole fighter	Chance Vought	First tailless production fighter in the United States as well as United States Navy's first jet equipped with swept wings and the first to be designed with afterburners.	1948	1951	320
F-10 (F3D) Skyknight	Fighter	Douglas Aircraft Company	Designed in response to a requirement issued by the United States Navy in 1945 for a jet-powered, radar-equipped, carrier-based night fighter.	1948	1951	265
F-1 (FJ-2/3) Fury	Fighter	North American Aviation	Developed as a navalised F-86.	1951	1954	741
F-6 (F4D) Skyray	Fighter aircraft	Douglas Aircraft Company	The last fighter produced by the Douglas Aircraft Company prior to its merge with McDonnell Aircraft to become McDonnell Douglas.	1951	1956	422
F-3 (F3H) Demon	Carrier-based all-weather interceptor	McDonnell Aircraft	The first swept wing jet fighter and the only single-engined carrier-based fighter McDonnell produced. Provided the basis for the F-4 Phantom.	1951	1956	519
F-9 (F9F-6/7/9) Cougar	Fighter	Grumman		1951	1952	1,988
XF10F Jaguar	Prototype swing-wing fighter aircraft	Grumman	Although it never entered service, its research paved the way towards the General Dynamics F-111 and Grumman's F-14 Tomcat.	1952	Never	1
F-7 (F2Y) Sea Dart	Seaplane fighter	Convair	The program was canceled after a series of unsatisfactory results and a tragic accident in which test pilot Charles E. Richbourg was killed when the Sea Dart disintegrated in midair.	1953	Never	5
F-1E/F (FJ-4) Fury	Fighter	North American Aviation		1954	Unknown	374
XFV	Tailsitting Experimental VTOL fighter aircraft	Lockheed Corporation		1954	Never	1
XFY Pogo	Experimental VTOL fighter aircraft	Convair	Cold War-era vehicle.	1954	Never	1
F-11 (F11F) Tiger	Fighter	Grumman	Work on what would become the Tiger commended in 1952 as a design study, internally designated G-98, to improve the F9F-6/7 Cougar.	1954	1956	204
F-8 (F8U) Crusader	Fighter	Vought		1955	1957	1,219
F5D Skylancer	Fighter aircraft	Douglas Aircraft Company	A development of the F4D Skyray jet fighter for the United States Navy. Starting out as the F4D-2N, an all-weather version of the Skyray.	1956	Never	4
F11F-1F/F-11B Super Tiger	Fighter	Grumman	Company Designation Grumman(G)-98J	1956	Never	2
XF8U-3 Crusader III	Fighter	Chance Vought		1958	Never	5
F-110 Spectre			Redesignated and renamed to F-4 Phantom II in 1962			
F-4 Phantom II	Interceptor, fighter-bomber	McDonnell Aircraft Corporation McDonnell Douglas	Used extensively during Vietnam.The F-4, like other interceptors of its time, was initially designed without an internal cannon. Later models incorporated an M61 Vulcan. It set 15 world records for in-flight performance, including an absolute speed record and an absolute altitude record.	1958	1960/1961 (USN)	5,195
F-5 Freedom Fighter/Tiger II	Light fighter	Northrop Corporation	Popular export aircraft	1959	1964	2,603
F-111B	Interceptor	General Dynamics and Grumman	Planned as a follow-on to the F-4 Phantom II for the United States Navy (USN).	1965	Never	7
CL-1400		Lockheed Corporation	Proposed CL-1200 for the Navy.	Never	Never	0
XF3L / D-188A	VTOL fighter	Bell Aircraft Corporation	Cancelled 1961	Never	Never	0 (1 Mock-up)
F6D Missileer	Fleet defense fighter	Douglas Aircraft Company	Designed in response to a 1959 United States Navy requirement.	Never	Never	0
XFV-12	VTOL fighter	Rockwell International	Intended to combine the speed and armament of the F-4 Phantom II with V/STOL capabilities.	Unknown	Never	1
F-14 Tomcat	Interceptor; air superiority; multirole	Grumman	Developed for the United States Navy's Naval Fighter Experimental (VFX) program after the collapse of the General Dynamics-Grumman F-111B project.	1970	1974	712
F/A-18 Hornet	Multirole fighter	McDonnell Douglas (1974–1997) Northrop (1974–1994) Boeing (1997–2000)	Used extensively by the U.S Navy	1978	1983	1,480
F/A-18E/F Super Hornet	Carrier-based multirole fighter	McDonnell Douglas(1995–1997) Boeing Defense, Space & Security(1997–present)		1995	1999 2001 (IOC)	≥632 as of April 2020
F-35 Lightning II	Multirole fighter	Lockheed Martin	From the Lockheed Martin X-35, which in 2001 beat the Boeing X-32 to win the Joint Strike Fighter (JSF) program. USMC use F-35B; USN use F-35C.	2006	(F-35B) 2015 (USMC) (F-35C) 2019 (USN)	1,000+ (in total)
F/A-XX	Program/project	None	Built for as part of Next Generation Air Dominance (NGAD) program	Not yet	Not yet	Not yet

== Foreign-built fighters ==
Name	Role	Origini	Manufacturer	Notes	Year of first flight	Introduction	Number built
R.11	Heavy fighter	France	Caudron		1916	1918	370
S.E.5	Single-seat fighter	United Kingdom	Royal Aircraft Factory		1916	1917	5,205
Camel	Biplane fighter	United Kingdom	Sopwith Aviation Company		1916	1917	5,490
D.VII	Fighter		Fokker-Flugzeugwerke		1918	Unknown	~3,300
D.VIII	Fighter		Fokker-Flugzeugwerke		1918		~381
PW-5	Fighter		Fokker-Flugzeugwerke		1921	1922	22
F-21 Kfir	Fighter-bomber, multirole fighter	Israel	Israel Aircraft Industries		1973	1976	220+
YF-110B		Soviet Union	Mikoyan-Gurevich	Captured MiG-21F-13 under Have Doughnut.			
YF-110C		China	Chengdu Aircraft Corporation/Guizhou Aircraft Industry Corporation	Captured J-7B.			
YF-110D		Soviet Union	Mikoyan-Gurevich	Captured MiG-21MF under Have Doughnut.			
YF-110E/L/M				Captured aircraft of unknown type under Have Phoenix.			
YF-112C/D			Sukhoi	East German Su-22M4.			
YF-113A			Mikoyan-Gurevich	Captured MiG-17F under Have Drill.			
YF-113B			Mikoyan-Gurevich	Captured MiG-23BN.			
YF-113C			Shenyang	Captured J-5 under Have Privilege, later reused for unknown type under Have Phoenix.			
YF-113D			Mikoyan-Gurevich	Captured MiG-23MS.			
YF-113G				Possible USAF black project.			
YF-113H				Captured aircraft of unknown type under Have Phoenix.			

== Export-only fighters ==
Name	Role	Manufacturer	Notes	Year of first flight	Introduction	Number built
Model 100A/D/E/F	Civil application and experimental	Boeing	Model 100E exported to Siamese Air Force, two built, one later transferred to the Japanese Navy	1929	Unknown	9
Hawk III	Fighter-bomber	Curtiss	Export version of BF2C-1			137
Hawk IV	Fighter-bomber	Curtiss	Export version of BF2C-1			1
Model 218		Boeing	Prototype of the P-12E/F4B-3 variant, after evaluation sold to the Chinese Air Force.			
Model 256		Boeing	Export version of the F4B-4 for Brazilian Navy			14
Model 267		Boeing	Export version for Brazil with an F4B-3 fuselage and P-12E wings.			9
P-400	Export fighter	Bell	Export model of the P-39, uses a 20mm Hispano cannon rather than the 37mm.	Unknown	Unknown	Unknown
CW-21	Fighter	Curtiss-Wright Corporation		1938	1939	62
F-86K	Fighter	North American Aviation	NATO version of F-86D			
CF-101 Voodoo	Interceptor aircraft	McDonnell	Canadian version of McDonnell F-101 Voodoo	1954	1961	132
CF-104 Starfighter	Interceptor aircraft, fighter-bomber	Canadair	Modified version of the Lockheed F-104 Starfighter supersonic fighter aircraft built in Canada by Canadair under licence	1961	1962	200
F-104S Starfighter	Interceptor	Aeritalia	Licensed production Italian version of the Lockheed F-104 Starfighter.	1966	1969	246
F-111C	Fighter-bomber & reconnaissance aircraft	General Dynamics	Nicknamed the "Pig." An export variant for Australia.	1968	1973	28
F-111K	Tactical Strike Low-Level Interdiction Reconnaissance	General Dynamics	The project was initiated in 1965 following the cancellation of the BAC TSR-2 strike aircraft, producing an aircraft for the specific needs of the United Kingdom.	Never	Never	0
F-4K Phantom	Carrier-based interceptor	McDonnell Douglas	Export variant for Royal Navy with significant amount of UK equipment	1966	1968	52 (incl 2 prototypes)
F-4M Phantom	Interceptor	McDonnell Douglas	Export variant for Royal Air Force with significant amount of UK equipment	1967	1969	118 (incl 2 prototypes)
CF-5/CF-116/NF-5 Freedom Fighter	Fighter-bomber	Canadair	Canadian licensed-built Northrop F-5 Freedom Fighter. In service with the Royal Netherlands Air Force as the NF-5.	1968	1968	240
F-8E(FN) Crusader	Carrier-based interceptor	Vought	Export variant for French Navy	1964	1964	43 (incl 1 prototype)
F-15J/DJ	Air superiority fighter	Mitsubishi Heavy Industries McDonnell Douglas	Licensed built F-15 for Japan	1980	1982	213
CF-18/CF-188	Multirole fighter	McDonnell Douglas	Canadian version of F/A-18	1982	1982	138
F-15I Ra'am			F-15E Strike Eagle for Israel			
F-15K Slam Eagle			Derivative of the Strike Eagle for the Republic of Korea Air Force			
F-15S			Derivative of the Strike Eagle for the Royal Saudi Air Force			
F-15SA			Advanced version of the F-15S. Saudi Advanced.			84
F-15SG (F-15T)			Derivative of the Strike Eagle for the Republic of Singapore Air Force.			
F-15QA			Qatar Advanced.			
F-15IA			Israel Advanced. Based on the F-15EX			
F-15H			Hellas. Proposed variant for the Hellenic AF.			
F-15GA			German Advanced. Proposed variant for the Luftwaffe. Chose F-35s and Eurofighter Typhoons instead.			
F-16I Sufa			For Israel			
F-16IN			For the Indian MRCA competition for the Indian Air Force, Lockheed Martin offered the F-16IN Super Viper.			
F-35I Adir			For Israel			

== Experimental fighters not for military service ==
Does not include those with a predesignated service had the aircraft been implemented. For example, the F2Y Sea Dart is not listed below as it was intended for naval service.

Name	Role	Manufacturer	Notes	Year of first flight	Introduction	Number built
Pigeon-Fraser	Pursuit/fighter	George N. Albree	First pursuit aircraft project for the United States Government.	1917	Never	3
TM-23	Biplane fighter	Thomas-Morse Aircraft		1924	Never	1
HT-2 Speed Scout	Experimental observation fighter seaplane	Burgess Company		1917?	Never	8
Model S	Fighter	Curtiss Aeroplane and Motor Company	Curtiss' first attempt at a fast and maneuverable single-seat fighter. First triplane in service in the United States		1917	
Orenco D	Fighter	Orenco/Curtiss Aircraft	First fighter type of completely indigenous design (as opposed to foreign types or American-built versions of foreign types) to enter US military service	1919	Unknown	54
YP-27	Proposal	Consolidated Aircraft	Proposed variant of Y1P-25	Never	Never	0
Y1P-28	Proposal	Consolidated Aircraft	Proposed variant of Y1P-25	Never	Never	0
XP-33	Proposal		Proposed version; unbuilt			0
MB-9	Fighter	Thomas-Morse Aircraft	Quickly abandoned project	1922	Never	1
XFH	Fighter	Hall Aluminum Company	First fighter with a semi-monocoque metal fuselage.	1929	Never	1
XP-18	Proposed monoplane biplane fighter	Curtiss	Ordered in 1930. Cancelled before any were built.	Never	Never	0
XP-19	Proposed monoplane biplane fighter	Curtiss	Design was cancelled before any were built.	Never	Never	0
XP-52/XP-59	Cancelled fighter project	Bell Aircraft Corporation	When the project was canceled the designation XP-59A was used as a cover for a secret jet fighter prototype, which would enter production as the P-59 Airacomet.	Never	Never	0
XP-56 Black Bullet	Fighter	Northrop Corporation		1943	Never	2
XP-58 Chain Lightning	Heavy fighter	Lockheed	Plagued by technical problems with its engines that led to the project's cancellation.	1944		1
XP-68 Tornado	Fighter	Vultee Aircraft	World War II-era high-altitude interceptor aircraft. Cancelled project.	Never	Never	0
XP-72	Fighter-interceptor	Republic Aviation	Development of the P-47 Thunderbolt.	1944	Never	2
XF-91 Thunderceptor	Prototype interceptor	Republic Aviation		1949	Never	2
F-20/F-5G Tigershark	Fighter aircraft	Northrop Corporation	An evolution of the F-5	1982	Never	3
AFTI/F-111A Aardvark	Research aircraft	General Dynamics/Boeing		1985	1985	1
CL-288	Conceptual Interceptor aircraft	Lockheed Corporation		Never	Never	0
X-32 JSF	Experimental stealth fighter	Boeing	Beaten by the Lockheed Martin X-35 in the Joint Strike Fighter (JSF) program.	2000	Never	1
X-35 JSF	Concept demonstrator aircraft (CDA) & experimental stealth fighter	Lockheed Martin Aeronautics	Further developed into the F-35 Lightning II in the Joint Strike Fighter (JSF) program.	2000	Never	2
F-19			Speculative designation. Skipped design number.			

== See also ==
- Boeing F-47
- List of fighter aircraft
- Lists of military aircraft of the United States
- List of United States Tri-Service aircraft designations
