= Thomas-Morse TM-24 =

TM-24
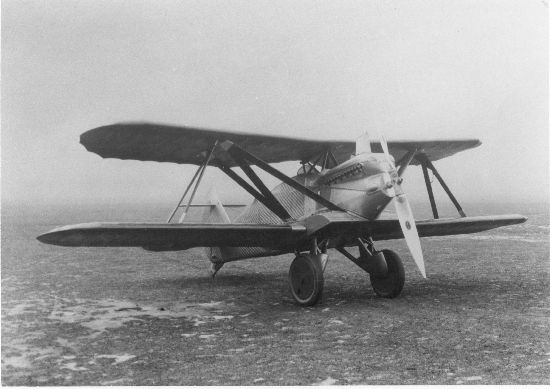

General information
- Type: Observation aircraft
- National origin: United States of America
- Manufacturer: Thomas-Morse Aircraft
- Designer: B Douglas Thomas
- Number built: 1

History
- First flight: 1925

The Thomas-Morse TM-24 was a prototype American two-seat observation aircraft of the 1920s. A single example was built in 1925, but no production followed.

== Design and development ==
Thomas-Morse Aircraft had decided to specialize in all-metal aircraft after it lost an order for 200 MB-3 fighters to Boeing, who had offered a much lower bid. Thomas Morse's chief designer, B. Douglas Thomas produced a series of all-metal aircraft, flying the unsuccessful MB-9 fighter and MB-10 trainer in 1921, and selling two R-5 racing aircraft to the United States Army Air Service in 1922. In 1924, Thomas-Morse flew the TM-23, a single-seat biplane fighter, which was again a failure. Despite undergoing major redesign in an attempt to improve performance and handling it failed to obtain any orders.

In 1924, Thomas designed a single-engined two-seat observation aircraft, the TM-24, in a further attempt to find success with all-metal construction. In an attempt to improve maneuverability, the TM-24 had a short fuselage, with the aircraft being little longer than the single-seat TM-23. Like the TM-23, the TM-24's fuselage was covered in corrugated aluminum skin. The crew of two sat in separate tandem cockpits. The upper wing was much smaller than the lower wing, having a wingspan 5 feet shorter. The wings were braced by a single "N"-strut and an inverted "V"-strut on each side. Additional auxiliary tail surfaces were mounted on the aircraft's fin, above the main tailplane, which acted as trim tabs. The aircraft was powered by a 440 horsepower (330 kW) Curtiss D12 water-cooled V12 engine driving a two-bladed propeller and cooled by radiators located in fairings in the lower wing-roots.

The TM-24 flew in early 1925. It was delivered to McCook Field for testing by the Army Air Service in February that year. While testing indicated that performance was good, the aircraft's landing speed was considered too high, and its rudder was masked if the observer stood up in his cockpit to use his machine gun. The TM-24 was also considered frail by the testers. Further development was abandoned and the prototype was dismantled at McCook Field. Thomas-Morse lost $46,000 on the project.

== Specifications ==
Data from General Dynamics Aircraft and their Predecessors

General characteristics

- Crew: 2
- Length: 20 ft 5 in (6.22 m)
- Upper wingspan: 25 ft 0 in (7.62 m)
- Lower wingspan: 30 ft 1 in (9.17 m)
- Wing area: 237 sq ft (22.0 m^{2})
- Empty weight: 1,969 lb (893 kg)
- Gross weight: 3,470 lb (1,574 kg)
- Powerplant: 1 × Curtiss D-12 water-cooled V12 engine, 440 hp (330 kW)

Performance

- Maximum speed: 143 mph (230 km/h, 124 kn) at sea level
- Cruise speed: 114 mph (183 km/h, 99 kn)
- Endurance: 2 hr 45 min
- Service ceiling: 15,600 ft (4,800 m)
- Rate of climb: 1,178 ft/min (5.98 m/s)
