= Thomas-Morse MB-4 =

1920s American mailplane

MB-4
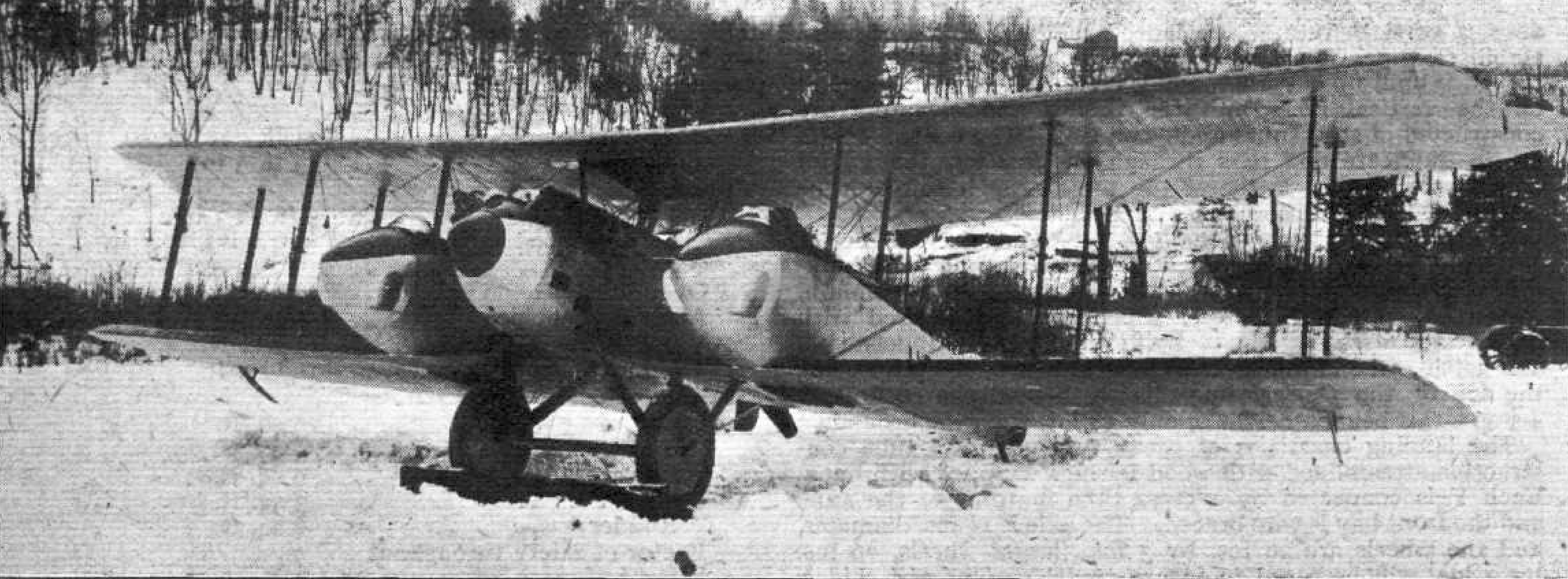

General information
- Type: Mail plane
- National origin: United States of America
- Manufacturer: Thomas-Morse Aircraft
- Number built: at least 2

History
- First flight: 1920
- Developed from: Thomas-Morse MB-3

The Thomas-Morse MB-4 was a prototype American mailplane of the 1920s. It was of unusual design, being a biplane with twin fuselages housing the crew of two and a central nacelle which carried the aircraft's twin engines in a push-pull configuration.

== Design and development ==
The MB-4 was designed to meet a June 1919 specification from the United States Post Office Department for a two- or three-engined mailplane, required to carry 1,500 lb (682 kg) of mail on a single engine. Thomas-Morse chose to use as much as possible of its existing Thomas-Morse MB-3 fighter in order to reduce costs, using two engineless MB-3 fuselages to carry the crew and cargo, with the pilot in a cockpit in the nose of the port fuselage and the co-pilot/mechanic in a similar cockpit in the nose of the starboard fuselage, while cargo was carried behind the crew in each fuselage. Two 300 hp (224 kW) Wright-Hisso H V8 engines were mounted in a central nacelle between the two main fuselages in a push-pull configuration, with fuel tanks mounted between the engines.

The MB-4's three-bay biplane wings were all new, with ailerons on the upper wing. It had a conventional tailwheel undercarriage and had two separate tail assemblies, which were standard MB-3 empennages. Dual controls were fitted, with the pilot able to disconnect the co-pilot's controls, but there were no means of communication between the two cockpits.

== Operational history ==
The MB-4 made its maiden flight in February 1920. While the aircraft had reasonable speed for the time, it was otherwise poor, with one fuselage tending to take-off before the other, while the engines caused severe vibration which overloaded the aircraft's structure. It was described as the "worst thing on wings" by Jerome Fried, the general plant superintendent of Thomas-Morse.

One aircraft was tested by the US Post Office, but was not used for mail services, and was scrapped in 1921. At least one MB.4 (and possibly 3) was delivered to the United States Army Air Service where it was stored before being scrapped.

The MB-4 was a failure, having extremely poor flying characteristics and being described as the "worst thing on wings", and saw no service other than the trials by the manufacturer, US Army and the US Post Office.

== Specifications ==
Data from General Dynamics Aircraft and their Predecessors

General characteristics

- Crew: 2
- Length: 25 ft 5 in (7.74 m)
- Wingspan: 45 ft 6 in (13.87 m)
- Height: 11 ft (3.4 m)
- Wing area: 645 sq ft (59.9 m^{2})
- Empty weight: 3,554 lb (1,612 kg)
- Gross weight: 5,564 lb (2,524 kg)
- Powerplant: 2 × Wright-Hisso H water-cooled V8 engines, 300 hp (220 kW) each

Performance

- Maximum speed: 122 mph (196 km/h, 106 kn)
- Stall speed: 53 mph (85 km/h, 46 kn)
- Range: 600 mi (970 km, 520 nmi)
- Time to altitude: 9,000 ft (2,745 m) in 10 min

== See also ==
Aircraft of comparable role, configuration, and era

- Caproni Ca.5
- Grahame-White Ganymede
- L-W-F Model H Owl

Related lists

- List of Trimotors
- List of Twin-boom aircraft
