= North American NA-335 =

Type of aircraft

NA-335
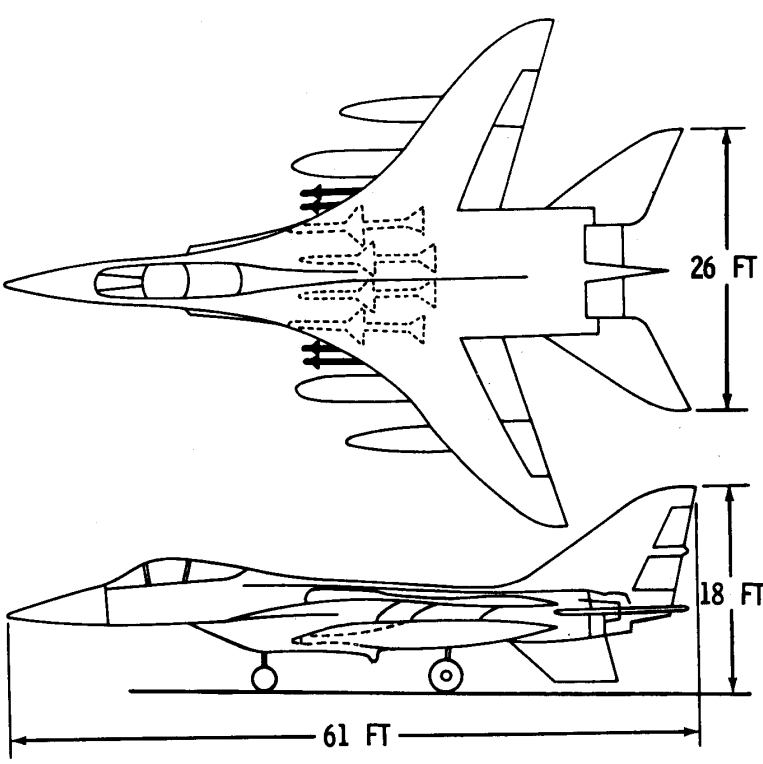

General information
- Role: Air superiority fighter
- National origin: United States
- Number built: 0

History
- Outcome: Cancelled in favor of the McDonnell Douglas F-15 Eagle

The North American NA-335 was North American Aviation's entry into the US Air Force's 1960s-1970s F-X program, which would later result in the McDonnell Douglas F-15 Eagle.

The NA-335 resembles the T-10/Su-27, however the NA-335 lacked the gap between the engine nacelles, and only a single vertical fin.

== Background ==
The "F-X" program dates back to 1964, when the General Dynamics F-111 Aardvark first flown, visualized to complement or replace the Republic F-105 Thunderchief and McDonnell Douglas F-4C Phantom II fighter-bombers. As air-to-air combat intensified in the Vietnam War, the United States Air Force required a new air superiority fighter.

== Specifications ==
Data from The F-15 Eagle: Origins and Development, 1964-1972, p.52

General characteristics

- Length: 61 ft (19 m)
- Wingspan: 46 ft (14 m)
- Height: 18 ft (5.5 m)
- Wing area: 500 sq ft (46 m^{2})
- Aspect ratio: 4.23

Performance
