= Thomas-Morse MB-7 =

MB-7
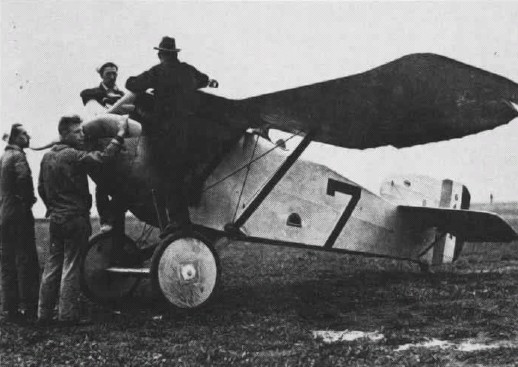
- Thomas-Morse MB-7

General information
- Type: Racing
- National origin: United States
- Manufacturer: Thomas-Morse Aircraft
- Primary user: US Navy
- Number built: 2

History
- First flight: 1921
- Developed from: Thomas-Morse MB-3

The Thomas-Morse MB-7 was an American racing plane built by Thomas-Morse Aircraft for the US Navy.

== Development and design ==
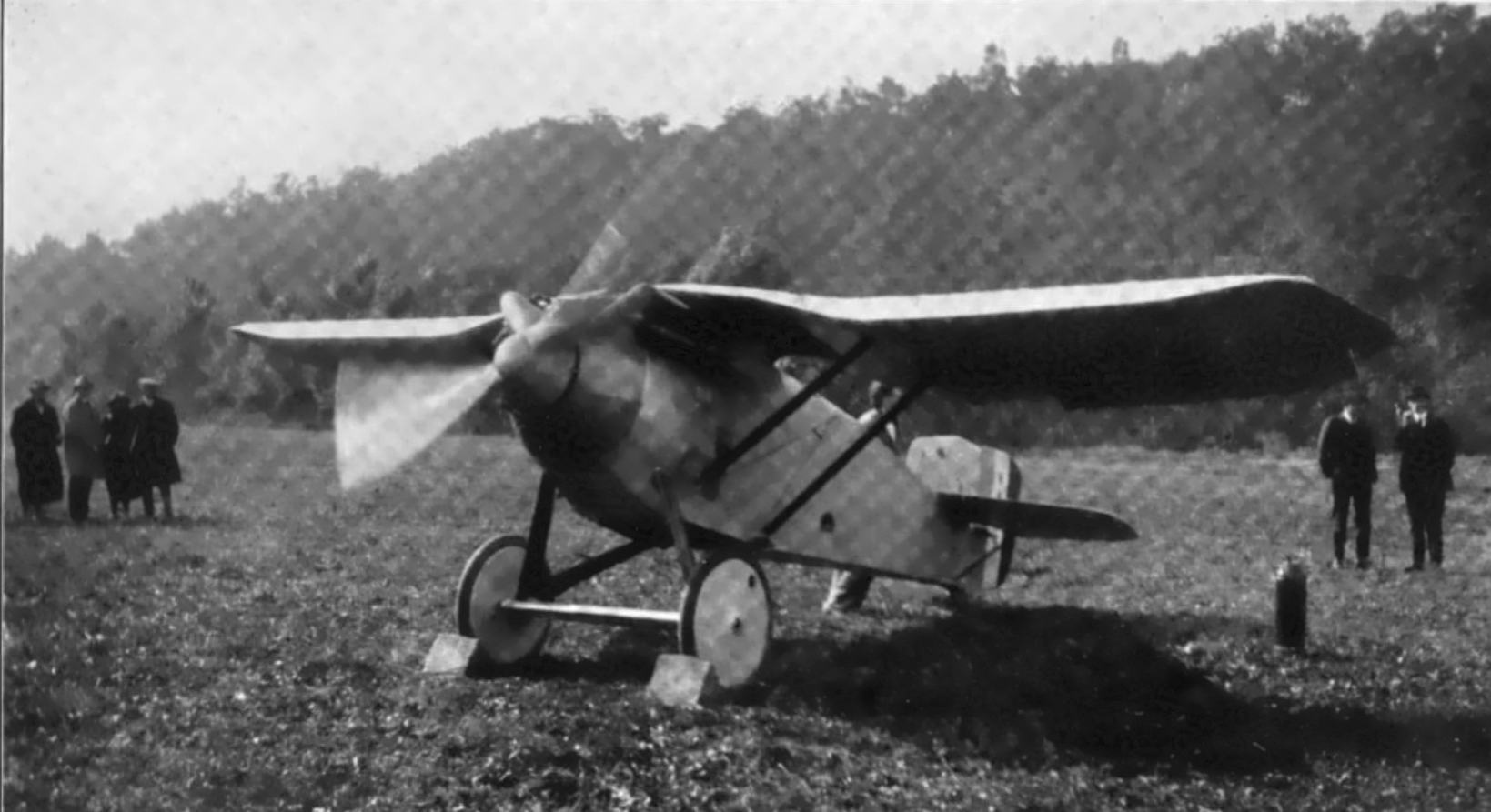

The MB-7 was built on the request of the US Navy. They had recently received the Thomas-Morse MB-3, and asked B Douglas Thomas to modify two of them to be racers. The first MB-7 was completed in 1921. It took part in the 1921 Pulitzer Trophy race, but during the race its fuel pump malfunctioned and it crashed and was destroyed by fire when a lighted match by a souvenir hunter ignited the fuel. The second MB-7 was completed in January 1922. It first flew on 14 April 1922. It competed for the US Navy in the Pulitzer Trophy on 14 October 1922. Piloted by Captain Francis Pat Mulcahy it withdrew after 30 minutes with an overheating engine. It never flew again before being dismantled on 7 January 1925.

== Operators ==
United States

- United States Navy

== Specifications ==
Data from Angelucci, 1987. p. 423.

General characteristics

- Crew: 1
- Length: 18 ft 6 in (5.63 m)
- Wingspan: 24 ft 0 in (7.31 m)
- Height: 7 ft 3 in (2.21 m)
- Wing area: 112 sq ft (10.42 m^{2})
- Empty weight: 1,423 lb (645 kg)
- Gross weight: 1,875 lb (850 kg)
- Powerplant: 1 × Wright H-2 , 400 hp (300 kW)

Performance

- Maximum speed: 181 mph (291 km/h, 157 kn)
