= Thomas-Morse O-19 =

1929 American observation biplane

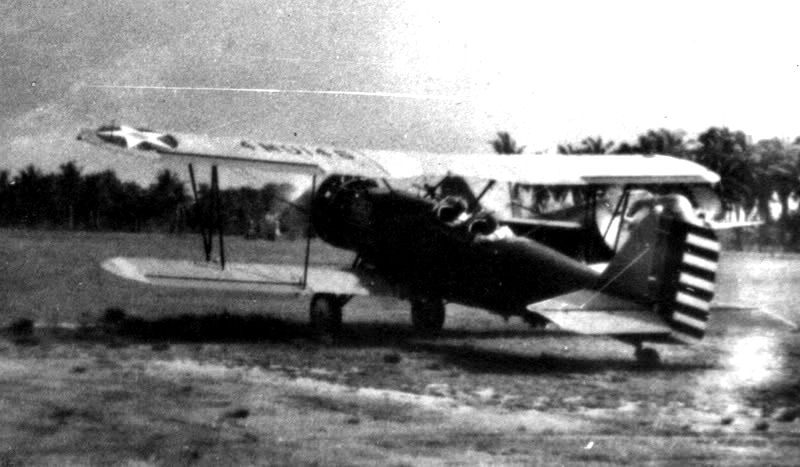
- An O-19 aircraft of the 2d Observation Squadron at Nichols Field, Luzon, Philippines, c. 1932

General information
- Type: Observation biplane
- Manufacturer: Thomas-Morse
- Primary users: United States Army Air Corps Philippine Army Air Corps
- Number built: 176

History
- Introduction date: 1929

The Thomas-Morse O-19 was an American observation biplane built by the Thomas-Morse Aircraft Company for the United States Army Air Corps.

== Development ==
The O-19 was based on the earlier Thomas-Morse O-6 biplane. It was a conventional two-seat biplane of metal construction with fabric-covered wings and tail surfaces. The design was evaluated with a number of different engine installations and the type was ordered into production as the O-19B with a Pratt & Whitney R-1340-7 Wasp radial engine.

== Variants ==
XO-19
Improved version of the XO-6 with a 450 hp (340 kW) Pratt & Whitney R-1340-3 engine, one built.
YO-20
Similar to the XO-19 with a 525 hp (391 kW) Pratt & Whitney R-1690-1 engine, one built.
XO-21
Similar to the XO-19 with a 600 hp (450 kW) Curtiss H-1640-1 engine, one built, later re-engined as the XO-21A.
XO-21A
The XO-21 fitted with a 525 hp (391 kW) Wright R-1750-1 engine.
O-19
Service evaluation aircraft with a 500 hp (370 kW) Pratt & Whitney R-1340-9, two built.
O-19A
O-19 without the 88 US Gallon main fuel tank, one built.
O-19B
Production version with a 450 hp (340 kW) Pratt & Whitney R-1340-7 engine, two machine-guns and modified cockpit, 70 built.
O-19C
O-19B with tailwheel, ring cowl and minor changes, 71 built.
O-19D
One O-19C converted as a VIP staff transport with dual controls.
O-19E
O-19C with extended upper-span wing and a 575 hp (429 kW) Pratt & Whitney R-1340-15 engine, 30 built.
O-21
O-19 with 600 hp (450 kW) Curtiss H-1640 Chieftain engine, one built, one converted.
YO-23
XO-19 with a 600 hp (450 kW) Curtiss V-1570-1 Conqueror engine, one built.
Y1O-33
One O-19B re-engined with a 600 hp (450 kW) Curtiss V-1570-11 engine and revised tail surfaces, one converted.
Y1O-41
A sesqui-plane conversion of the Y1O-33 with a 600 hp (450 kW) Curtiss V-1570-79 engine, one converted. Later modified by Consolidated Aircraft as their Model 23 and exported to Mexico.
Y1O-42
High-wing monoplane version of the Y1O-41, static test airframe only.

== Operators ==
Philippines

- Philippine Army Air Corps

United States

- United States Army Air Corps

== Specifications (O-19B) ==
Data from The Illustrated Encyclopedia of Aircraft (Part Work 1982-1985), 1985, Orbis Publishing, Page 3000

General characteristics

- Crew: two
- Length: 28 ft 4 in (8.64 m)
- Wingspan: 39 ft 9 in (12.12 m)
- Height: 10 ft 6 in (3.20 m)
- Wing area: 348 sq ft (32.33 m^{2})
- Empty weight: 2,722 lb (1,235 kg)
- Gross weight: 3,800 lb (1,724 kg)
- Powerplant: 1 × Pratt & Whitney R-1340-7 Wasp radial piston engine , 450 hp (336 kW)

Performance

- Maximum speed: 137 mph (220 km/h, 119 kn)
- Service ceiling: 20,500 ft (6,250 m)

Armament

- 2 x 0.3in (7.62mm) machine-guns (one fixed forward-firing, one movable in rear cockpit)

== See also ==
Related development

- Thomas-Morse O-6

Related lists

- List of military aircraft of the United States
