= Thomas Brothers T-2 =

T-2

General information
- National origin: United States of America
- Manufacturer: Thomas Brothers
- Designer: Benjamin D. Thomas
- Primary users: Royal Naval Air Service United States Navy
- Number built: 25 (T-2), 15 SH-4

History
- Introduction date: 1915
- First flight: 1914

The Thomas Brothers T-2 was an American-built biplane which served with the Royal Navy.

Built by Thomas-Morse Aircraft in Bath, New York, in 1914, it was the creation of Benjamin D. Thomas (later the company's chief designer), based on his Curtiss JN-4 (which it resembles), and used the 90 hp (67 kW) Austro-Daimler.

Twenty-four aircraft, in two batches, were provided to the Royal Naval Air Service, the Austro-Daimler being replaced by a similar-horsepower Curtiss OX-5

An additional fifteen, differing in being fitted with floats in place of wheels, a 100 hp (75 kW) Thomas among other engines in place of the OX-5, and three-bay wings spanning 44 ft (13.41 m), were sold to the United States Navy as the SH-4. at US$7,575 each.

== Operators ==
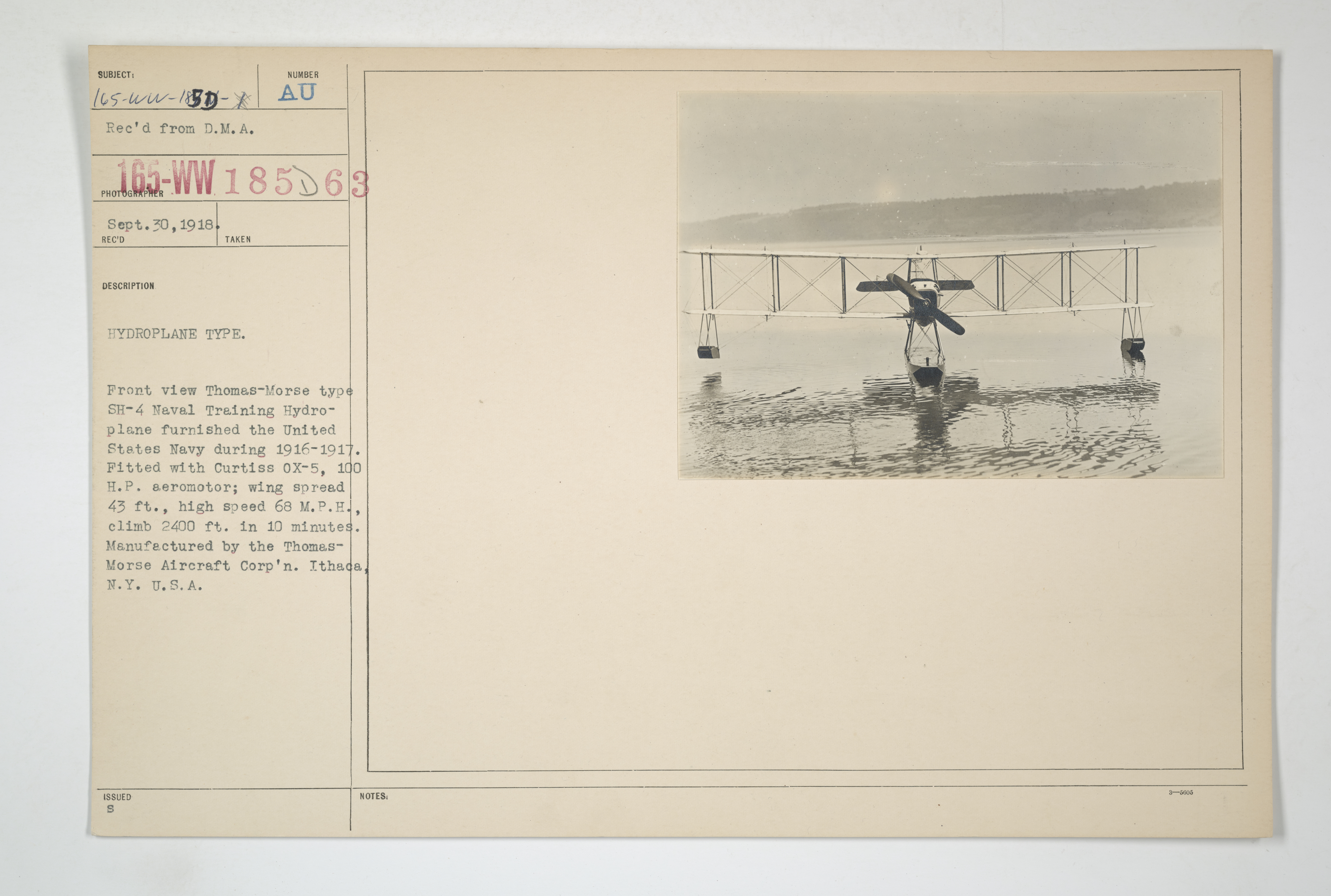
SH-4

United Kingdom

- Royal Naval Air Service: 24 examples

United States

- United States Navy: 15 examples designated SH-4

== Specifications (T-2) ==
Data from General Dynamics Aircraft and their Predecessors

General characteristics

- Crew: 2
- Length: 26 ft 0 in (7.92 m)
- Wingspan: 36 ft 0 in (10.97 m)
- Wing area: 350 sq ft (33 m^{2})
- Empty weight: 1,075 lb (488 kg)
- Gross weight: 1,972 lb (894 kg)
- Powerplant: 1 × Curtiss OX-5 water-cooled V8 engine, 90 hp (67 kW)

Performance

- Maximum speed: 83 mph (134 km/h, 72 kn)
- Time to altitude: 10 min to 3,800 ft (1,200 m)

== See also ==
Related lists

- List of military aircraft of the United States
