= Thomas-Morse S-4 =

1917 trainer aircraft by Thomas-Morse

S-4
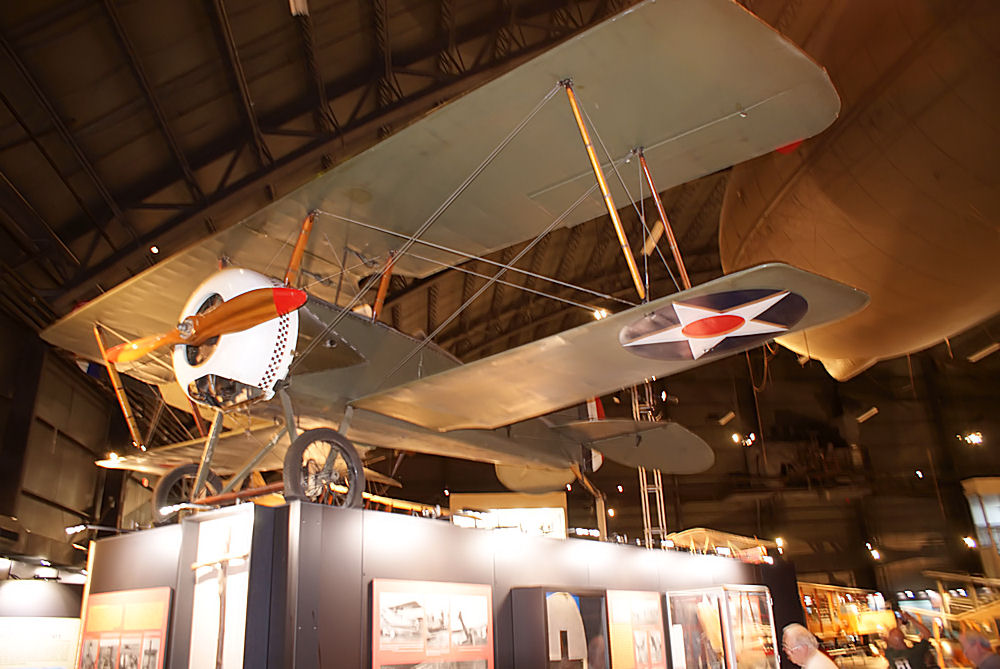
- The NMUSAF's S-4C Scout in Dayton, OH USA pre-restoration

General information
- Type: advanced trainer
- National origin: United States
- Manufacturer: Thomas-Morse Aircraft
- Designer: Benjamin D. Thomas

History
- First flight: June 1917

The Thomas-Morse S-4 Scout is an American biplane advanced trainer, operated by the United States Army and the United States Navy. Dubbed the "Tommy" by pilots who flew it, the aircraft became the favorite single-seat training airplane produced in the U.S. during World War I. It had a long and varied career beginning with the S-4B, which first appeared in the summer of 1917.

== Design and development ==
Built by Thomas-Morse Aircraft in Ithaca, New York in 1917, it was a compact single-seat open-cockpit biplane of equal span and a 100 hp (75 kW) Gnome rotary engine.

The S-4 was designed by Englishman Benjamin Douglas Thomas (no relation to the company owners), formerly with the Sopwith Aviation Company, who also assisted with the design of the Curtiss JN-4 Jenny. The S-4 made its maiden flight in June 1917 in the hands of Paul D. Wilson. Twelve planes went to the Navy.

== Operational history ==
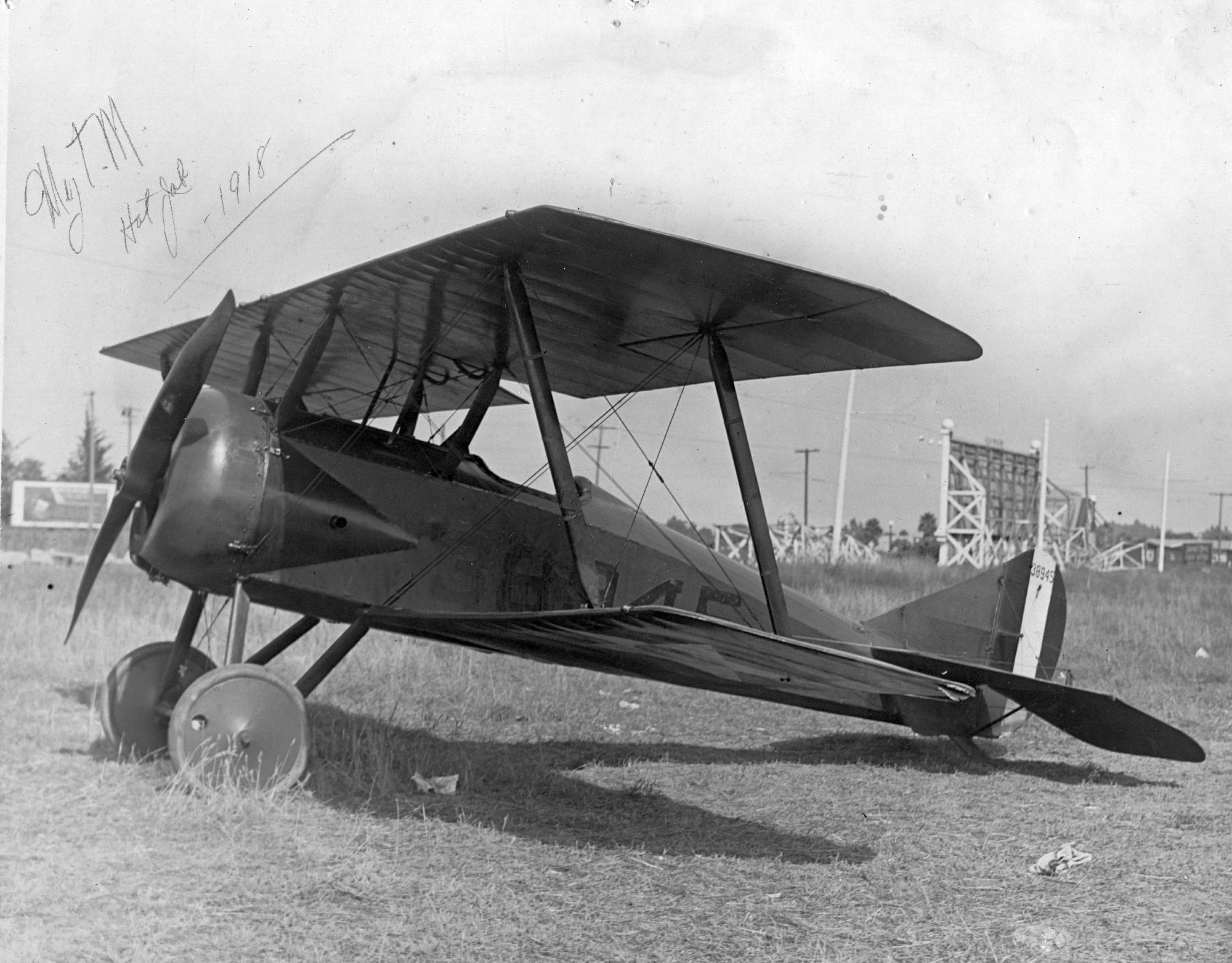
Thomas Morse S-4C with training school number on fuselage sides

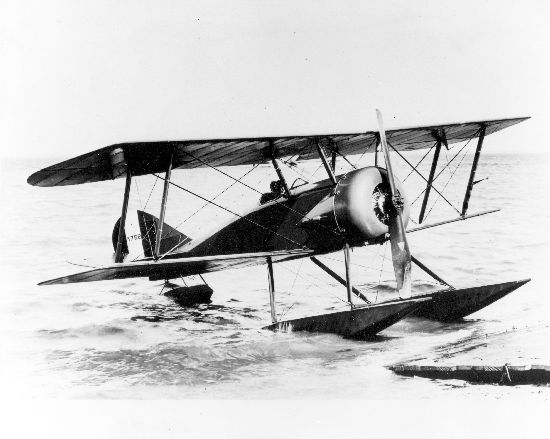
A U.S. Navy S-5

The S-4B, with a 100 hp (75 kW) Gnome, a span of 27 ft (8.23 m) (8.22 m), and length of 20 ft 3 in (6.17 m) proved more successful, with three prototypes followed by an order of 97 for the Army and 10 for the Navy, while six more were completed with two main and one tail floats as the Navy S-5. The S-4B was used by practically every pursuit flying school in the U.S. during 1918.

It was supplemented in 1918 by the S-4C, at a cost of US$5400 each. Six prototypes were built, and the 100 hp (75 kW) Gnome 9B-2 was replaced by the more reliable 80 hp (60 kW) Le Rhône 9C starting with the fifty-second production aircraft. 461 S-4Cs went to the Army and four S-4Cs with floats went to the Navy.

After World War I, many "Tommys" were sold as surplus to civilian flying schools, sportsman pilots, and ex-Army fliers. Many were still being used in the mid-1930s for World War I aviation movies, and several continue to exist in flying condition today.

A single aircraft was fitted with new tail and the more powerful 110 hp (82 kW) Le Rhone 9J rotary engine, becoming the S-4E aerobatic trainer. It was not adopted by the military, and after being fitted with a 135 hp (101 kW) Aeromarine V8 engine, it became Basil Rowe‘s racer Space-Eater.

About sixty surplus aircraft survived in civil service, most of which were fitted with the Curtiss OX-5.

== Operators ==
United States

- United States Army Air Service
- United States Navy

== Surviving aircraft ==
- 633 – S-4C in storage at Fantasy of Flight in Polk City, Florida. It was previously owned by the Crawford Auto-Aviation Museum.
- 4328 or 4367 – S-4B on static display at the Old Rhinebeck Aerodrome in Red Hook, New York. It is possibly the last S-4B produced.
- 4366 – S-4B was restored over the course of 15 years by the Ithaca Aviation Heritage Foundation in Ithaca, New York. It is made up of the fuselage of an S-4B, a top wing of a S-4C, and a reproduction bottom wing. Because this unique setup is the same as the setup used by the Tommy in the 1918 film, A Romance of the Air, it is believed to be the exact same plane as the one in the movie. Restoration was completed in 2018, and on September 29, the plane took off from the Ithaca Tompkins Regional Airport and flew multiple circuits above a large crowd gathered in honor of the Tommy's 100th birthday. It then successfully landed. The pilot was Ken Cassens of Rheinbeck. That makes it the only known example in the world that is in flying condition. Now that the plane has flown once, there are no plans for it to fly again. Instead it will be installed in a permanent exhibit at the History Center in Tompkins County, being constructed in the new Tompkins Center for History and Culture, the former Tompkins Trust building on the Ithaca Commons. The plane was previously owned by William N. Thibault, who donated it to the Ithaca Aviation Heritage Foundation.
- 38898 – S-4C airworthy at the Western Antique Aeroplane & Automobile Museum in Hood River, Oregon.
- 38899 – S-4C on static display at the EAA Aviation Museum in Oshkosh, Wisconsin.
- 38934 – S-4C on static display at the Cradle of Aviation Museum in Garden City, New York. It is equipped with its original Marlin machine gun and is on loan from Paul Kotze.
- 38944 – S-4C on static display at the National Museum of the United States Air Force in Dayton, Ohio. It was restored by students at the Aero Mechanics High School in Detroit, Michigan.
- 39734 – S-4C on display at Yanks Air Museum in Chino, California.
- S-4B on static display at the National Museum of the Marine Corps in Triangle, Virginia. It was obtained in a trade with the Aeroflex Museum in 1979 and was restored by Century Aviation. This aircraft has original S-4B wings mounted on a reproduction B-fuselage, which was fabricated using parts from the prototype S-4.
- S-4C on static display at the National Naval Aviation Museum in Pensacola, Florida. In 2000, it was reconfigured as an S-5 floatplane with the addition of twin floats. It is painted as Bureau Number A-5858.
- S-4C under restoration at the Pioneer Flight Museum in Kingsbury, Texas.
- S-4 under restoration Pioneer Flight Museum in Kingsbury, Texas.
- S-4 on static display at the Cradle of Aviation Museum in Garden City, New York. It is an uncovered Scout fuselage, possibly from one of the prototypes, fitted with a LeRhone engine and a working gun synchronizer.

== Specifications (S-4C, late production) ==
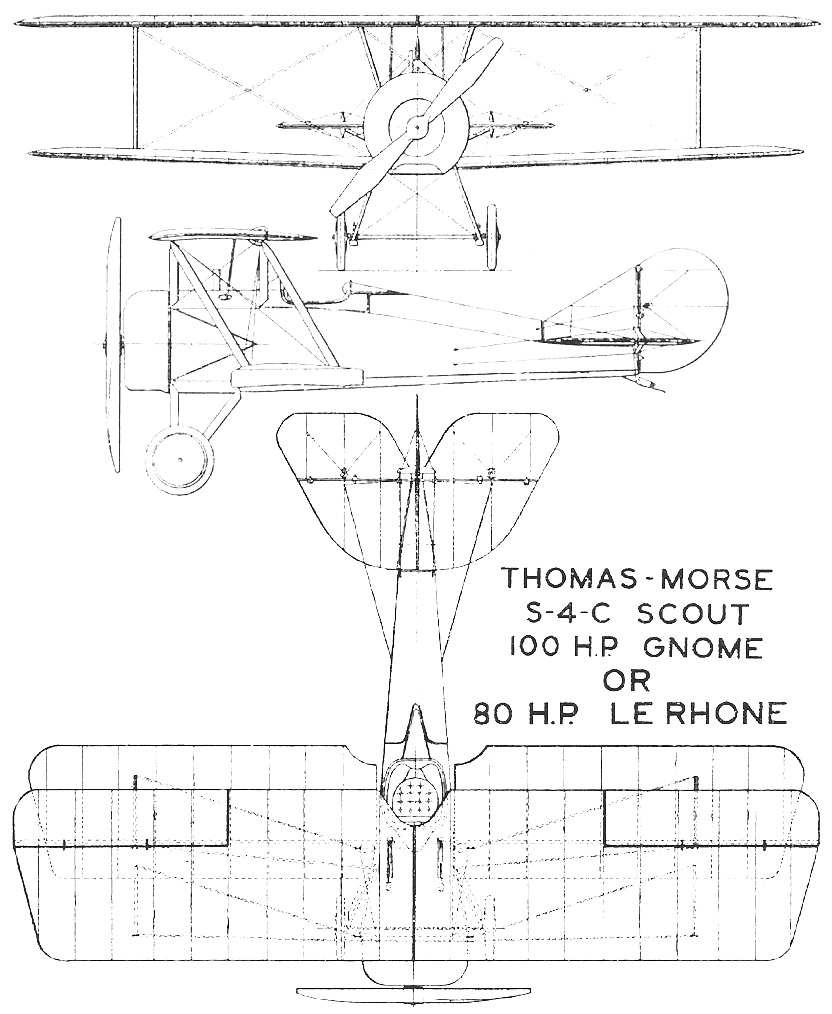
Thomas-Morse S-4C drawing

Data from Aerofiles, United States Navy Aircraft since 1911,

General characteristics

- Crew: 1
- Length: 19 ft 10 in (6.05 m)
- Wingspan: 26 ft 6 in (8.08 m)
- Height: 8 ft 1 in (2.46 m)
- Wing area: 234 sq ft (21.7 m^{2})
- Empty weight: 963 lb (437 kg)
- Gross weight: 1,330 lb (603 kg)
- Powerplant: 1 × Le Rhône 9C air-cooled rotary, 80 hp (60 kW)

Performance

- Maximum speed: 97 mph (156 km/h, 84 kn)
- Endurance: 2 hr 30 min
- Service ceiling: 15,000 ft (4,600 m)
- Wing loading: 5.7 lb/sq ft (27.7 kg/m^{2})

Armament

- Guns: Optional .30 caliber M1917/1918 Marlin-Rockwell machine gun

== See also ==
Aircraft of comparable role, configuration, and era

- Standard E-1

Related lists

- List of military aircraft of the United States
