= Thomas-Morse MB-6 =

American racing aircraft

MB-6
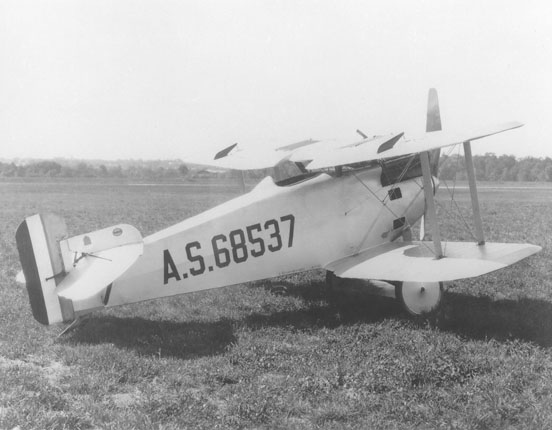

General information
- Type: Racing
- National origin: United States
- Manufacturer: Thomas-Morse Aircraft
- Primary user: US Army Air Service
- Number built: 3

History
- First flight: 21 October 1921
- Retired: 31 October 1924
- Developed from: Thomas-Morse MB-3

The Thomas-Morse MB-6 was an American racing aircraft built by Thomas-Morse Aircraft for the US Army Air Service.

== Development and design ==
After a Thomas-Morse MB-3 finished second at the 1920 Pulitzer Trophy air race, the Army asked Thomas-Morse to build a new aircraft for the 1921 race. On 21 May 1921 they ordered three aircraft for $48,000 each. The MB-6 was a redesigned MB-3, with a reduced wingspan and 400 hp (300 kW) Wright H-2 engine. The three aircraft arrived for testing at McCook Field on 20 September 1921. The first one was for ground testing, the second one first flew on 21 October 1921. The third MB-6 crashed during a landing and was destroyed.

== Operational history ==
The MB-6 competed in the 1921 Pulitzer Trophy. Piloted by Lt. J.A. Mccready, it came in third behind two Curtiss aircraft, with a speed of 160.71 mph (258.64 km/h). The aircraft was given the military designation R-2 in 1922 and scrapped on 31 October 1924.

== Operators ==
United States

- United States Army Air Service

== Specifications ==
Data from Angelucci, 1987. p. 422.

General characteristics

- Crew: 1
- Length: 18 ft 6 in (5.64 m)
- Wingspan: 19 ft 0 in (5.79 m)
- Height: 7 ft 10 in (2.38 m)
- Wing area: 185 sq ft (14.68 m^{2})
- Gross weight: 2,033 lb (922 kg)
- Powerplant: 1 × Wright H-2 , 400 hp (300 kW)

Performance

- Maximum speed: 160 mph (258 km/h, 140 kn)
