= Thulin K =

1910s Swedish fighter aircraft

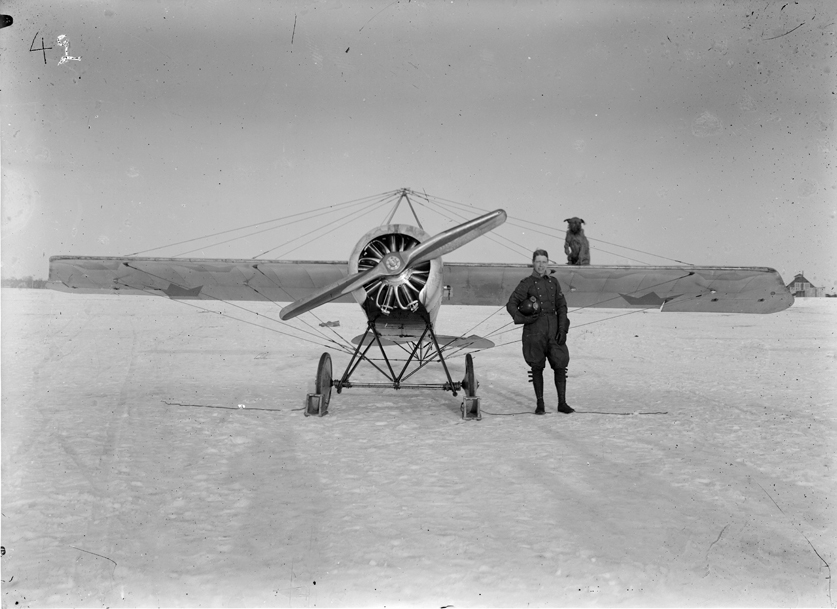

General information
- Type: Single- or two-seat fighter
- National origin: Sweden
- Manufacturer: AB Thulinverken
- Designer: Enoch Thulin
- Primary user: Royal Netherlands Navy
- Number built: 17

History
- Introduction date: 1917
- First flight: 1917
- Retired: 1920

The Thulin K was a Swedish naval fighter aircraft in the 1910s. It was operated by both the Swedish and Dutch armed forces.

== Development ==
Dr. Enoch Thulin, of AB Thulinverken, designed the Thulin K in December 1916. It was a shoulder-wing monoplane of wooden construction employing wing warping for lateral control, later ailerons. Powered by a 90 hp Thulin A Gnôme derived rotary engine, it could be configured as a single seat or tandem seat aircraft.

== Operational history ==
After initial flights in early 1917, the Swedish Army purchased two of the single seat K versions. However, it was more successful as an export plane; the Royal Netherlands Navy bought twelve K single seaters and three two seaters between 1917 and 1918. Both types were delivered without armament but the Dutch Navy fitted theirs with machine guns firing through the propeller arc and also experimented with 20 mm Madson cannons.

The aircraft's performance was good - Thulin himself broke the Swedish altitude record in it in 1919. However, on 14 May 1919 Thulin's own Thulin K lost an aileron in a steep dive, crashing and killing him. The rest of the K single seaters were written off in 1920 and the two seaters were withdrawn in 1922.

== Variants ==
Thulin K single seater
Single-seat production variant, two built for Flygcompaniet and twelve for the Dutch Navy.
Thulin K two seater
Two-seat version for the Royal Netherlands Navy, three built. Sometimes incorrectly called Thulin KA or K1.

== Operators ==
Sweden

- Swedish Air Force

Netherlands

== Specifications (Thulin K) ==
Data from Green 1994

General characteristics

- Crew: 1
- Length: 6.50 m (21 ft 4 in)
- Wingspan: 9.10 m (29 ft 10.25 in)
- Height: 2.55 m (8 ft 4 in)
- Wing area: 14.00 m^{2} (150.7 sq ft)
- Gross weight: 520 kg (1,146 lb)
- Powerplant: 1 × Thulin A rotary engine (license-made Le Rhône 9C) , 67 kW (90 hp)

Performance

- Maximum speed: 150 km/h (93 mph, 81 kn) at sea level
- Service ceiling: 5,485 m (18,000 ft)

Armament

- 1 x synchronised machine gun
- 1 x Madsen machine gun (two seater)
