= Thomas-Morse R-5 =

American racing aircraft

R-5
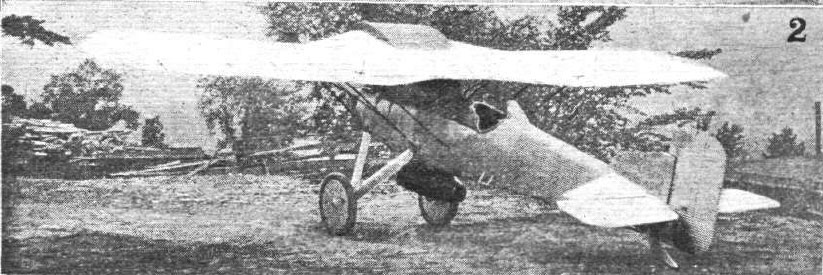

General information
- Type: Racing aircraft
- National origin: United States of America
- Manufacturer: Thomas-Morse Aircraft
- Designer: B. Douglas Thomas
- Primary user: United States Army Air Service
- Number built: 2

History
- Introduction date: 1922
- First flight: 29 September 1922
- Retired: 1923

The Thomas-Morse R-5 also known as the TM-22 was an American single-engined parasol monoplane racing aircraft of the 1920s. Two were built for the United States Army Air Service in 1922, but after competing in the 1922 Pulitzer Trophy Race the type was abandoned.

== Design and development ==
In early 1922, the United States Army Air Service placed orders with a number of American manufacturers for Racing aircraft to compete in the prestigious Pulitzer Trophy Race. Amongst the companies who received orders was Thomas-Morse Aircraft of Ithaca, New York, whose chief designer, B Douglas Thomas, designed a single-seat, single-engined parasol wing monoplane, the Thomas Morse TM-22, with two being ordered by the Army as the Thomas-Morse R-5.

The TM-22, which was based on Thomas's unsuccessful MB-9 fighter and MB-10 training aircraft, which had both flown in 1921 but had been quickly abandoned. It was of all-metal construction, with corrugated duralumin skinning over a duralumin structure, while its wing featured a distinct hump in the centre above the fuselage. The two prototypes had different wings, with the first prototype having a span of 29 ft 0 in (8.84 m) and a wing area of 174 sq ft (16.2 m²), while the second had a span of 25 ft (7.62 m) and an area of 150 sq dt (13.9 m²). It was powered by a single 600 hp (447 kW) Packard 1A-2025 V12 engine with its radiator and oil tank in a tubular container beneath the fuselage. The aircraft had a fixed conventional landing gear.

== Operational history ==
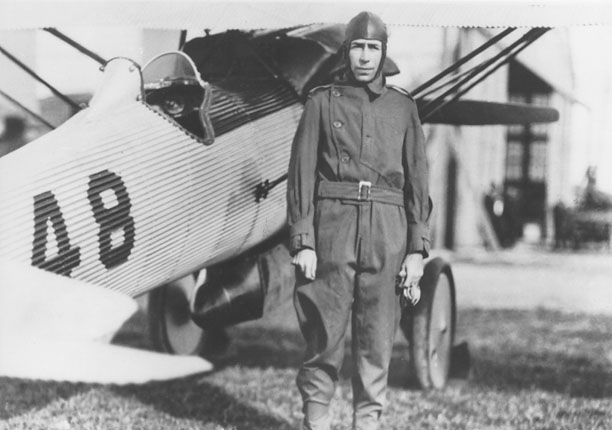
Thomas-Morse R-5 and Clayton Bissell - note the corrogated fuselage skin of the aircraft

The two aircraft were delivered to Selfridge Field, Michigan in September 1922, with the first prototype making its maiden flight there on 29 September. The aircraft suffered cooling problems and had poor handling, while struggling to reach the speed of 190 mph expected by the Air Service.

Despite these problems, the two R-5s, flown by Captain Frank O'Driscoll Hunter and Lieutenant Clayton L. Bissell were amongst the starters for the Pulitzer Race on 14 October. Bissell finished tenth at an average speed of 155.5 mph (250.4 km/h), while Hunter finish eleventh, at a speed of 149.3 mph (240.4 km/h), the last two aircraft to complete the race.

Both aircraft were sent to McCook Field, Dayton, Ohio for further testing in 1923, and were destroyed during static structural testing.

== Specifications ==
Data from The American Fighter

General characteristics

- Crew: 1
- Length: 19 ft 10 in (6.05 m)
- Wingspan: 29 ft 0 in (8.84 m)
- Height: 8 ft 6 in (2.59 m)
- Wing area: 174 sq ft (16.2 m^{2})
- Gross weight: 2,850 lb (1,293 kg)
- Powerplant: 1 × Packard 1A-2025 liquid-cooled V12 engine, 600 hp (450 kW)

Performance

- Maximum speed: 188 mph (303 km/h, 163 kn)

== See also ==
Aircraft of comparable role, configuration, and era

- Curtiss R-6

Related lists

- List of military aircraft of the United States
