= Thomas-Morse MB-1 =

MB-1
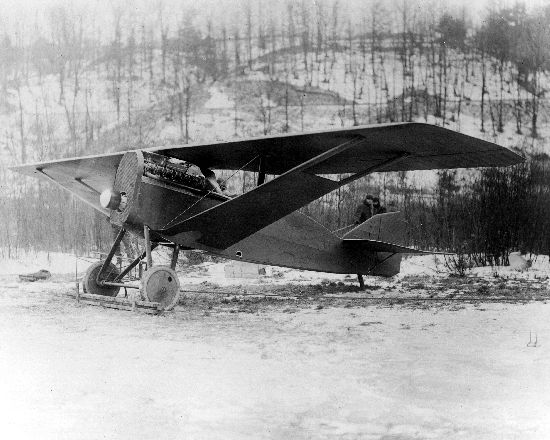

General information
- Type: Fighter
- National origin: United States
- Manufacturer: Thomas-Morse Aircraft
- Designer: B. Douglas Thomas
- Number built: 1

History
- First flight: 1918

The Thomas-Morse MB-1 was an open-cockpit monoplane fighter manufactured by Thomas-Morse Aircraft for the U.S. Army Air Service in 1918.

== Development ==
The MB-1 was designed by B. Douglas Thomas as a high wing parasol monoplane. Powered by a Liberty 12 engine, the MB-1 flew only once, and the weight of the Liberty 12 proved so heavy for the aircraft that the landing gear collapsed while the MB-1 was taxiing for another flight.

== Specifications ==
Data from

General characteristics

- Crew: 1
- Length: 22 ft 0 in (6.70 m)
- Wingspan: 37 ft 0 in (11.28 m)
- Height: 8 ft 5 in (2.56 m)
- Empty weight: 1,499 lb (680 kg)
- Powerplant: 1 × Liberty L-12 liquid-cooled piston engine , 400 hp (300 kW)

Performance Armament

- 2x 7.7 mm machine guns
