= Thomas-Morse MB-2 =

MB-2
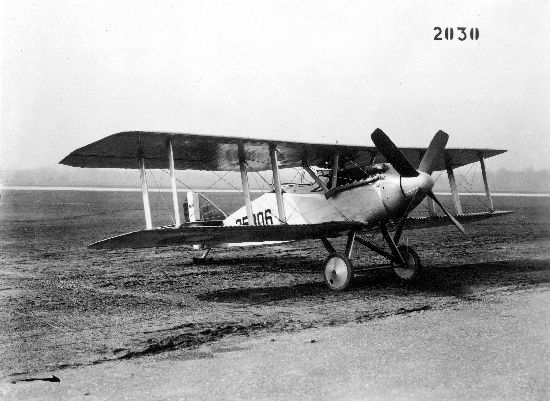

General information
- Type: Fighter
- National origin: United States
- Manufacturer: Thomas-Morse Aircraft
- Designer: B. Douglas Thomas
- Number built: 2

History
- First flight: November 1918

The Thomas-Morse MB-2 was an open-cockpit biplane fighter manufactured by Thomas-Morse Aircraft for the U.S. Army Air Service in 1918.

== Development ==
The MB-2 was designed by B. Douglas Thomas at the same time he was building the MB-1. Powered by a Liberty 12 engine, the first of two two-seat biplanes flew in November 1918. The Army was unimpressed by the performance and did not order any for production. Both prototypes were then scrapped, the second one incomplete.

== Specifications ==
Data from Angelucci, 1987. p. 420.

General characteristics

- Crew: 2
- Length: 24 ft 0 in (7.31 m)
- Wingspan: 31 ft 0 in (9.44 m)
- Height: 8 ft 0 in (2.43 m)
- Wing area: 323 sq ft (30 m^{2})
- Empty weight: 2,047 lb (929 kg)
- Gross weight: 2,773 lb (1,258 kg)
- Powerplant: 1 × Liberty L-12 liquid-cooled piston engine , 400 hp (300 kW)

Performance
