= Thomas-Morse Aircraft =

Thomas-Morse Aircraft Corporation
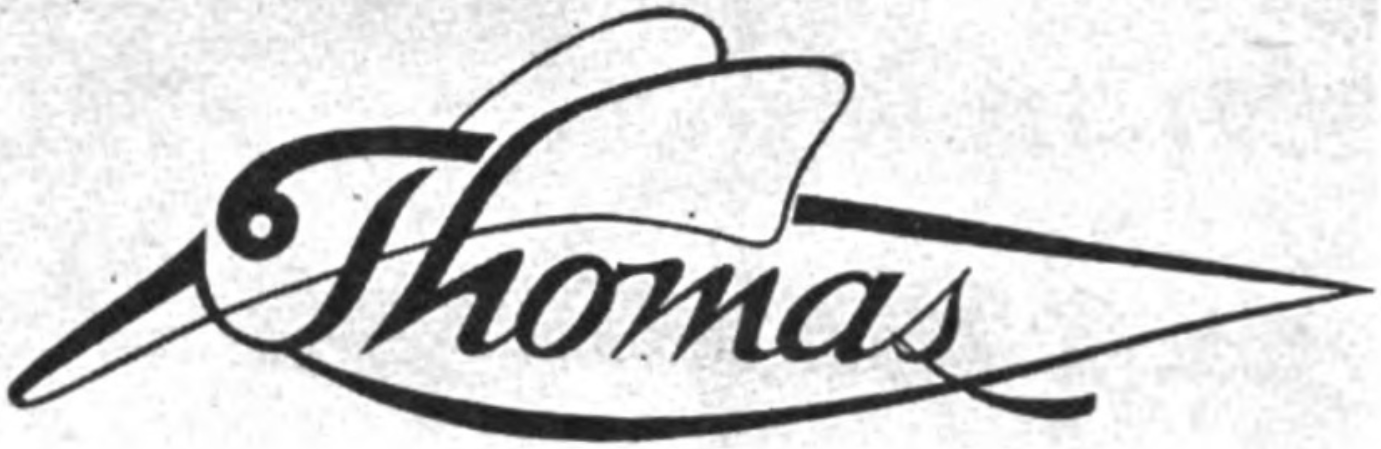

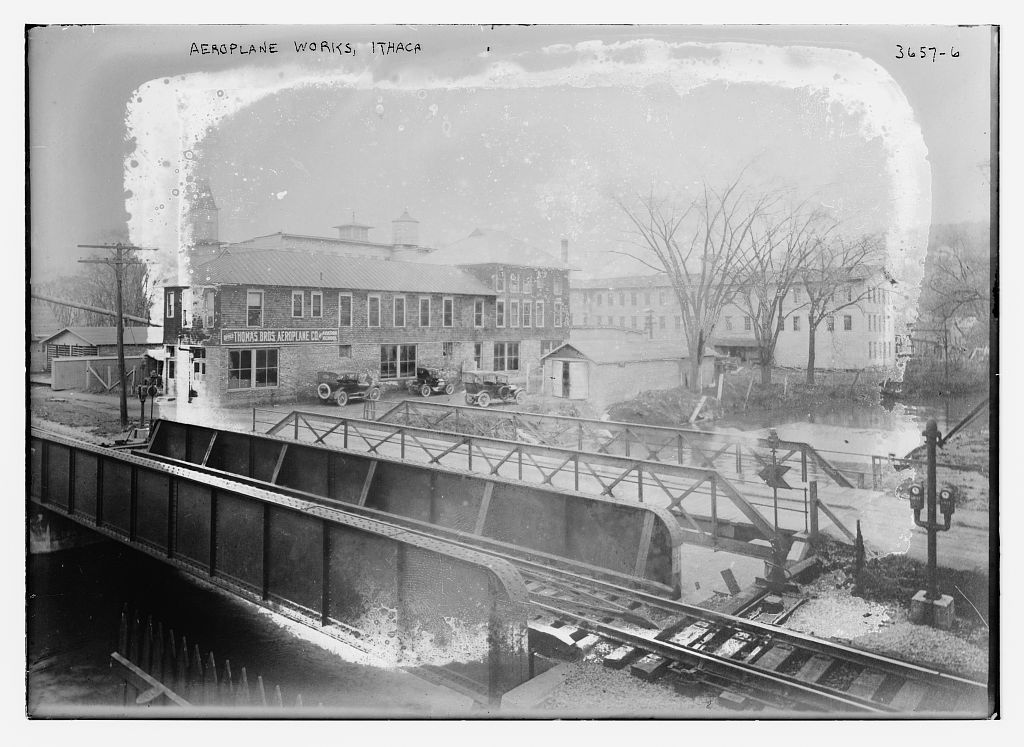
- Thomas Brothers Aeroplane Company in Ithaca, New York in 1915
- Industry: Aerospace
- Founded: 1910
- Founders: Oliver W. Thomas; William T. Thomas
- Defunct: 1934
- Fate: Bought by Consolidated Aircraft
- Successor: Consolidated Aircraft
- Key people: Frank L. Morse

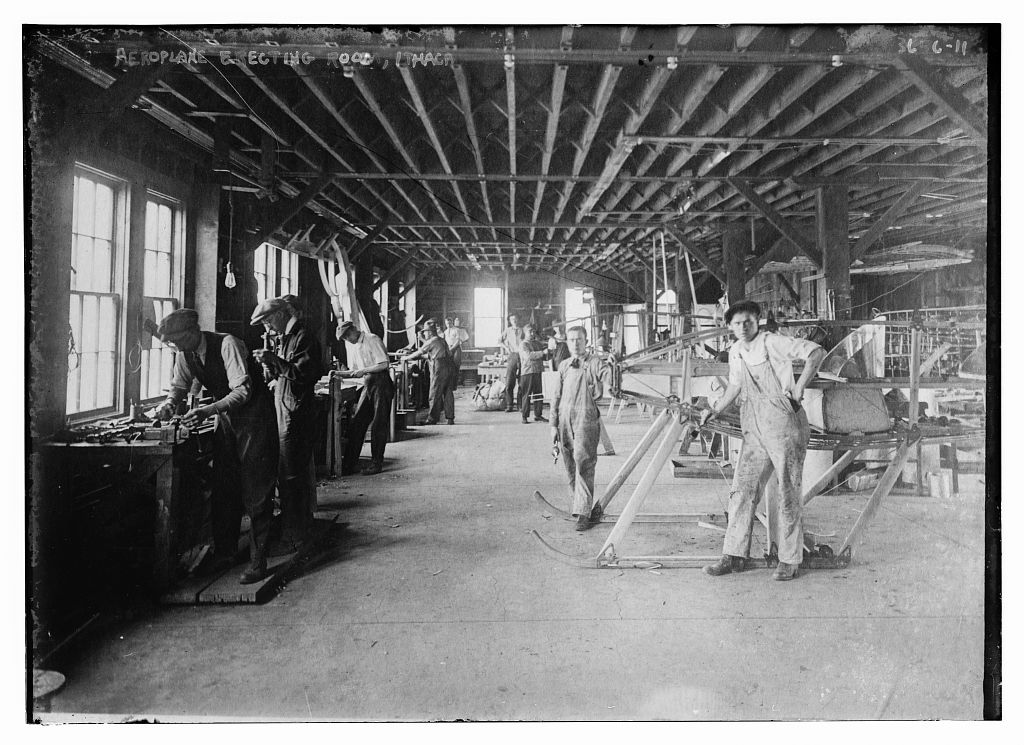
Thomas Brothers Aeroplane Company factory floor in Ithaca, New York in 1915

The Thomas-Morse Aircraft Corporation was an American aircraft manufacturer, until it was taken over by the Consolidated Aircraft Corporation in 1929.

== History ==
Founded in 1910 by English immigrants William T. Thomas and his brother Oliver W. Thomas as Thomas Brothers Company in Hammondsport, New York, the company moved to Hornell, New York, and moved again to Bath, New York, the same year. At the Livingston County Picnic in 1912 The Thomas Brothers Hydro-aeroplane was scheduled to fly the first Hydro-aeroplane in Livingston County but later reported the winds prevented the flight. During 1913, the company operated the affiliated Thomas Brothers School of Aviation at Conesus Lake, McPherson Point in Livingston County, New York state (taking a page from Glenn Curtiss, who did much the same at Keuka Lake). In 1913, the name became Thomas Brothers Aeroplane Company and based in Ithaca, New York. On December 7, 1914, the company moved to Ithaca.

In 1915, Thomas Brothers built T-2 tractor biplanes (designed by Benjamin D. Thomas, no relation to the brothers and also an Englishman, formerly of Vickers, Sopwith, and Curtiss, and later the company's chief designer) for the Royal Naval Air Service and (fitted with floats in place of wheels) for the United States Navy as the SH-4. They received an order for 24 T-2's from the British, for use in the European war. Because the Curtiss OX engines weren't available, they founded an engine subsidiary, the Thomas Aeromotor Company, which would stress their finances. In 1916, the company won a contract from the United States Army Signal Corps for two aircraft for evaluation, the D-5.

In January 1917, financial difficulties led to the company merge with Morse Chain Company (headed by Frank L. Morse), who was backed financially by H T Westinghouse, becoming Thomas-Morse Aircraft Corporation, still based in Ithaca. The company then made an attempt at selling training biplanes to the United States Army and was successful with the S-4 trainer (which included a handful of S-5 floatplanes and a single S-4E) and MB series of fighters. The last company design was the O-19 observation biplane. In 1929 the company was taken over by the Consolidated Aircraft Corporation, becoming the Thomas-Morse Division, and ceased business in 1934.

== Aircraft ==
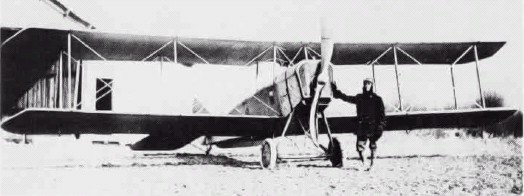
D-2

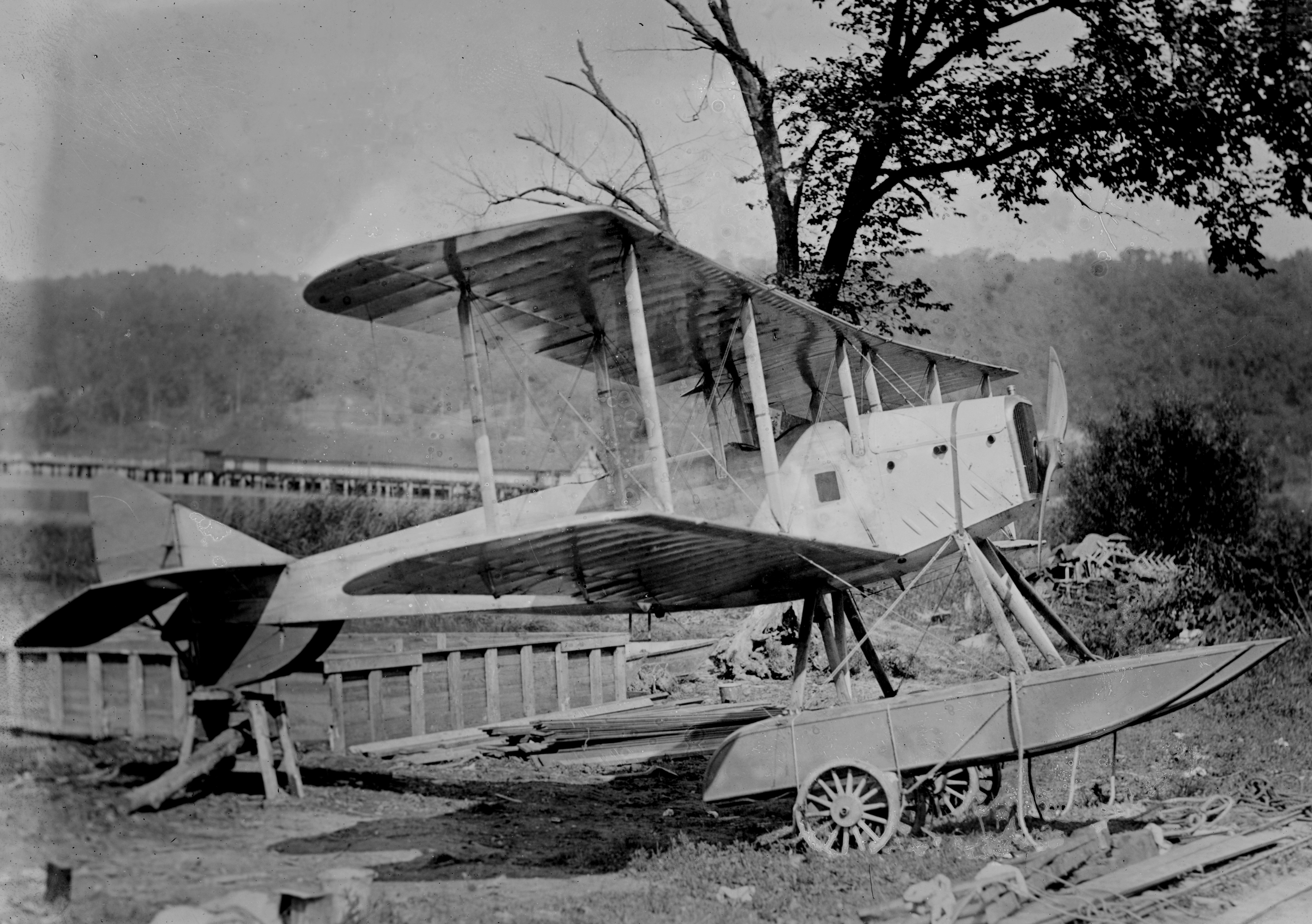
HS

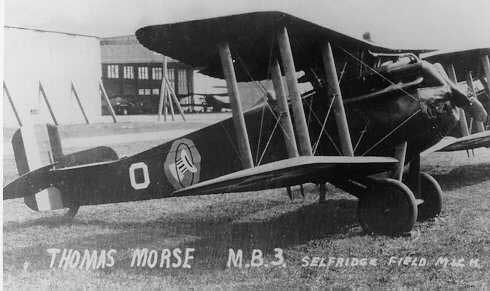
MB-3

Model name	First flight	Number built	Type
Thomas Brothers D-2			
Thomas Brothers D-5			
Thomas Brothers HS			
Thomas Brothers T-2	1914	25	Single engine biplane
Thomas Brothers S-4	1917	577	Single engine biplane advanced trainer
Thomas Brothers SH-4		15	Floatplane version of T-2
Thomas-Morse MB-1	1918	1	Single engine monoplane fighter
Thomas-Morse MB-2	1918	2	Single engine biplane fighter
Thomas-Morse MB-3	1919	265	Single engine biplane fighter
Thomas-Morse MB-4	1920	2+	Twin engine biplane mail plane
Thomas-Morse MB-6	1921	3	Single engine biplane racer
Thomas-Morse MB-7	1921	2	Single engine monoplane racer
Thomas-Morse MB-9	1922	1	Single engine monoplane fighter
Thomas-Morse MB-10	1921	1	Single engine monoplane trainer
Thomas-Morse R-5	1922	2	Single engine monoplane racer
Thomas-Morse TM-24	1925	1	Single engine biplane observation airplane
Thomas-Morse O-6		5-6	All metal version of Douglas O-2
Thomas-Morse O-19		176	Single engine biplane observation airplane
Thomas-Morse XP-13 Viper		1	Single engine biplane fighter
