= Thomas-Morse MB-9 =

1920s experimental fighter aircraft

MB-9

General information
- Type: Fighter aircraft
- National origin: United States of America
- Manufacturer: Thomas-Morse Aircraft
- Designer: B Douglas Thomas
- Number built: 1 (MB-9)

History
- First flight: 1922

The Thomas Morse MB-9 was an experimental American fighter aircraft of the 1920s. It was a single-engined, single-seat parasol winged monoplane, but was unsuccessful, being quickly abandoned.

== Design and development ==
In 1921, B. Douglas Thomas, chief designer of Thomas-Morse Aircraft designed two closely related parasol monoplanes, a single-seat fighter, the MB-9 and a two-seat trainer, the MB-10. They were of all-metal construction, with corrugated duralumin skinning.

First to be completed was the MB-10, which had tandem cockpits and was designed to be powered by a 200 hp (150 kW) Wright or Lawrance radial engine. In the absence of the intended engine, it was fitted with a 110 hp (82 kW) Le Rhône 9Ja rotary engine to allow flight testing to start in late 1921. The MB-10's handling proved to be extremely poor, while it also suffered severe vibration and was structurally weak.

The MB-9 fighter was completed early in 1922, differing principally from the MB-10 in the removal of the forward cockpit and the use of a 320 hp (240 kW) Wright Hispano H-3 V8 engine, cooled by a radiator situated (along with the oil tank) in a torpedo-shaped structure under the fuselage. Planned armament was two machine guns; one .50 in (12.7 mm) and one .30 in (7.62 mm).

While the MB.9 handled better than the MB.10, it still suffered from the severe vibration and structural problems that plagued the trainer, together with a weak undercarriage and cooling problems. The development of both aircraft was quickly stopped, with the types not being sent for formal evaluation by the United States Army Air Service at McCook Field.

== Variants ==
MB-9
Single-seat fighter powered by 300 hp (239 kW) Wright Hispano H-3 engine. One built.
MB-10
Two seat primary trainer aircraft, powered by 110 hp (82 kW) Le Rhône rotary engine. One built.

== Specifications (MB-9) ==
Data from The Complete Book of Fighters

General characteristics

- Crew: 1
- Length: 19 ft 0 in (5.79 m)
- Wingspan: 29 ft 0 in (8.84 m)
- Powerplant: 1 × Wright Hispano H-3 water-cooled V8 engine, 320 hp (240 kW)

Performance

- Maximum speed: 170 mph (270 km/h, 150 kn)

Armament

- Guns: 1 × .30 in (7.62 mm) and 1 × .50 in (12.7 mm) machine gun (planned)

== See also ==
Related development Thomas-Morse TM-22
