= Thomas-Morse MB-3 =

Fighter aircraft family

MB-3
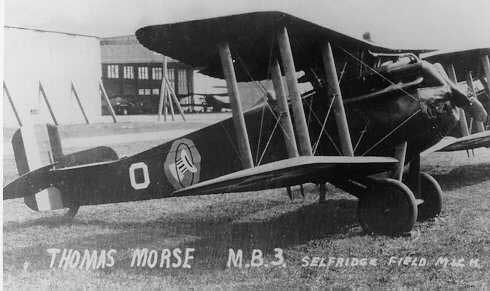
- MB-3 of 94th Pursuit Squadron, 1st Pursuit Group, Selfridge Field, Michigan

General information
- Type: Fighter
- Manufacturer: Thomas-Morse Aircraft & Boeing
- Designer: B. Douglas Thomas
- Primary users: United States Army Air Service United States Marine Corps
- Number built: 265

History
- Introduction date: March 1919
- First flight: 21 February 1919
- Retired: 1925
- Variants: Thomas-Morse MB-6; Thomas-Morse MB-7

The Thomas-Morse MB-3 was an open-cockpit biplane fighter primarily manufactured by the Boeing Company for the U.S. Army Air Service in 1922. The MB-3A was the mainstay fighter for the Air Service between 1922 and 1925.

== Development ==
In March 1918, the United States Army Air Service requested several American aircraft manufacturers to design a new fighter, to be powered by a water-cooled 300 hp (220 kW) Wright-Hispano H, a license-built Hispano-Suiza 8, to replace the French-built SPAD XIII. The Thomas-Morse Aircraft Corporation of Ithaca, New York proposed the MB-3, designed by its British-born chief designer B. Douglas Thomas, to meet this requirement, with an order for four prototypes being placed in September 1918.

The MB-3 was a single seat two-bay biplane of similar layout to the SPAD XIII that it was intended to replace. It was of wood and fabric construction with a fixed conventional landing gear. Powerplant was the expected Wright-Hispano water-cooled V-8 engine driving a two-bladed propeller and cooled by a radiator mounted on the center-section of the upper wing. The pilot sat in an open cockpit under a cut-out in the upper wing, with two 0.30 in Marlin machine-guns mounted ahead of the pilot.

The first MB-3 made its maiden flight on 21 February 1919. Testing showed that the fighter had good performance and handled well, but the cockpit was cramped and gave a poor view for the pilot. The prototypes were plagued with fuel leaks and suffered serious engine vibration, while maintenance was difficult, often requiring holes to be cut in the fuselage structure to allow access. Despite these problems, the Air Service was sufficiently impressed with the MB-3 to place an order for 50 aircraft with Thomas-Morse in June 1920.

The Air Service had a requirement for more fighters, and issued a request for tenders for a further 200 of a modified version of the MB-3, (Note: Under the military procurement system of the time, the Army purchased the production rights to an aircraft when it purchased a prototype, with no guarantee that orders would go to the designers of the aircraft. When Thomas-Morse was awarded the order for the first 50 MB-3s, a contract for 50 of the competing design, the Orenco D was awarded to Curtiss rather than its creator, Orenco. The loss of the production order for the Orenco D soon caused the failure of Orenco.) the MB-3A, which incorporated a number of changes developed by the Air Service as a result of testing at McCook Field, including a stronger structure and replacing the wing-mounted radiator with ones on each side of the fuselage in-line with the cockpit. Thomas-Morse was confident in winning orders for the MB-3A, investing in the necessary jigs for such a large production order, but was heavily underbid by Boeing, whose mass production methods allowed it to profit while still charging a lower price (in the case of the MB-3A, $7,240 per copy), saving almost half a million dollars over the 200 aircraft contract, awarded on 21 April 1921. Boeing credits this contract with rescuing the company from financial difficulties following the cancellation of orders after World War I, and with being the impetus for its rise as a premier manufacturer of military aircraft.

Thomas-Morse did manage to win a contract for 12 MB-3s for the US Marine Corps in May 1921, with the order later being changed to substitute two MB-7 racing aircraft, a MB-3 with the biplane wings replaced by parasol wings, for two MB-3s, with a further MB-3 purchased when one of the MB-7s crashed. Additionally, the Army ordered three MB-6, another racing version of the MB-3 with shorter span wings and a more powerful engine in May 1921.

== Operational history ==
Two of the prototypes were entered in the 1920 Pulitzer Trophy race, with one finishing in second place behind the Verville VCP-R, completing the 116 miles (187 km) course in an average speed of 148 miles per hour (238 km/h). Completed MB-3s started to roll out of Thomas-Morse's factory in April 1921, but deliveries were delayed by an accident during testing when an MB-3 lost a section of the upper wing during diving tests, this causing the type to be grounded while the accident was investigated.

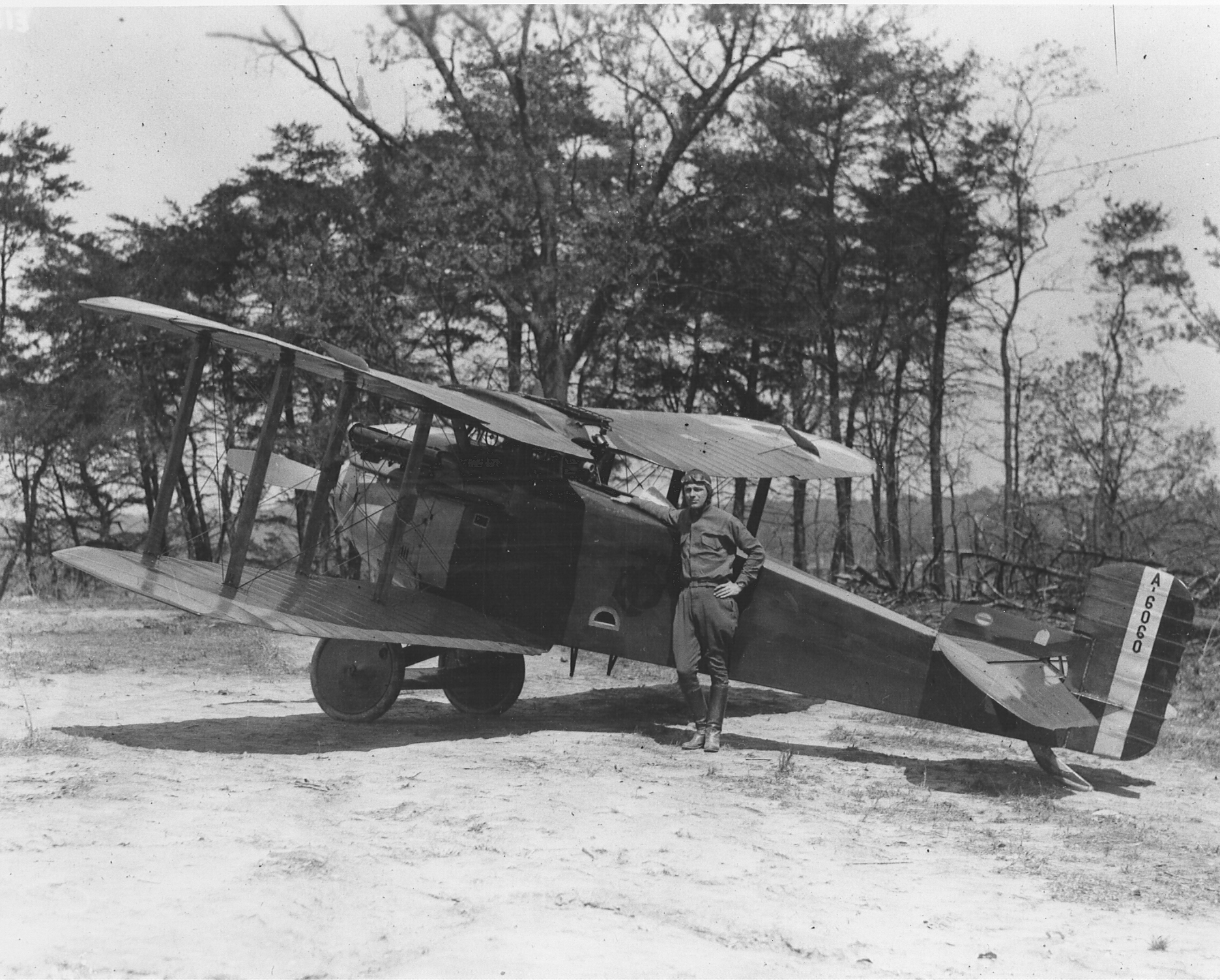
US Marine Corps MB-3

The 1st Pursuit Group began to receive MB-3s in January 1922, supplementing its elderly SPADs and S.E.5as. (Note: The Orenco D had entered service with the 1st Pursuit in March 1921, but had been withdrawn from service following an accident in September, which had revealed poor build quality throughout the fleet) In service, the new type was troublesome, being unreliable (over a ten-day test period in May 1922, the number of serviceable MB-3s dropped from 20 out of 36 to just 3) and continuing to suffer the vibration problems encountered by the prototypes, eventually traced to the rigid engine mount.

The first delivery of the improved MB-3As took place on 29 July 1922, with the last aircraft delivered on 27 December that year. The last 50 MB-3As were fitted with larger tail surfaces. As well as allowing re-equipment of the four squadrons of the 1st Pursuit Group, the MB-3As were issued to a number of overseas squadrons, equipping two squadrons on Hawaii, one in the Philippines and one in the Panama Canal Zone.

From 1926, the MB-3A started to be replaced by the Curtiss PW-8 and Boeing PW-9 fighters. A number of aircraft were refurbished and used as MB-3M advanced trainers at Kelly Field, remaining in use until 1929.

The Marine Corps took delivery of its MB-3s in February–March 1922, but the type was unpopular with the Marines, being withdrawn from use in July that year and sold back to the Army for use as MB-3M trainers.

== Variants ==
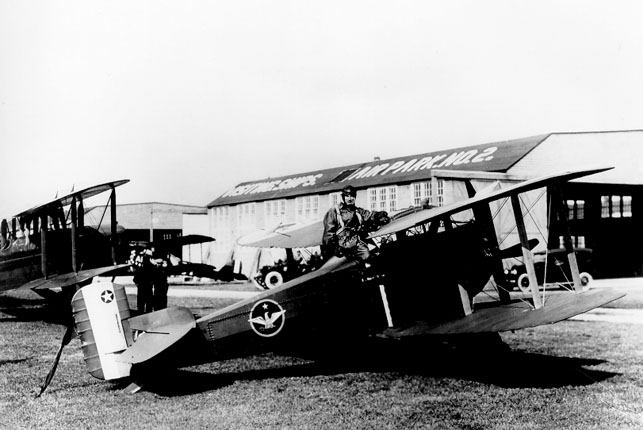
Thomas-Morse MB-3 assigned to Billy Mitchell, at Selfridge Field, Michigan

MB-3
Thomas-Morse built aircraft. 65 built. (Four prototypes, 50 production for Army Air Service and 11 for US Marine Corps.)
MB-3A
200 built by Boeing with a revised cooling system.
MB-3M
MB-3As relegated to advanced training duties.

== Operators ==
United States

- United States Army Air Service
- United States Marine Corps

== Specifications (MB-3A) ==
Data from United States Military Aircraft Since 1909

General characteristics

- Crew: One
- Length: 20 ft 0 in (6.10 m)
- Wingspan: 26 ft 0 in (7.92 m)
- Height: 8 ft 7 in (2.59 m)
- Wing area: 229 sq ft (21.28 m^{2})
- Empty weight: 1,716 lb (778 kg)
- Gross weight: 2,539 lb (1,151 kg)
- Powerplant: 1 × Wright H V-8 piston engine, 300 hp (217 kW)

Performance

- Maximum speed: 141 mph (228 km/h, 123 kn) at sea level
- Cruise speed: 125 mph (201 km/h, 109 kn)
- Endurance: 2.25 hr
- Service ceiling: 19,500 ft (5,945 m)
- Rate of climb: 1,235 ft/min (6.3 m/s)

Armament

- Guns:
  - 2 × fixed forward firing 0.30 inch (7.62 mm) machine guns or
  - 1 × 0.30 inch and 1 × 0.50 inch (12.7 mm) machine guns or
  - 2 × fixed forward firing 0.50 inch machine guns
