= F2B =

F2B may refer to:

- FAI CLASS F2B - Control Line Aerobatic Model Aircraft.
- Boeing F2B, an aircraft
- Fade to Black (video game)
- First two blocks, in speedcubing
- Bristol F.2 Fighter, a Great War British aircraft
- Mitsubishi F-2, a Japanese fighter aircraft
