= Boeing XP-8 =

Fighter aircraft prototype by Boeing

XP-8
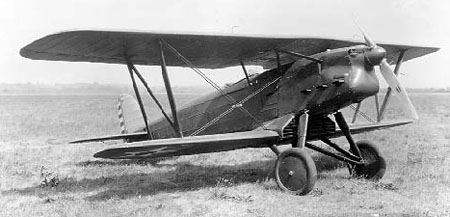
- Boeing XP-8 (U.S. Air Force photo)

General information
- Type: Fighter
- Manufacturer: Boeing
- Primary user: United States Army Air Corps
- Number built: 1

History
- Introduction date: Cancelled
- First flight: January 1928
- Developed from: PW-9
- Variant: Boeing F2B

The Boeing XP-8 (Boeing Model 66) was a prototype American biplane fighter of the 1920s, notable for its unusual design incorporating the engine radiator into the lower wing.

== Design and development ==
Boeing developed the prototype in 1926 as a private venture, with the goal of winning the Army Air Corps competition announced in 1925. Designated by Boeing as its Model 66, the airframe was basically a PW-9 with an experimental 600 hp Packard 2A-1500 engine. In order to streamline around the engine, the radiator was moved back so that the opening coincided with the front edge of the lower wing, resulting in an unusually narrow profile around the engine.

== Testing ==
Army testing of the aircraft began in January 1928, and it handled well, but performance was lacking, achieving only a maximum speed of 173.2 mph. Even so, the prototype continued in Air Corps service until June 1929, after which it was scrapped. The airframe design lived on in the Navy's Boeing F2B.

== Operators ==
United States

- United States Army Air Corps

== Specifications (XP-8) ==
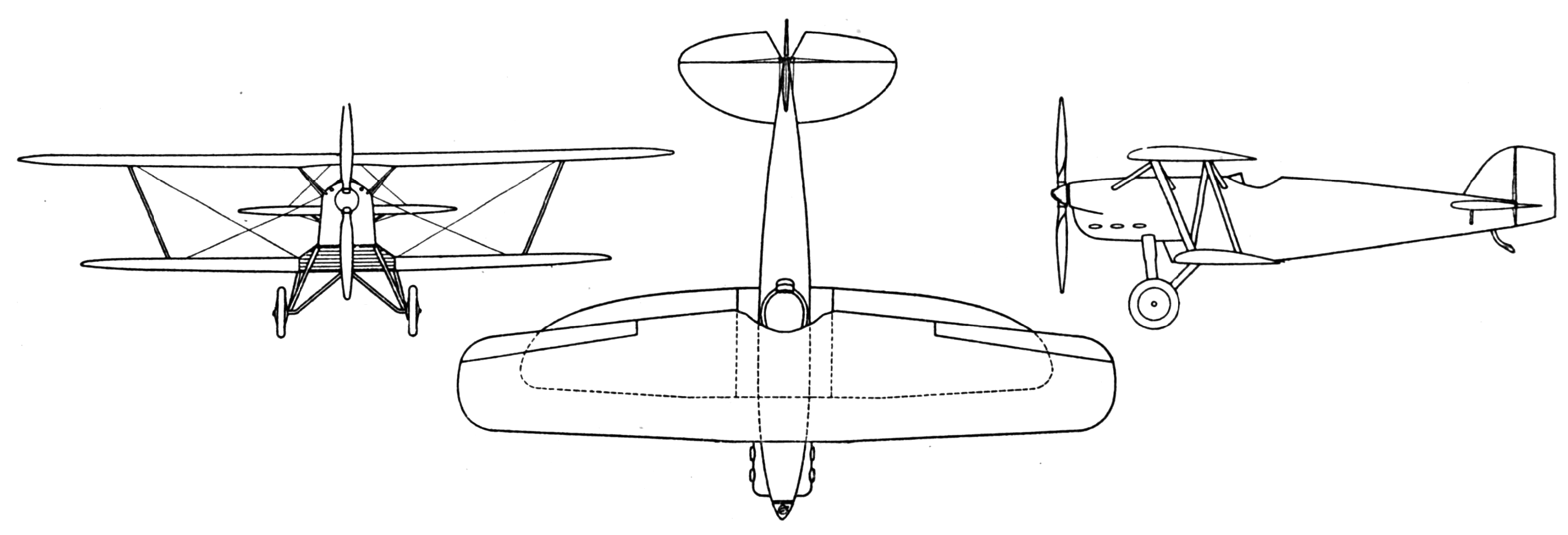
Boeing XP-8 3-view drawing from L'Aéronautique October,1927

Data from Fighters of the United States Air Force

General characteristics

- Crew: One
- Length: 23 ft 5 in (7.14 m)
- Wingspan: 30 ft 1 in (9.17 m)
- Height: 9 ft 0 in (2.74 m)
- Wing area: 260 sq ft (24.15 m^{2})
- Empty weight: 2,390 lb (1,084 kg)
- Max takeoff weight: 3,421 lb (1,552 kg)
- Powerplant: 1 × Packard 2A-1500 liquid-cooled piston engine, 600 hp (448 kW)

Performance

- Maximum speed: 153 kn (176 mph, 283 km/h) at 6,000 ft (1,830 m)
- Cruise speed: 129 kn (148 mph, 238 km/h)
- Range: 283 nmi (325 mi, 523 km)
- Service ceiling: 20,950 ft (6,386 m)
- Rate of climb: 1,750 ft/min (8.89 m/s)

Armament

- Guns: one 0.3 in and one 0.5 in machine guns

== See also ==
Related lists

- List of military aircraft of the United States
- List of fighter aircraft
