= VFA-14 =

United States Navy aviation squadron

Strike Fighter Squadron 14
- Active: 1919
- Country: United States
- Branch: United States Navy
- Type: Fighter/Attack
- Role: Close air support Air interdiction Aerial reconnaissance
- Part of: Carrier Air Wing Nine
- Garrison/HQ: NAS Lemoore
- Nickname: Tophatters
- Mottos: "The Oldest and Boldest"
- Engagements: World War II; Vietnam War; Multinational Force in Lebanon; United States invasion of Grenada; Gulf War; Operation Provide Comfort; Operation Southern Watch; Operation Allied Force; Operation Enduring Freedom; Iraq War; Operation Inherent Resolve; 2024 Iran–Israel conflict Operation Prosperity Guardian; Operation Poseidon Archer; Operation Epic Fury
- Decorations: 2022 Battle "E"; 2020 Battle "E"; 2012 RADM C. Wade McLuskey Award; 2010 Battle "E"; 1980 Battle "E"

Commanders
- Commanding Officer: CDR Brett Jakovich
- Executive Officer: CDR Joseph Camp Jr.
- Command Master Chief: CMDCM William L. Simms

Aircraft flown
- Fighter: F4B; SB2U Vindicator; SBD Dauntless; F4U Corsair; F3D Skyknight; F3H Demon; F-4 Phantom; F-14 Tomcat; F/A-18E Super Hornet

Strike Fighter Squadron 14 (VFA-14) "Tophatters" is a United States Navy fighter attack squadron based at Naval Air Station Lemoore. They fly the F/A-18E Super Hornet, and are the Navy's oldest active squadron, having formed in 1919. Their callsign is Camelot, and their tail code is NG.

== History ==
Since its inception, the squadron has flown 23 different type aircraft, had its designation changed 14 times, operated from 20 different aircraft carriers and several battleships, and had 92 commanding officers (the 93rd is now in command).

Over the years, the squadron has been assigned many different missions, including patrol and observation in its early years, and scouting, attack, fighter, bombing, and forward air control missions when it became associated with carrier-based operations. The squadron adopted the classic Top Hat as its squadron patch and called themselves the "High Hats."

The squadron's callsign "Camelot" came about because an old skipper liked King Arthur so his wife suggested that the squadron take the callsign of the King's legendary castle, Camelot.

VFA-14 squadron lineage
Date	designation	Squadron type
Nov 1919	Pacific Fleet; Air Detachment	
15 Jun 1920	VT-5	Torpedo and bombing squadron
7 Sep 1921	VP-4-1	Patrol squadron
23 Sep 1921	VF-4	Fighting squadron
1 Jul 1922	VF-1	Fighting squadron
1 Jul 1927	VF-1B	Fighting squadron
1 Jul 1934	VB-2B	Bombing squadron
1 Jul 1937	VB-3	Bombing squadron
1 Jul 1939	VB-4	Bombing squadron
15 Mar 1941	VS-41	Scouting squadron
1 Mar 1943	VB-41	Bombing squadron
4 Aug 1943	VB-4	Bombing squadron
15 Nov 1946	VA-1A	Attack squadron
2 Aug 1948	VA-14	Attack squadron
15 Dec 1949	VF-14	Fighter squadron
1 Dec 2001	VFA-14	Strike fighter squadron

=== Early years ===
The squadron began carrier operations on board the Navy's first aircraft carrier USS Langley in 1926. The squadron, then designated Fighter Plane Squadron One, set the record for carrier landings in a single day. Flying the TS-1, they logged 127 traps by the end of flight operations.

In 1929, the squadron was assigned to USS Saratoga, where it began as a fighter squadron and transitioned to a bomber squadron. Throughout the 1930s, it flew the Boeing FB-5, Boeing F2B, Boeing F4B, Curtiss F11C Goshawk, Curtiss SBC Helldiver and the SB2U-1 Vindicator. In 1939, while flying the Vindicator, the squadron was transferred to the Atlantic Fleet and USS Ranger.

=== 1940s ===
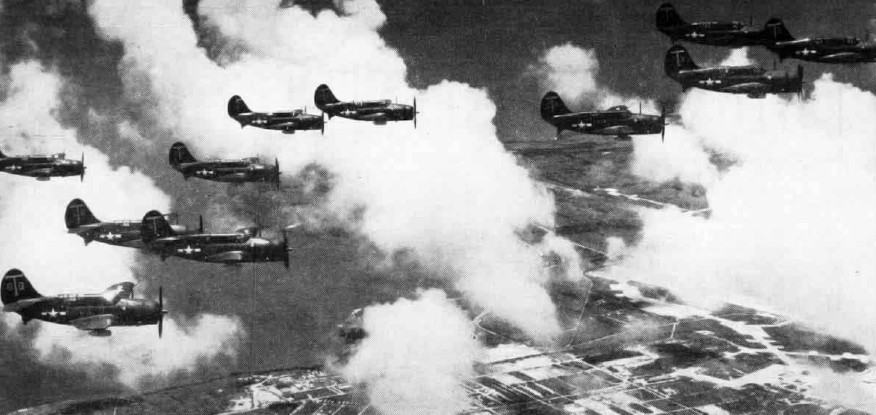
VB-4 SB2C-5s in 1947

While on Ranger, the squadron provided air support for the Allied invasion of North Africa in November 1942. During the four days of 8 – 11 November, the pilots destroyed 16 enemy aircraft. Flying the Douglas SBD Dauntless dive bomber, the squadron participated in Operation Leader, the only American naval air strike against German forces in Norway.

In November 1944, the squadron transferred to the Pacific Fleet, and participated in the Leyte Campaign while attached to USS Bunker Hill. After transferring to USS Essex, the squadron bombed fortifications on Formosa in January 1945, supported the assault on Iwo Jima in February, participated in the first naval carrier strike on Tokyo, and completed Pacific combat operations with strikes on Okinawa in early March 1945.

After the war's end, VB-4 made four cruises aboard USS Tarawa, including a world cruise between 28 September 1948 and 21 February 1949, after which the squadron was based on the US East Coast. On 15 November 1946 VB-4 became Attack Squadron 1A (VA-1A), and in August 1948 the squadron was again redesignated Attack Squadron 14 (VA-14) and transitioned from the SB2C-5 Helldiver to the F4U-4 Corsair. In December 1949 VA-14 was redesignated Fighter Squadron 14 (VF-14).

=== 1950s ===
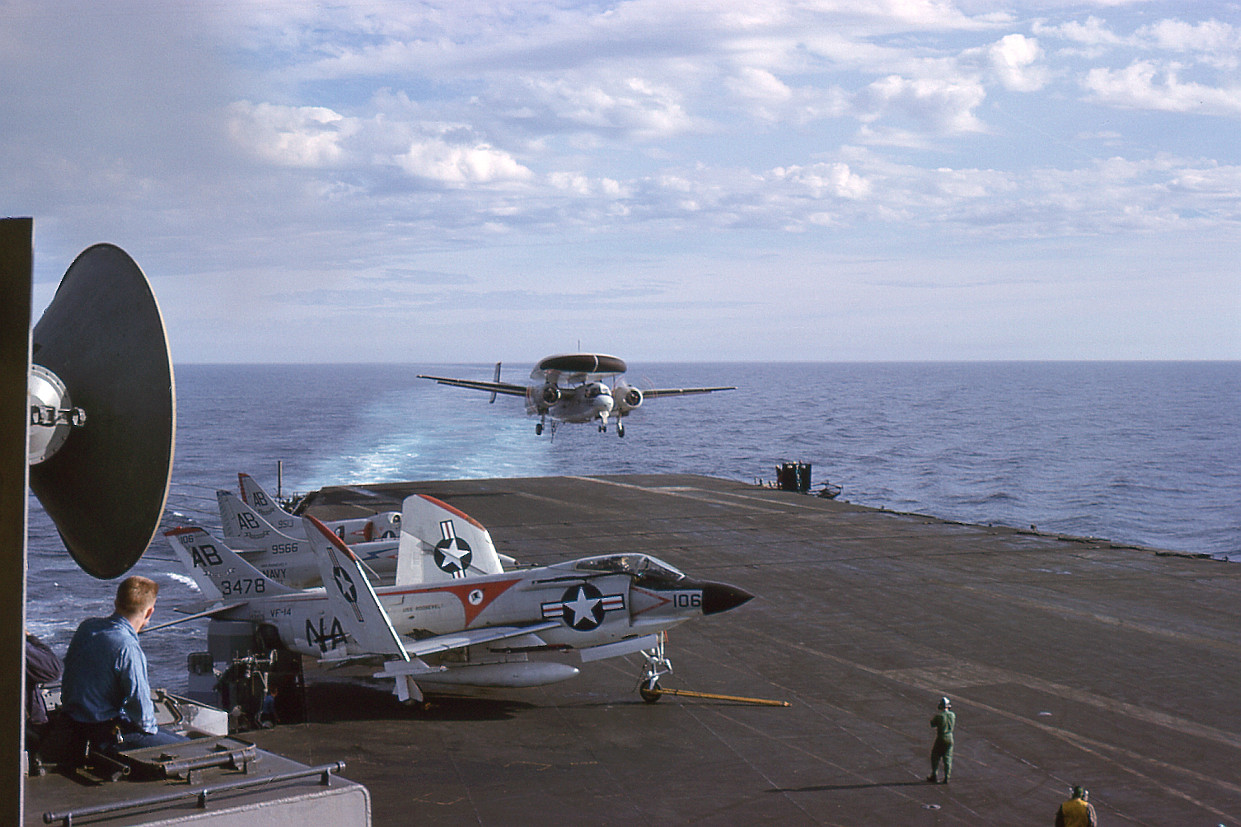
A VF-14 F-3B on the USS Franklin D. Roosevelt, in 1962–63

In 1951 and 1952, VF-14 made two deployments to the Mediterranean Sea aboard the modernized USS Wasp, still flying the F4U Corsair. In 1953, they deployed in USS Franklin D. Roosevelt on another Med cruise with Air Task Group (ATG-201), (which included VF-11, VA-12, VF-13, AND VA-15). In 1954, VF-14 took on the role of all-weather interceptor when they transitioned to the F3D-2 Skyknight, but only made a three-months deployment aboard USS Intrepid in late 1954. As the F3D proved unsuitable for carrier operations, the squadron transitioned to the F3H-2N Demon in 1955. VF-14 made two deployments aboard USS Forrestal in 1957. The squadron was then re-equipped with F3H-2s. VF-14 and its parent CVG-1 were then reassigned to Franklin D. Roosevelt and made eight deployments to the Mediterranean Sea up to 1969.

=== 1960s ===
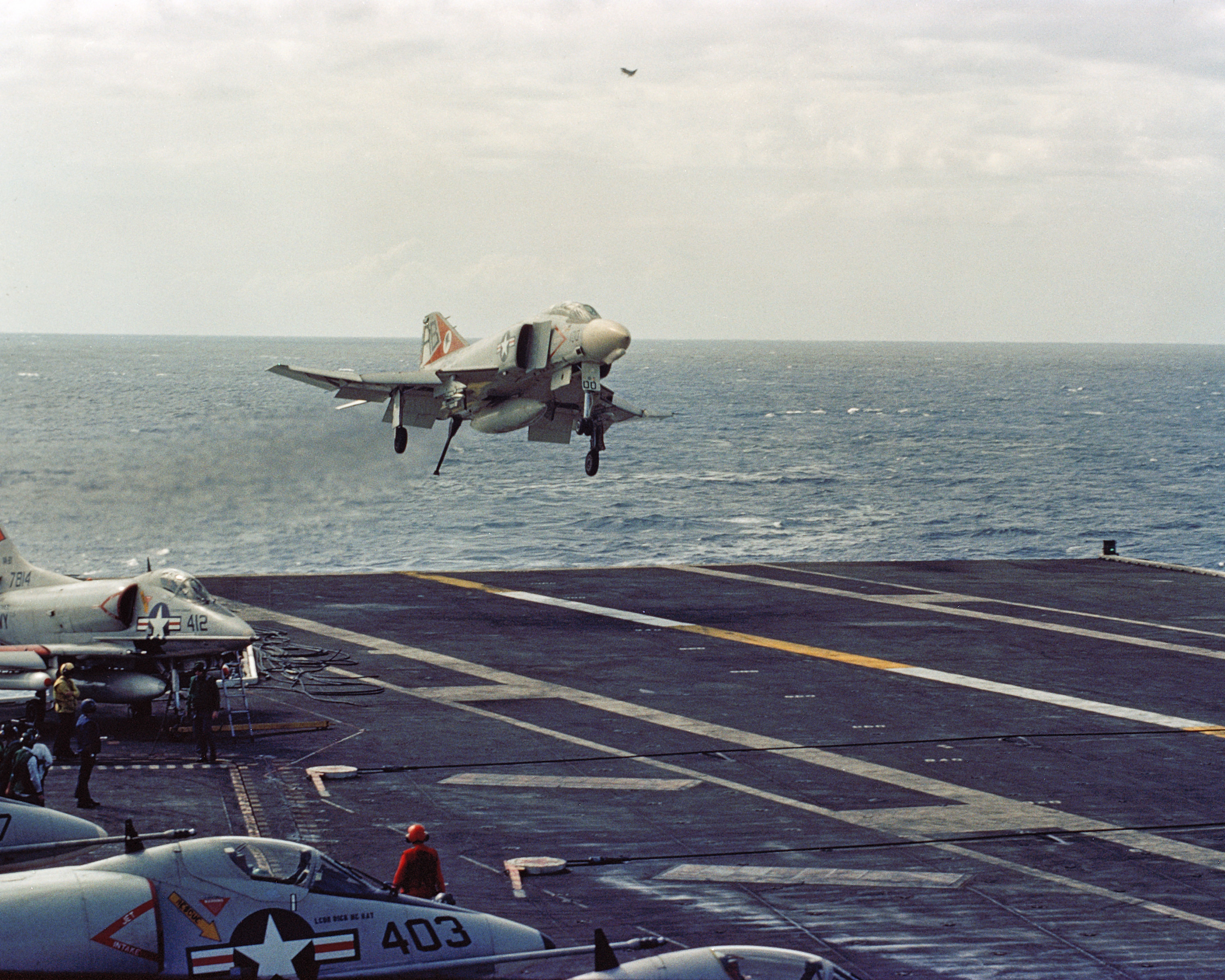
VF-14 F-4B landing on USS John F. Kennedy in 1968

In May 1963, the squadron transitioned to the F-4B Phantom II and on 23 January 1964 they became the first Phantom squadron to operate onboard Franklin D. Roosevelt. In June 1966, after moving to NAS Oceana, the squadron deployed to the South China Sea to conduct air strikes and support missions against military targets in North Vietnam. During this combat deployment, the squadron flew 1,688 hours on 967 combat sorties and delivered 651,624 pounds of ordnance, in addition to flying its traditional combat air patrol and fighter escort missions. When Franklin D. Roosevelt entered the Norfolk Naval Shipyard for modernization, CVW-1 and VF-14 were reassigned to USS John F. Kennedy in 1969 and stayed with it for nine deployments until 1982.

=== 1970s ===
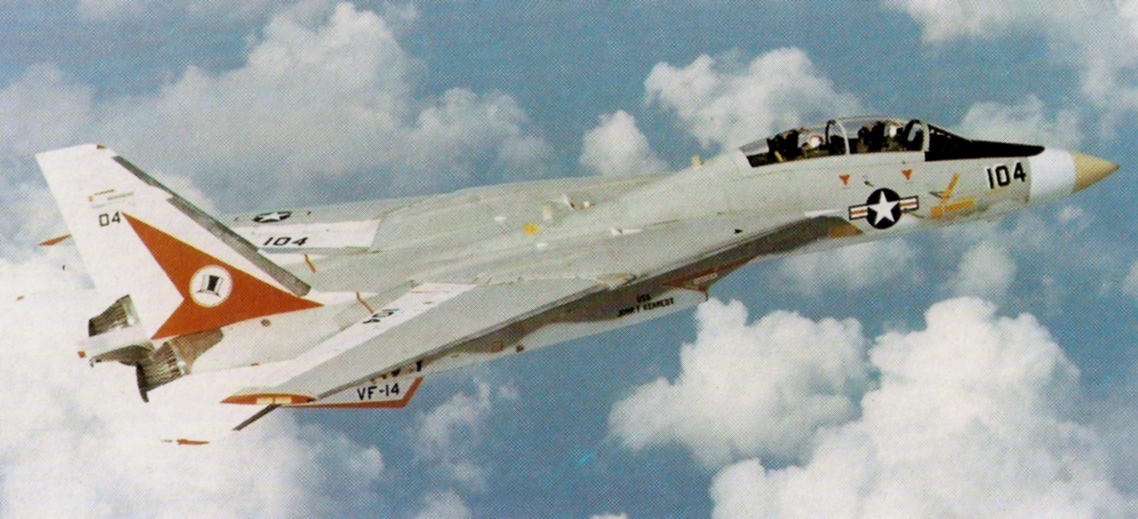
VF-14 F-14A in 1975

In January 1974, after four Mediterranean deployments, the squadron transitioned to the Navy's newest fighter, the F-14A Tomcat at NAS Miramar and was teamed with VF-32 as the first two Tomcat squadrons to arrive at NAS Oceana. In June 1975 they became the first Atlantic squadron to deploy with the F-14A alongside VF-32 aboard USS John F. Kennedy. In October 1978, the squadron set an all-time F-14 flight hour record when they flew 977 hours in one month while deployed in the Mediterranean.

In 1976, VF-14 launched the 100th AIM-54 Phoenix missile against a simulated cruise missile at a range of 32 miles (51 km), killing it at a range of 65 miles (105 km) from John F. Kennedy. During the same cruise, VF-14 intercepted a Soviet Tu-95 on 21 July. VF-14 escorted the bomber for around 45 minutes, during which the Soviet bomber made two passes over John F. Kennedy.

=== 1980s ===
In August 1980, the squadron deployed to the Mediterranean Sea on John F Kennedy. During this deployment, VF-14 won the Silver Anchor Award and the Battle "E" Award for combat readiness, for the second year in a row. The achievements that contributed to the awards included 3 missile firing exercises with a 100% kill ratio, first East Coast TCS installations and 26,500 accident free flying hours over the space of 8 years.

In June 1982 VF-14 was reassigned to Carrier Air Wing 6 aboard USS Independence, and in July was named the "Best Fighter Squadron" for its performance in the Fleet Fighter Air Combat Readiness Program (FFARP).

In October and early November 1983 the squadron supported Operation Urgent Fury the American-led Invasion of Grenada to protect approximately 1,000 American medical students following a violent Marxist coup, eliminate a growing Cuban/Soviet military presence in the Caribbean, and restore political stability after the assassination of Prime Minister Maurice Bishop.

Following this, VF-14 proceeded east to the Mediterranean to participate in contingency operations off the coast of Lebanon. In early December 1983, the Tophatters were again called upon to provide combat air support for the elements of the multi-national forces in Beirut.

On 1 April 1985, the squadron returned to John F. Kennedy, where they spent the rest of the year on a turnaround-training schedule, which included eleven detachments to various parts of the United States and Canada. Although again aboard John F. Kennedy, VF-14 was now assigned to Carrier Air Wing 3.

On 18 April 1986, the squadron departed for the Mediterranean once again and were extended on deployment due to the Lebanon hostage crisis. Upon their return to the United States, the squadron was again proclaimed the "Best Fighter Squadron" by winning the 1987 FFARP award.

In 1989, VF-14 was presented with the "Grand Slam" award in recognition of their perfect missile firing record. The squadron entered 1990 conducting workups for deployment and making portcalls in Portland, Mayport, New York City and Boston. During exercises off Puerto Rico, the squadron operated against French Super Étendard and F-8 Crusaders from the French aircraft carrier Foch.

=== 1990s ===
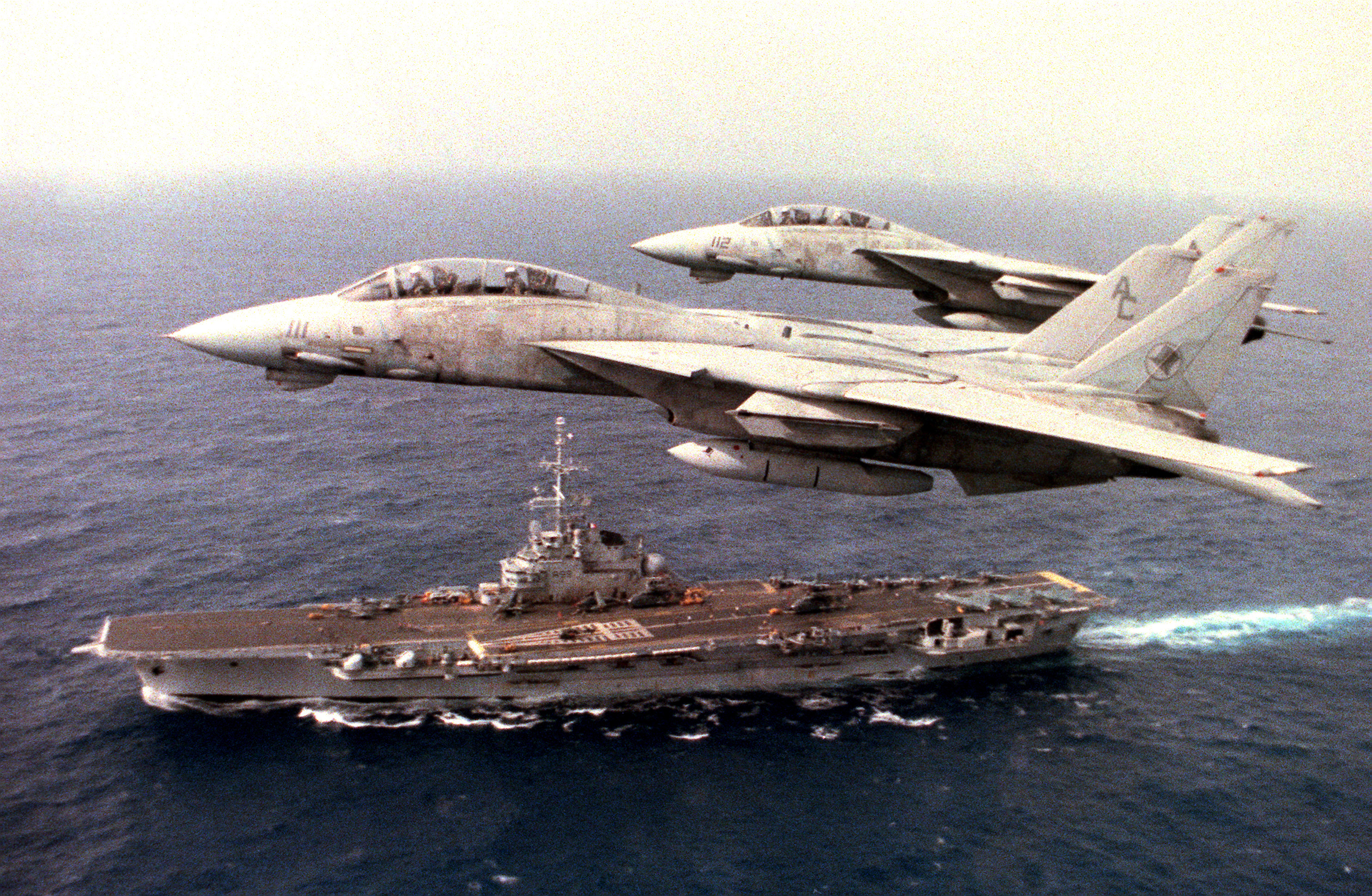
VF-14 F-14s overfly Foch during 1990 dual carrier operations near Puerto Rico

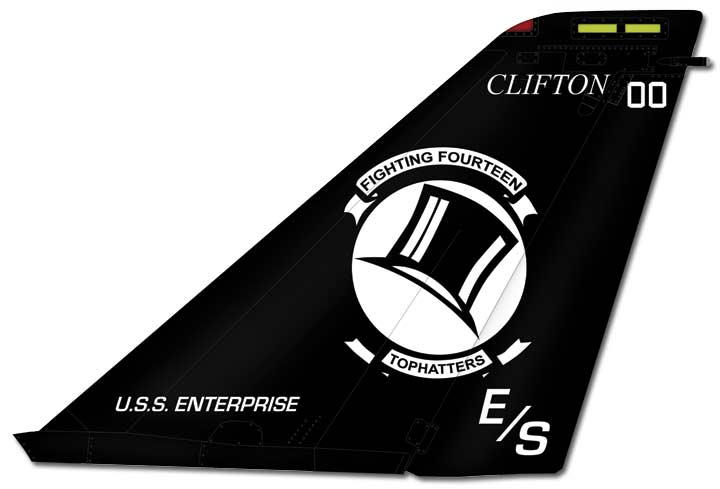
VF-14 F-14 tail markings

On 10 August 1990, eight days after the Iraqi Invasion of Kuwait, the squadron was ordered to emergency deploy to the Red Sea aboard John F. Kennedy to take part in Operation Desert Shield. During the months leading up to the war, the squadron assisted in enforcing the Iraqi embargo flying combat air patrol (CAP) and standing alert duty continuously. On the morning of 17 January 1991, the squadron once again flew into combat when they joined United Nations forces in the air assault on Iraq. VF-14 and VF-32 flew CAP and fighter escort missions for CVW-3 strike and support aircraft throughout Desert Storm operating in Western and Central Iraq initially and then conducting long range barrier CAP missions in eastern Iraq near the Iranian border with other Tomcat squadrons from the Red Sea and the Persian Gulf that lasted an unprecedented 7–8 hours. After combat operations ended, John F. Kennedy remained briefly in the Red Sea stopping off the coast of Egypt for a portcall before returning to NAS Oceana after eight months at sea.

In December 1991, VF-14 became one of the first squadrons to begin training for the Tomcat's new air-to-ground mission. After low altitude flight training and several strike-related schools, the squadron put their new skills to the test during Air Wing work-ups in Fallon, Nevada.

In October 1992, the squadron again headed east for a Mediterranean deployment. Once past the Rock of Gibraltar, VF-14 began flying air superiority and reconnaissance missions in the Adriatic Sea in support of UN policies in the former Yugoslavia. During this deployment, the squadron also participated in several exercises with Egypt, Morocco and Turkey, while continuing to support operations off the coast of the former Yugoslavia and Operation Provide Comfort in Iraq.

In 1995, the squadron was the test bed for the Tomcat air-to-ground rockets program. The squadron was awarded the Fighter Fling Banner Blaster award for their superior performance in the air-to-air gunnery arena.

In late 1995, the squadron was detached from CVW-3 when the Navy began reducing the number of Tomcat squadrons to carrier air wings from two to one and retaining the TARPS-capable squadrons. As a non-TARPS squadron, VF-14 was originally slated for disestablishment and temporarily assigned to Fighter Wing One at NAS Oceana. The following year saw much uncertainty for many Tomcat squadrons, but a grassroots campaign to continue the lineage of the Navy's oldest squadron was successful in saving the squadron from extinction and the squadron was assigned to Carrier Air Wing 8, which was losing VF-84, with sister squadron VF-41.

In January 1996, the squadron once again rejoined John F. Kennedy. In March, the squadron deployed on USS John C. Stennis. In June the squadron took a 40-day cruise aboard John F. Kennedy to Ireland and England. Next, VF-14 visited the Mediterranean and other areas.

During March 1998, VF-14 changed its home to USS Theodore Roosevelt. In 1999, the squadron participated in NATO's Operation Allied Force and in Operation Southern Watch. VF-14 dropped more than 395,000 pounds of ordnance on various targets in support of Operation Allied Force, and guided 190 different weapons fired from other aircraft onto targets, including laser guided bombs and laser guided AGM-65 Maverick missiles, scoring a 100% success rate while guiding AGM-65 Maverick missiles

=== 2000s ===
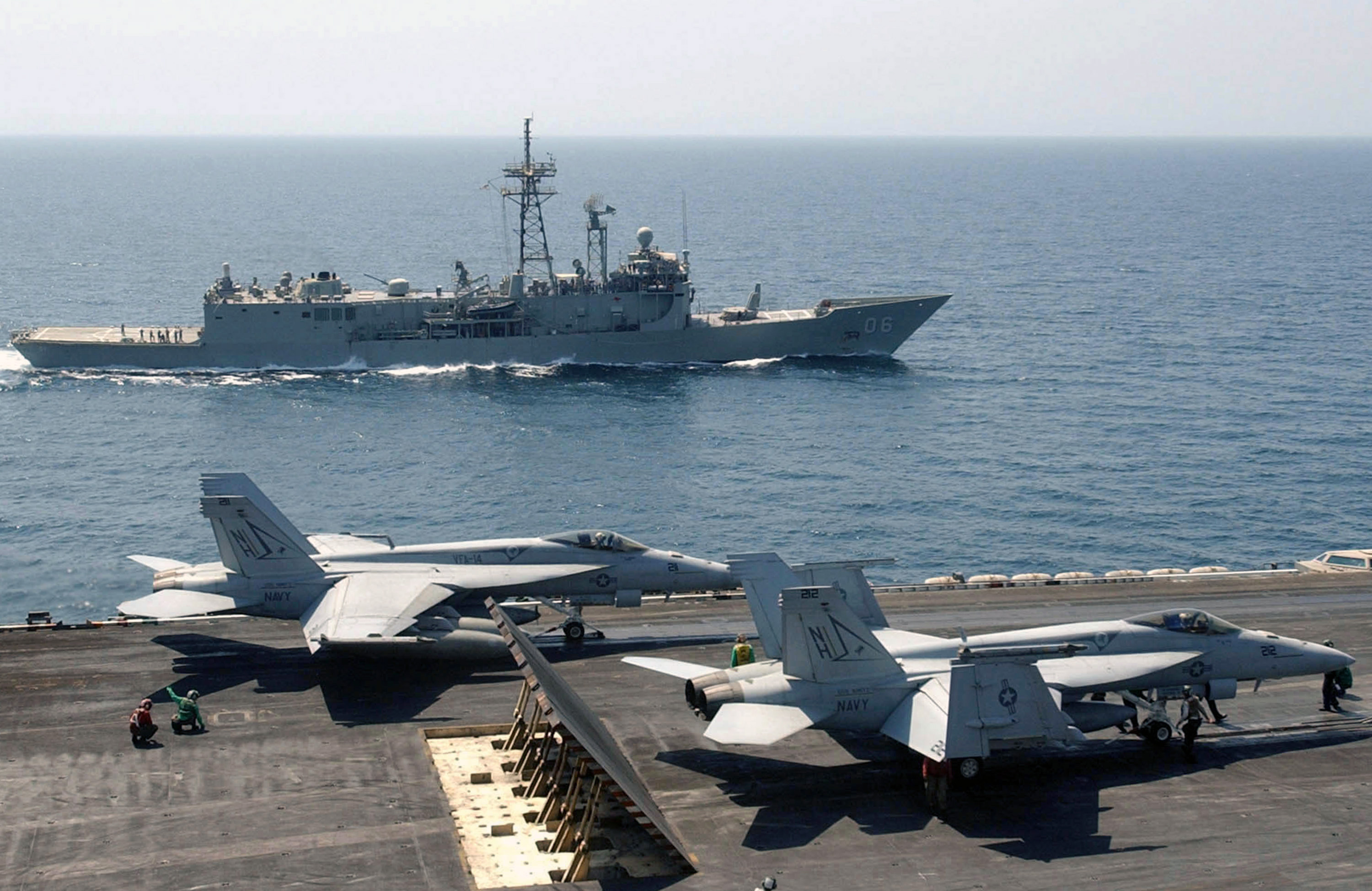
VFA-14 F/A-18Es aboard USS Nimitz

In April 2001, VF-14 embarked on their final F-14 cruise on board USS Enterprise, supporting Operation Southern Watch and Operation Enduring Freedom. As the carrier headed for home and on its way to South Africa they were given order to head to the North Persian Gulf after the September 11 attacks. USS Enterprise/CVW-8 had been elected to be the night carrier during Operation Enduring Freedom and thus did not see action until 8 October, VF-14 attacked a radar warning installation near Kabul during CVW-8's initial strike, which had been envisioned to have a section of F/A-18s, a section of F-14s from VF-14 and an EA-6B from VAQ-141, but due to insufficient fuel available for the Hornets, only the F-14s and the EA-6B pressed on. After their return to the US in November, VF-14 had dropped 173,324 lbs of ordnance (174 laser-guided bombs), VF-14 also buddy-lased 28 AGM-65s and 23 laser-guided bombs.

After their last F-14 cruise VF-14 and VF-41 relocated to NAS Lemoore and began the transition to the F/A-18 Super Hornet switching to CVW-11 and USS Nimitz. Both squadrons deployed to participate in Operation Iraqi Freedom (OIF) aboard USS Nimitz and prior to arrival in the Persian Gulf, two VF-14 F/A-18Es and two F/A-18Fs (VFA-41) were forward deployed to USS Abraham Lincoln in late March 2003 to augment its airwing. The Super Hornets were requested to boost the air refueling capabilities of CVW-14 as well as qualified Forward Air Controllers, Airborne (FAC (A)) (the F/A-18Fs). The division of F/A-18s flew from USS Nimitz to USS Abraham Lincoln, a 2,700-mile (4,300 km) trip. On 6 April, the Hornets returned to USS Nimitz. During OIF, VFA-14 expended laser-guided bombs, JDAM bombs and AGM-65 missiles and conducted numerous long-range missions to northern Baghdad and Tikrit.

After its OIF cruise in 2003, VFA-14 conducted Air Wing training at NAS Fallon and made the maiden deployment with USS Ronald Reagan in 2004, the cruise took them from Virginia to California around South America. After work-ups in 2004 they deployed for a 2005 cruise, supporting OIF and flying over 2,100 sorties and over 4,300 flight hours.

In 2006, VFA-14 made detachments to NAS Fallon and a joint exercise with the Royal Air Force to Scotland. Training continued through 2006 with a Strike Fighter Advance Readiness Program (SFARP) with a three-week detachment to NAS Fallon. VFA-14 and CVW-11 participated in Navy Fleet Week in San Francisco in early October. During this period, two F/A-18Es made a flyover during a San Francisco 49ers football game. Training continued into 2007 in preparation for the up-coming GULF/WESTPAC deployment in support of OIF and OEF, and exercise Valiant Shield near Guam.

On 18 January 2008, it was announced that CVW-11 would deploy on 24 January to the Pacific for a surge-deployment on board Nimitz.

During 2009 CVW-11 and the Nimitz Strike Group conducted several training exercises off the coast of Southern California including composite unit training and joint task force training in anticipation for their 2009–2010 deployment. On 28 July it was reported that CVW-11 and the Nimitz Strike Group was to depart for a seven-month deployment.

=== 2010s ===
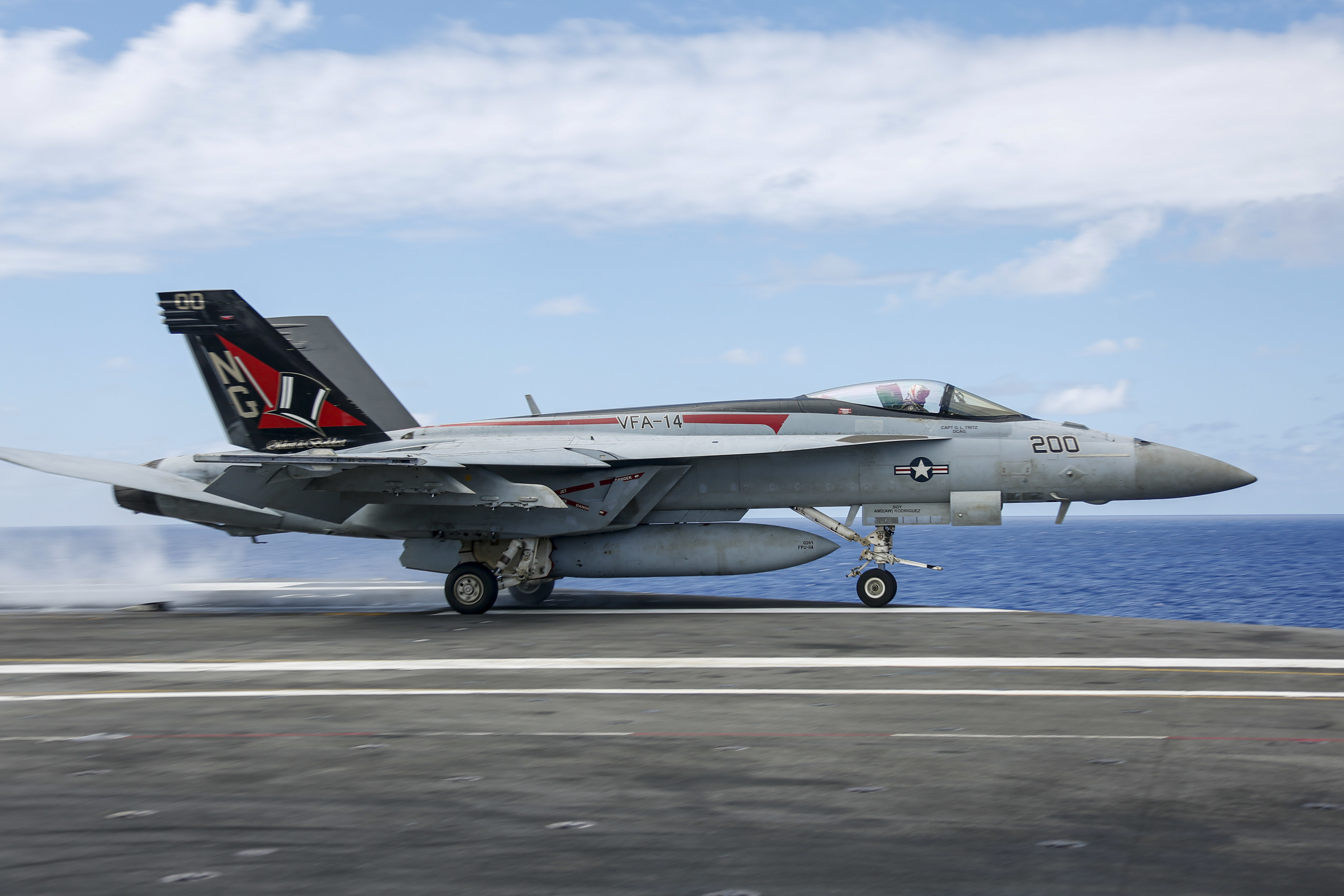
VFA-14 FA-18E Super Hornet launches from USS Abraham Lincoln (CVN-72) in 2022

VFA-14 and VFA-41 changed air wings and carriers to CVW-9 and USS John C. Stennis and on 27 July 2011 CVW-9 deployed on board USS John C. Stennis to support operations in Iraq and Afghanistan, counter-piracy and maritime security operations. VFA-14 conducted combat flights in support of Operations Inherent Resolve, Resolute Support and Freedom Sentinel over Afghanistan, Iraq, and Syria. The squadron returned to NAS Lemoore, North Island, Point Mugu, and Whidbey Island in May 2019.

=== 2020s ===
VFA-14 participated in dual carrier operations in the South China Sea with the Carl Vinson Carrier Strike, as well as joint exercise Valiant Shield in June 2022, and bilateral exercises Noble Fusion in February and Jungle Warfare in March, both with the Japanese Self-Defense Force, and, most recently, VFA-14 trained alongside 26 participating nations during Exercise Rim of the Pacific (RIMPAC) 2022 in July.

In early August 2024, the squadron was deployed on the USS Abraham Lincoln in response to heightened tensions between Iran and Israel. While in the CENTCOM theater, VFA-14 conducted extensive combat operations.

In late Feb 2026, as part of CVW 9, VFA-14 and their F/A-18Es operating off the USS Abraham Lincoln, undertook combat sorties within Operation Epic Fury against Iran.

== Notable members ==
- Ted Carter - Former VFA-14 Skipper
- Cassady Campbell - YouTuber
- Mike Garcia - Former Congressman from California

== See also ==
- History of the United States Navy
- List of United States Navy aircraft squadrons

== Notes ==
- VF-14 1973 history
- VFA-14 1974 history
- Tony Holmes (2005). US Navy Hornet Units of Operation Iraqi Freedom Part One, Osprey Publishing Limited.
- Tony Holmes (2015). F-14 Bombcat The US Navy's Ultimate Precision Bomber, Key Publishing Limited.
