= Fairey Prince =

Fairey Prince may refer to:

- Fairey P.12 Prince, a British experimental V-12 aircraft engine
- Fairey P.16 Prince, a British experimental 16-cylinder H-type aircraft engine
