= Boeing XP-4 =

Fighter aircraft prototype by Boeing

XP-4
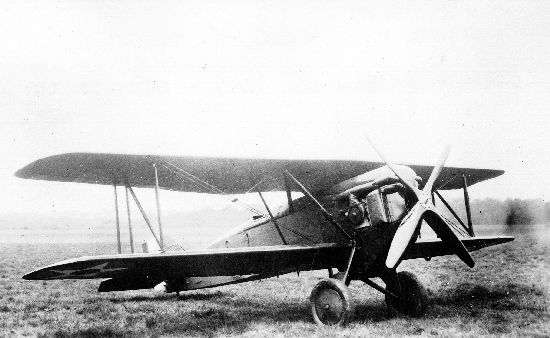
- Boeing XP-4 during trials

General information
- Type: Fighter
- National origin: United States
- Manufacturer: Boeing
- Number built: 1

History
- First flight: 1927
- Developed from: Boeing Model 15

The Boeing XP-4 was a prototype American biplane fighter of the 1920s. It was grounded permanently after just 4.5 hours of flight testing.

== Development and design ==
In 1926, the United States Army was very interested in the turbo-supercharger as a way of improving engine performance, and requested that one be added to the last of the PW-9s, and the engine upgraded to a 510 hp Packard 1A-1500. This machine was designated XP-4.

In addition, the basic PW-9 armament of one .50 and one .30 cal. machine guns in the nose were supplemented by two added .30 cal. guns mounted under the lower wing, far enough out to be outside the propeller arc (thus not needing synchronization).

All these modifications added weight, so the lower wing span was extended by 9.5 feet.

The airplane was delivered to Wright Field for testing on 27 July 1927, but it quickly became apparent that the Packard engine did not have sufficient power to compensate for the 800 lbs of extra weight, the craft performing more poorly than its predecessor, and the project was quickly abandoned.

== Specifications (XP-4) ==
Data from Fighters of the United States Air Force

General characteristics

- Crew: One
- Length: 23 ft 11 in (7.29 m)
- Wingspan: 32 ft 1 in (9.78 m)
- Height: 8 ft 10 in (2.69 m)
- Wing area: 245 sq ft (22.8 m^{2})
- Empty weight: 2,783 lb (1,264 kg)
- Max takeoff weight: 3,650 lb (1,655 kg)
- Powerplant: 1 × Packard 1A-1500 supercharged liquid-cooled piston engine, 510 hp (380 kW)

Performance

- Maximum speed: 146 kn (168 mph, 270 km/h)
- Cruise speed: 104 kn (120 mph, 193 km/h)
- Range: 326 nmi (375 mi, 604 km)
- Service ceiling: 22,850 ft (6,965 m)
- Rate of climb: 1,400 ft/min (7.1 m/s)

Armament

- Guns: one 0.3 in and one 0.5 in machine guns firing through propeller disc plus two wing mounted 0.3 in machine guns

== See also ==
Related lists

- List of military aircraft of the United States
- List of fighter aircraft
