= Douglas XA-2 =

American attack aircraft prototype

XA-2
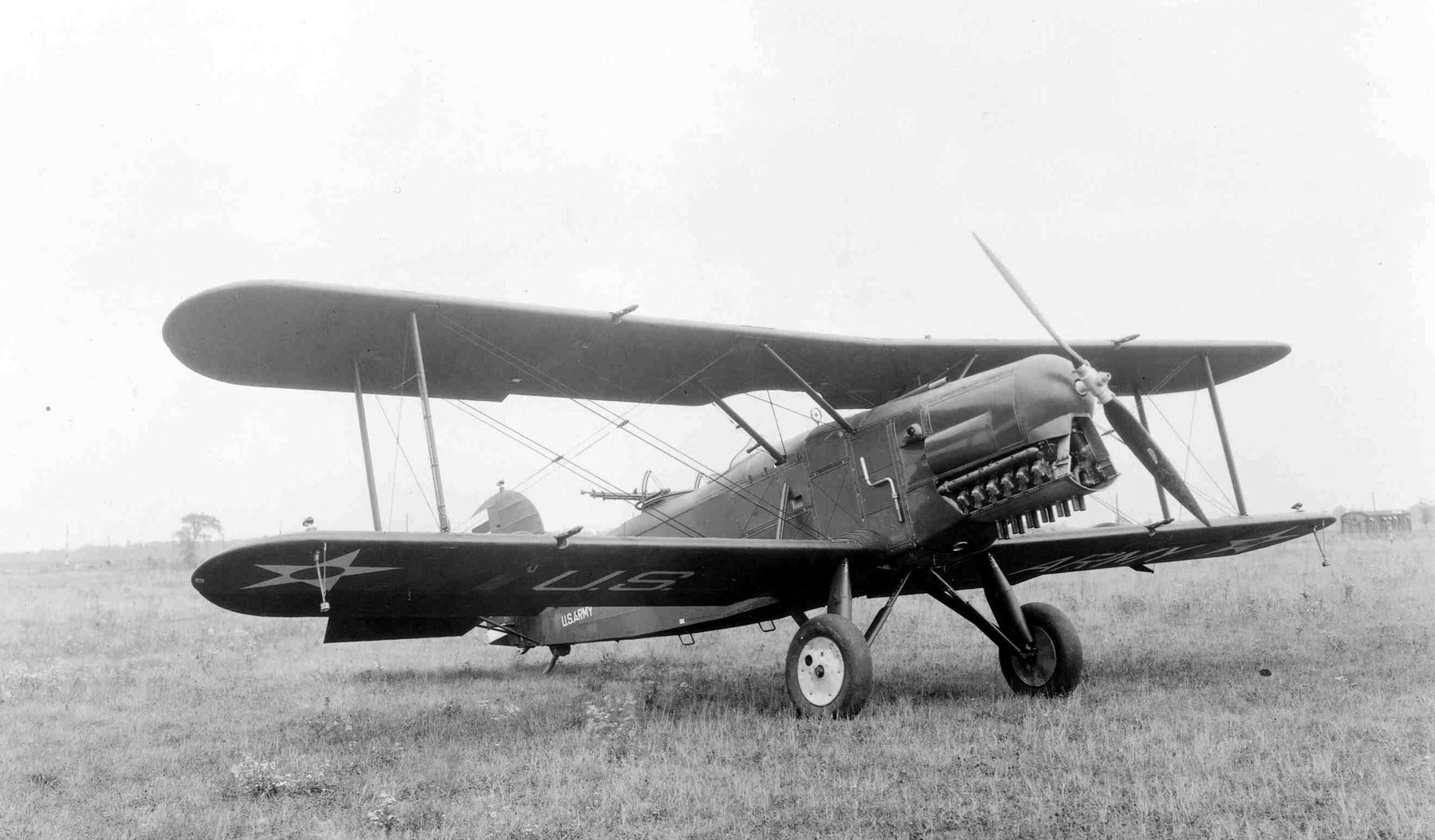
- Douglas XA-2 with removed cowling on the lower nose to enhance engine cooling

General information
- Type: Attack aircraft
- National origin: United States
- Manufacturer: Douglas Aircraft Company
- Status: Prototype
- Primary user: United States Army Air Corps
- Number built: 1

History
- Developed from: Douglas O-2

The Douglas XA-2 was an American prototype attack aircraft converted from a Douglas O-2 observation aircraft in the spring of 1926 by Douglas Aircraft. Only one prototype aircraft was built and the type was not ordered into production.

== Design and development ==
One Douglas O-2, serial number 25-380, was modified for the new role as an attack aircraft. While the basic structure of the aircraft remained, there were several modifications made. The water-cooled Liberty engine (V-1650) of the O-2 was replaced by an inverted air-cooled Allison VG-1410 engine. The lower engine cowlings were omitted to allow for more cooling air flow over the engine.

Second, the XA-2 was more heavily armed than the O-2. It had six forward-firing .30-caliber Browning machine guns - two in the nose forward of the cockpit, and two each in the mid-upper and lower wings. Two .30-caliber Lewis guns were put on a flexible mount for use by the observer-gunner in rear defense of the aircraft. The aircraft also had the capacity for a small bomb load of 100 lb (45 kg).

The Douglas XA-2 was evaluated against the Curtiss XA-3 (a conversion of the Curtiss O-1B observation plane). The Douglas Aircraft won the initial competition, but the Army realized that the Liberty engine was both underpowered and in dwindling supply. It ordered a second competition with both models upgraded with Packard 1A-1500 engines. The Curtiss aircraft won this time and became the U.S. Army Air Corps' frontline attack aircraft (Curtiss A-3 Attack Falcon) from 1928 to 1935.

== Operators ==
United States

- United States Army Air Corps

== Specifications (XA-2) ==
General characteristics

- Crew: Two (pilot & observer / gunner)
- Length: 29 ft 7 in (9.02 m)
- Wingspan: 39 ft 8 in (12.09 m)
- Height: 11 ft (3.4 m)
- Max takeoff weight: 4,985 lb (2,261 kg)
- Powerplant: 1 × Allison VG-1410 inverted air-cooled V-12 piston engine, 433 hp (323 kW)

Performance

- Maximum speed: 130 mph (210 km/h, 110 kn)
- Cruise speed: 100 mph (160 km/h, 87 kn)
- Range: 400 mi (640 km, 350 nmi)
- Service ceiling: 15,000 ft (4,600 m)

Armament

- Guns:
  - 6 × forward firing .30-cal. (7.62 mm) Browning machine guns, two in the fuselage + one in each wing
  - 2 × flexible .30-cal. Lewis machine guns
- Bombs: Provision for 100 lb (45 kg) of bombs mounted on lower wing racks

== See also ==
Related development

- Douglas O-2

Aircraft of comparable role, configuration, and era

- A-3 Falcon

Related lists

- List of military aircraft of the United States

== Bibliography ==
- Francillon, René (1988). McDonnell Douglas Aircraft since 1920. Vol. I. Annapolis, Maryland: Naval Institute Press. ISBN 0-85177-827-5.
