= Douglas O-38 =

1931 observation aircraft family by Douglas

O-38
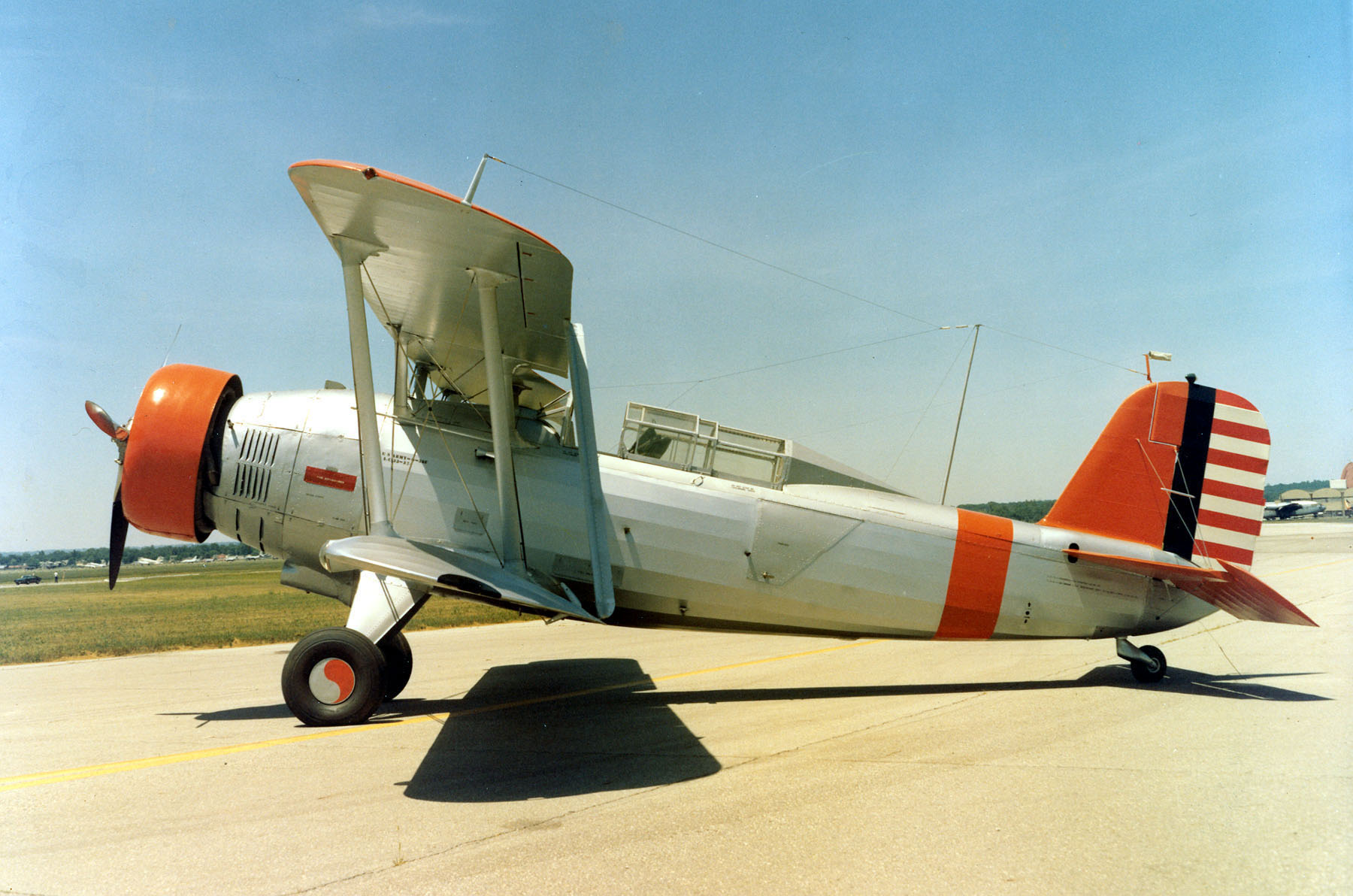
- Douglas O-38F at the National Museum of the United States Air Force in 2005

General information
- Type: Observation plane
- Manufacturer: Douglas Aircraft Company
- Primary user: United States Army Air Corps
- Number built: 156

History
- Manufactured: 1931–1934

The Douglas O-38 is an observation airplane used by the United States Army Air Corps in the 1930s and early 1940s.

Between 1931 and 1934, Douglas built 156 O-38s for the Air Corps, eight of which were O-38Fs. Some were still in service at the time of the Pearl Harbor Attack in 1941.

The O-38 is a modernized derivative of the O-25, itself a re-engined variant of the earlier Douglas O-2.

== Variants ==
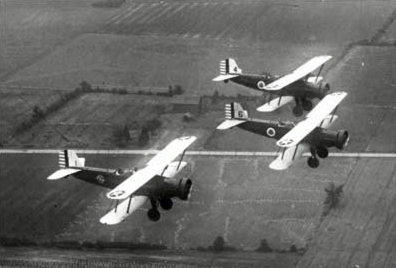
O-38Bs from the 112th Observation Squadron, Ohio National Guard, in 1936.

O-38
derivative of the Curtiss Conqueror-engined O-25 but with a 525-hp (391-kW) Pratt & Whitney R-1690-3 radial engine and Townend ring cowling; the National Guard received all 44 production aircraft
O-38A
single unarmed O-38 staff liaison machine for the National Guard

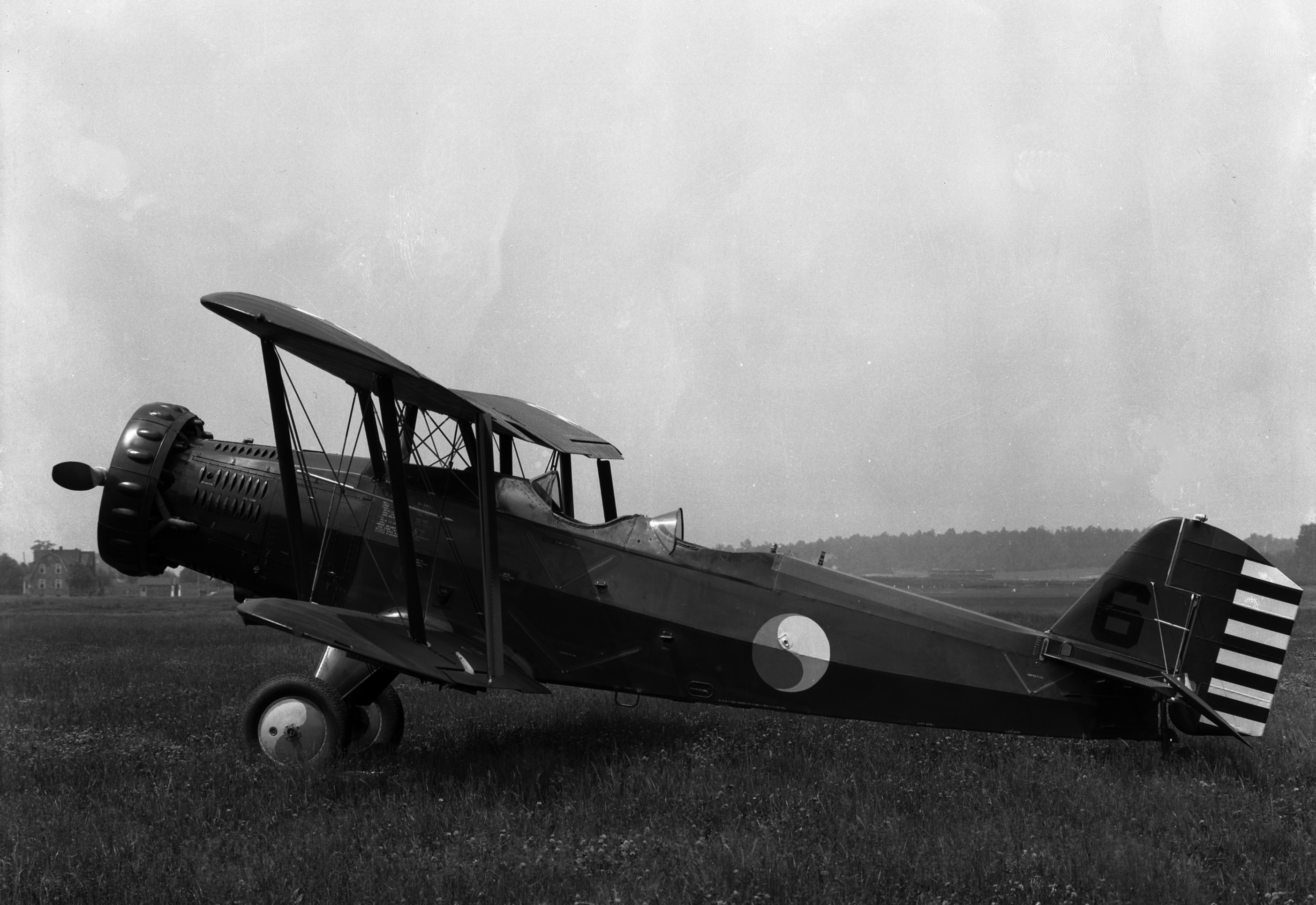
O-38B for the Maryland National Guard

O-38B
derivative of the O-38 with an R-1690-5 engine; total production was 63, comprising 30 for USAAC observation squadrons and 33 for the National Guard
O-38C
single aircraft similar to the O-38B for use by US Coast Guard

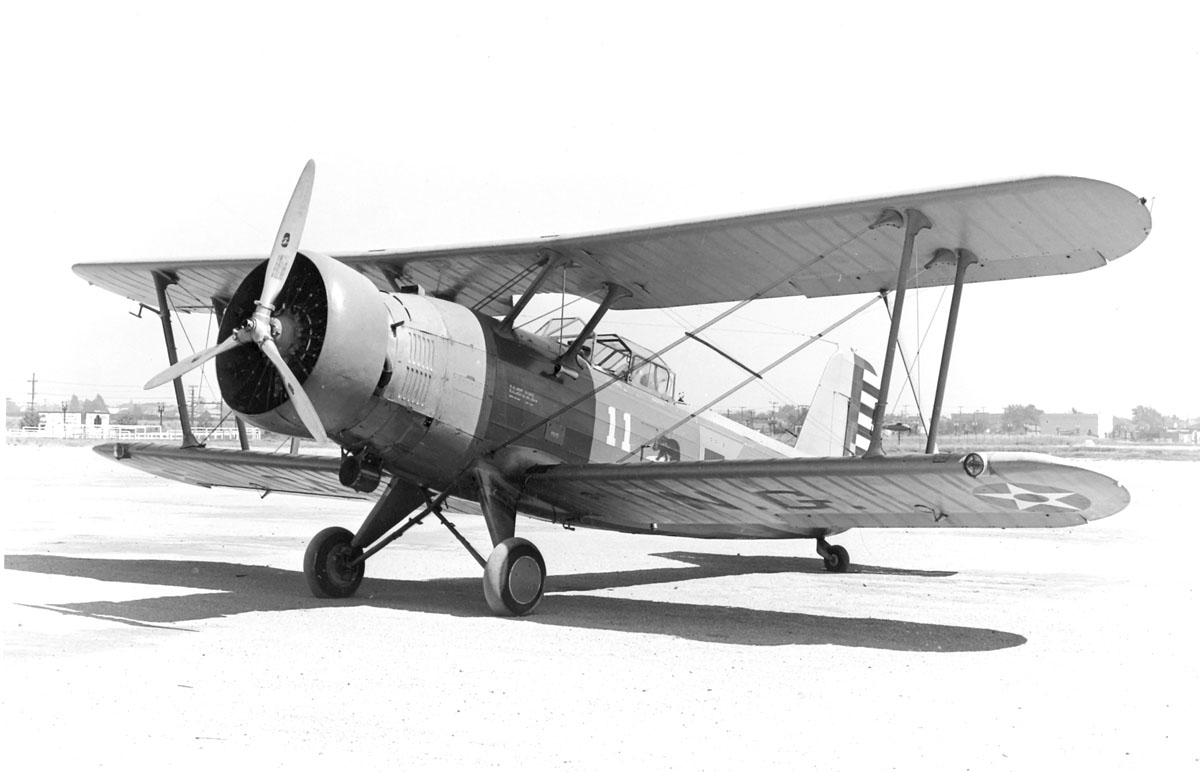
O-38E

O-38E
model with a wider and deeper fuselage on the lines of the private-venture O-38S, with a sliding canopy over the cockpits and a 625-hp (466-kW) R-1690-13 radial engine driving a metal propeller; could be operated on twin Edo floats; the National Guard took delivery of 37 such aircraft
O-38F
eight unarmed staff liaison aircraft delivered to the National Guard in 1933 with an R-1690-9 engine and a revised, fully enclosed canopy
O-38P
Almost identical to the E/F series. Six aircraft delivered to Perú in February 1933, fitted with Edo floats; Three took part in the conflict against Colombia, and took part in air combats against Colombian Curtiss Hawk IIs, one being lost as consequence of damage received during those clashes. Survivors were converted to wheels, and served as trainers until 1940.
O-38S
private-venture development of the O-38 with a wider and deeper fuselage, crew canopy and a smooth-cowled 575 hp (429 kW) Wright R-1820-E Cyclone radial engine; in effect was the prototype of the O-38E
A-6
proposed use of the O-38 as a radio-controlled target drone (cancelled)

== Operators ==
Colombia

- Colombian Air Force - One captured from Peru in 1933 and returned to Peru in 1934.

Haiti

- Haiti Air Corps - Six delivered in June 1942. Retired in 1948.

Peru

- Peruvian Navy

United States

- United States Army Air Corps

== Surviving aircraft ==
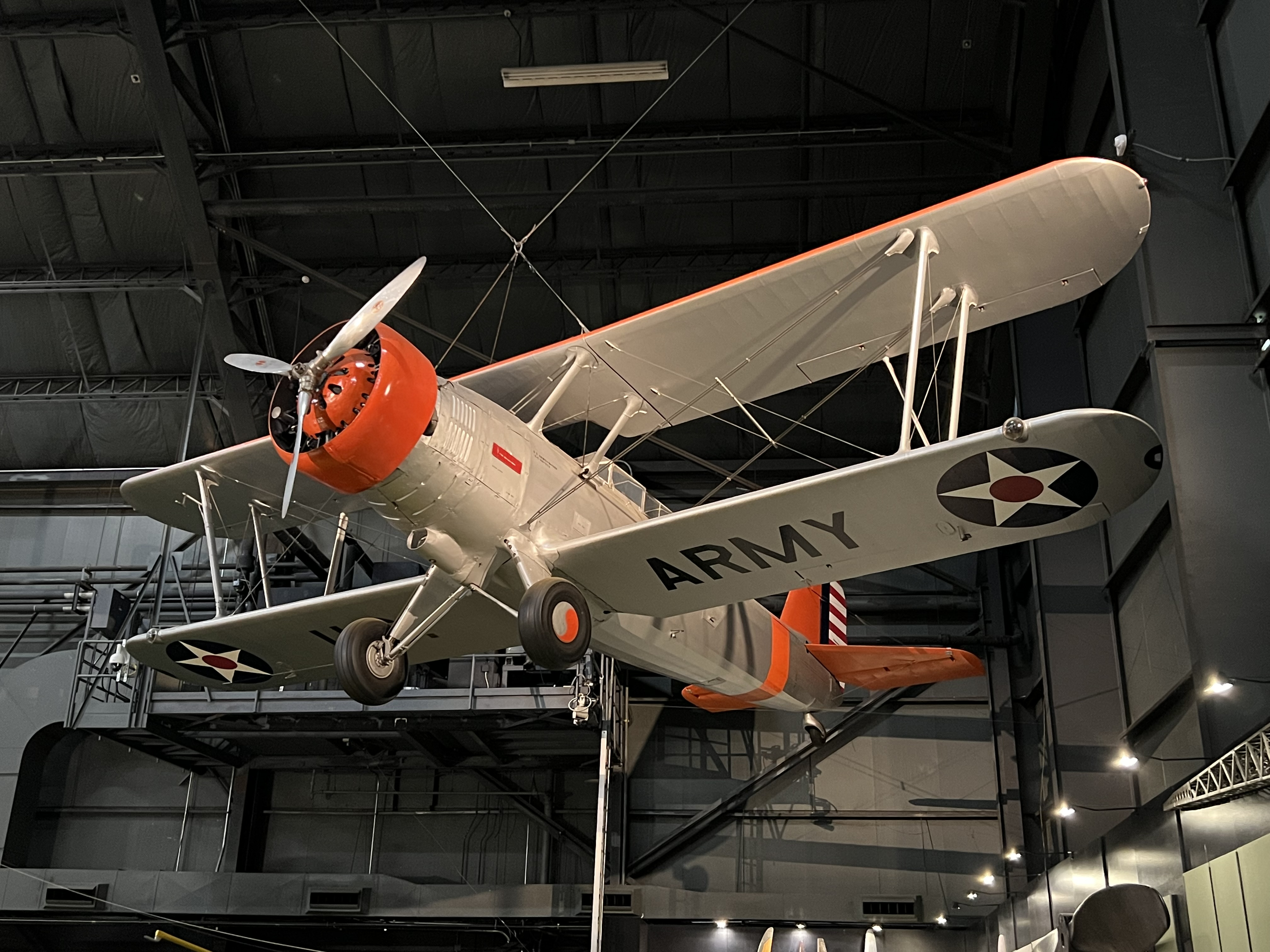
O-38F on display at the National Museum of the USAF

- The sole surviving example of an O-38 is on display at the National Museum of the United States Air Force at Wright-Patterson AFB near Dayton, Ohio. For several decades it was believed that no examples of this aircraft survived, until the wreckage of an O-38F was located in Alaska in the late 1960s. This aircraft was the first airplane to land at Ladd Field near Fairbanks, Alaska, in October 1940. It had gone down on 16 June 1941 as a result of engine failure, and made a soft landing in the Alaskan wilderness about 70 miles (110 km) southeast of Fairbanks. Both crewmen, pilot Lt. Milton H. Ashkins and mechanic Sgt. R. A. Roberts survived the landing unhurt, and hiked to safety after supplies were dropped to them, but the aircraft's location was considered too remote for it to be salvaged. The wreckage was eventually rediscovered nearly thirty years later during an aerial survey of the area, and the plane's type was soon identified. The staff of the Air Force Museum recognized it as the last surviving example, and quickly assembled a team to examine the aircraft for possible retrieval and restoration. Upon arriving at the crash site they found the aircraft surprisingly well preserved, with only the two seats and the tailwheel missing. The team was even able to light their campfires using the aircraft's remaining fuel. Plans were soon made to remove the aircraft by a CH-47 Chinook helicopter from Fort Greeley on 10 June 1968, and it was transported back to Dayton, Ohio.

== Specifications (O-38B) ==
Data from McDonnell Douglas aircraft since 1920 : Volume I, United States military aircraft since 1908

General characteristics

- Crew: 2
- Length: 31 ft 0 in (9.45 m)
- Wingspan: 40 ft 0 in (12.19 m)
- Height: 10 ft 8 in (3.25 m)
- Wing area: 362 sq ft (33.6 m^{2})
- Airfoil: Göttingen 398
- Empty weight: 3,070 lb (1,393 kg)
- Gross weight: 4,343 lb (1,970 kg)
- Max takeoff weight: 4,456 lb (2,021 kg)

Performance

- Maximum speed: 150 mph (240 km/h, 130 kn)
- Cruise speed: 120 mph (190 km/h, 100 kn)
- Range: 275 mi (443 km, 239 nmi)
- Service ceiling: 19,000 ft (5,800 m)
- Rate of climb: 1,500 ft/min (7.6 m/s)
- Wing loading: 12 lb/sq ft (59 kg/m^{2})
- Power/mass: 0.12 hp/lb (0.20 kW/kg)

Armament

- Guns: 2 × .30 in (7.62 mm) machine guns, one fixed forward-firing and one flexible
- Bombs: 4 × 100 lb (45 kg) bombs
