= Douglas O-2 =

Observation aircraft family by Douglas

O-2
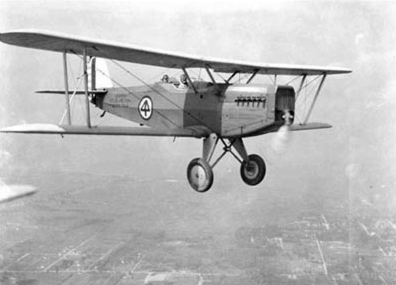

General information
- Type: Observation plane
- Manufacturer: Douglas Aircraft Company
- Primary user: United States Army Air Corps
- Number built: 879

History
- Manufactured: 1924
- Variants: Douglas O-38; Douglas XA-2; Douglas M-1

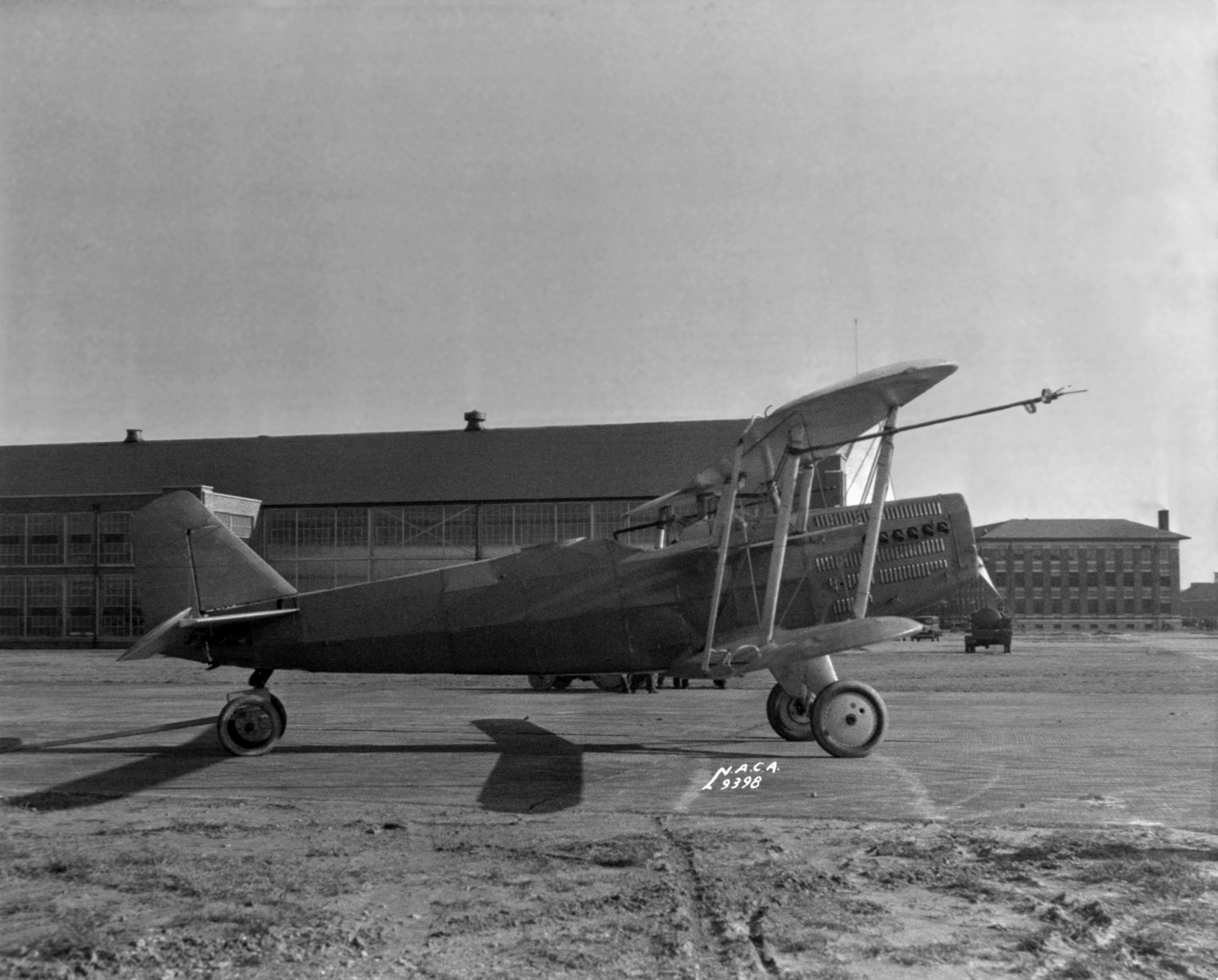
Douglas O-2H in 1934

The Douglas O-2 was a 1920s American observation aircraft built by the Douglas Aircraft Company, powered by the Liberty engine of WW1 fame, with some later variants using other engines. It was developed into several versions, with 879 being produced in total. It was used in combat by the Chinese Air Force in the 1930s and also was the basis for a successful mailplane version.

== Development ==
The important family of Douglas observation aircraft sprang from two XO-2 prototypes, the first of which was powered by the 420 hp (313 kW) Liberty V-1650-1 V-engine and test-flown in the autumn of 1924. The second XO-2 was powered by the 510 hp (380 kW) Packard 1A-1500 Vee engine, which proved unreliable. The US Army ordered 45 O-2 production aircraft in 1925, which retained the XO-2's welded steel tube fuselage, wooden wings, and overall fabric covering. It introduced aluminum panels on the forward fuselage. The XO-2 had been flown with short and long-span wings, the latter giving improved handling and therefore being specified for the production aircraft. The fixed tailskid landing gear included a main unit of the divided type, the horizontal tail surface was strut-braced, and the engine was cooled by a tunnel radiator.

The O-2 proved to be a conventional but very reliable biplane, which soon attracted orders for 25 more aircraft: 18 O-2A machines equipped for night flying and six O-2B dual-control command aircraft for the US Army, plus one civil O-2BS modified specially for James McKee, who made a remarkable trans-Canada flight in September 1926. In 1927, the O-2BS was adapted as a three-seater with a radial engine.

The O-2Hs were an entirely new design but continued the same basic model number. Major differences were heavily staggered wings, a more compact engine installation, and clean landing gear secured to the fuselage.

Douglas produced 879 of all variants, with 770 going to the U.S. military.

=== Survivors ===
Up to 2011, no O-2s had been known to exist. However, in 2011, the wreckage of O-2H 29-163 that crashed out of Kelly Field, Texas, on March 16, 1933 has been positively identified. The rear and central/forward portion of the fuselage behind the firewall, wing attachments and landing gear parts, tailplane, and many engine parts, as well as eight of the twelve pistons, have now been recovered. Research is continuing on this aircraft. It is known it was flown by Aviation Cadet Charles D. Rogers on a night recon advanced training mission. Apparently flying low, the aircraft hit a hill and burned after the crash, leaving only the found wreckage today. Weather was not considered a contributing factor. Cadet Rogers was instantly killed in the crash by the impact. His body was recovered, but the wreckage was abandoned due to the airframe and engine both being a write-off.

There is an M-2 on display at the Udvar-Hazy museum; the aircraft was used as a mail plane in the late 1920s before it crashed in January 1930, eventually being used as display aircraft since 1940.

The only similar aircraft known to exist is a restored Douglas M-2 mailplane and a follow-on derivative of the O-25 variant, an O-38.

== Operational history ==
=== Mail ===
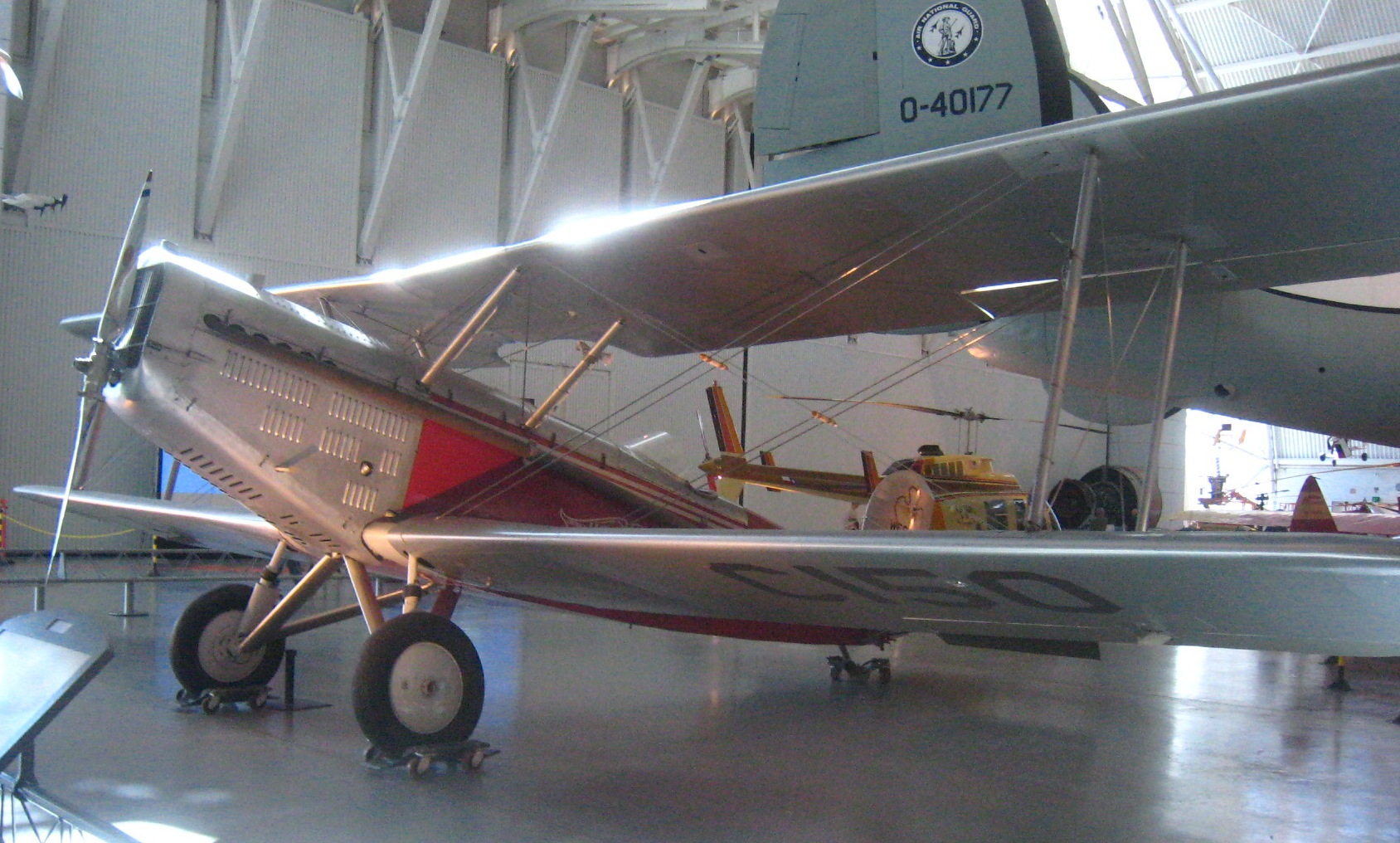
The M-2 mailplane version of O-2 in present day museum

Starting in 1926, a mailplane version of the O-2 called the M-2 entered service with Western replacing the DH-4. The plane was successful in the route, resulting in further development of the mailplane version of the O-2. (see Douglas mailplanes)

=== Military ===
Douglas O-2M variants were deployed by the Chinese Air Force's 6th, 7th, and 8th Bomber-Attack and Scouting-Attack Groups in combat against the Chinese Red Army during the encirclement campaigns of the Chinese Civil War and later against the Imperial Japanese forces during the early years of the Second Sino-Japanese War. O-2Ms (sometimes mislabeled as Douglas O-38s) were heavily deployed in the Battle of Shanghai, the Battle of Nanjing, and the Battle of Taiyuan. As their slow speed made the O-2Ms vulnerable to fast Japanese fighters, they either flew clandestine night missions solo or day missions escorted by Hawk IIs or Hawk IIIs. Japanese ace fighter pilot Akio Matsuba, flying an A2N from the aircraft carrier Kaga in his first aerial combat engagement, claimed his first (shared) victory over an O-2M while providing air cover for Japanese troop landings in Shanghai on the third day during the airwar of the War of Resistance/WWII, 16 August 1937.

== Variants ==
XO-2
Two pre-production prototypes.
O-2
Initial production model - 45 built.
O-2A
O-2 with night flying equipment - 18 built.
O-2B
Dual control version of O-2 - six built.
O-2C
These differed from the O-2 in having frontal radiators for their Liberty L-12 engines and modified oleo-strut landing gear. The USAAC took delivery of 18 aircraft, while the remaining 27 went to reserve National Guard units - 45 built and one later conversion from O-9.
O-2D
Unarmed staff transport versions of the O-2C - two built.
O-2E
A one-off aircraft which replaced the wire link between upper and lower wing ailerons of production aircraft by rigid struts.
O-2H
The fuselage was redesigned and a new tailplane was fitted, with staggered wings of unequal span. The O-2H incorporated the rigid-strut aileron interconnections of the O-2E. An improved split-axle landing gear was standard. The USAAC received 101 O-2Hs between 1928 and 1930, and the National Guard a further 40 - 141 built.
O-2J
Unarmed dual control version of the O-2H for service as USAAC staff transports - three built.
O-2K
A slightly modified version of the O-2J for US Army staff transport and liaison duties. 30 built for the USAAC and 20 for the National Guard - 50 built.
O-2M
various export versions of O-2 that saw services with Republic of China Air Force. These aircraft were used as scout-bombers by the Chinese in the Second Sino-Japanese War with some success against ground targets of the Empire of Japan. It was also used by the Mexican Air Force with Lewis and Vickers machine guns, with very good results.
O-2MC
Export version for China, powered by a Hornet radial engine - ten built
O-2MC-2
Export version for China, with the Hornet radial engine surrounded by a Townend ring - 20 built
O-2MC-3
Export version for China, fitted with an uprated 575 hp (429 kW) Pratt & Whitney Hornet radial engine - five built
O-2MC-4
Export version for China - 12 built
O-2MC-5
Export version for China, fitted with the less powerful 420 hp (310 kW) Pratt & Whitney Wasp C1 engine - 12 built
O-2MC-6
Export version for China, fitted with the 575 hp (429 kW) Wright R-1820-E radial engine - 22 built
O-2MC-10
Export version for China, fitted with a 670 hp (500 kW) Wright R-1820-F21 radial engine - one built
XO-6
Five all-metal O-2s, built in the mid-1920s by Thomas-Morse.
XO-6B
Radically altered (smaller and lighter) version of the XO-6 - one built.
O-7
Three O-2s refitted with the 510 hp (380 kW) Packard 2A-1500 direct-drive engine. Two were later converted to O-2 standards, and one to the O-2C standard.
O-8
One O-2 with the 400 hp (300 kW) Curtiss R-1454 radial engine instead of the intended Packard inverted-Vee engine. It later became an O-2A.
O-9
One O-2 refitted with the 500 hp (370 kW) Packard 3A-1500 geared engine. It resembled the O-7 but had a four- rather than two-bladed propeller. It later became an O-2A.
XO-14
One reduced-scale O-2H, with a 220 hp (160 kW) Wright J-5 engine, and the first Douglas aircraft with wheel brakes.
XA-2
The 46th aircraft of the original O-2 contract was completed as an attack machine with the powerplant of one 420 hp (310 kW) V-1410 Liberty inverted-Vee engine, and with a total of eight machine-guns (two in the engine cowling, two each in the upper and lower wings, and two on a ring-mounting operated by the observer). It was remarkably well armed for its day, and competed against the Curtiss A-3 in 1926 but was not selected for production.
OD-1
Two O-2Cs for service with the US Marine Corps from 1929.
O-22
O-2H airframe with a swept-back upper wing and a Pratt & Whitney Wasp engine.

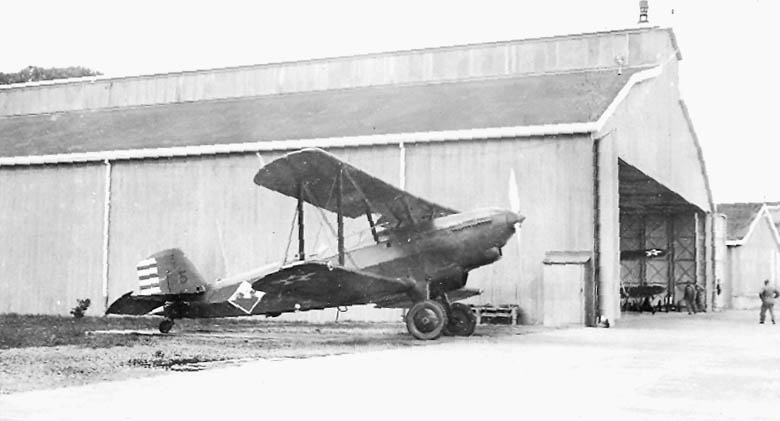
Douglas O-25, with its Curtiss Conqueror engine

O-25
O-2H airframe with a Curtiss Conqueror engine, and a revised nose. Later redesignated as the XO-25A
O-25A
Forty-nine production versions of the O-25.
O-25B
Three unarmed O-25As fitted with dual controls. Used as staff transport aircraft
O-25C
29 production O-25s with Prestone cooling system
Y1O-29
Later designated O-29A: Two O-2K airframes fitted with a Wright R-1750 Cyclone engine.
O-32
O-2K conversion with Pratt & Whitney R-1340-3 Wasp engine, most later fitted with anti-drag rings.
O-32A
Production O-32, 30 built.
YO-34
O-22 re-fitted with a Curtiss Conqueror engine.

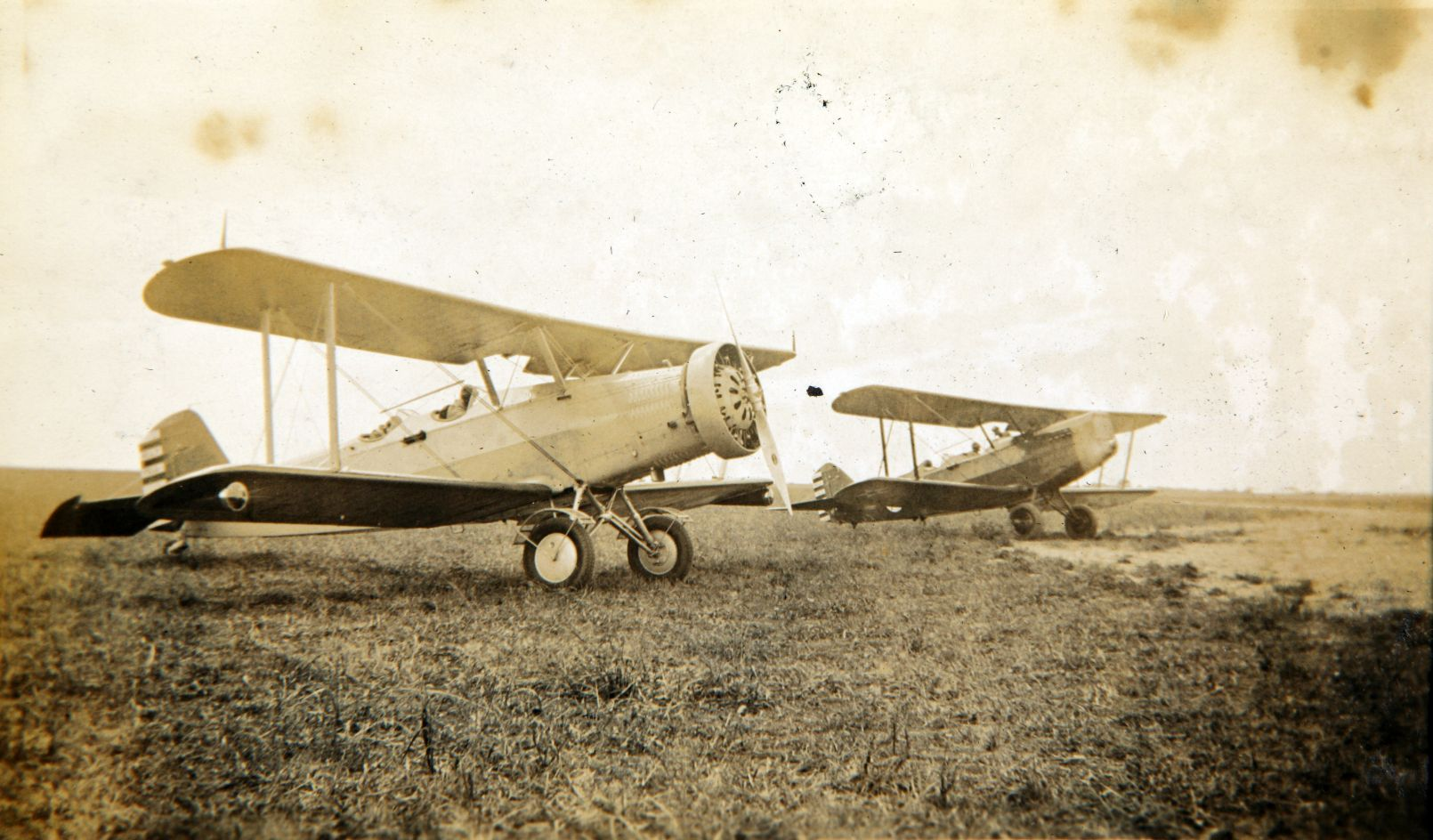
BT-2 (left) and BT-1 at Waco, Texas

BT-1
O-2K conversion to basic trainer, 30 converted.
BT-2
O-32 airframe converted to basic trainer.
BT-2A
O-32A conversion to basic trainer, 30 converted.
BT-2B
First production model, 146 built. 58 later converted to BT-2BI instrument trainers. Two converted to BT-2BR and 15 to BT-2BG radio-controlled aerial target drones.
BT-2C
Second production model, 20 built. 13 converted to BT-2CI instrument trainers. Seven became BT-2CR drone controllers.
A-4
Seventeen BT-2BRs and BT-2BGs converted in 1940 as radio-controlled aerial target drones. These had tricycle gear (a steerable nosewheel was added) with main gear moved aft, faired-over rear cockpit, and single controls, allowing the aircraft to be test-flown.

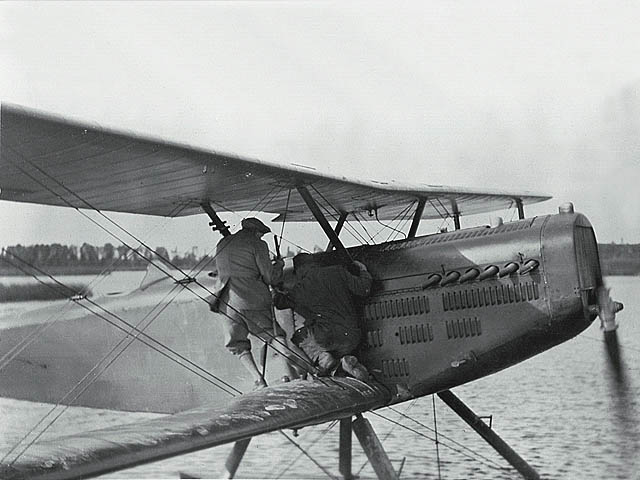
Douglas MO-2B

MO-2B
Three seat general purpose biplane derived from the M series of mail-planes, despite the O-2 designation

== Operators ==
China

- Chinese Nationalist Air Force

Mexico

- Mexican Air Force

United States

- United States Army Air Corps
- United States Marine Corps

== Specifications (O-2H) ==
Data from McDonnell Douglas aircraft since 1920 : Volume I

General characteristics

- Crew: 2
- Length: 30 ft 0 in (9.14 m)
- Wingspan: 40 ft 10 in (12.45 m)
- Height: 10 ft 0 in (3.05 m)
- Wing area: 362 sq ft (33.6 m^{2})
- Airfoil: Clark Y
- Empty weight: 2,857 lb (1,296 kg)
- Gross weight: 4,484 lb (2,034 kg)
- Max takeoff weight: 4,550 lb (2,064 kg)
- Fuel capacity: 110 US gal (92 imp gal; 420 L) in a single fuselage tank ahead of and below the pilot's cockpit
- Powerplant: 1 × Liberty V-1650-1 V-12 liquid-cooled piston engine, 435 hp (324 kW)
- Propellers: 2-bladed metal propeller

Performance

- Maximum speed: 134.5 mph (216.5 km/h, 116.9 kn) at sea level
- Cruise speed: 110 mph (180 km/h, 96 kn)
- Range: 512 mi (824 km, 445 nmi)
- Service ceiling: 16,900 ft (5,200 m)
- Rate of climb: 1,075 ft/min (5.46 m/s)
- Wing loading: 12.4 lb/sq ft (61 kg/m^{2})
- Power/mass: 0.0971 hp/lb (0.1596 kW/kg)

Armament

- 2 × .30 in (7.62 mm) Browning machine guns, one fixed forward-firing and one flexible
- 400 lb (181 kg) of disposable stores carried under the lower wing
