= Packard 1A-1500 =

1A-1500
- Packard 2A-1500, Inverted V-12 Engine
- Type: Liquid-cooled V12 piston engine
- Manufacturer: Packard
- First run: 1924
- Number built: 29
- Developed from: Packard 1A-1300
- Developed into: Packard 1A-2500

The Packard 1A-1500 was an American liquid-cooled 60-degree V12 piston aircraft engine designed in 1924. Test flown in the second prototype Douglas XO-2, it proved to be unreliable. Only 29 engines were built.

== Applications ==
- Boeing Model 15
- Boeing XP-4
- Curtiss Falcon
- Douglas XO-2
- Loening OL

== Specifications (1A-1500) ==
Data from STATISTICS OF ALL THE AERO ENGINES OF PACKARD

=== General characteristics ===
- Type: V12 liquid-cooled piston aircraft engine
- Bore: 5 3/8 in (136.5 mm)
- Stroke: 5 1/2 in (139.7 mm)
- Displacement: 1,498 in^{3} (24.5 L)
- Dry weight: 720 lb (326.5 kg)

=== Components ===
- Valvetrain: Four valves per cylinder, overhead camshaft
- Cooling system: Liquid-cooled

=== Performance ===
- Power output: 500 hp (370 kW) at 2,000 rpm maximum continuous;520 hp (390 kW) at 2,200 rpm for takeoff
- Specific power: 0.347 hp/cu in (15.8 kW/L)
- Power-to-weight ratio: 0.722 hp/lb (1.187 kW/kg)

== See also ==
- Packard 1A-2500

Comparable engines

- Curtiss D-12
- Fairey Prince (V-12)
- Rolls-Royce Kestrel

Related lists

- List of aircraft engines
