= Fairey P.12 Prince =

1930s British experimental aircraft piston engine

Prince P.12
- Type: Piston V12 aero-engine
- Manufacturer: Fairey Aviation Company Limited
- First run: 1933
- Major applications: Fairey Fox
- Number built: 3

The Fairey P.12 Prince was a British experimental 700 hp (520 kW) class V-12 aircraft engine designed and built by Fairey in the early 1930s. The engine did not go into production.

== Design and development ==
The Prince was a privately funded project designed by Captain A.G. Forsyth, who had joined the Fairey company in 1931 as their chief engine designer. The company had hoped to obtain Air Ministry orders for the engine but faced opposition, with the ministry favouring Bristol and Rolls-Royce engines instead.

Three prototypes were built in secrecy; with the engines running by 1933, a single Prince was installed and test flown in a Fairey Fox II biplane in 1934, but no orders materialised.

== Applications ==
- Fairey Fox

== Variants ==
- P.12 Prince I or Prince V-12

650 hp (485 kW) - Unsupercharged

- P.12 Prince II or Super Prince V-12S

720 hp (537 kW) projected - Fully supercharged

== Specifications (Prince I) ==
Data from Lumsden.

=== General characteristics ===
- Type: Liquid-cooled 60-degree V12 engine
- Bore: 5.25 in (133 mm)
- Stroke: 6 in (150 mm)
- Displacement: 1,558.62 in^{3} (25.54 L)

=== Components ===
- Cooling system: Liquid-cooled

=== Performance ===
- Power output: 670 hp (500 kW) at 2,500 rpm at 2,000 ft

== See also ==
Comparable engines

- Packard 1A-1500
- Rolls-Royce Kestrel

Related lists

- List of aircraft engines
