= Boeing F2B =

American fighter aircraft

F2B
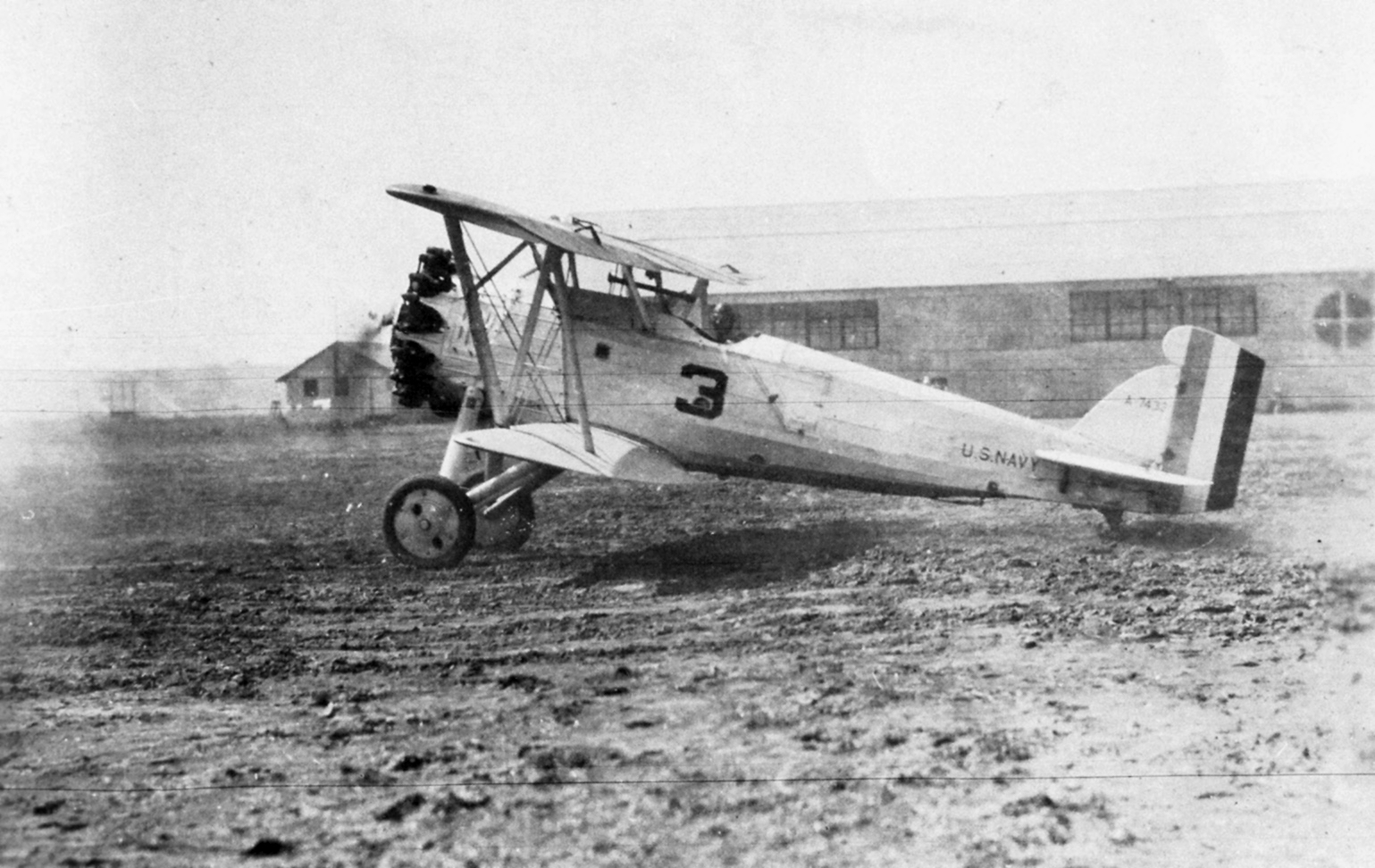
- Boeing F2B-1 (BuNo A7432)

General information
- Type: Carrier-based fighter
- National origin: United States
- Manufacturer: Boeing
- Primary users: United States Navy Brazilian Navy; Imperial Japanese Navy
- Number built: 32 plus 1 prototype

History
- Introduction date: 20 January 1928
- First flight: 3 November 1926
- Developed from: Boeing XP-8

The Boeing F2B was an American biplane fighter aircraft of the United States Navy in the 1920s, familiar to aviation enthusiasts of the era as the craft of the Three Sea Hawks aerobatic flying team, famous for its tied-together formation flying.

== Design and development ==
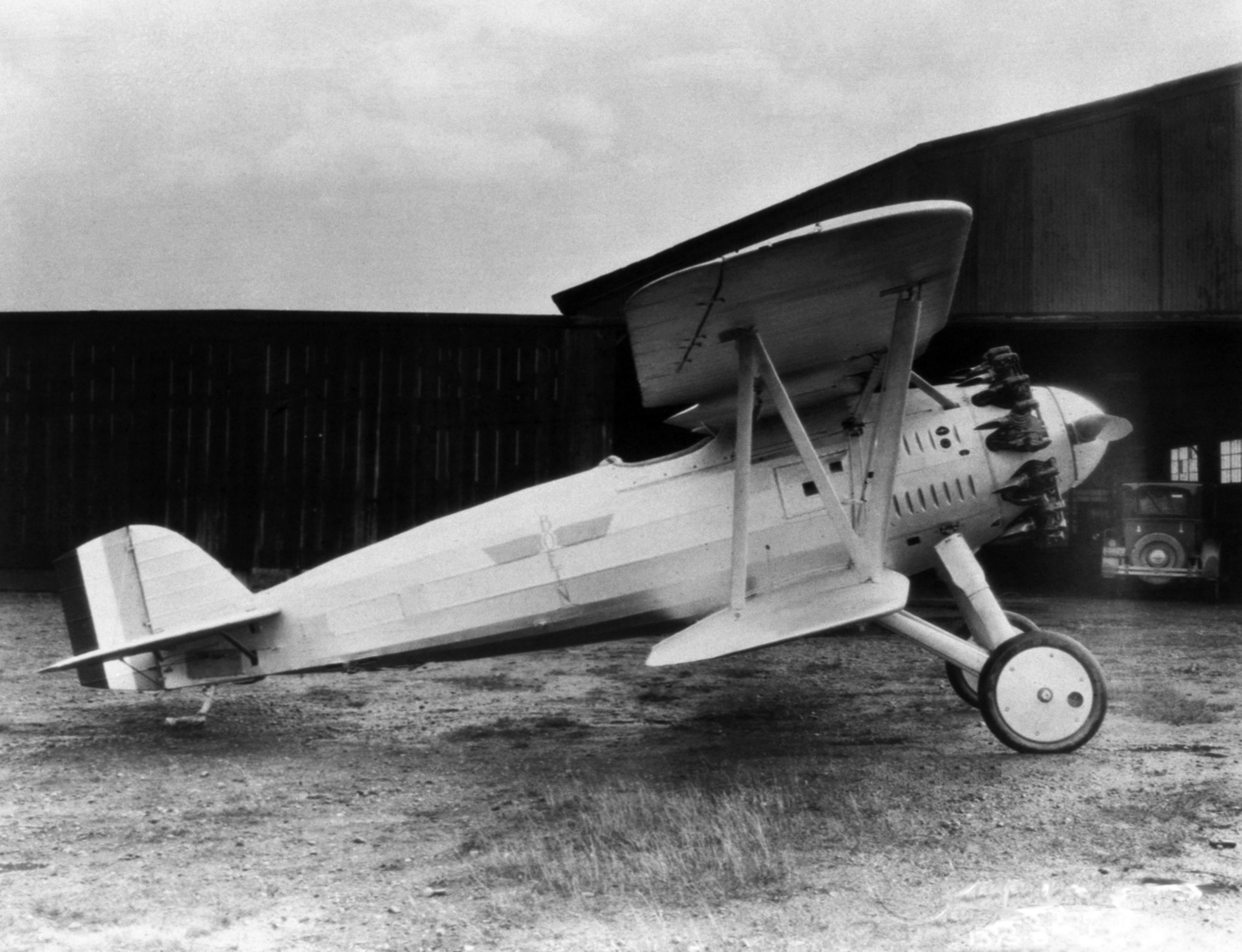
Boeing XF2B-1 (BuNo A7385)

Initially the Boeing Model 69, it was inspired by the results of tests on the FB-6, which was powered by a Pratt & Whitney R-1340B Wasp radial engine. Boeing set out to use this engine in a fighter designed specifically for carrier operations, using the same welded-tubing fuselage and wooden-frame wings as for the Model 15, and adding a large spinner to reduce air drag around the engine (this was dropped in production). Armament was either two .30 in (7.62 mm) machine guns, or one .30 in and one .50 in (12.7 mm); the lower wing had attachments for up to four 25 lb (11 kg) bombs, plus a fifth could be hung from the fuselage.

== Operational history ==
First flight of the F2B prototype was November 3, 1926. The Navy acquired the prototype as XF2B-1, which was capable of reaching speeds of 154 mph (248 km/h), and was sufficiently impressed to order 32 F2B-1s. In addition to omission of the large streamlined spinner cap, the production versions also had a balanced rudder. Delivery began on January 20, 1928, with some assigned to fighter squadron VF-1B and others to bomber squadron VF-2B, both operating from the carrier Saratoga. Although the Navy did not order any more F2Bs, Boeing built two more, as Model 69Bs, exporting one to Brazil and the other to Japan.

=== U.S. Navy flight demonstration team ===
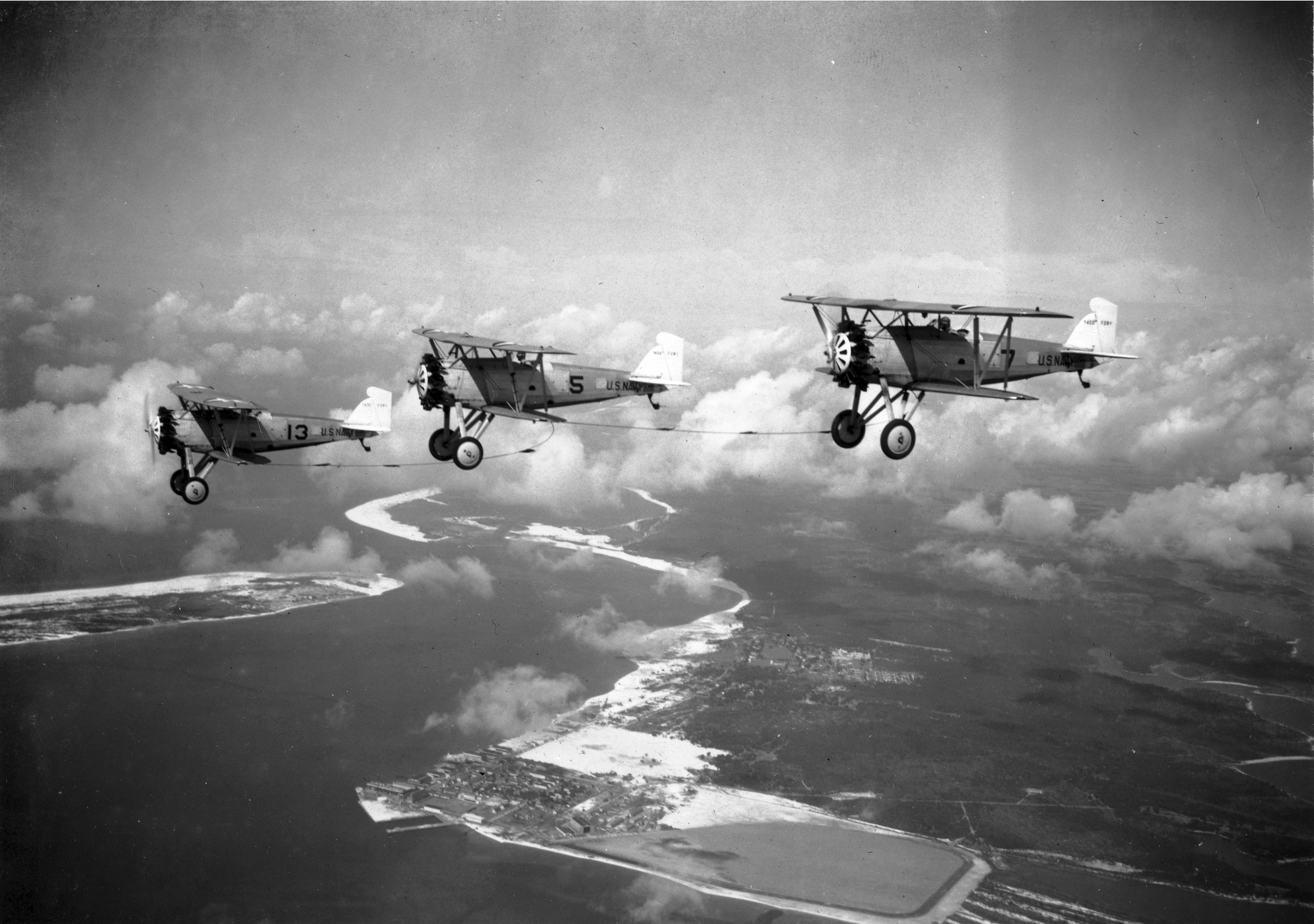
Three U.S. Navy Boeing F2B-1 fighters that made up the 1928 U.S. Navy aerobatics team called The Three Seahawks

In 1927, Lieutenant D. W. "Tommy" Tomlinson, commanding officer of U.S. Navy squadron VF-2B, created the first U.S. Navy aerobatic team. Drawing from squadron VB-2B at Naval Air Station North Island, San Diego, California, the team used three Boeing F2B-1 fighters. Its first unofficial demonstration in January 1928 at San Francisco, California, gave rise to the popular nickname "Suicide Trio," although officially the team was called "Three Sea Hawks." The first public performance as an official team representing the U.S. Navy was between September 8 and 16, during National Air Races week at Mines Field (now Los Angeles International Airport) in Los Angeles, California. The Boeing F2B-1 could not fly inverted without the engine quitting; consequently, Tomlinson modified the carburetors to permit brief inverted flight. At the end of 1929, the Three Sea Hawks team disbanded when its VB-2B pilots were reassigned.

== Variants ==
XF2B-1
(Model 69) One prototype serial number A7385
F2B-1
(Model 69) Single-seat fighter biplane for the U.S. Navy, serial numbers A7424 to A7455
Model 69B
Two aircraft, generally similar to the F2B-1, one each to Brazil and Japan.
Model 76
F2B-1 modified with metal wings and rod aileron control.

== Operators ==
Brazil

- Brazilian Naval Aviation

Japan

- Imperial Japanese Navy Air Service

United States

- United States Navy

== Specifications (F2B-1) ==
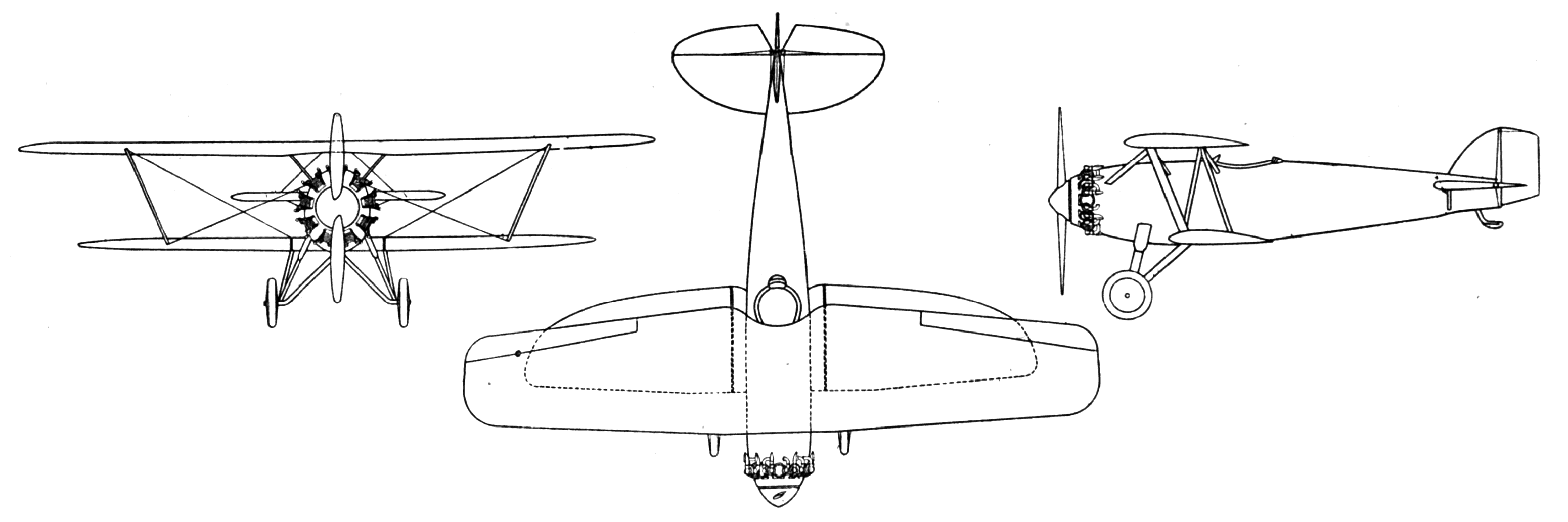
Boeing F2B-1 3-view drawing from L'Aéronautique October,1927

Data from "The Complete Encyclopedia of World Aircraft"

General characteristics

- Crew: 1
- Length: 22 ft 11 in (6.98 m)
- Wingspan: 30 ft 1 in (9.17 m)
- Height: 9 ft 2.25 in (2.81 m)
- Wing area: 243 sq ft (22.57 m^{2})
- Empty weight: 1,989 lb (902 kg)
- Max takeoff weight: 2,805 lb (1,272 kg)
- Powerplant: 1 × Pratt & Whitney R-1340-8 Wasp Radial, 425 hp (317 kW)

Performance

- Maximum speed: 158 mph (254 km/h, 137 kn)
- Cruise speed: 132 mph (212 km/h, 115 kn)
- Range: 315 mi (507 km, 274 nmi)
- Service ceiling: 21,500 ft (6,555 m)
- Rate of climb: 1,890 ft/min (9.6 m/s)

Armament

- Guns: 1 × .50 in (12.7 mm) Browning M1921E1 and 1 × .30 in (7.62 mm) forward firing Browning M1918 machine guns or 2 × 0.30 in machine guns in the forward fuselage
- Bombs: 5 × 25 lb (11 kg) bombs carried under the fuselage and lower wing

== See also ==
Related development

- Boeing XP-8

Related lists

- List of military aircraft of the United States
- List of fighter aircraft
