= Boeing Model 15 =

American fighter aircraft

PW-9/FB
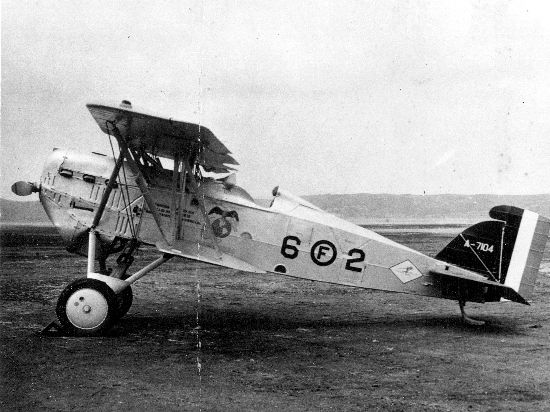
- USMC Naval variant, Boeing FB-5 of VM-3M VMFA-232

General information
- Type: Pursuit fighter (PW-9); Carrier Fighter (FB series)
- Manufacturer: Boeing
- Primary users: United States Army Air Service United States Navy; United States Marine Corps
- Number built: 158

History
- Introduction date: 1923
- First flight: 2 June 1923
- Variant: Boeing XP-4

The Boeing Model 15 is a United States single-seat open-cockpit biplane fighter aircraft of the 1920s, manufactured by the Boeing company. The Model 15 saw service with the United States Army Air Service (as the PW-9 series) and with the United States Navy as a carrier-based fighter (as the FB series).

== Design and development ==
The design of the Model 15 was based on studies of the Fokker D.VII, of which 142 were brought back to the U.S. for evaluation as part of the Armistice Agreement ending World War I. Many of the features were similar. The Model 15 had a fuselage of welded steel tubing braced with piano wire, while the tapered single bay wings were fabric on a wooden frame, with spruce and mahogany wing spars and three-ply wood ribs. Wing struts were changed from the normal wood used in Boeing designs to streamlined steel tubes. The landing gear had a straight axle, streamlined into a small 16 in (410 mm) chord wing.

The original engine was a 300 hp (220 kW) Wright-Hispano, but when the 435 hp (324 kW) liquid-cooled Curtiss D-12 became available the aircraft was redesigned, moving the radiator from the nose to a "tunnel" under the engine. Along with some other minor design changes to the wings, the design was finalized on January 10, 1922.

The Army expressed interest in the new design, and agreed to provide armament, powerplants, and test the aircraft, while leaving Boeing the rights to the aircraft and design. The contract was signed on April 4, 1923 and the first prototype, designated XPW-9 for "Experimental Pursuit, Water-cooled engine", flew on June 2, 1923. The XPW-9 competed with the Curtiss Model 33 for contracts for a pursuit aircraft to replace the Thomas-Morse MB-3A in the United States Army Air Service.

Ultimately, both models were accepted; the Curtiss aircraft was designated PW-8 and the Model 15 PW-9. The Air Service preferred the PW-9, which outperformed the PW-8 in all performance aspects except speed, and was built on a more rugged and easier to maintain design, ordering 113 aircraft (only 25 PW-8s were procured). A naval version was also developed, designated FB, and 44 aircraft produced.

== Operational history ==
Deliveries of the first 25 PW-9s began on October 30, 1925. Boeing delivered a total of 114 PW-9s of all variants including prototypes to the United States Army Air Corps between 1925 and February 1931. Virtually all PW-9s served with overseas units, in Hawaii with the 5th Composite Group at Luke Field and later the 18th Pursuit Group at Wheeler Field, and in the Philippines with the 4th Composite Group at Clark Field, Luzon. PW-9s equipped the 3rd, 6th, and 19th Pursuit Squadrons between 1925 and 1931.

The FB-1, of which the Navy ordered 16 but received only ten between December 1 and 22, 1924, was not modified for naval operations (for instance, no arresting hook), and was assigned to Marine Corps squadrons VF-1M, VF-2M, and VF-3M, being deployed to China in support of the Marine Expeditionary Force. Two additional planes—designated FB-2—were altered to operate on the carrier Langley with the addition of arresting gear and a straight-across axle for the landing gear. These went into service with VF-2 in December 1925. Generally satisfactory results led to an order for 27 FB-5s, which became the Navy's first fighters intended specifically for carrier operation. They were upgraded to 525 hp (391 kW) Packard 2A-1500 engines, and sported a row of hooks on the bottom of the axle, used to guide the plane via cables on the deck. The FB-5 first flew October 7, 1926 and was delivered to the Navy beginning in the following January, carried on barges in Puget Sound from Boeing's factory to Langley anchored in Seattle's harbor. Hoisted aboard, their first official flights were from the carrier's deck.

== Production history ==
Of the 158 aircraft built, 147 were standard production aircraft and the remaining were aircraft developed for specific interests.

The production runs are shown below with the PW designations for Army aircraft and the FB designations being for the Navy.

| Number Built | Model | Years Built | Engine |
|---|---|---|---|
| 30 | PW-9 | 1925-1926 | Curtiss D-12 |
| 24 | PW-9A | 1926-1927 | Curtiss D-12C |
| 40 | PW-9C | 1927-1928 | Curtiss D-12D |
| 16 | PW-9D | 1928-1934 | Curtiss D-12D |
| 10 | FB-1 | 1924 | Curtiss D-12 |
| 27 | FB-5 | 1927- | Packard 2A-1500 |

== Variants ==
XPW-9
Three prototypes built for Air Service evaluation. First aircraft scrapped at McCook Field on February 21, 1925, second static tested in October 1928 and the third was still flying in December 1928.

PW-9
30 produced 1925-26, first production variant, D-12 engine.

PW-9A
24 produced 1926-27, D-12C engine.

PW-9B
One modified PW-9A, delivered as PW-9B in 1927.

PW-9C
40 produced 1927-28, D-12D engine.

PW-9D
16 produced 1928-34, final production variant.

XP-4
Designation of one PW-9 (ser no. 25-324) re-engined with a 510 hp (380 kW) Packard 1A-1500 engine. Boeing Model 58.

AT-3
Designation of one PW-9A (ser no. 26-374) converted to single-seat trainer with a Wright-Hispano engine.

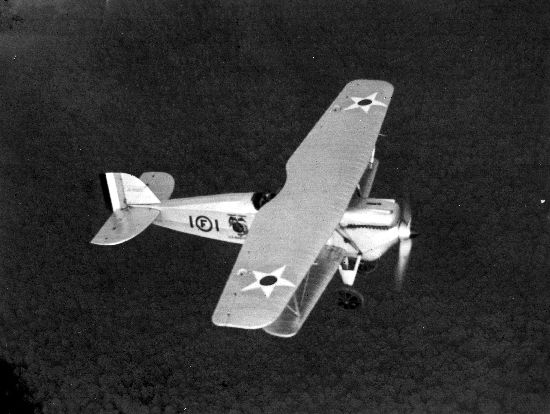
FB-1

FB-1
Ten built as FB-1s from initial order of 16, remaining six modified to other sub-types (FB-2, FB-3, FB-4). Powered by a 435 hp (324 kW) Curtiss D-12. Initial Navy delivery, shore-based only.

FB-2 (Model 53)
Two FB-1s modified for carrier operation, 510 hp (380 kW) Packard 1A-1500 engine. Later converted to FB-1 standard.

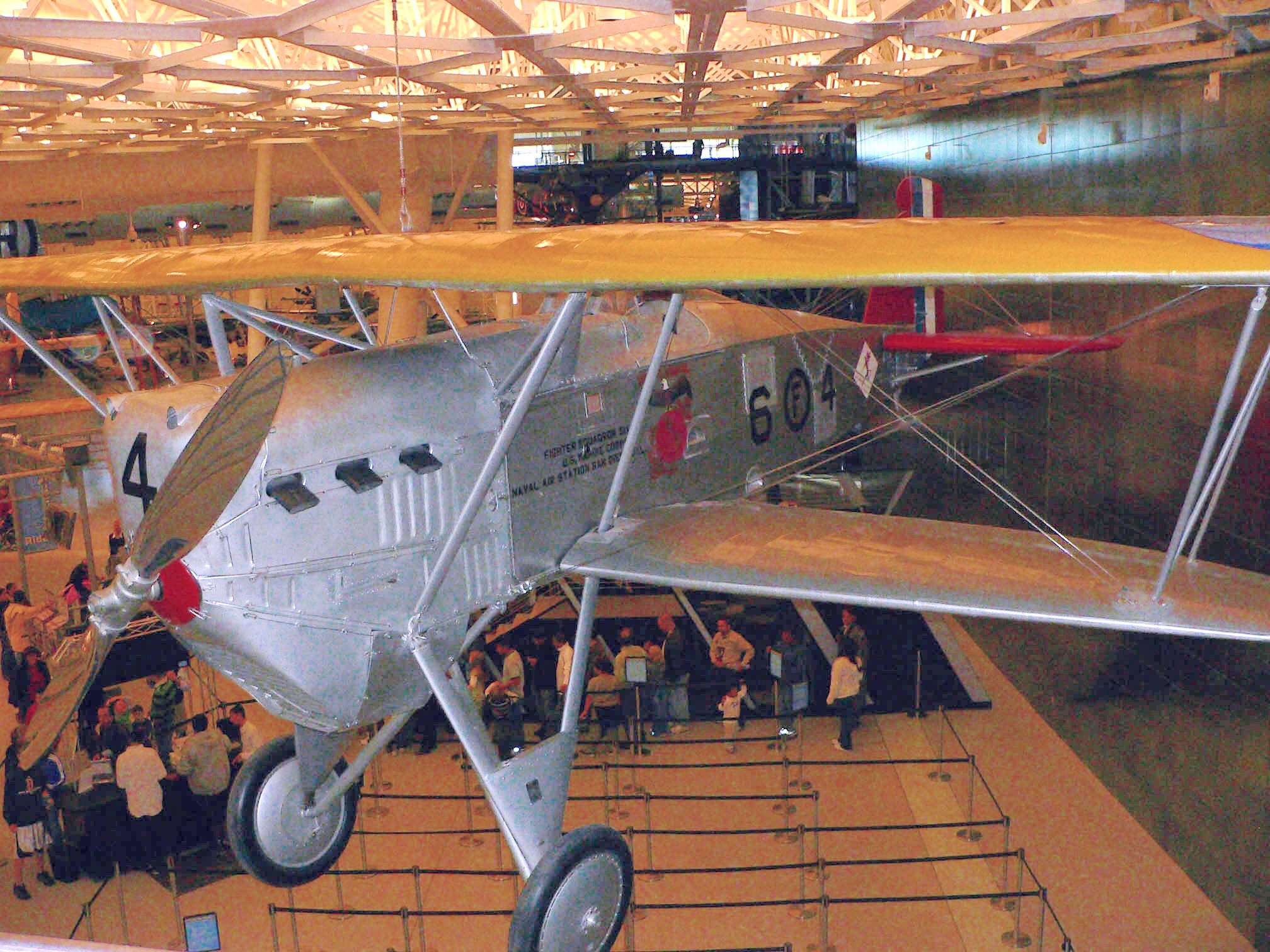
A Boeing FB-5 preserved at the Steven F. Udvar-Hazy Center.

FB-3 (Model 55)
Three built to evaluate the 510 hp (380 kW) Packard 1A-1500 engine. Like the FB-4, the FB-3 was fitted with floatplanes. Following a crash in December 1925, the remaining two were converted to conventional landing gear.

FB-4 (Model 54)
One built, experimental model with a 450 hp (340 kW) Wright P-1 radial engine and fitted with floatplanes. Later converted to FB-6 standard.

FB-5 (Model 67)
27 built, production version. Powered by a 520 hp (390 kW) Packard 2A-1500 engine.

FB-6
FB-4 re-engined with a 450 hp (340 kW) Pratt & Whitney R-1340-B Wasp engine.

FB-7 (Model 67A)
Development of FB-5, powered by a Pratt & Whitney R-1340-A Wasp engine, not built.

XFB-5 (Model 97)
Designation for one FB-5 (A-7101) used for development tests in 1927.

== Operators ==
United States

- United States Army Air Corps
- United States Navy
- United States Marine Corps

== Aircraft on Display ==
FB-5

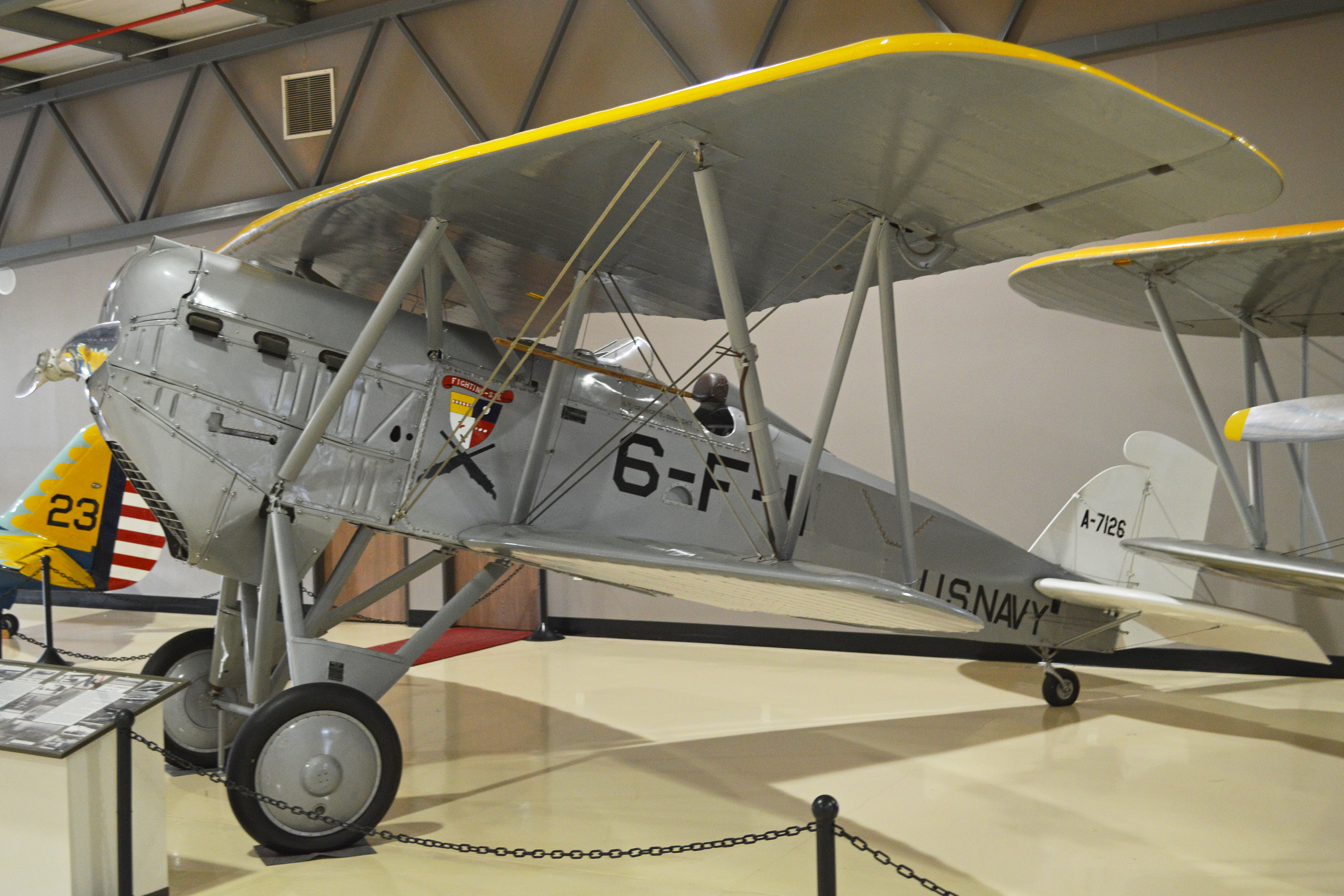
FB-5 on display at Planes of Fame Air Museum

- A-7114 on display at the Steven F. Udvar-Hazy Center, Dulles International Airport, Chantilly, Virginia.

- A-7123 in storage at the National Museum of the Marine Corps, Quantico, Virginia.

- A-7126 on display at Planes of Fame Air Museum, Chino, California.

- Reproduction on display at San Diego Air and Space Museum Gillespie Field Annex, El Cajon, California.

== Specifications (PW-9) ==
Data from Boeing Aircraft since 1916

General characteristics

- Crew: one
- Length: 23 ft 5 in (7.14 m)
- Wingspan: 32 ft (9.8 m)
- Height: 8 ft 2 in (2.49 m)
- Wing area: 260 sq ft (24 m^{2})
- Airfoil: Göttingen 436
- Empty weight: 1,936 lb (878 kg)
- Gross weight: 3,120 lb (1,415 kg)
- Powerplant: 1 × Curtiss D-12 water-cooled V-12, 435 hp (324 kW)

Performance

- Maximum speed: 159 mph (256 km/h, 138 kn)
- Cruise speed: 142 mph (229 km/h, 123 kn)
- Range: 390 mi (630 km, 340 nmi)
- Service ceiling: 18,925 ft (5,768 m)
- Rate of climb: 1,630 ft/min (8.3 m/s)
- Wing loading: 12.0 lb/sq ft (58.7 kg/m^{2})
- Power/mass: 0.14 hp/lb (0.22 kW/kg)

Armament

- Guns: 2 × fixed .30 in (7.62 mm) machine guns
- Bombs: 1 × 244 lb (111 kg) bomb

== See also ==
Related development

- Boeing XP-8
- Boeing F2B

Aircraft of comparable role, configuration, and era

- Curtiss P-1
- Fokker PW-7
