= August Raspet =

American aerodynamicist and researcher

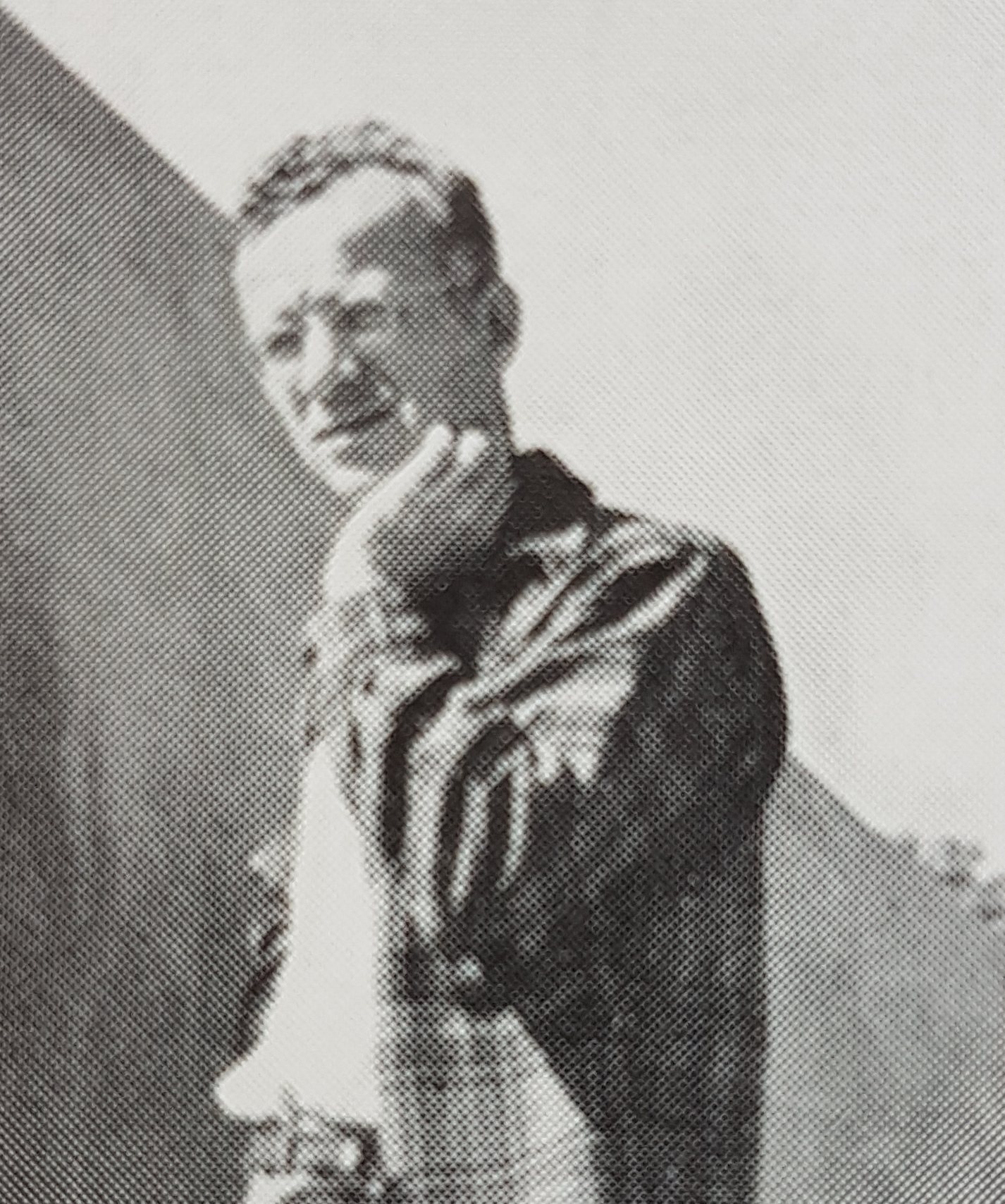
Dr. August "Gus" Raspet

August Raspet (24 August 1913 – 27 April 1960) was an American aerodynamicist and researcher. He was one of the most influential contributors to the science of aeronautics, dealing primarily with efficiency in flight, aerodynamics and wing design structures. His contributions to the field of flight science are many, having published over forty scholarly articles on subjects ranging from human muscle-powered flight to sailplane performance analysis as it relates to airplanes. An avid bird watcher, Raspet developed his dedication to the idea of flight from a young age and would use ideas generated from observing avian flight in his experiments and research throughout his career.

== Biography ==
Raspet was born in Irwin, Pennsylvania on 24 August 1913. He received a BS degree in Physics in 1935 and began working in the Civil Service as a junior physicist. In 1938 he began graduate studies at the University of Maryland while still working in the Civil Service. He received an MS degree in Physics in 1940 and PhD in 1942. His PhD dissertation covered instruments for measuring Earth's magnetic fields. In 1942 he began as a research physicist for the Gould Aeronautical Division of Pratt Read and Co. in Deep River, Connecticut. In 1943 he became a research physicist at Specialties, Inc. in Syosset, New York. While at Specialties, Inc. he became the Director of Research of the Soaring Society of America (The August 1960 edition of its monthly magazine is entirely dedicated to Raspet) for the glider phase of Project Thunderstorm. In 1947 Raspet became President and Director of Research at the Aerophysic Institute, Inc. for their study of airflow over an extended ridge, funded by the US Office of Naval Research. In 1949 Raspet became the Sailplane Projects Leader for the Engineering Station at Mississippi State College. From 1953 until his untimely death in 1960, he served as Head of the Aerophysics Department at Mississippi State College (now Mississippi State University). The Flight Research Laboratory at MSU is named for him.

On 27 April 1960, Raspet was involved in a plane crash during a demonstration of a Piper Cub with boundary layer modifications at Starkville, Mississippi's George M. Bryan Airport. He died at the scene and was survived by his wife and three children.

== Contributions ==
Raspet's most extensive work in aeronautics was in boundary layer control. Through several experiments involving laminar friction curve and high-lift boundaries, he made several breakthroughs regarding sailplanes that would later be incorporated in light aircraft.

=== Notable articles ===
- "More Audio Watts from a Single Type 10: An Audio System Adapted Modulater Use" – QST, March 1935 (co-author)
- "Prone Pilots" – Air Progress, 1940
- "Dynamic Balancing of Small Rotors by Means of the Cathode-ray Oscillograph" – Dumont Oscillographer, April–May 1941. (prize paper, co-author)
- "Slope Soaring" – Soaring – July–August 1943
- "Comments on Richard C. DuPont's Paper" – Soaring, July–August 1943
- "Glider-Tug Performance Studies" – Soaring, November–December 1944
- "The Angle of Attack Indicator" – Soaring, May–June 1946
- "Determination of the Flight Path of Airplanes, 1946" – Proceedings of Flight Path Conference, US Navy, 1946
- "Sailplane Performance Evaluation" – Soaring May–June 1947
- "The Ultimate Performance Sailplane" – Institute of Aeronautical Sciences, July 1948
- "The Sailplane as a Meteorological Probe" – Transactions: American Geophysics Union, October 1948
- "The Air Flow Over an Extended Ridge" – OSTIV, Pub. 1, 1948
- "Measurements of the Drag Coefficient of Soaring Bird" – Aeronautical Engineering Review, December 1950
- "Flight Characteristics of the Flat Top TG-4A" – Soaring, January–February 1950
- "Die Segelflugprojeckte des Miss. State College" – Thermik, March 1950
- "To Paul Tuntland (In Memoriam)" – Soaring, September–October 1950
- "Aerodynamics of the Sailplane Tiny Mite" – Soaring, November–December 1950
- "Performance Measurements of a Soaring Bird" – Aeronautical Engineering Review, Vol. 9, No. 12, December 1950
- "Problems of Cosmical Aerodynamics, a Review of Proceedings for CADA" – Aeronautical Engineering Review, 1951
- "The Sailplane in Aerodynamic Research" – Research Reviews, February 1952
- "Peravia Barograph" – Soaring, March–April 1951 (co-author)
- "Unsolved – The Problem of Leonardo da Vinci, Human Muscle-Powered Flight" – Journal of the Miss. Academy of Science, Vol. V, 1951–1953, as well as Soaring, May–June 1952
- "The Role of the Sailplane in Aerodynamic Research" – Soaring, May–June 1951
- "Boundary Layer Studies on a Sailplane" – Aeronautical Engineering Review, Vol. II, No. 6, June 1052
- "Systematic Improvement of the Drag Polar of the Sailplane RJ-5" – Soaring, September–October 1951
- "The Sailplane in Research, Training and Sport Flying" – Soaring, January–February 1953
- "Leisteungssteigerung von Segelflugzeugen durch die Berucksichtigung der Grenzschichtforschung (Increase in Performance of Sailplanes by Use of Boundary Layer Research), Translated by Nils Hirth and Edited by Wolf Hirth" – Handbook Des Segelfliegens, 1953
- "More Power or Less Drag" – Flight, April 1953
- "Bathtub Aerodynamics" – Soaring, May 1953 & March–April 1954 (co-author)
- "Control of the Boundary Layer on Sailplanes" – OSTIV, Pub. II
- "Flight Measurements of Trailing-Edge Suction on a Sailplane" – Aeronautical Engineering Review, Vol. 13, No. 1, January 1954
- "Private and Utility Airplane of the Future" – Aviation Age, January 1954
- "Flight Research on a Personal Type Airplane" – Research Reviews, April 1954
- "Application of Sailplane Performance Analysis to Airplanes" – Aeronautical Engineering Review, August 1954
- "Low Drag Sailplane, Tiny Mite, Modifications, 1954" – Journal of Aeronautical Society of India, Vol. 7, No. 3 & Soaring, November–December 1954 (co-author)
- "Sailplane as a Tool for Boundary Layer Research" – Fifty Years of Boundary Layer Research, 1955
- "Delay of the Stall by Suction Through Distributed Perforations" – Aeronautical Engineering Review, August 1956 (co-author)
- "Flight Measured Aerodynamics of Wittman's Tailwind" – Experimenter, October 1956, Experimental Aircraft Association
- "Basic Research and Mississippi's Industrialization" – Paper presented at the Mississippi Academy of Science Meeting, Mississippi State University, 24 April 1959
- "Some Thoughts on New Approaches to Soaring" – Presented at the Soaring Society of America technical Symposium, Los Angeles, California on 12 September 1959; published in Soaring November 1959

== The Dr. August Raspet Memorial Award ==
Because of Raspet's contribution to aeronautical science, a prestigious award has been named in his memory. The Experimental Aircraft Association (EAA), beginning in 1960, has awarded yearly the Dr. August Raspet Memorial Award to a person or group who has made significant advancements in the field of light aircraft design. "The first recipient of the award was John Thorp, Lockheed engineer on the Little Dipper and Big Dipper, and designer of the Thorp Aviation Sky Skooter. Since then the list of people honored reads like a Who's Who of aircraft design."

=== List of Recipients ===
- 1960 – John Thorp
- 1961 – Steve Wittman
- 1962 – Ray Stits
- 1963 – Alexander Lippisch
- 1964 – Richard Schreder
- 1965 – (no recipient)
- 1966 – Edgar J. Lesher
- 1967 – (no recipient)
- 1968 – Peter M. Bowers
- 1969 – Curtis Pitts
- 1970 – Ladislao Pazmany
- 1971 – Jim Bede
- 1972 – Bernard Pietenpol
- 1973 – Robert Bushby
- 1974 – Paul Poberezny
- 1975 – M.B. "Molt" Taylor
- 1976 – Burt Rutan
- 1977 – Lou Stolp
- 1978 – Chris Heintz
- 1979 – John Monnett
- 1980 – Dick VanGrunsven
- 1981 – Atonio "Tony" Bingelis
- 1982 – Dick Wagner
- 1983 – Mike Smith
- 1984 – B.J. Schramm
- 1985 – Tom Hamilton
- 1986 – Mark D. Brown
- 1987 – Lance Neibauer
- 1988 – Homer Kolb
- 1989 – Jim Griswold
- 1990 – John Roncz
- 1991 – Dan Denney
- 1992 – Alan and Dale Klapmeier
- 1993 – CAFE Foundation
- 1994 – Paul Fiduccia
- 1995 – Ivan Shaw
- 1996 – Stoddard-Hamilton GlaStar Design Team
- 1997 – Jim Rahm and Al Joniec
- 1998 – Dan Wilson
- 1999 – RotorWay International
- 2000 – Rotary Air Force
- 2001 – Harry Riblett
- 2002 – Randy Schlitter
- 2003 – Pete Buck
- 2004 – Phil Lockwood
- 2005 – Chuck Bilbe and Jim Younkin
- 2006 – Gordon Pratt and Ricardo Price / Chelton Flight Systems
- 2007 – Greg Toman
- 2008 – Randall Fishman
- 2009 – Rodney Stiff
- 2010 – Ken Krueger
- 2011 – James Wiebe
- 2012 – Michael Coates
- 2013 – BRP Rotax Engines
- 2014 – Troy Woodland
- 2015 – John and Jeremy Monnett
- 2016 – Paulo H. Iscold
- 2017 – Craig Catto
- 2018 – Greg Cole
- 2019 – Marcus Leng
- 2020 – (no recipient, AirVenture canceled)
- 2021 – Jim Rust
- 2022 – Garmin
- 2023 – Ivo Boscarol and Pipistrel
- 2024 – Mike Blyth and Sling Aircraft
- 2025 – Alberto Porto and Porto Aviation Group
