= Mrowka =

Mrowka is a Polish surname. Notable people with the surname include:

- Cole Mrowka (born 2006), Filipino footballer
- Tomasz Mrowka (born 1961), American politician
- PZL-126 Mrówka, Polish agricultural aircraft
