= C. B. Colby =

American writer

- Born: Carroll Burleigh Colby; September 7, 1904; Claremont, New Hampshire, US
- Died: October 31, 1977 (aged 73); Westchester County, New York
- Occupation: Writer
- Writing career
- Genres: Nonfiction mainly: military history, children's books, paranormal

Carroll Burleigh Colby (September 7, 1904 – October 31, 1977) was an American writer, primarily of nonfiction children's books. He wrote more than 100 books that were widely circulated in public and school libraries in the United States. He is best known for Strangely Enough! (1959).

== Biography ==
=== Early life ===
Colby was born in Claremont, New Hampshire, graduated from Stevens High School in 1922, and then attended the School of Practical Art in Boston, where he graduated in 1925.

He sailed to Puerto Rico with the intention of being a free-lance artist, but his failure led him to join the U.S. Customs Service during the Prohibition era. He married Lila Thoday in November 1928, having two children, Fred and Susan M. Colby.

=== Writing career ===
Colby sold his first fiction story in 1929.

Learning to fly glider aircraft in 1931, Colby began writing and illustrating articles for various aviation magazines, becoming an editor of Air Trails and Air Progress magazines that were Street & Smith publications. He co-authored the Junior Birdmen Standard Aviation Dictionary for the Junior Birdmen of America. In 1943 he became aviation editor of Popular Science magazine and became a war correspondent with the U.S. Army Air Forces in Newfoundland, Labrador, and Alaska. He left the magazine in 1946 to free-lance articles. Colby enlisted and served as an officer with the Civil Air Patrol.

Colby's first book was early in 1951 as by "Carroll Colby": Gabbit, the Magic Rabbit, a self-illustrated picture book about a magician's rabbit who turns the tables. (Note: In March 1951 Chicago department store Marshall Field's listed Gabbit, the magic rabbit at $1.50, among numerous books promoted "for children of all ages and interests ... ideal for your Easter gift of lasting joy". • "Our Easter bunny's a bookworm". Chicago Tribune. March 18, 1951, p. 29. In May publisher Coward-McCann advertised "Gabbit": The Magic Rabbit by Carroll Colby, for ages 4 to 7, $1.50, with a thumbnail illustration of a rabbit in a hat and the blurb: "Rabbits and magic go together, but now the tables are turned as Gabbit takes things into his own hands—to the amazement of the nice magician and the delight of boys and girls. • "For Boys and Girls from Coward-McCann". New York Herald Tribune. May 13, 1951, p. E24. In June The New York Times published a brief review by Miriam James, as for ages 4 to 6. She welcomed for reading aloud Colby's "smooth-talking style" and discouraged as a distraction "his occasional use of lettered-in dialogue" in the cartoon illustrations. • "For Younger Readers". The New York Times. June 17, 1951, p. BR13.) He began his non-fiction book writing with Our Fighting Jets in 1951. He specialized in outdoor subjects such as hunting, fishing, camping, and firearms. Many of his books were about military and public safety organizations or new technology, designed to be understood by children.

In 1959 Colby wrote his most popular book, Strangely Enough!, a collection of short non-fiction narratives about true life adventure, paranormal mysteries, UFOs, and other unusual events.

== Selected works ==
- Gabbit, the Magic Rabbit (Coward-McCann, 1951), self-illustrated, OCLC 53094868
- Our Fighting Jets (Coward-McCann, 1951)
- Art and Science of Taking to the Woods
- Firing Line! Weapons, Vehicles, Rockets, and Research (Coward-McCann, 1957)
- Our Space Age Jets (Coward-McCann, 1959)
- Bomber Parade: Headliners in Bomber Plane History (Coward-McCann, 1960)
- Historic American Forts: From Frontier Stockade to Coastal Fortress (Coward-McCann, 1963)
- Chute!: Air Drop for Defense and Sport
- Submarine Warfare: Men, Weapons, and Ships (Coward-McCann, 1967)
- FBI: The G-Men's Weapons and Tactics For Combat
- Six-shooter: Pistols, Revolvers, And Automatics, Past And Present
- Strangely Enough!
- Jets of the World: New Fighters, Bombers and Transports
- Fighter Parade: Headliners in Fighter Plane History
- First Rifle: How to Shoot It Straight and Use It Safe
- Musket to M-14 Pistols, Rifles and Machine Guns
- Leatherneck: The Training, Weapons and Equipment of the United States Marine Corps
- Fighting Gear of World War II Equipment and Weapons of the American G.I.
- The Weirdest People in the World
- World's Best True Ghost Stories
- World's Best Lost Treasure Stories
- Arms of our Fighting Men: Personal Weapons, Bazookas, Big Guns (revised edition: Coward, McCann & Geoghegan, 1972)
- Two Centuries of Weapons, 1776-1976 (Coward, McCann & Geoghegan, 1975)
- Two Centuries of Seapower, 1776-1976 (Coward, McCann & Geoghegan, 1976)
