= Thorp T-5 =

Student-built 1930s trainer aircraft

T-5
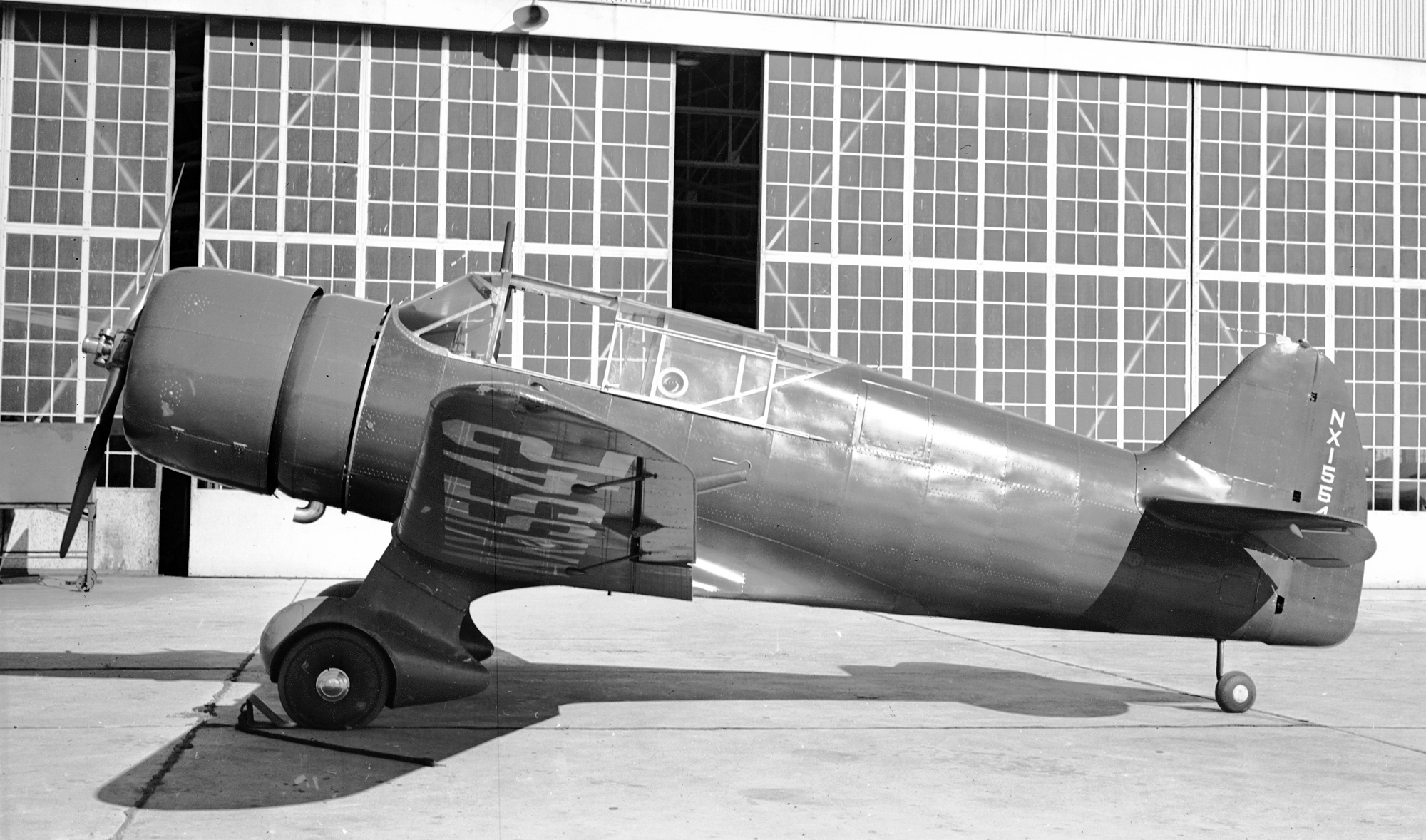
- The T-5 at Oakland Airport in 1939

General information
- Type: Trainer
- National origin: United States
- Manufacturer: Boeing School of Aeronautics
- Designer: John Thorp
- Number built: 1

History
- Introduction date: 1937
- First flight: 1939

The Boeing T-5 or Thorp T-5 was a student-built aircraft that was designed by John Thorp for the Boeing School of Aeronautics.

== Design and development ==
The T-5 was an all-metal, side-by-side configuration, low-wing, conventional landing gear-equipped aircraft. The prototype was test flown in 1939 by Eddie Allen.

== Variants ==
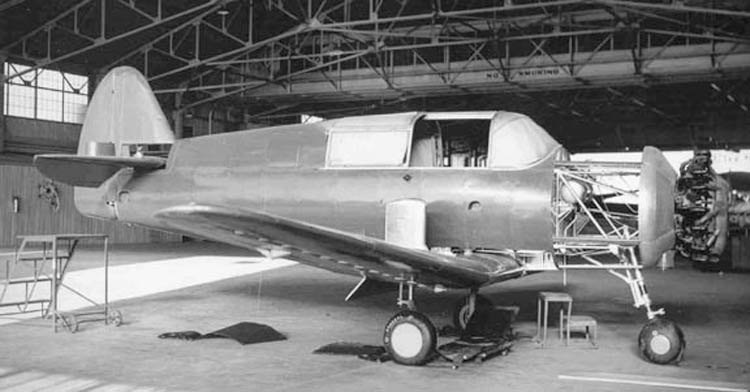
The T-6 variant, with tricycle gear

T-5
Taildragger prototype
T-6
Tricycle gear conversion of the T-5 with a Lycoming engine.

== Specifications (T-5) ==
Data from Popular Aviation

General characteristics

- Crew: 1
- Capacity: 1 passenger
- Powerplant: 1 × Wright R-760 radial engine, 350 hp (260 kW)

Performance

- Cruise speed: 233 mph (375 km/h, 202 kn)
- Range: 900 mi (1,400 km, 780 nmi)
