= Frederick Howard Buller =

Canadian engineer (1914–1994)

- Born: May 25, 1914; Vancouver, British Columbia, Canada
- Died: June 7, 1994 (aged 80); White Rock, British Columbia, Canada
- Occupation: Aeronautical engineer
- Spouse: Betty (Tillard) Buller
- Children: Jocelyn (Buller) Gabbert, Christopher Buller

Frederick Howard Buller (May 25, 1914 – June 7, 1994) was a Canadian aeronautical engineer.

== Early career ==
Buller was born in Vancouver, British Columbia, on May 25, 1914. He began with an interest in sailboat design. He attended University of British Columbia from 1932 to 1935. Thereafter, he spent several years studying naval architecture in Glasgow, Scotland. In 1937, he switched his focus to aeronautical engineering, moving to Oakland, California, to enroll in the Boeing School of Aeronautics. In 1939, he moved to Edmonton, Alberta and began working in the field with Aircraft Repair (later Northwest Industries). In 1943, he relocated to London, Ontario, assisting in the war efforts at Central Aircraft, a subsidiary of de Havilland. In September 1944, he settled in Downsview at de Havilland Aircraft of Canada Ltd (DHC), where he would remain for 35 years.

== Later career ==
At de Havilland, Buller, who became its Chief Designer, worked on the designs of a number of notable aircraft, including the Chipmunk and the de Havilland STOL Beaver. The Chipmunk was extensively used in training RAF and RCAF pilots. The Beaver, registered by then de Havilland president P.C. Garratt as ‘CF-FHB’ in honor of its designer, is on display in the Canadian National Aviation Museum in Ottawa. Buller was also involved in or oversaw the design of the DHC-3 Otter (1951), DHC-4 Caribou (1958), DHC-5 Buffalo (1964), DHC-6 Twin Otter (1965), and DHC-7 Dash 7 (1975). He was a consultant on HMCS Bras D’or, a hydrofoil commissioned by the Royal Canadian Navy.

A noted competitor in the 14-footer class (precursor to the International 14) at the Royal Canadian Yacht Club in Toronto and internationally, Buller initially expressed his interest in sailboat design through innovative customization of hulls designed by others (notably Charlie Bourke); his execution of a gybing centreboard was regarded as one of the first truly effective examples. In the early fifties, his Buller I and Buller II advanced both the general design in the class and its use of materials, as both boats were moulded in a material then new, fibreglass. Buller was also credited with bringing the tell-tale, a strip of string or cloth attached to a wing to test its aerodynamic qualities, over to the sailing world. A significant innovation in sailing at the time, sail tell-tales are now common.

In 1955, Buller became one of the founding members, and a Fellow, of the Canadian Aeronautics and Space Institute. Frederick Buller died on June 7, 1994, at White Rock, British Columbia.

== Honors ==
In 1971, the Canadian Aeronautics and Space Institute awarded Buller its McCurdy Award for his major contributions to the de Havilland family of STOL aircraft. The Engineering Centennial Board named the DHC-2 Beaver as among the ten best engineering accomplishments in Canada in 1987. In 1997 he was inducted into the de Havilland Hall of Fame, and in 1999 he was inducted into Canada’s Aviation Hall of Fame.

For his achievements on the racecourse and as a designer, Buller was in 2013 posthumously inducted into the Canadian International Fourteen Foot Dinghy Hall of Fame.
