= Lockheed Big Dipper =

Model 34 Big Dipper
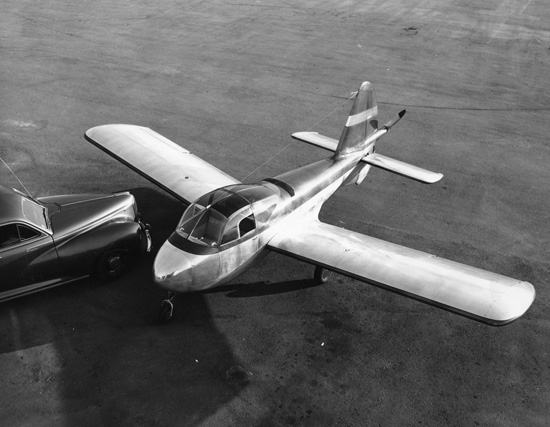

General information
- Type: Two-seat utility monoplane
- National origin: United States
- Manufacturer: Lockheed
- Designer: John Thorp
- Status: Crashed 6 February 1946
- Number built: 1

History
- First flight: 10 December 1945

The Lockheed Model 34 Big Dipper was an American two-seat monoplane, designed and built by Lockheed at Burbank for research into the company's potential entry into the civil lightplane and military light utility aircraft market. Only one was built, and following its loss in an accident the program was abandoned.

== Design and development ==
Developed by John Thorp and based on his work on Lockheed's Little Dipper lightplane project, the Lockheed Model 34, named "Big Dipper", was intended as a prototype for a lightplane to sell on the postwar market - Lockheed hoping to sell the aircraft at a price of $1500 - and as a potential 'flying jeep' for the United States Army. It was a low-wing cantilever monoplane with a fixed tricycle landing gear and a conventional empennage; the cabin was enclosed, seating two in side-by-side positions. Unusually the Continental C100 piston engine was fitted in the center fuselage behind the cabin, driving a two-bladed pusher propeller mounted at the rear of the aircraft.

== Operational history ==
The Model 34 was built at Burbank from July 1945. To keep the project secret the aircraft was moved to Palmdale by road when completed, flight testing being conducted at Muroc Dry Lake. It first flew on 10 December 1945, and after 40 hours of flight testing was returned to Burbank for modifications, intended to correct a wing-root stall issue that had been identified. It was decided not to complete the modification, and the aircraft was to be flown back to Palmdale on 6 February 1946. To try to keep the Big Dipper secret, it was decided to use a shorter upward sloping runway nearer the factory; in the steep climb needed during takeoff from the shorter runway, the aircraft stalled and crashed. With the loss of the prototype, and the fact the expected rush of buyers for new lightplanes was failing to materialize amidst a glut of war-surplus aircraft, the project, and a proposed high-wing four-seat "Super Dipper" derivative, was abandoned;

== Specifications ==
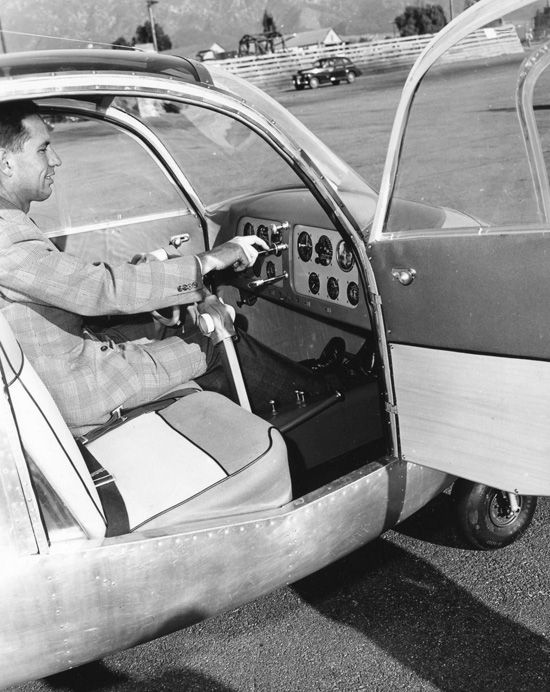
Cockpit of the Big Dipper

Data from Francillon 1982

General characteristics

- Crew: Two (pilot and passenger)
- Length: 22 ft 2 in (6.76 m)
- Wingspan: 31 ft 0 in (9.45 m)
- Height: 8 ft 10 in (2.69 m)
- Empty weight: 935 lb (424 kg)
- Gross weight: 1,450 lb (658 kg)
- Powerplant: 1 × Continental C100-12 piston engine four-cylinder air-cooled horizontally opposed piston engine, 100 hp (75 kW)

Performance

- Maximum speed: 136 mph (219 km/h, 118 kn)
- Cruise speed: 119 mph (192 km/h, 103 kn)
- Service ceiling: 16,000 ft (4,900 m)
- Rate of climb: 840 ft/min (4.3 m/s)

== See also ==
Related development

- Lockheed Little Dipper

Aircraft of comparable role, configuration, and era

- Douglas Cloudster II
- ERCO Ercoupe
- Globe Swift
- Ryan Navion
- Waco Aristocraft
