= Thorp T-18 =

American homebuilt aircraft

T-18
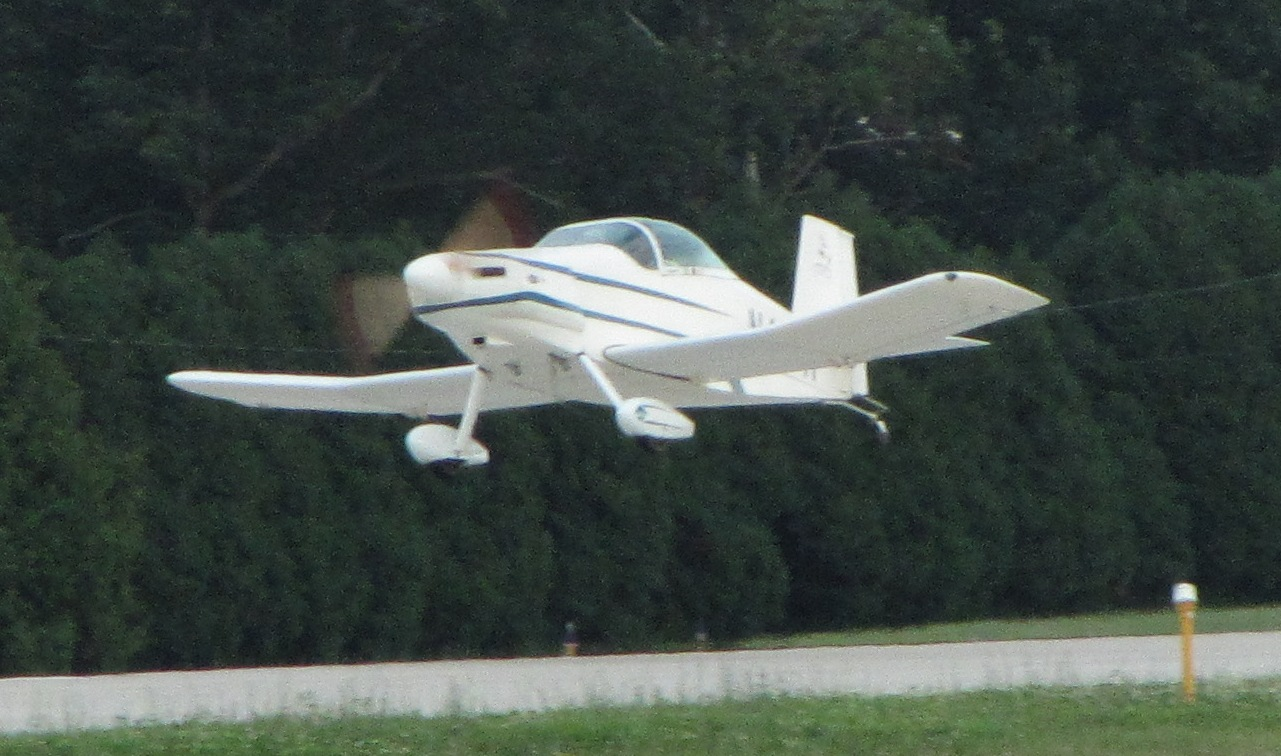
- Thorp T-18 in flight

General information
- Type: Amateur-built aircraft
- Manufacturer: Eklund Engineering
- Designer: John Thorp
- Number built: 400

History
- First flight: 1963

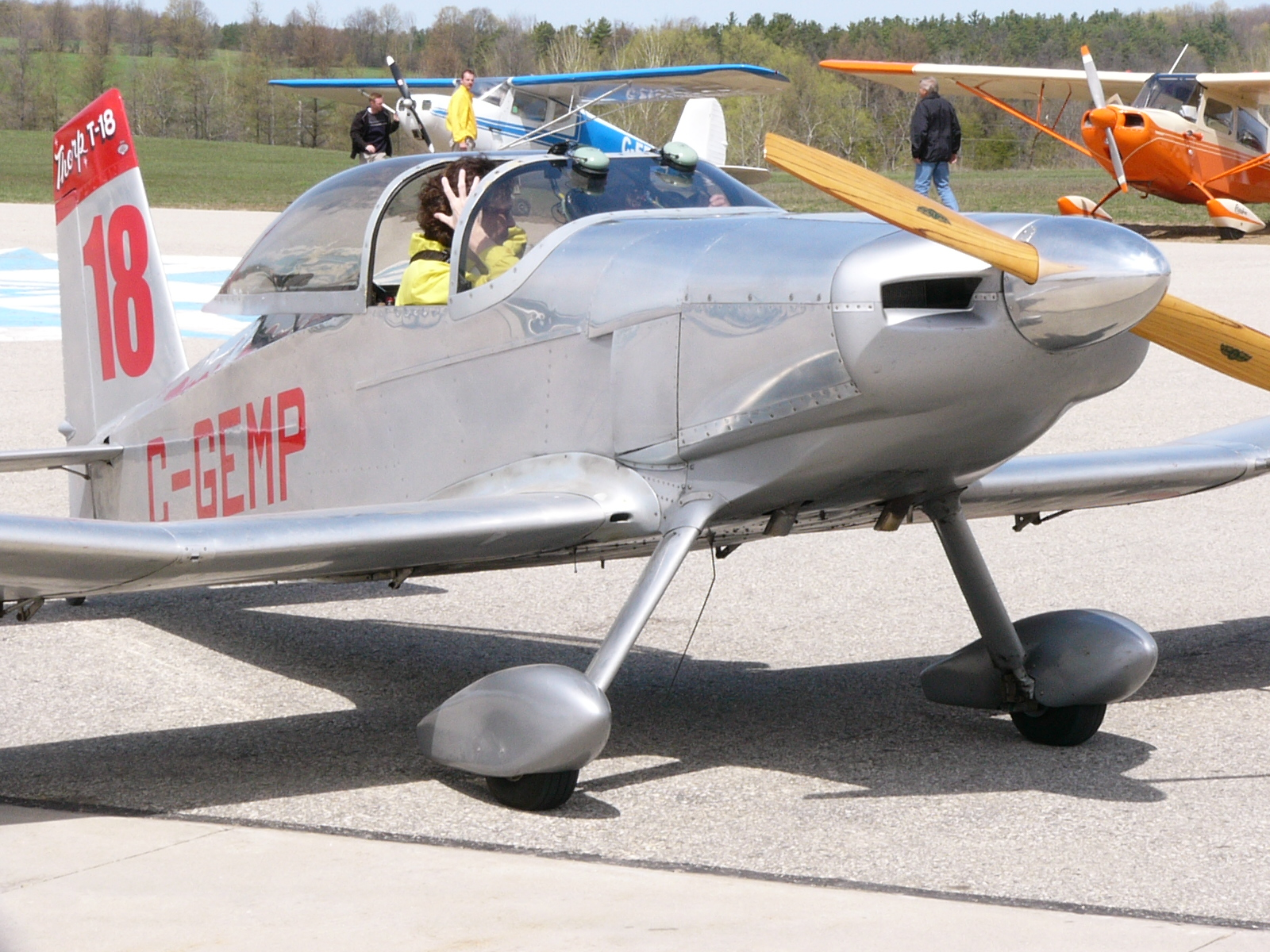
Thorp T-18

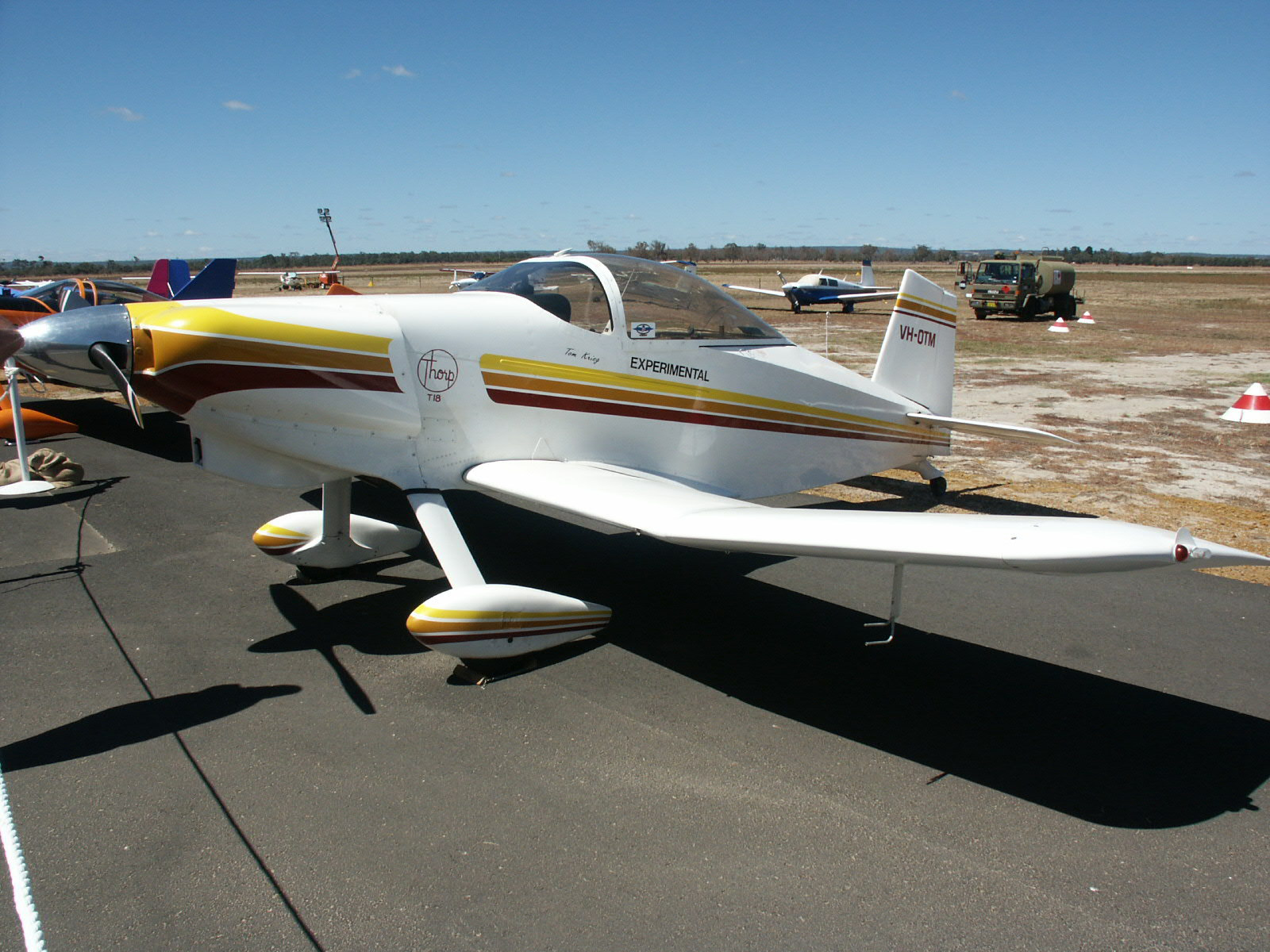
T-18

The Thorp T-18 is an American, two-place, all-metal, plans-built, homebuilt aircraft designed in 1963 by John Thorp.

The aircraft was originally designed as an open cockpit aircraft, powered by a military surplus Lycoming O-290G ground power unit engine, but evolved into a fully bubble canopied aircraft powered by engines of up to 200 hp (149 kW).

== Design and development ==
The T-18 was designed to be easily constructed from sheets of aluminum, and use a modified Lycoming O-290G. It was originally designed with an open cockpit and with the cylinder heads protruding through the engine cowling in the interest of simplicity. Even as originally designed, the cruising speed was quite high. The design showed great potential for higher performance and so modifications were created to install larger, cowled Lycomings and a bubble canopy. These modifications allow a T-18 with 125 hp (93 kW) to cruise at 160 mph (257 km/h) and higher-powered examples to cruise in excess of 200 mph (322 km/h). Some aircraft have been constructed with retractable landing gear.

These performance improvements made the T-18 one of the most popular homebuilt designs of the 1970s and early 1980s until the Van's Aircraft RV kitplane series came on the market.

The T-18 was designed to use the 125 hp (93 kW) Lycoming O-290G Ground Power Unit. At the time the T-18 was developed, these engines were inexpensive and widely available as military surplus generator motors. When converted for aircraft use they are virtually identical to the O-290D or O-290D2 aircraft engines.

Other Lycoming engines can be used, including the Lycoming O-320, Lycoming O-340, Lycoming O-360 and the Lycoming IO-360.

T-18 plans were available to builders from Eklund Engineering, which was also developing a laser-cut kit version and as of 2009 had aileron, flap and empennage kits. Classic Sport Aircraft at one time supplied plans, parts, and kits for the S-18 and the S-18T tricycle gear version, but went out of business in 2014. Thorp Central acquired the assets of Classic Sport Aircraft and now provides S-18 plans and parts.

By 2011 over 1600 sets of plans had been sold and 400 examples were flying.

== Operational history ==
One T-18, N455DT, was built by Donald Taylor of California and flown around the world from Oshkosh, Wisconsin, in 1976. This was the first successful circumnavigation of the world by a homebuilt aircraft. Taylor subsequently flew N455DT to the geographical North Pole, using a Sperry hybrid inertial navigation system.

Clive Canning flew another T-18 from Australia to England earlier the same year.

== Variants ==
T-18
Original model
T-18W
Modified T-18, with changes designed by Lou Sunderland to provide a 2 in (5.1 cm) wider fuselage.
T-18C
Modified T-18, with changes designed by Lou Sunderland to provide a "convertible" wing that rotates back against the fuselage for trailering or storage.
T-18CW
T-18 with wider fuselage and folding wing.
S-18
Similar to T-18CW, with modified airfoil and other minor changes. The Sunderland changes were made in collaboration with Thorp.

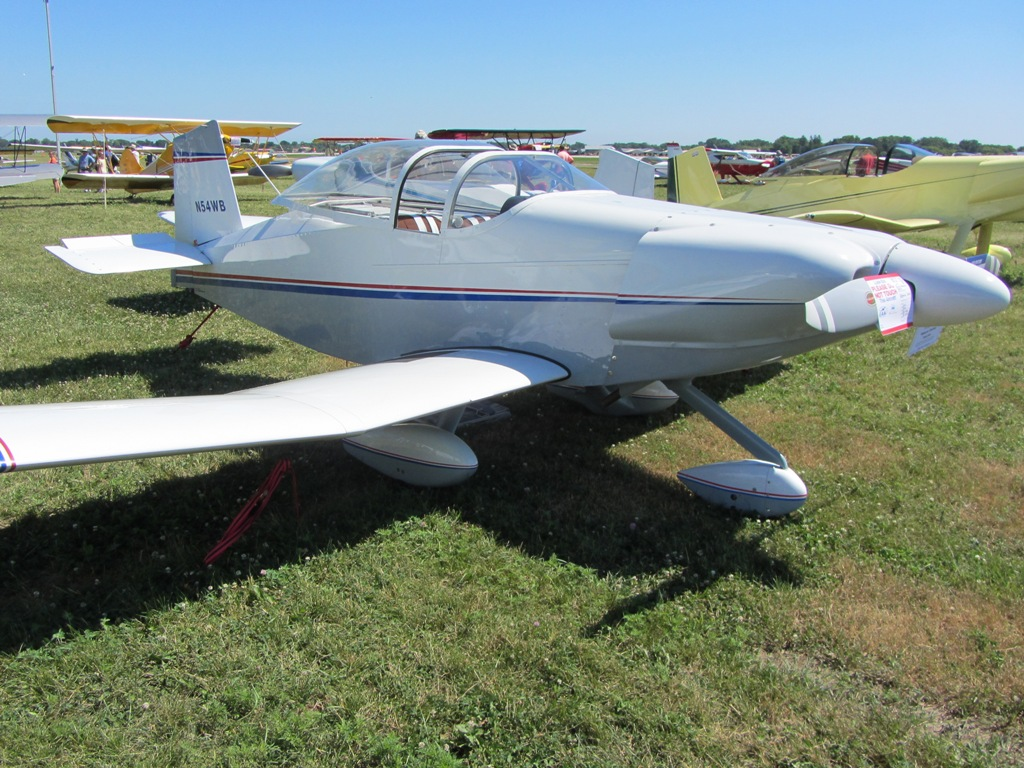
Thorp S-18T

S-18T
Tricycle landing gear version

== Specifications (S-18 with Lycoming O-360) ==
Data from Eklund & Classic Sport Aircraft & Thorp Central

General characteristics

- Crew: one
- Capacity: one passenger and 600 pounds (270 kg) loaded weight
- Length: 18 ft 10 in (5.77 m)
- Wingspan: 20 ft 10 in (6.35 m)
- Height: 5 ft 1 in (1.55 m)
- Wing area: 86 sq ft (8.0 m^{2})
- Empty weight: 1,000 lb (454 kg)
- Gross weight: 1,600 lb (726 kg)
- Powerplant: × Lycoming O-360 , 180 hp (135 kW)
- Propellers: 2-bladed constant speed propeller,, 6 ft 0 in (1.83 m) diameter

Performance

- Maximum speed: 200 mph (320 km/h, 170 kn)
- Cruise speed: 180 mph (292 km/h, 160 kn)
- Stall speed: 63 mph (101 km/h, 55 kn)
- Range: 540 mi (875 km, 470 nmi) , 900 mi (1,400 km) with optional wing tanks
- Rate of climb: 1,500 ft/min (7.6 m/s)
- Wing loading: 18.6 lb/sq ft (90 kg/m^{2})
- Power/mass: 8.9 lb/hp (0.19 kW/kg)

== See also ==
Related development

- Thorp T-211

Aircraft of comparable role, configuration, and era

- Jeffair Barracuda
- Mustang Aeronautics Mustang II
- Smyth Sidewinder
- Stoddard-Hamilton Glasair II
- Van's Aircraft RV-6
