= Boeing School of Aeronautics =

School in Oakland, California (1926–1945)

Coordinates: 37°43′59″N 122°12′45″W

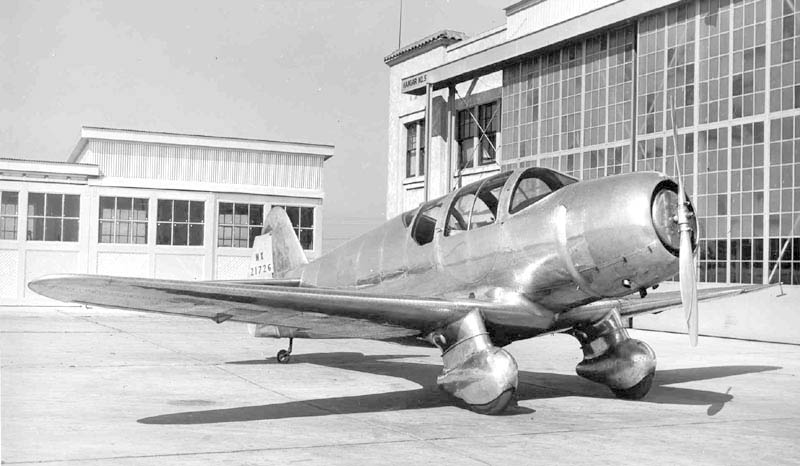
- Oakland Municipal Airport; Oakland, United States, California

Information
- Other name: United Air Lines Training Center
- School type: Aviation
- Established: September 16, 1929
- Founder: Boeing Airplane Company
- Closed: 1945
- Oversight: Aeronautical Chamber of Commerce
- Administrator: Theophilus Lee Jr.
- Director of flying: George Myers

The Boeing School of Aeronautics was a school that operated in Oakland, California from 1929 to 1945. It taught the design, maintenance, and flying of aircraft made by the Boeing Airplane Company. In its later years, the school was known as the United Air Lines Training Center.

== History ==
=== Founding ===
The Boeing School of Aeronautics was started by Boeing Corporation to train personnel for its subsidiary Boeing Air Transport. The school opened on September 16, 1929, at the Oakland Municipal Airport in Oakland, California, with nineteen staff and 100 students. At the time, this was the largest municipal airport in the United States. The school was licensed by the Aeronautical Chamber of Commerce, which licensed aviation schools in that period.

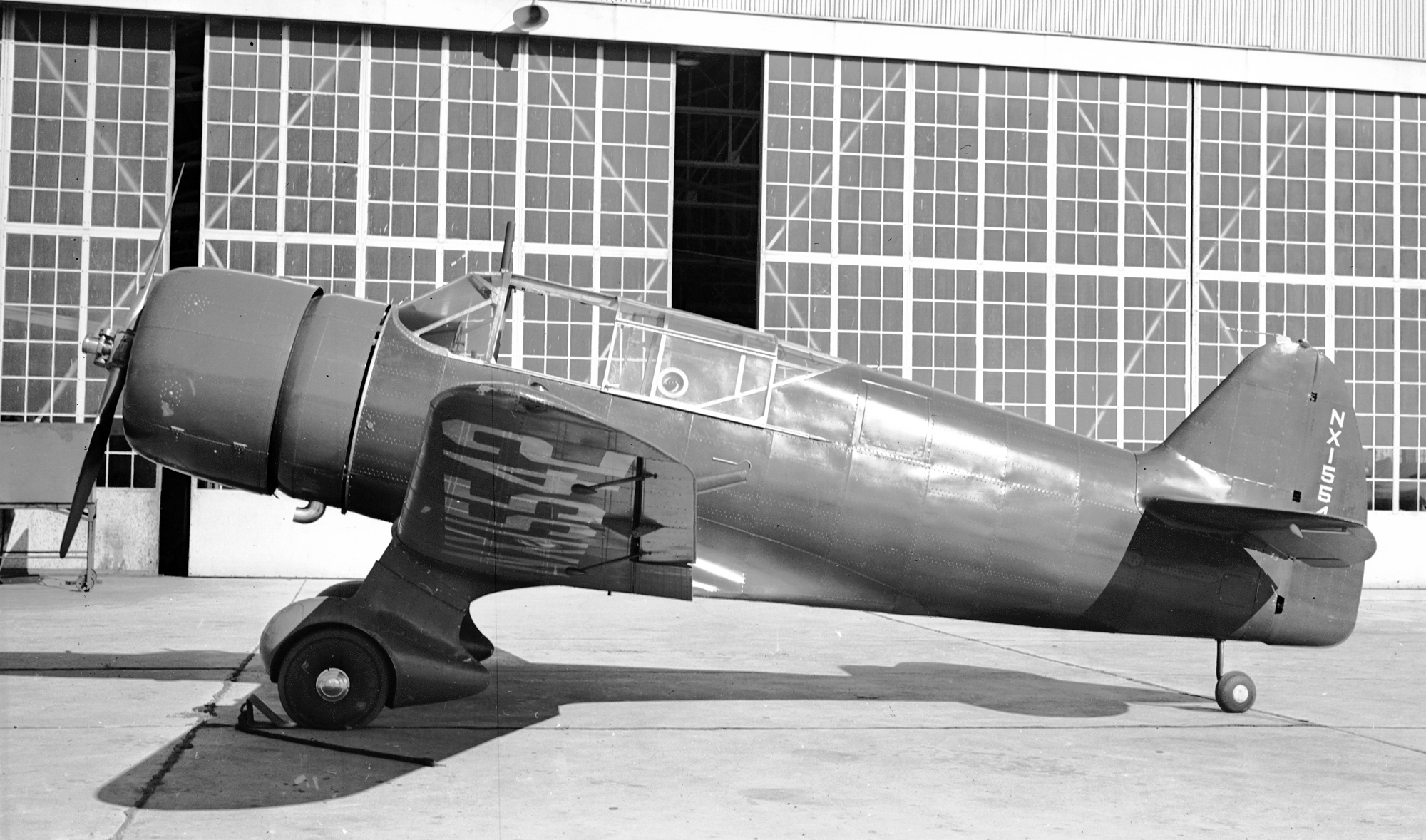
Boeing School, 1939

Theophilus Lee Jr. was the school's manager and George Myers was its director of flying. The school taught with early Boeing aircraft, including the Boeing Model 81 and Model 100 pursuit fighter and the Boeing Model 203. Students would help design, develop, test fly, and maintain Boeing aircraft, providing sales and engineering feedback to the parent company. Several original aircraft were designed by students and teachers, such as the 1939 Thorp T-5, and T-6.

By 1937, the school had expanded operations to 41 staff and 500 students.

=== World War II ===
In October 1938, General Henry H. Arnold of the U.S. Air Force invited representatives of the country's top three aviation schools to Washington, D.C., including Theophilus Lee Jr. of the Boeing School of Aeronautic Schools. Arnold asked that Lee, along with and Oliver Parks of Parks Air College and C. C. Moseley of the Curtiss-Wright Technical Institute, establish a startup called the Civilian Pilot Training Program (CPTP) to train cadets as aviation mechanics for the Air Force. Although the program had yet to receive funding from Congress, all three schools agreed to begin training, housing, and feeding cadets in preparation for the United States' entry into World War II.

The Boeing School expanded to fourteen buildings and 1,000 students at its peak in 1942. To meet wartime demand, the school suspended its commercial pilot training for United Airlines in August 1942.

=== Post War ===
By 1943, the Civilian Pilot Training Program contract had expired and Boeing absorbed the school operations into the parent company. The facilities remained under the name United Air Lines Training Center, which continued to train aviation mechanics under a U.S. Navy contract until its closing in 1945.

== Legacy ==
The Oakland Aviation Museum is located in a former Boeing School building, built in 1939.

== Notable alumni ==
- Peter M. Bowers – aeronautical engineer, airplane designer, journalist, and aviation historian
- Frederick Howard Buller – aeronautical engineer
- Jack Eckerd – businessman and owner of Eckerd drugstore chain
- Ted R. Smith – aircraft designer
- John Thorp – aeronautical engineer
- Ray Vasquez – singer, musician, and actor
- Lee Ya-Ching – a Chinese film actress and pioneering aviator
- Ed Yost – Father of the modern hot-air balloon

== Notable faculty ==
- Allan F. Bonnalie – World War I aviator
- John Thorp – aeronautical engineer

== See also ==
- History of Boeing
- Junior Birdmen
- Stearman Cloudboy

== External sources ==
- Insignia, Boeing School of Aeronautics, Smithsonian Institution
- Lapel Pin, Boeing School of Aeronautics, Smithsonian Institution
- Boeing School of Aeronautics (book)
- Lusk, H.F. "This School of Aeronautics Is Different", U.S. Air Services, September 1929
