= Smyth Sidewinder =

American homebuilt aircraft

Sidewinder
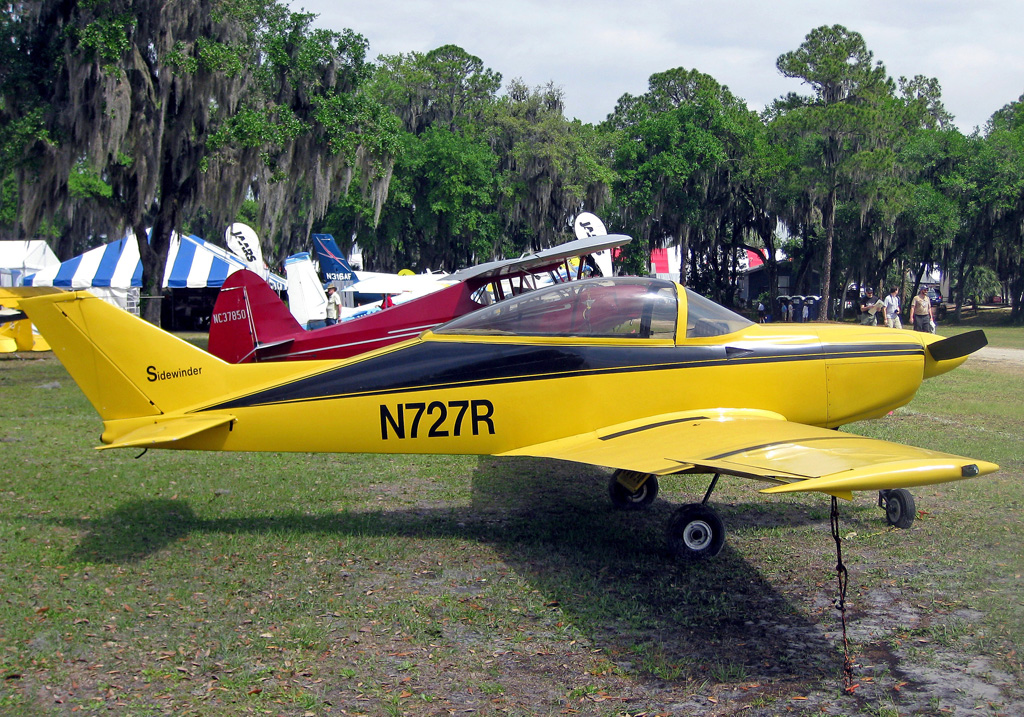
- 1976-built Sidewinder preserved at the Florida Air Museum at Lakeland Airport

General information
- Type: Homebuilt aircraft
- National origin: United States
- Designer: Jerry Smyth

History
- First flight: 21 February 1969

The Smyth Model S Sidewinder is an all-metal, two-seat side-by-side, low-wing homebuilt aircraft, designed and developed in the United States.

== Design and development ==
In 1958 Jerry Smyth began the design of a monoplane sport aircraft, intended to be easy to build and fly as well as stressed to +9g for aerobatics. Construction of the prototype began in January 1967, taking two years to complete. Smyth's first component-built was a hand-carved wooden control stick grip which he said "he built the plane around". Plans and kits for homebuilding were made available.

Constructed of welded steel tubing with aluminum skinning, the Sidewinder has all-aluminum wings and is stressed to ±9g ultimate loading to allow aerobatics. Engines can be fitted with power ratings from 90 to 180 hp (67 to 134 kW) (some say 65-125 hp), weighing up to 310 lb (141 kg), enclosed in a fibreglass cowling. A sliding canopy covers the cockpit, the landing gear uses some landing gear components from the Wittman Tailwind and conventional controls are fitted but with an all-flying tailplane for pitch control. An unusual under-fuselage spoiler is used for approach control., The original design shared the same windscreen as a Thorp T-18.

The prototype attended the 1969 Experimental Aircraft Association convention at Rockford, Illinois, winning the Outstanding Design Award.

Currently the rights to the Smyth Sidewinder are held by Sidewinder Aircraft LLC, which continues to market the design. 290 sets of plans had been sold by 1972, with at least 46 examples registered and flying.

== Specifications ==
Data from Jane's.

General characteristics

- Crew: one
- Capacity: one passenger
- Length: 19 ft 4 in (5.89 m)
- Wingspan: 24 ft 10 in (7.57 m)
- Height: 5 ft 5 in (1.65 m)
- Wing area: 96 sq ft (8.9 m^{2})
- Aspect ratio: 6.44
- Airfoil: NACA 64-212 - NACA 64-210
- Empty weight: 1,012 lb (459 kg)
- Max takeoff weight: 1,450 lb (658 kg)
- Fuel capacity: 17.5 US gal (66 L)
- Powerplant: 1 × Lycoming O-290 horizontally opposed piston aircraft engine, 125 hp (93 kW)
- Propellers: 2-bladed fixed pitch aluminium alloy, 5 ft 7 in (1.70 m) diameter

Performance

- Maximum speed: 152 kn (175 mph, 282 km/h)
- Cruise speed: 140 kn (160 mph, 260 km/h) 75% power at 2,000 ft (610 m)
- Stall speed: 48 kn (55 mph, 89 km/h)
- Never exceed speed: 170 kn (200 mph, 320 km/h)
- Range: 369 nmi (425 mi, 684 km)
- Service ceiling: 15,000 ft (4,600 m)
- g limits: ±9
- Rate of climb: 900 ft/min (4.6 m/s) sea level at 24°C

== See also ==
Aircraft of comparable role, configuration, and era

- Thorp T-18
