= Franklin 2 series =

American two-cylinder air-cooled horizontally opposed aircraft engines

- Type: Two-cylinder horizontally opposed air-cooled piston engine
- National origin: United States
- Manufacturer: Franklin Engine Company

The Franklin 2 series of American two-cylinder air-cooled horizontally opposed aircraft engines were produced in the 1930s and 1940s.

== Variants ==
Data from:

=== O-110 ===
2A4-45
45 hp (34 kW) at 2,650rpm
2A4-49
49 hp (37 kW) at 3,000rpm
2A-110
60 hp (45 kW) at 3,000rpm
2AL-112
alternative designation of the 2A4-45
PZL-F2A
The Franklin 2 series produced under licence in Poland

=== O-120 ===
2A-120
60 hp (45 kW) at 3,200rpm
PZL-F2A-120-C1
Production in Poland of the 2A-120

== Applications ==
Data from:

- Bellanca 7ACA Champion
- Lockheed Little Dipper
- PZL-126 Mrówka
- Sportavia RF 5S
- VTC SSV-17
- Wallis WA-116/F
- Wallis WA-121/F
- WSK-PZL Krosno KR-02 Krokodyl
- PZL SZD-45-2 Ogar

== See also ==
Related lists

- List of aircraft engines
