= Thorp T-211 =

1945 American light aircraft

T-211
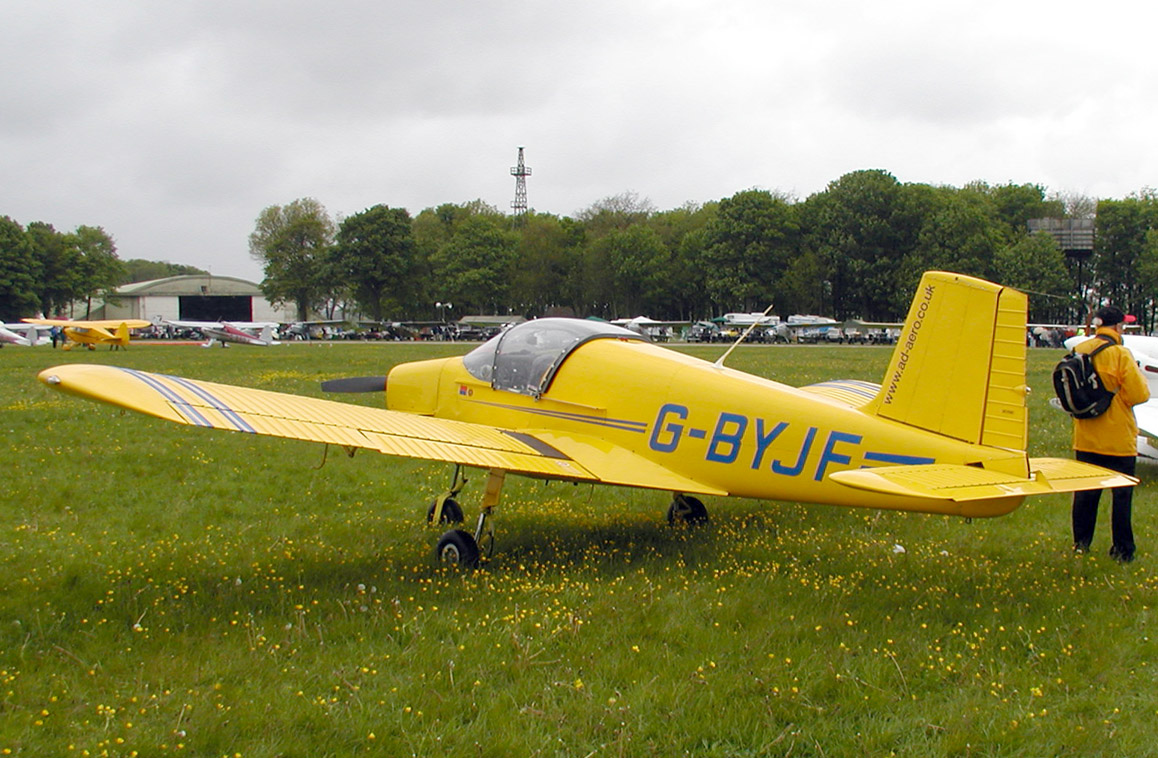

General information
- Type: sportplane
- Manufacturer: Homebuilt design IndUS Aviation as Light Sport
- Designer: John Thorp
- Status: In production (2015)

History
- First flight: 1945

The T-211 is a light aircraft designed in the US by John Thorp in 1945. It is a low-wing monoplane of conventional layout with a fixed tricycle undercarriage and a sliding canopy. John Thorp developed the Sky Scooter (Note: Sometimes written as the "Sky Skooter".) with lessons learned from developing the Lockheed Little Dipper project in 1944. It bears some family resemblance to the Piper Cherokee, a design that Thorp later significantly contributed to.

== Development ==
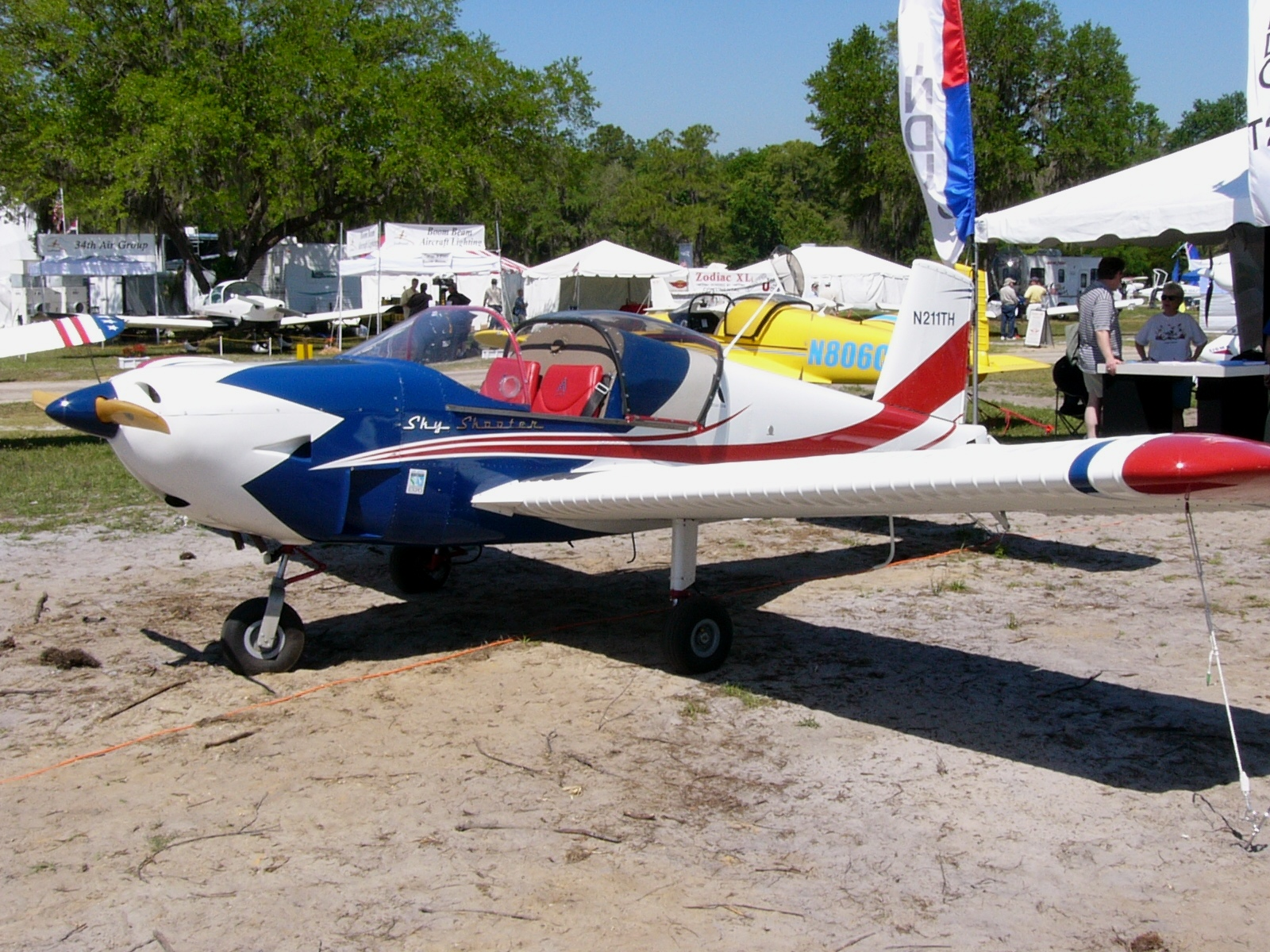
2005-built Indus T211 Sky Scooter

John Thorp started the initial design for a small two-seat light aircraft, which became the T-11, while he was working at Lockheed's Vega Division, developing it in parallel with the single-seat Little Dipper. Following the end of the Second World War, Thorp left Lockheed and set up his own company in Burbank, California to build the T-11, soon moving to Van Nuys. The first prototype, registration NX-91301, made its maiden flight on August 15, 1946.

Thorp constructed eight prototypes, had the design certified by the FAA but was unable to find a foothold in the Cessna-dominated post-war US market. The original prototypes were powered by a 65 hp Lycoming engine. Novel features of the Sky Scooter include an all-movable horizontal stabilizer and externally ribbed wings and tailplane. The wings were corrugated to impart stiffness, each wing needing only three internal ribs. This feature simplified construction, reduced the number of rivets (and weight), and helped control the spanwise flow of air over the wings. The T-211 was developed with a 90-horsepower Continental upgrade in 1953. The project was therefore shelved until the homebuilding boom saw the rights to the aircraft acquired first by Adams Industries and then by Thorp Aero in the 1970s, the latter firm building five examples as the Thorp Arrow or T-211 Aero Sport built in Sturgis Kentucky, but only sold overseas or to part 141 operations due to current liability laws. The kits were then manufactured by AD Aerospace in the United Kingdom and Venture Light Aircraft in the United States.

IndUS Aviation began production of the T-211 according to the guidelines of Light Sport Aircraft in the mid-2000s. The Thorp T-211 was the first US-designed Special Light Sport Aircraft to receive certification from the Federal Aviation Administration. The light-sport version uses the 120 hp (89 kW) Jabiru 3300 engine, while the type certified version uses a 100 hp (75 kW) Continental O-200 engine and is equipped for both VFR and IFR flying.

In 2010, the aircraft was also back in production as a kit aircraft by AD Aerospace of Manchester, United Kingdom. This model is powered by a four-cylinder 100 hp (75 kW) Continental O-200 or a six-cylinder 120 hp (89 kW) Jabiru 3300 powerplant.

== Variants ==
Thorp Sky Scooter
1946
Piper PA-10
Sky Scooter derivative proposed by Piper Aircraft. The PA-10 was to have been powered by a 65 hp (48 kW) engine. The project was canceled in 1946 without any being built. Piper revisited the idea of producing a derivative of the Sky Scooter in 1952. However, in 1957, Piper instead chose to build a clean sheet design as the Piper PA-28 Cherokee, with preliminary design work being conducted by John Thorp.
Thorp T-211
1953
Tubular Aircraft Products
1965 - Built 100 parts kits with Continental O-200 powerplants with 11 production models built
Thorp Aero
1983 - Purchased rights and tooling
IndUS Aviation
LSA production in India

== Specifications (T-211) ==
Data from Jane's All the World's Aircraft 1982–83

General characteristics

- Crew: 1 pilot
- Capacity: 1 passenger
- Length: 18 ft 0 in (5.49 m)
- Wingspan: 25 ft 0 in (7.62 m)
- Height: 8 ft 0 in (2.44 m)
- Wing area: 105.0 sq ft (9.75 m^{2})
- Empty weight: 733 lb (332 kg)
- Max takeoff weight: 1,270 lb (576 kg)
- Fuel capacity: 23 US gal (19 imp gal; 87 L)
- Powerplant: 1 × Continental O-200-A air-cooled flat four, 100 hp (75 kW)
- Propellers: 2-bladed McCauley fixed pitch propeller, 5 ft 7 in (1.70 m) diameter

Performance

- Maximum speed: 158 mph (254 km/h, 137 kn) at sea level
- Cruise speed: 120 mph (190 km/h, 100 kn) (75% power)
- Stall speed: 39 mph (63 km/h, 34 kn) (flaps down)
- Range: 480 mi (770 km, 420 nmi) at 55% power
- Service ceiling: 19,000 ft (5,800 m)
- Rate of climb: 950 ft/min (4.8 m/s) at sea level

== See also ==
Related development

- Thorp T-18

Aircraft of comparable role, configuration, and era

- Erco Ercoupe
- Grumman American AA-1
