= IndUS Aviation =

- Industry: Aerospace
- Founded: 1994
- Founder: Ram Pattisapu, M.D.
- Defunct: 2017
- Fate: Out of business
- Headquarters: Dallas, Texas, United States
- Products: Kit aircraft

IndUS Aviation was American light aircraft manufacturer founded in 1994 that was headquartered in Dallas, Texas at the Dallas Executive Airport. While it was in business the company manufactured variants of the Thorp T-211 and the T-111, originally designed by John Thorp. Sub-assembly and component manufacturing was contracted out to the Indian company Taneja Aerospace & Aviation with final assembly at the company's Dallas factory.

IndUS Aviation was developing an improved version of the Thorp T-211 which they called the Thorpedo LP.

By February 2010 the company had 28 aircraft delivered and registered with the FAA, including one T-11 Sky Skooter and 27 T-211s.

In March 2010, due to the Great Recession, the company entered a reorganization. By March 2017 the company reorganization was still indicated as underway. By mid-2017 the company website had been blanked and the company was likely no longer in business.

== Products ==
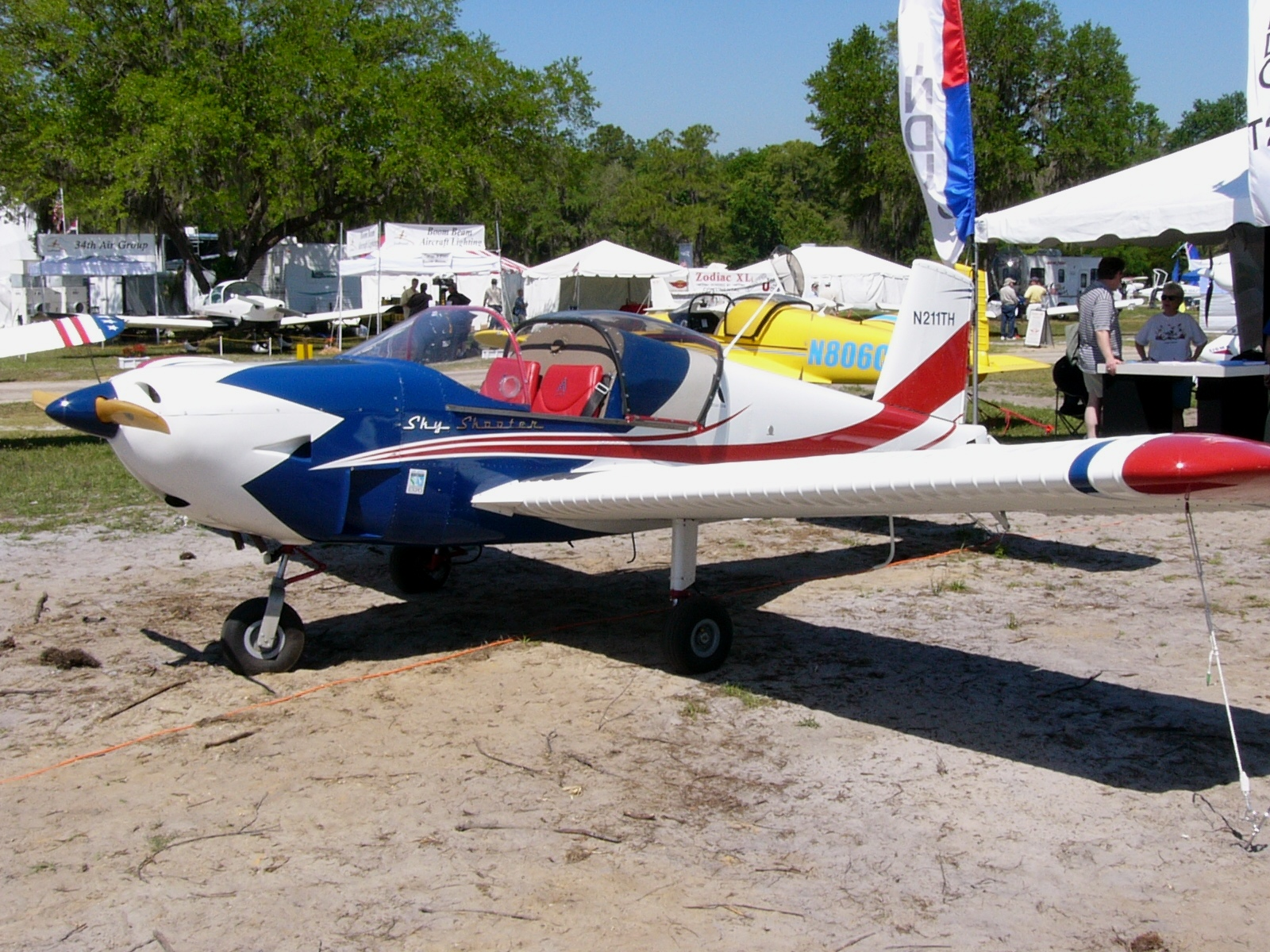
Thorp T-211 Sky Skooter on display at the IndUS Aviation booth at Sun 'n Fun 2006

SkySkooter (T-111)
The SkySkooter is based on the T-111 with an 85 hp (63 kW) Jabiru 2200 engine and is accepted as a light-sport aircraft.
Thorpedo (T211)
The Thorpedo is based on the Thorp T211 with a lighter 120 hp (89 kW) Jabiru 3300 engine and it is accepted as a light-sport aircraft.
Certified T211
This aircraft is an FAA certified Thorp T211, similar to the original model and has a 100 hp (75 kW) Continental O-200A engine. It is available in two variants, one with VFR avionics and another with IFR equipment.
Thorpedo DP
A prototype diesel-powered variant of the T-211 was produced in 2008, it is fitted with a WAM 120 two-stroke inverted diesel engine.

== See also ==
- List of aircraft manufacturers
