= Boeing Model 203 =

Model 203

General information
- Type: Biplane trainer
- National origin: United States
- Manufacturer: Boeing
- Primary user: Boeing School of Aeronautics
- Number built: 7

History
- First flight: 1 July 1929

The Boeing Model 203 was a three-seat biplane trainer built by Boeing in the late 1920s and used in the company training school.

== Development and design ==
The 203 was a low-power biplane designed to compete with other standard training aircraft. Its front cockpit accommodated two passengers side-by-side, or one student with a second set of controls. Its fuselage was welded steel tubing (the last Boeing aircraft to be built this way) and its wings were made of solid wood spars and plywood ribs. Physically it resembled a combination of the Boeing Model 95 and Boeing P-12.

Initially five 203s were built. The first had a 145 hp engine, and first flew on 1 July 1929. The second aircraft was fitted with a 165 hp 5-cylinder Wright J-6-5 engine. It first flew on 29 August 1929 and was designated Model 203A. The final three aircraft had the original Axelson engine, upgraded to 165 hp. All aircraft were delivered to the Boeing School of Aeronautics in Oakland, California, and all were eventually converted into 203As.

After years of service, the vertical tails of the 203As were redesigned to align with those on the Boeing Model 218. Two more aircraft were built at the Boeing School, one in 1935 and one in 1936.

By 1941 the two new 203s and an original aircraft were converted to 203Bs. A larger 220 hp 9-cylinder Lycoming R-680 radial engine was installed, and more advanced training equipment was fitted for use by more advanced students.

When the Boeing School was closed due to the Second World War, the four 203As were transferred to United Air Lines at Cheyenne, Wyoming, two 203Bs were sold to a private owner, and the fate of the final 203B is unknown.

== Variants ==
203
prototype powered by a 115 hp (86 kW) Axelson A radial engine and four production aircraft powered by 145–165 hp (108–123 kW) Axelson B radial engines; four built.
203A
The second 203 produced with a 165 hp (123 kW) Wright J-6-5 engine and the three 203s converted, by replacing their Axelson engines. Also, two additional aircraft built in 1935 and 1936 :three built and three converted.
203B
Three 203As converted to 203Bs by installation of 220 hp (164 kW) Lycoming R-680 radial engines.

== Operators ==
United States

- Boeing School of Aeronautics
- United Air Lines

== Specifications (203) ==
Data from Boeing aircraft since 1916

General characteristics

- Crew: 1
- Capacity: 1-2 passengers
- Length: 24 ft 4 in (7.42 m)
- Wingspan: 34 ft 0 in (10.36 m)
- Empty weight: 1,896 lb (860 kg)
- Gross weight: 2,625 lb (1,191 kg)
- Powerplant: 1 × Axelson B 7-cylinder air-cooled radial piston engine, 145–165 hp (108–123 kW)
- Propellers: 2-bladed fixed-pitch propeller

Performance

- Maximum speed: 108 mph (174 km/h, 94 kn) (with 145 hp (108 kW) Axelson)
- Cruise speed: 92 mph (148 km/h, 80 kn)
- Range: 400 mi (640 km, 350 nmi)
