= AD Aerospace =

British aircraft interiors manufacturer

AD Aerospace are involved in Aircraft Video Surveillance and form part of the Mythra Group of companies.

Headquartered in Hazel Grove, Cheshire, UK at purpose-built premises, making Flight Deck Entry/Cockpit Door Surveillance Systems (FDEVSS/CDSS), Cabin Surveillance Systems and Cargo Surveillance Systems, as well as Ground Manoeuvring and In Flight Entertainment (IFE) systems utilising external cameras. External Camera systems have proved popular with Airbus Helicopters (formerly Eurocopter) and was chosen for the H175/EC175 helicopter. AD Aerospace also offer a VIP Cabin Surveillance Solution which is an option for 1st Class pods or Business Class cabins comprising a HD-SDI covert camera in the passenger cabin and monitor at the cabin attendant's seat.

AD Aerospace achieved Boeing approved supplier status as early as 2001 with an order to fit a video smoke verification system to the entire Swiss Air fleet. This was carried out in response to the Peggy's Cove disaster and consisted of environmentally protected cameras being fitted throughout inaccessible areas of the aircraft such as the cargo hold, cabin overheads and avionics bay.

The first aerospace certified video server was produced by AD Aerospace for a FlightVu Defender system for Lufthansa Technik in 1999.

In November 2001 AD Aerospace received the first order for video cameras for cockpit door security from JetBlue which would become the first fleet wide fit of a Cockpit Door Monitoring System.

AD Aerospace has supplied the Cargo Surveillance System, to Boeing for use on the B747-400 Boeing Dreamlifter to monitor the status of the B787 Dreamliner's fuselage parts in transit. AD is also a production partner for Flight Deck Entry Video Surveillance systems on B737, B747, B757, B767 and B777 aircraft.

AD Aerospace also has a working relationship with COMAC in China and supplies video surveillance equipment for both the ARJ21 and C919 programs.

In addition to their work with OEMs, AD Aerospace work with airlines and leasing companies with existing customers across the globe including; United Airlines, Air China, Jet2.com, Lufthansa, TUI, Aeroflot, Qatar Airways, Aviation Capital Group, AerCap and GECAS.
