= John Thorp (engineer) =

American aeronautical engineer

John Willard Thorp
- Born: 20 June 1912
- Died: 18 April 1992 (aged 79)
- Known for: Aerospace Engineer

John Willard Thorp (June 20, 1912 – April 18, 1992) was an American aeronautical engineer who made significant contributions to aircraft design throughout his life.

Born in French Camp, California, John Thorp grew up from age four in the historic Locke family home in Lockeford, California. He was educated in the Lockeford and Lodi public schools, and the Boeing School of Aeronautics in Oakland, California. Thorp worked on the Boeing 247 final assembly line and then returned to teach at the Boeing School. Starting flying in 1929, he received his private license in 1930 and by 1935 had flown 30 different types of aircraft in over 200 flying hours. By 1946 he had over 600 flight hours in 62 different aircraft types. Thorp started designing personal aircraft at the Boeing School. As Lockheed Assistant Preliminary Design Engineer, he was responsible for the preliminary design of the P2V "Neptune", Naval patrol bomber. In 1946 the famous P2V "Truculent Turtle" set the unrefueled distance record of 11,236 statute miles (18,083 km). This record stood for more than ten years, until finally broken in 1962 by a Boeing B-52H Stratofortress from Minot AFB, ND.

== Aircraft designs ==
The following light aircraft were designed by John Thorp during his career:

=== 1930s ===
- T-1 - 1931 Design study of a two place light plane
- T-2 - 1932 Design study

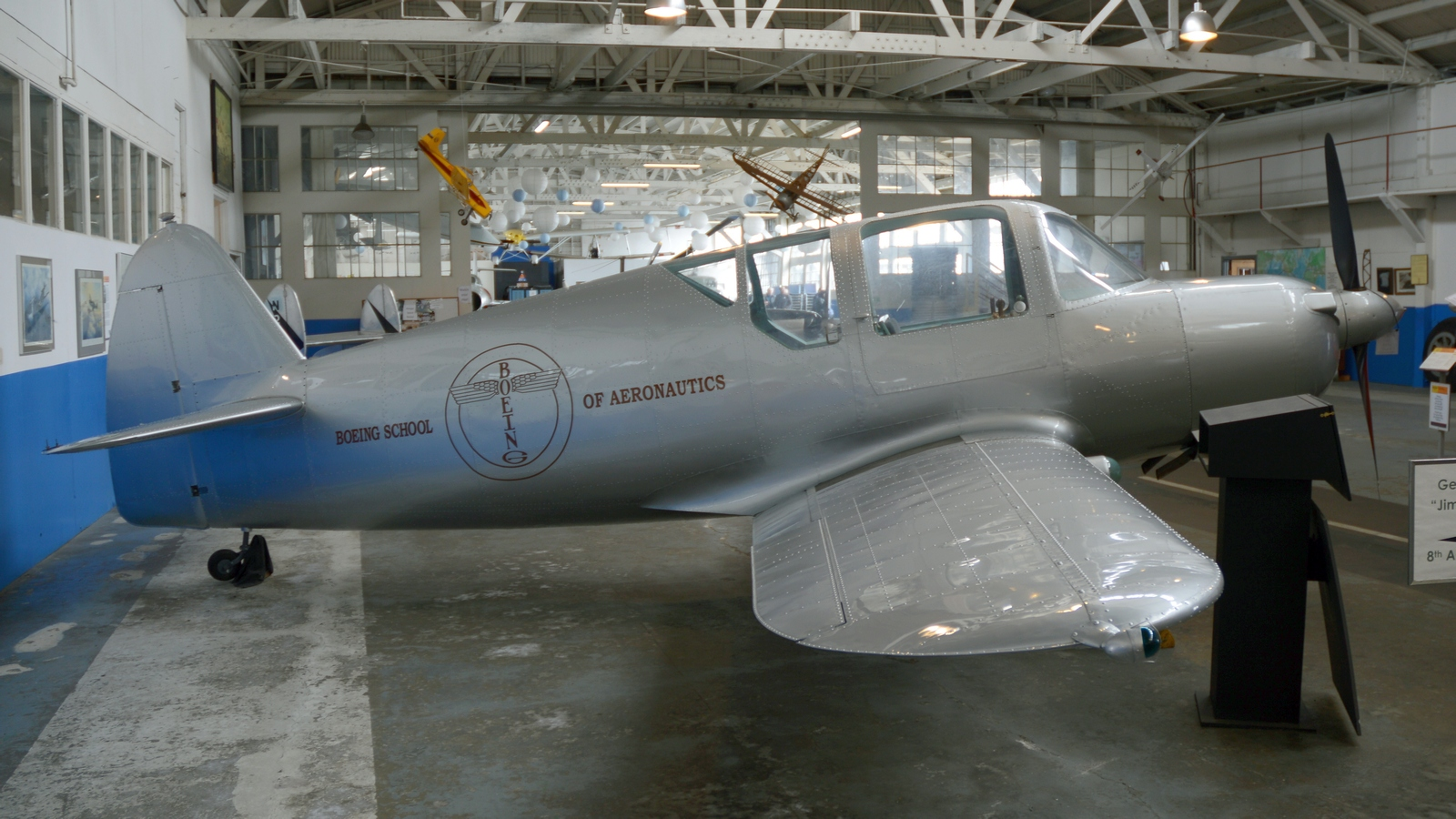
Thorp Paulic T-3B displayed at the Oakland Aviation Museum, California

- T-3B - 1933 Two/Four place, all metal, retractable, built by Rudy Paulic
- T-4 - 1934 Design study
- T-5 - 1935 Tandem two-place trainer, built by Boeing School
- T-6 - 1936 Modified T-5 with tricycle landing gear, built by Boeing School
- T-7 - 1939 Design study of an all wood airplane

=== 1940s ===
- T-8 - 1940 Design study
- T-9 - 1941 Design study
- Mod 33 1942 Lockheed Model 33 Little Dipper single place for flying infantryman
- Mod 34 1943 Lockheed Model 34 Big Dipper two place single engine pusher
- T-10 - 1944 Series "I" Sky Skooter - Taildragger - proposed engine Franklin 2AC-99 50 hp
- T-11 - 1945 Sky Skooter, 65 hp (48 kW) Lycoming O-145. FAR Part 23 certification
- TL-1 - 1948 Design study - Liaison Airplane

=== 1950s ===
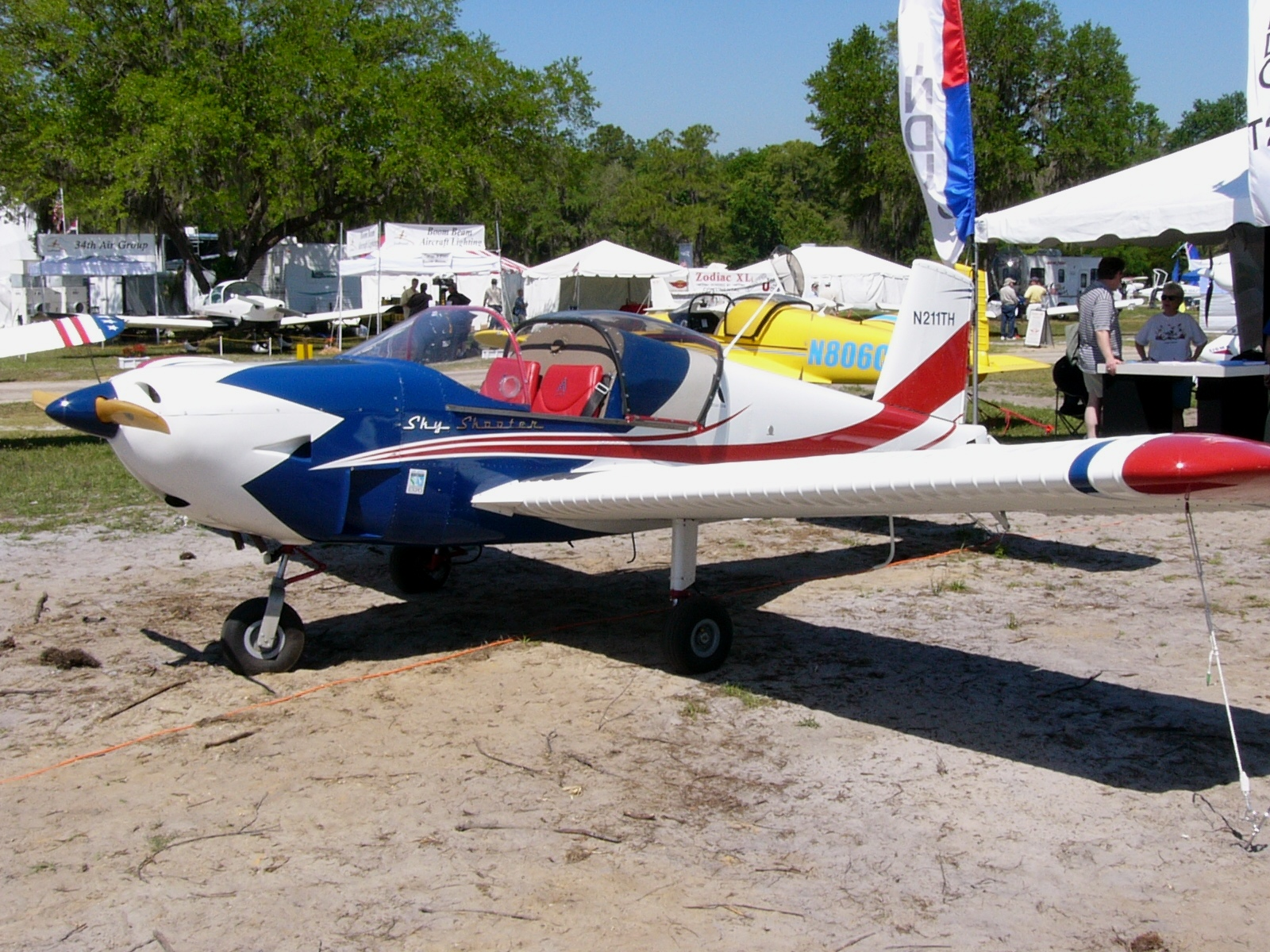
Thorp T-211 Sky Skooter on display at the IndUS Aviation booth at Sun 'n Fun 2006

- T-111 - 1953 Sky Skooter, 75 hp (56 kW) Lycoming O-145. FAR Part 23 certification.
- T-211 - 1963 Sky Skooter, 100 hp (75 kW) Continental O-200. FAR Part 23 certification.
- T-12 - 1945-50 Design study.
- T-13 - 1950 FL-23, high wing observation prototype built by Fletcher Aviation.
- T-14 - 1951 FD-25, "Defender" armed light plane, 225 hp (168 kW) Continental, by Fletcher Aviation.
- T-15 - 1952 FU-24, agricultural aircraft for Aerial Topdressing market, prototype built by Fletcher Aviation, large scale production in New Zealand.
- T-16 - 1956-58 180 hp, Piper Cherokee preliminary design. PA-28 first built with 150 hp (110 kW).
- T-17 - 1958 Wing Derringer original design. Began as twin engine Skooter.

=== 1960s ===
- T-18 - 1960 All metal two place, high performance homebuilt.
  - Don Taylor's T-18 was first homebuilt to fly around the world.
  - Clive Canning flew his T-18 from Australia to England and return.
- T-19 - 1962 Design study - Four place, twinjet aircraft using Williams Research engine.

=== 1970s ===
- T-20 - 1971 Design study - Single place, open cockpit sport plane
- T-21 - 1971 Design study - Utility airplane.
- T-22 - 1972 Design study - Sport plane.
- T-23 - 1972 Design study - Single place high performance sport plane.
- SE5-F 1973 WWI replica - Prototype built.
- T-28 - 1974 Design study - Two place, twin engine airplane based on the T-18.
