= Junior Birdmen =

Former model plane youth organization

The Junior Birdmen of America was a national organization for boys and girls interested in aviation and model plane building, founded (ca. 1934) and promoted by the Hearst Communications newspaper chain, with the cooperation of the U.S. Bureau of Air Commerce.

The Junior Birdmen of America (JBA) program was officially launched on April 15, 1934, with notices published in every William Randolph Hearst-owned newspaper in America. There were 17 Hearst-owned newspapers involved initially as "Junior Birdmen Wing City Newspapers," including his flagship San Francisco Examiner, the Hearst New York American, the Hearst New York Evening Journal, the Hearst Pittsburgh Sun-Telegraph, the Hearst Detroit Times and Detroit Sunday Times, the Hearst San Antonio Light, the Hearst Chicago American, the Hearst Chicago Herald-Examiner, the NY Syracuse Journal and Syracuse Sunday American, and Hearst's Boston American (its Flight Squadron Plan application form and letter listed 22 Hearst newspapers). The cost to join and become a JBA member originally was one dime sent to your local Hearst newspaper. Within a year, Hearst newspapers were reporting Junior Birdmen membership was over 151,000 by 1935. The Hearst Newspapers supported the program with daily and weekly articles, and with local and national events and competitions sponsored around the country. By 1937, there were over 578,000 members.

In August 1937, after four years of sponsorship, the Junior Birdmen of America program in its entirety passed from the Hearst News corporation to an independent organization in New York City, as the Hearst Corporation, which was unable to service its existing debts, faced a court-mandated reorganization in 1937. Hearst newspapers also ceased publishing the official daily column of the JBA and the Sunday Birdmen Feature Page in August 1937. The new Junior Birdmen of America organization and United Air Lines sponsored a scholarship award program in 1937 for an 18-month course in airline operations at the Boeing School of Aeronautics in Oakland, Calif., which included free air transport to and from the school and living expenses while attending classes. It was noted that Junior Birdmen of America, Inc. was defunct by 1939.

The organization's motto was "Today Pilots of Models — Tomorrow Model Pilots," but it is now best remembered for the song "Up in the Air, Junior Birdmen", which has been sung with a variety of lyrics to mock would-be or inexperienced aviators. In a sequence in the hugely successful 1955 film, To Hell and Back, Audie Murphy's infantry companions irritate a group of Army Air Corpsmen by singing a version of the song.
