= PZL-126 Mrówka =

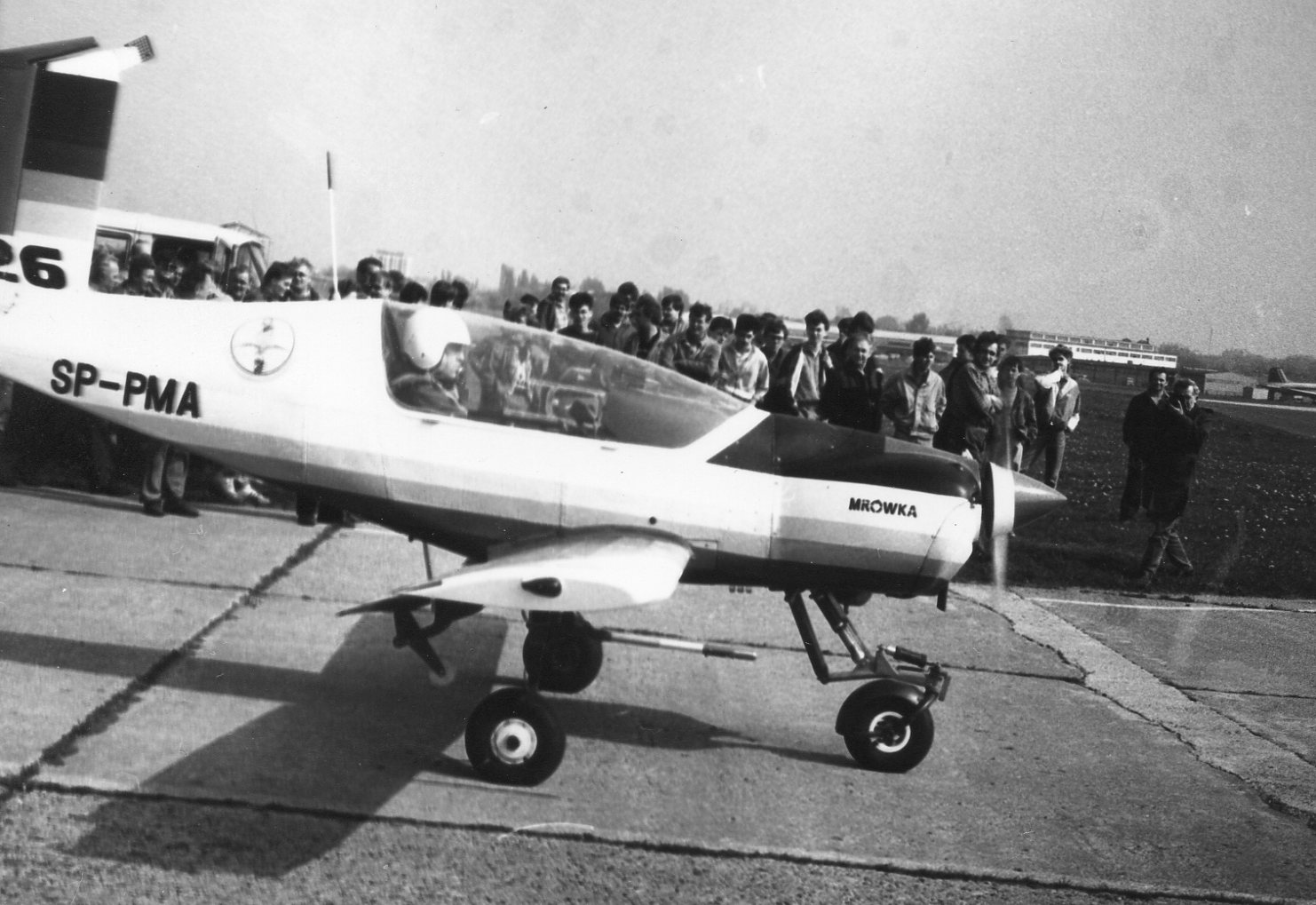

General information
- Type: Agricultural aircraft
- National origin: Poland
- Manufacturer: WSK-PZL

History
- First flight: 20 April 1990

The PZL-126 Mrówka (ant) is a Polish agricultural aircraft first flown in 1990. It is a diminutive low-wing monoplane of conventional if stubby appearance with a cruciform tail, an enclosed cabin and fixed, tricycle undercarriage. Significant parts of the design were undertaken by students at the training college attached to the PZL plant at Okęcie under the direction of Andrzej Słocinski, with the whole project treated initially as a platform for design innovation. Initial design work was completed in 1982 and detail work the following year. Plans to fly a prototype by 1985 were delayed by revisions to the aircraft's equipment, although a mockup was displayed at an agricultural aviation exhibition at Olsztyn that August. Legislation to outlaw certain agricultural chemicals was under consideration in Poland in the late 1980s, spurring interest in biological agents as an alternative and making a tiny aircraft like the Mrówka feasible as a useful piece of agricultural equipment.

The prototype was eventually flown on 20 April 1990. After initial testing, the design was revised and the prototype rebuilt as the PZL-126P, flying in this configuration on 20 October 2000. Flight testing commenced in 2003 and was still underway in 2005.

== Specifications (as designed) ==
Data from Jane's All the World's Aircraft 1987–88

General characteristics

- Crew: 1
- Capacity: 25 L (6.6 US gal) spray pod on each wingtip, plus retractable dispenser reel for 3 kg (6 lb) of biological agents under fuselage.
- Length: 4.75 m (15 ft 7 in)
- Wingspan: 5.00 m (16 ft 5 in)
- Height: 2.53 m (8 ft 7 in)
- Empty weight: 230 kg (507 lb)
- Gross weight: 375 kg (827 lb)
- Powerplant: 1 × PZL-F 2A-120-C1 , 45 kW (60 hp)

Performance

- Cruise speed: 200 km/h (124 mph, 108 kn)
- Endurance: 6 hours
- Rate of climb: 3.1 m/s (610 ft/min)
