= Lockheed Little Dipper =

Model 33 Little Dipper
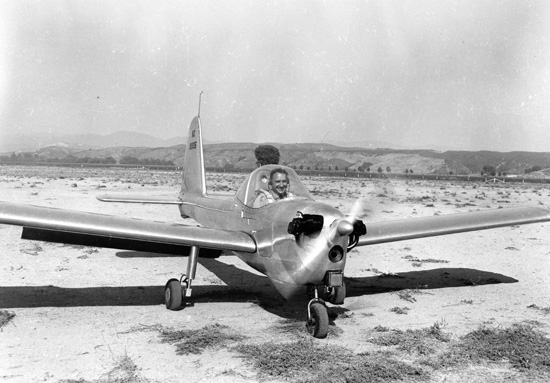

General information
- Type: Single-seat utility monoplane
- National origin: United States
- Manufacturer: Lockheed
- Designer: John Thorp
- Number built: 1

History
- First flight: August 1944
- Developed into: Thorp T-211

The Lockheed Model 33 Little Dipper, also known as Air Trooper, was an American single-seat monoplane, designed by John Thorp and built by Lockheed at Burbank, California. Flown in 1944 and offered to the Army as a "flying motorcycle", it was evaluated as a potential entry for Lockheed into the civilian market, but the program was cancelled before the second prototype was completed.

== Design and development ==
The design of the Model 33 originated with a private venture for a two-seat light aircraft by John Thorp, a Lockheed engineer. In April 1944, the company agreed to build the aircraft as the Lockheed Model 33. Due to wartime restrictions on materials, the company gained the interest of the United States Army in the aircraft as an "aerial flying motorcycle" to equip a "flying cavalry" under the name Air Trooper. The Army, willing to entertain the concept, authorized Lockheed to build two prototypes of the Model 33.

The Model 33 was of ordinary light-aircraft design, with a low-mounted cantilever monoplane wing and conventional empennage; powered by a 50 hp (37 kW) Franklin 2A4-49 engine, it was fitted with a fixed tricycle landing gear and proved to have STOL performance.

== Operational history ==
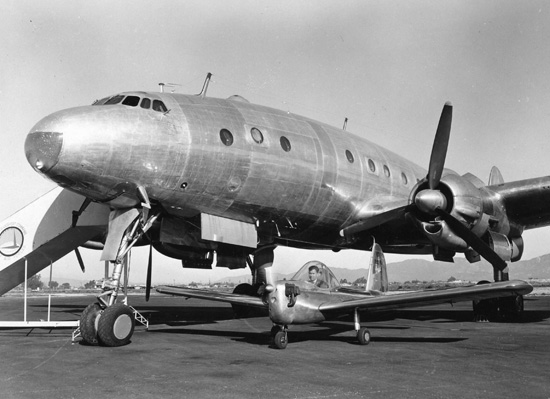
The Little Dipper with a Lockheed Constellation

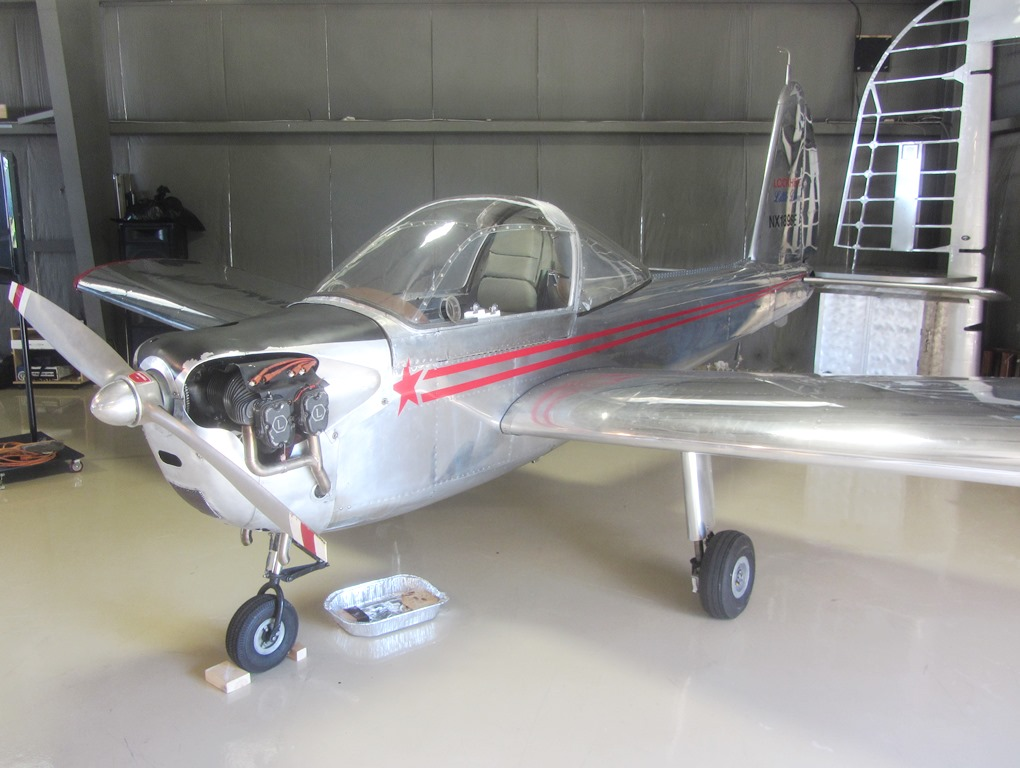
Little Dipper replica on display in 2015

The Model 33 prototype first flew in August 1944. The handling characteristics of the aircraft were considered satisfactory, but the Army had lost interest in the concept, despite the prototype demonstrating its performance by landing and taking off again in the courtyard of the Pentagon. Lockheed had intended to market the type as an inexpensive light aircraft on the civilian market as the Little Dipper; with the military interest having evaporated, the prototype and the partially completed second aircraft were scrapped in January 1947 for tax reasons.

Thorp, the aircraft's designer, would go on to develop the Thorp T-211 with lessons learned from the Little Dipper project.

== Specifications ==
Data from Francillion 1982

General characteristics

- Crew: One (pilot)
- Length: 17 ft 6 in (5.33 m)
- Wingspan: 25 ft 0 in (7.62 m)
- Height: 7 ft 0 in (2.13 m)
- Wing area: 104 sq ft (9.7 m^{2})
- Empty weight: 425 lb (193 kg)
- Gross weight: 725 lb (329 kg)
- Powerplant: 1 × Franklin 2A4-49 two-cylinder air-cooled horizontally opposed piston engine, 50 hp (37 kW)

Performance

- Maximum speed: 100 mph (161 km/h, 87 kn)
- Cruise speed: 91 mph (146 km/h, 79 kn)
- Range: 210 mi (340 km, 180 nmi)
- Service ceiling: 16,000 ft (4,900 m)
- Rate of climb: 900 ft/min (4.6 m/s)
- Takeoff run: 100 feet (30 m); with clearance of 50-foot (15 m) obstacle, 400 feet (120 m).

== See also ==
Aircraft of comparable role, configuration, and era

- Beecraft Wee Bee
- Mooney M-18 Mite
- Piper PA-8
- Ercoupe 415
