= Thulin NA =

1910s Swedish aircraft

Type NA
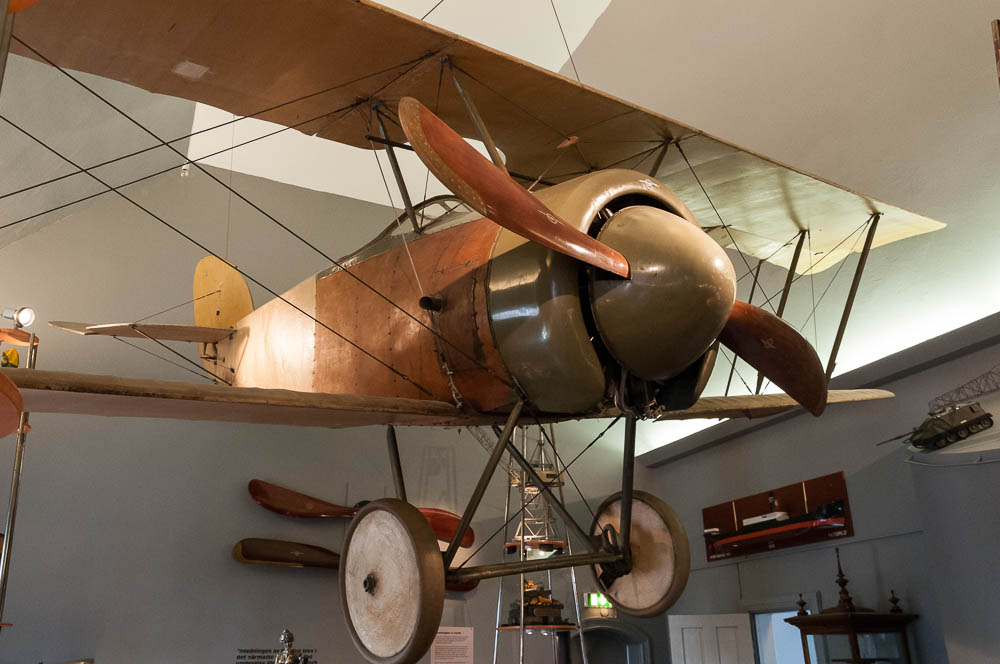

General information
- Type: Fighter aircraft
- National origin: Sweden
- Manufacturer: AB Thulinverken
- Designer: Enoch Thulin
- Number built: 1

History
- First flight: April 1919

The Thulin NA was a prototype Swedish fighter plane built in the late 1910s.

== Design and development ==
The Thulin NA was a two-seat biplane based on the Thulin N. Both the upper and lower wings were fitted with knuckles which were connected by a push rod. The fuselage was provided with an open cockpit where one was placed in a tandem location. The fuselage is made of a lattice construction of welded steel pipes . The wheel ground was fixed with a spur spring under the height knob.

The Type NA was the last aircraft built by AB Thulinverke. Although it first flew in April 1919, the poor market demand after WW1 meant that the Type NA did not enter production.

== Specifications ==
Data from

General characteristics

- Crew: 2
- Length: 5.8 m (19 ft 0 in)
- Wingspan: 8.1 m (26 ft 7 in)
- Height: 2.53 m (8 ft 4 in)
- Gross weight: 700 kg (1,543 lb)
- Powerplant: 1 × Thulin G 11-cylinder air-cooled rotary piston engine, 101 kW (135 hp)

Performance

- Maximum speed: 215 km/h (134 mph, 116 kn)

== See also ==
Related lists

- List of military aircraft of Sweden
