= Bristol Aquila =

1930s British piston aircraft engine

Aquila
- Type: Piston aircraft engine
- Manufacturer: Bristol Aeroplane Company
- First run: 1934
- Major applications: Bristol Bulldog; Bristol Bullpup

The Aquila was a nine-cylinder single-row radial aircraft engine designed by the Bristol Engine Company starting in 1934. A sleeve valve engine, its basic design was developed from the Bristol Perseus. The Aquila never entered production, but further developments led to the Bristol Hercules, Bristol Taurus, and Bristol Centaurus.

== Design and development ==
The Aquila was developed two years after the somewhat larger Perseus, both being sleeve valve designs. The primary difference was in size, the Perseus being based on the 5.75 by 6.5 in (146 by 165 mm) cylinder used in the Mercury engine, while the Aquila used a new and smaller 5 by 5.375 in (127.0 by 136.5 mm) sized cylinder. The result was a reduction in displacement from 1520 to 950 cubic inches (24.9 to 15.6 L).

The first Aquila engine delivered a modest 365 horsepower (272 kW), which was unspectacular for an engine of this size. It soon developed into more powerful versions as improvements were worked into the line (as well as similar changes to the Perseus), and by 1936 it had improved to 500 hp (370 kW). This would have made it an excellent replacement for the Bristol Jupiter, which ended production at 590 hp (440 kW) three years earlier, but by this time almost all interest was on ever-larger engines.

== Applications ==
Note:

- Bristol Bulldog
- Bristol Bullpup
- Bristol Type 143
- Vickers Venom

== Specifications (Aquila I) ==
Data from Lumsden.

=== General characteristics ===
- Type: Nine-cylinder single-row naturally aspirated air-cooled radial engine
- Bore: 5 in (127 mm)
- Stroke: 5.375 in (136.5 mm)
- Displacement: 950 cu in (15.6 L)
- Length: 41 in (1,000 mm)
- Diameter: 46 in (1,200 mm)
- Dry weight: 776 pounds (352 kg)

=== Components ===
- Valvetrain: Sleeve valve
- Supercharger: Medium supercharged
- Fuel system: Claudel-Hobson carburettor
- Fuel type: 73 octane rating petrol
- Cooling system: Air-cooled
- Reduction gear: 0.5:1 turning a Hamilton Standard variable pitch propeller

=== Performance ===
- Power output: 493 hp (368 kW) at 2,600 rpm for takeoff
- Specific power: 0.52 hp/in^{3} (23.59 kW/L)
- Compression ratio: 7.3:1
- Specific fuel consumption: 0.46 lb/(hp•h) (282 g/(kW•h))
- Oil consumption: 0.21 oz/(hp•h) (8g /(kW•h))
- Power-to-weight ratio: 0.64 hp/lb (1.05 kW/kg)

== See also ==
Related development

- Bristol Taurus

Related lists

- List of aircraft engines
