= Hawker F.20/27 =

F.20/27
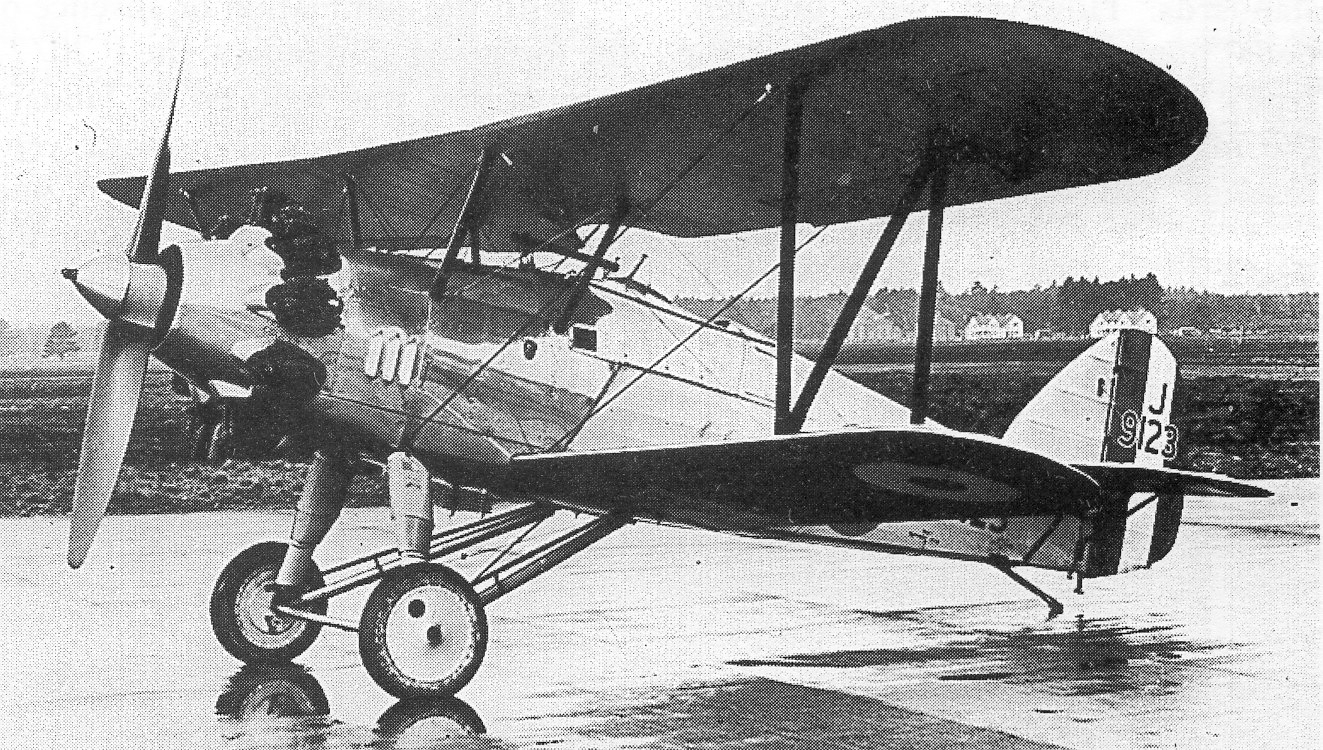
- F.20/27 with Mercury VI engine

General information
- Type: Interceptor fighter
- National origin: United Kingdom
- Manufacturer: H.G.Hawker Engineering Co. Ltd.
- Number built: 1

History
- First flight: August 1928
- Variant: Hawker Fury

The Hawker F.20/27 was a British fighter design built to an Air Ministry specification for an interceptor in the late 1920s. It was a single-seat biplane powered by a radial engine; the very similar but V-12-engined Hawker Fury development proved superior and only one F.20/27 was built.

== Design and development ==
The Hawker F.20/27 design was tendered to the Air Ministry in November 1927 in response to Air Ministry Specification F.20/27 for an interceptor fighter. A prototype was ordered for comparison with those of other manufacturers including the Armstrong Whitworth Starling II, Bristol Bullpup, de Havilland DH.77, Fairey Firefly II, Saunders A.10, Vickers Jockey and the Westland Interceptor. In the end there were no contracts awarded and the specification was withdrawn, but Hawker's radial-engined contender led directly to the very successful Fury powered by a liquid-cooled engine.

The F.20/27, sometimes referred to as the Interceptor, was a clean single-engined, single-seat and single-bay biplane, fabric-covered over a metal frame. The unequal span wings had parallel chord and no sweep, but were heavily staggered. Ailerons were carried on the upper wings, and only the lower planes had dihedral. The interplane struts leaned strongly outwards. The tail was conventional with the tailplane braced from below; both it and the fin carried unbalanced control surfaces.

The upper fuselage was slightly humped, with the pilot sitting in an open cockpit just behind the upper wing, which had a small rounded cutout to improve visibility. A single-axle fixed main undercarriage had its main legs sloping slightly aft from the fuselage and braced back from the axle to the lower wing rear spar roots. A tailskid was fitted.

This description could almost describe the Fury as well as the F.20/27 as the two aircraft were very similar. There were small differences however: for example the leading edge of the tailplane was straighter in the Fury and it had horn-balanced elevators. The Fury also had a greater interplane gap; because of the stagger this put the upper wing further forward and removed the need for the pilot's cutout. By far the most important difference both visually and aerodynamically was the engine installation, as the F.20/27 had a radial motor, initially the 450 hp (336 kW) nine-cylinder Bristol Jupiter. This was mounted in a slender nose but with much of the cylinders exposed for cooling, in contrast to the smooth contours of the Fury's V-12 installation. The latter did require a radiator, with a drag penalty but not, it turned out, as great a penalty as that paid by the radial installation.

The F.20/27 first flew in August 1928 and shortly after went to RAF Martlesham Heath for tests. It returned to Hawker's in May 1930 where it was re-engined with a 520 hp (388 kW) Bristol Mercury VI and the addition of a Townend ring was considered; but by now the superior performance of the Fury, about 10% faster despite very similar dimensions, shape and power-to-weight ratio showed that the efficiently cowled and low frontal area liquid-cooled engine was the way forward for interceptors.

== Specifications (with Mercury VI) ==
Data from

General characteristics

- Crew: 1
- Length: 23 ft 6 1/2 in (7.176 m)
- Wingspan: 30 ft 0 in (9.14 m)
- Height: 9 ft 5 in (2.87 m)
- Wing area: 228 sq ft (21.2 m^{2})
- Empty weight: 2,155 lb (977 kg)
- Gross weight: 3,150 lb (1,429 kg)
- Fuel capacity: 55 imp gal (66 US gal; 250 L)
- Powerplant: 1 × Bristol Mercury VI 9-cylinder single-row radial engine, 520 hp (390 kW)

Performance

- Maximum speed: 202 mph (325 km/h, 176 kn) at 10,000 ft (3,000 m)
- Endurance: 3 hr 10 min
- Service ceiling: 24,800 ft (7,600 m)
- Time to altitude: 5 min 5 s to 10,000 ft (3,000 m)

Armament

- Guns: 2 × 0.303 in (7.7 mm) fixed forward firing Vickers machine guns on forward fuselage

== See also ==
Related development

- Hawker Fury

Aircraft of comparable role, configuration, and era

- Armstrong Whitworth Starling II
- Bristol Bullpup
- de Havilland DH.77
- Fairey Firefly II
- Saunders A.10
- Vickers Jockey
- Westland Interceptor.
