= Westland Interceptor =

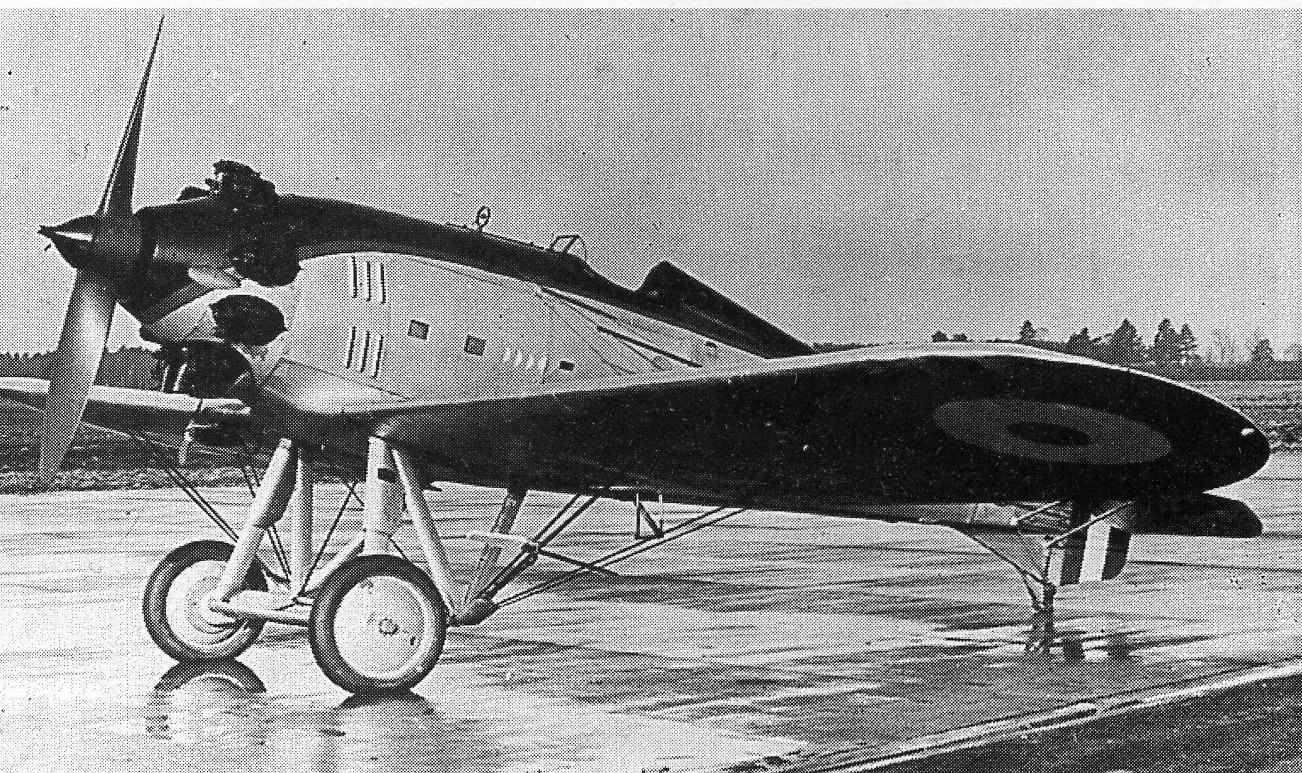

General information
- Type: Fighter
- National origin: United Kingdom
- Manufacturer: Westland Aircraft
- Designer: W.E.W. Petter
- Status: Retired
- Number built: 1

History
- First flight: 1929

The Westland Interceptor was a fighter developed by the British company Westland Aircraft to Air Ministry Specification F.20/27. When tested in 1929 and 1930, it showed unsatisfactory handling characteristics and was rejected by the RAF in favour of the Hawker Fury biplane fighter.

== Development ==
Specification F.20/27 was for a fighter operating in the daylight interception role. The main requirement was that the F.20/27 fighter would be able to overtake, in the shortest possible time, an enemy aircraft passing overhead at 150 mph (240 km/h) at an altitude of 20,000 feet (6,100 metres). This put the emphasis on high speed and rate of climb.

Design work on the Interceptor started in late 1927, and it made its first flight in early 1929, with Lieutenant L. G. Paget at the controls. The Interceptor was a low-wing monoplane with an all-metal structure and wire-braced wings, covered mostly in fabric with the exception of the front fuselage. It had a fixed undercarriage. The single prototype was powered by an uncowled Bristol Mercury IIA, later replaced by a Mercury III. It was armed with two .303-inch (7.7-mm) Vickers Mk.II machine guns, installed in the sides of the fuselage with the breeches within reach of the pilot. The guns were synchronized to fire through the propeller, and heated to improve their operation at high altitude. The RAF had intended to call for four-gun armament in Specification F.20/27, but after an administrative mix-up it was sent out to manufacturers calling for only two guns.

The handling characteristics of the Interceptor have been described as "alarming." In steep turns the elevator became ineffective, and the aircraft was prone to enter a spiral dive or a spin from such flight attitudes. The Mercury II engine suffered from persistent high oil temperatures. Test pilots gave a negative assessment of the Interceptor, causing it to be withdrawn from the F.20/27 competition.

The aircraft continued to fly until 1935, but no orders were placed. Significant aerodynamic modifications were made to improve the handling characteristics, including a considerable increase in the height of the fin and rudder, to improve spin recovery. The troublesome Mercury engine was exchanged for a Bristol Jupiter VII, and later fitted with a Townend ring to reduce drag.

The Interceptor and two of the competing F.20/27 designs, the Vickers Jockey and de Havilland DH.77, were historically important because they were monoplane fighter prototypes, after a long period during which the standard fighter design was a biplane. However, all three were found lacking in overall performance and handling during the test flights, showing that the aircraft designers had failed to reach the project goal. The F.20/27 competition was won by the Hornet, which entered service under the name Hawker Fury.

== Specifications ==
Data from Airwar.

General characteristics

- Length: 25 ft 4 in (7.72 m)
- Wingspan: 38 ft 0 in (11.58 m)
- Height: 9 ft 8 in (2.95 m)
- Wing area: 214 sq ft (19.9 m^{2})
- Empty weight: 2,350 lb (1,066 kg)
- Max takeoff weight: 3,325 lb (1,508 kg)
- Powerplant: 1 × Bristol Mercury IIA 9-cylinder air-cooled radial piston engine, 440 hp (330 kW)
- Propellers: 2-bladed fixed-pitch propeller

Performance

- Maximum speed: 192 mph (309 km/h, 167 kn)
- Cruise speed: 164 mph (264 km/h, 143 kn)
- Range: 385 mi (620 km, 335 nmi)

Armament

- Guns: 2x fixed forward firing .303 in (7.7 mm) Vickers machine guns

== See also ==
Aircraft of comparable role, configuration, and era

- Armstrong Whitworth Starling II
- Bristol Bulldog Mk.II
- de Havilland DH.77
- Fairey Firefly II
- Hawker Fury
- Saunders A.10
- Vickers Jockey

Related lists

- List of Air Ministry specifications
