= Bristol Perseus =

1930s British piston aircraft engine

Perseus
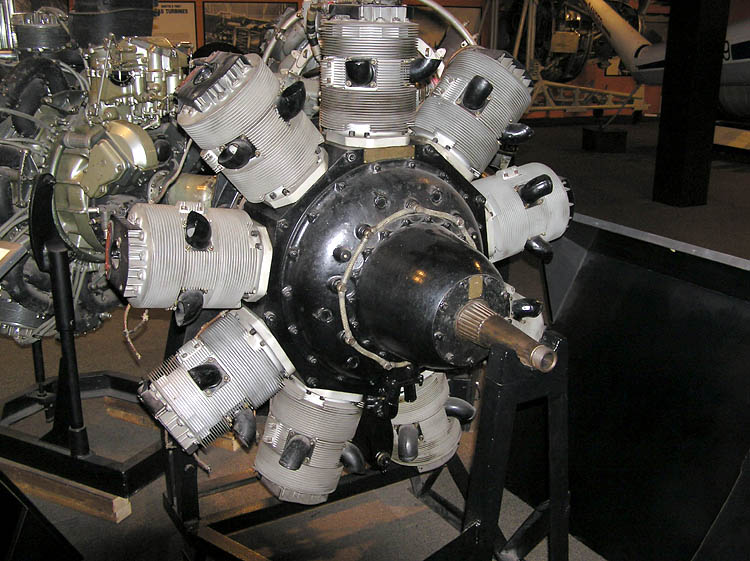
- Preserved Bristol Perseus
- Type: Piston aircraft engine
- Manufacturer: Bristol Aeroplane Company
- First run: 1932
- Major applications: Westland Lysander; Blackburn Skua
- Number built: c.8,000
- Developed into: Bristol Hercules

The Bristol Perseus was a British nine-cylinder, single-row, air-cooled radial aircraft engine produced by the Bristol Engine Company starting in 1932. It was the first production sleeve valve aero engine.

== Design and development ==
In late 1925 and early 1926, the Royal Aircraft Establishment (RAE) published a series of papers by Harry Ricardo on the sleeve valve principle. The main advantages over the traditional poppet valves was better volumetric efficiency and the ability to operate at higher rotational speeds. This allowed a smaller engine to produce the same power as a larger one, leading to better fuel efficiency and compact design, particularly in multi-row radial engines.

Roy Fedden, Bristol's primary engine designer, became interested in the concept and by 1927 he had constructed a working two-cylinder V as a test bed, with the idea of developing it into a V-12. Problems cropped up on the design, notably the sleeves bursting during the power stroke and stripping their driving gears. A long series of tests and materials changes and improvements required six years and an estimated £2 million to cure. By 1933, the problems had been worked out and the Perseus went on to become the first sleeve valve aero-engine in the world, to be put into large quantity production.

The result was a Bristol Mercury-sized engine adapted to the sleeve valve system, the Perseus, and its smaller cousin, the Bristol Aquila. The first production versions of the Perseus were rated at 580 horsepower (433 kW), the same as the Mercury model for that year, which shows that the sleeve system was being underexploited. The engine was quickly uprated as improvements were introduced and by 1936 the Perseus was delivering 810 hp (604 kW), eventually topping out at 930 hp (690 kW) in 1939, while the Perseus 100 with an increased capacity of 1,635 cu in (26.8 L), produced 1,200 hp (890 kW) at 2,700 rpm at 4,250 ft (1,296 m). This far outperformed even the most developed versions of the Mercury.

The Perseus saw limited use in the civilian field, notably on the Short Empire flying-boats but was more common in the expanding military field, where it was found on the Westland Lysander reconnaissance aircraft and the Vickers Vildebeest, Blackburn Botha, Skua and Roc bombers.

The main contribution of the Perseus is that its design was used as the basic piston and cylinder for two "twinned" (double-row) types: the tremendously successful Bristol Hercules and Bristol Centaurus engines. It was in these designs that the advantages of the sleeve valve were finally put to good use and by war's end, the Centaurus was one of the most powerful engines in the world.

== Applications ==
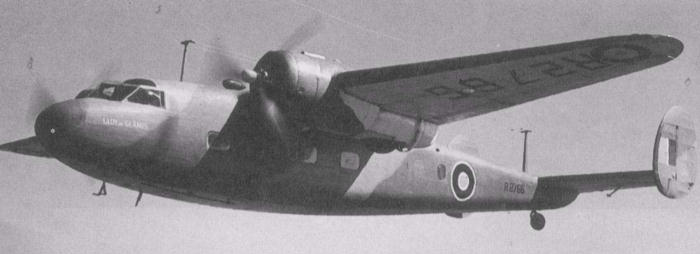
Bristol Perseus powered de Havilland Flamingo

Note:

- Blackburn Botha
- Blackburn Roc
- Blackburn Skua
- Bristol Bulldog
- Bristol Type 148
- Cunliffe-Owen Flying Wing
- de Havilland Flamingo
- de Havilland Hertfordshire
- Gloster Goring
- Hawker Hart
- Saro A.33
- Short Empire
- Short Scylla
- Vickers Vellox
- Vickers Vildebeest Mk.IV
- Westland Lysander Mk.II

== Specifications (Perseus XII) ==
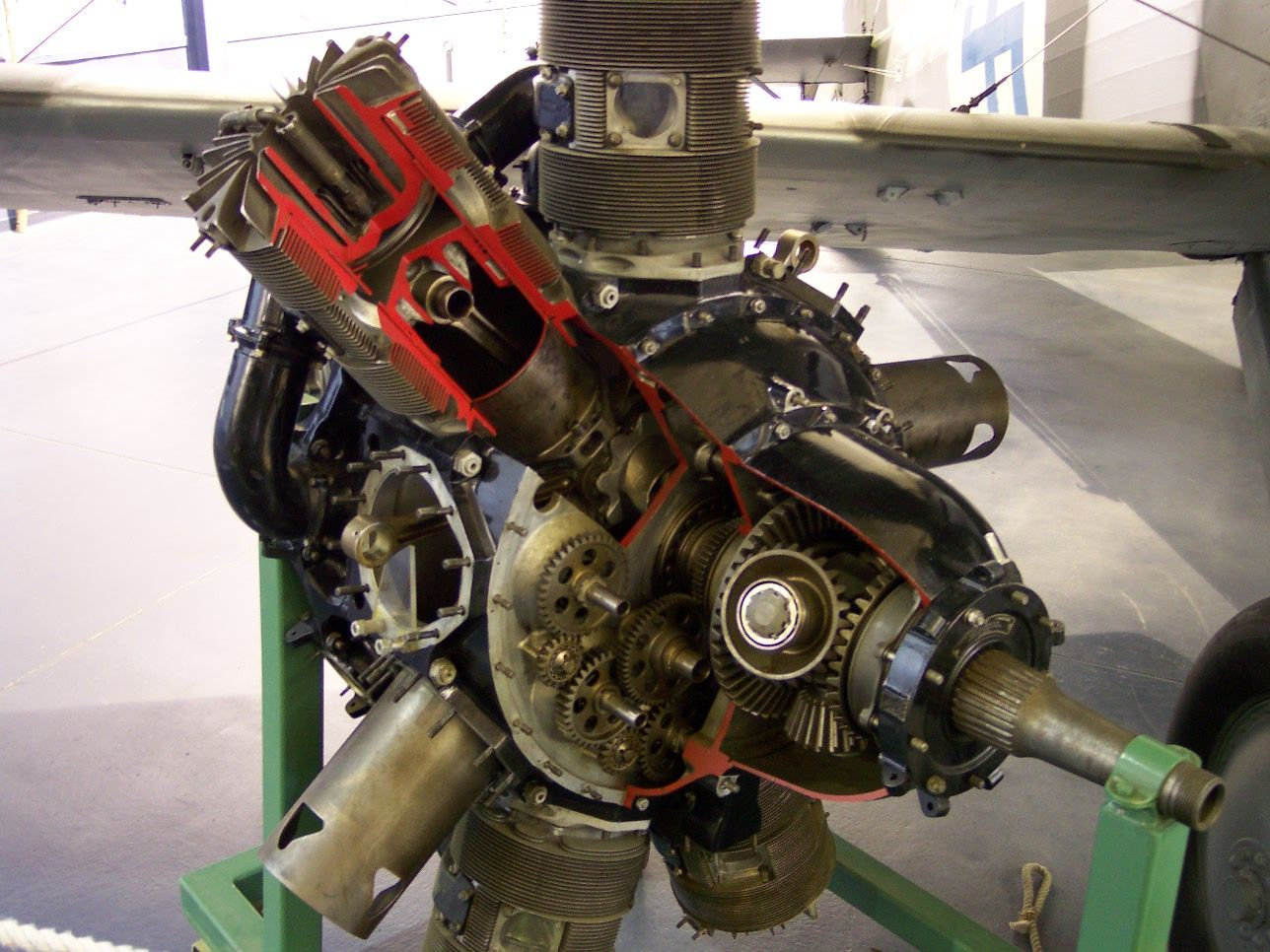
Cutaway Bristol Perseus showing sleeve valves and reduction gears

Data from Lumsden.

=== General characteristics ===
- Type: Nine-cylinder single-row supercharged air-cooled radial engine
- Bore: 5.75 in (146 mm)
- Stroke: 6.5 in (165 mm)
- Displacement: 1,520 in^{3} (24.9 L)
- Length: 49 in (1,245 mm)
- Diameter: 55.3 in (1,405 mm)
- Dry weight: 1,025 lb (465 kg)

=== Components ===
- Valvetrain: Sleeve valve
- Supercharger: Single-speed centrifugal type supercharger
- Fuel system: Claudel-Hobson carburettor
- Fuel type: 87 Octane petrol
- Cooling system: Air-cooled
- Reduction gear: 0.5:1 turning a de Havilland variable pitch propeller

=== Performance ===
- Power output: * 830 hp (619 kW) at 2,650 rpm for takeoff
- 905 hp (675 kW) at 2,750 rpm at 6,500 ft (1,980 m)
- Specific power: 0.59 hp/in³ (26.75 kW/L)
- Compression ratio: 6.75:1
- Specific fuel consumption: 0.43 lb/(hp·h) (261 g/(kW·h))
- Oil consumption: 0.28 oz/(hp·h) (11 g/(kW·h))
- Power-to-weight ratio: 0.88 hp/lb (1.45 kW/kg)

== See also ==
Related development

- Bristol Hercules
- Bristol Centaurus

Related lists

- List of aircraft engines
