= Blackburn Botha =

1938 reconnaissance aircraft series

B.26 Botha
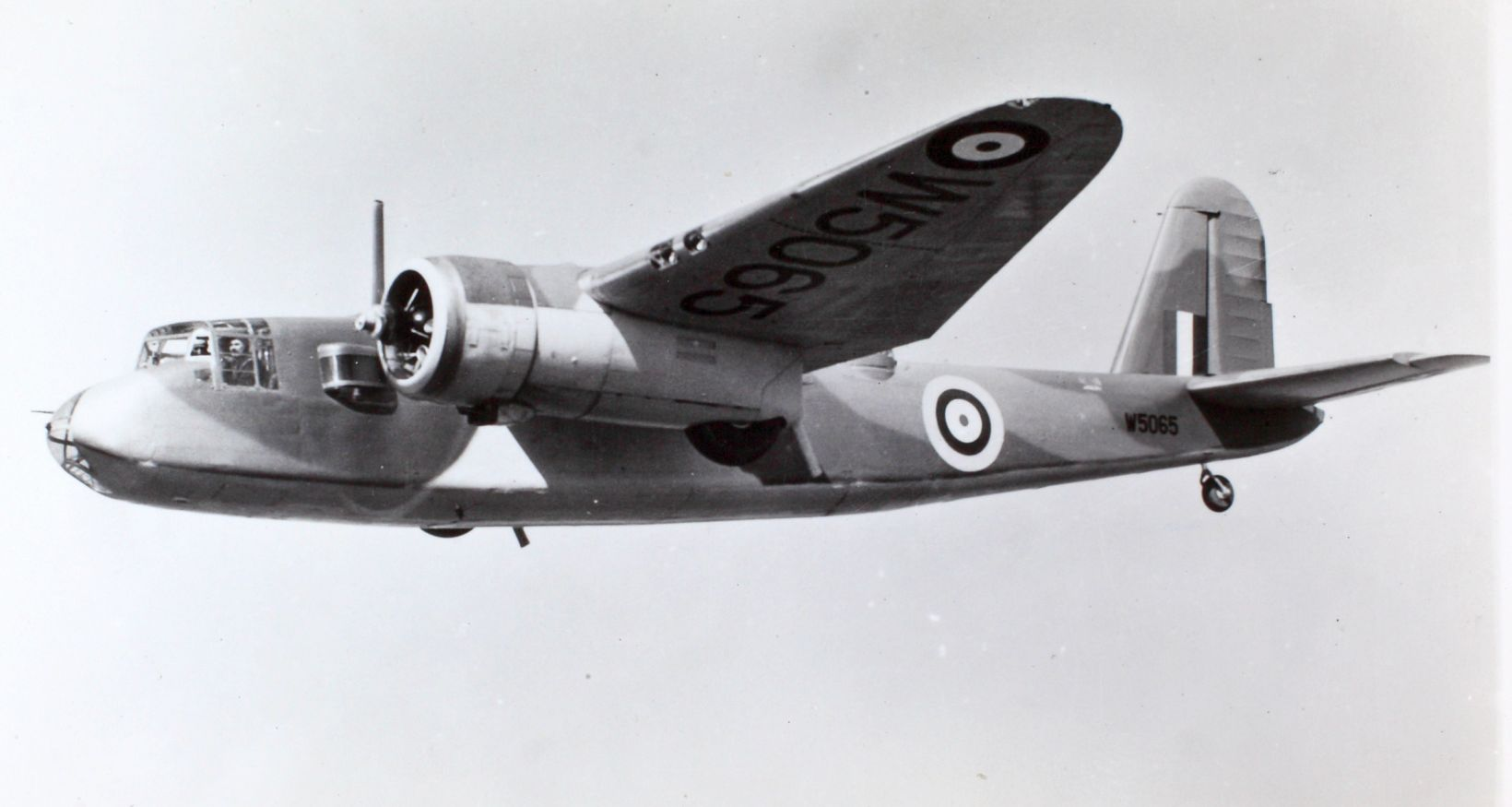
- Blackburn B.26 Botha

General information
- Type: Torpedo bomber
- Manufacturer: Blackburn Aircraft
- Primary user: Royal Air Force
- Number built: 580

History
- Introduction date: 12 December 1939
- First flight: 28 December 1938
- Retired: September 1944

The Blackburn B.26 Botha was a four-seat reconnaissance and torpedo bomber. It was produced by the British aviation company Blackburn Aircraft at its factories at Brough and Dumbarton.

The Botha was developed during the mid 1930s in response to Air Ministry Specification M.15/35, and was ordered straight off the drawing board alongside the competing Bristol Beaufort. On 28 December 1938, the first production aircraft made the type's maiden flight; almost exactly one year later, it entered service with the RAF. During official evaluation testing of the Botha, stability issues were revealed, as well as the fact that it was underpowered. It was only briefly used in frontline operations before being withdrawn to secondary roles during 1941. It continued to be flown in these roles, largely being used for training and as a target tug, before being fully withdrawn in September 1944.

== Development ==
During September 1935, the British Air Ministry issued specification M.15/35, which called for a new reconnaissance/torpedo bomber to reequip RAF Coastal Command. Among the stipulations set out were a twin-engined arrangement, a crew of three, and the provision of internal stowage to accommodate a single torpedo. Blackburn opted to produce a design to meet this requirement. During early 1936, two submissions that fulfilled this requirement were accepted, one being Blackburn's and the other being the Type 152 from Bristol. The Blackburn design would receive the name Botha after General Botha, while the rival Type 152 would be named Beaufort after the Duke of Beaufort.

Both of the proposed aircraft were originally intended to be powered by the Bristol Perseus radial engine, capable of producing 850 hp (634 kW). At a late stage, the Air Ministry decided to revise the specification and re-issue it as M.10/36; the principal change was that the aircraft was abruptly required to accommodate a crew of four, along with an enlarged fuselage that increased the aircraft's overall weight. It was also intended that this change would allow the successful design to be ordered straight from the drawing board. A consequence of the weight increase was that both designs suddenly required more power to be able to achieve their envisioned performance; however, while the Taurus, capable of producing up to 1,130 hp (840 kW), was provided for the Beaufort, the Botha only received the Perseus X, capable of up to 880 hp (660 kW), due to limited supplies of the Taurus engine.

Early on, Blackburn made several proposals to address the engine shortfall; the adoption of the large Bristol Hercules radial engine was the main element of the proposed Botha II, however, it was not pursued. During December 1936, the Air Ministry ordered 442 Bothas, it placed orders for the competing Beaufort as well. Immediately upon receipt of the order, Blackburn set about establishing two production lines for the Botha at its main factory at Brough and its new facility in Dumbarton, Scotland; additional component manufacturing was performed at the Olympia works in Leeds.

On 28 December 1938, the first flight of the Botha took place at Brough, piloted by H. Bailey. This was the first production aircraft, since there was no prototypes as such. On 25 March 1939 it was delivered to RAF Martlesham Heath for performance and handling trials by the Aeroplane and Armament Experimental Establishment (A&AEE). The first production aircraft was found to have inadequate elevator control; this was rectified on a second aircraft sent for trials by a slight increase in the tailplane area and a larger horn-balanced elevator.

A total of 380 aircraft were produced at Brough, while another 200 Bothas were constructed at Dumbarton for a total of 580. Peak production was attained in June 1940, during that month alone the two sites produced 58 aircraft. Limited modifications were implemented during the production run, such as the addition of a jettisonable main entrance door, non-retractable bulged navigator windows, new flap jacks, and an improved undercarriage retraction mechanism; several proposed changes, such as larger propellers and flame dampers, were not implemented.

== Design ==
In basic configuration, the Blackburn Botha was a twin-engined cantilever monoplane; the high-mounted wing was a deliberate design decision, intended to provide the best possible downward view for its crew. The pilot, seated in a relatively spacious and well-instrumented cabin at the front of the aircraft, had an exceptionally unobstructed forward-facing field of view, although the rearwards view was restricted by the position of the engines. The navigator and wireless operator's positions were within a separate central cabin reached via an entrance door with a built-in stepladder on the starboard side of the fuselage. Crew members could move between their positions via a narrow gangway; the observer had to use this passage to reach the prone bombing position in the aircraft's nose. The final crew member, the gunner, was positioned to the rear of the wing in an egg-shaped power-assisted turret on the upper fuselage.

The forward fuselage was reminiscent of the Blackburn Skua, and had a flush-riveted Alclad plated covering, while the rear portion of the fuselage was a metal skin over a tubular metal structure. Flight surfaces such as the rudder, elevator, and ailerons had fabric coverings. The centre section of the wing housed the three main fuel tanks, with a normal combined maximum capacity of 435.75 gallons; this could be increased to 565.75 gallons for special operations. Fuel tank selection was by a panel behind the cockpit, out of reach of the pilot, and where it was possible to accidentally select all tanks off, leading to engine failure a few minutes into the flight. This panel could not be reached by the pilot, and such a fuel starvation problem could not be cured in flight, when flown by a single ferry pilot. Hydraulically-actuated split flaps were present on the central section of the wing's trailing edge, while balanced ailerons were fitted on the sharply-tapered outer wing panels. The fin and tailplane were unbraced cantilevers with stressed-skin construction.

The undercarriage consisted of two oleo-pneumatic legs that retracted rearwards into the nacelles, which were fitted with spring-loaded doors; hand-operated hydraulic brakes were fitted. As built, the Botha I was powered by a pair of Bristol Perseus X radial engines, each driving a de Havilland Type 5/11 Hydromatic three-bladed constant-speed propeller. The engines, mounted on the central section of the wing in wide-chord cowlings, were fitted with controllable cooling grills. A special cell in the fuselage could accommodate a single torpedo, a single 500lb bomb, or two 250lb bombs; additional bombs could be carried on external bomb racks on the mainplane. Other armaments included the pilot's forward-firing .303-inch Vickers machine gun and the twin Lewis guns installed in the turret. Comprehensive marine gear, including a collapsible dinghy, was also provided.

== Operational history ==
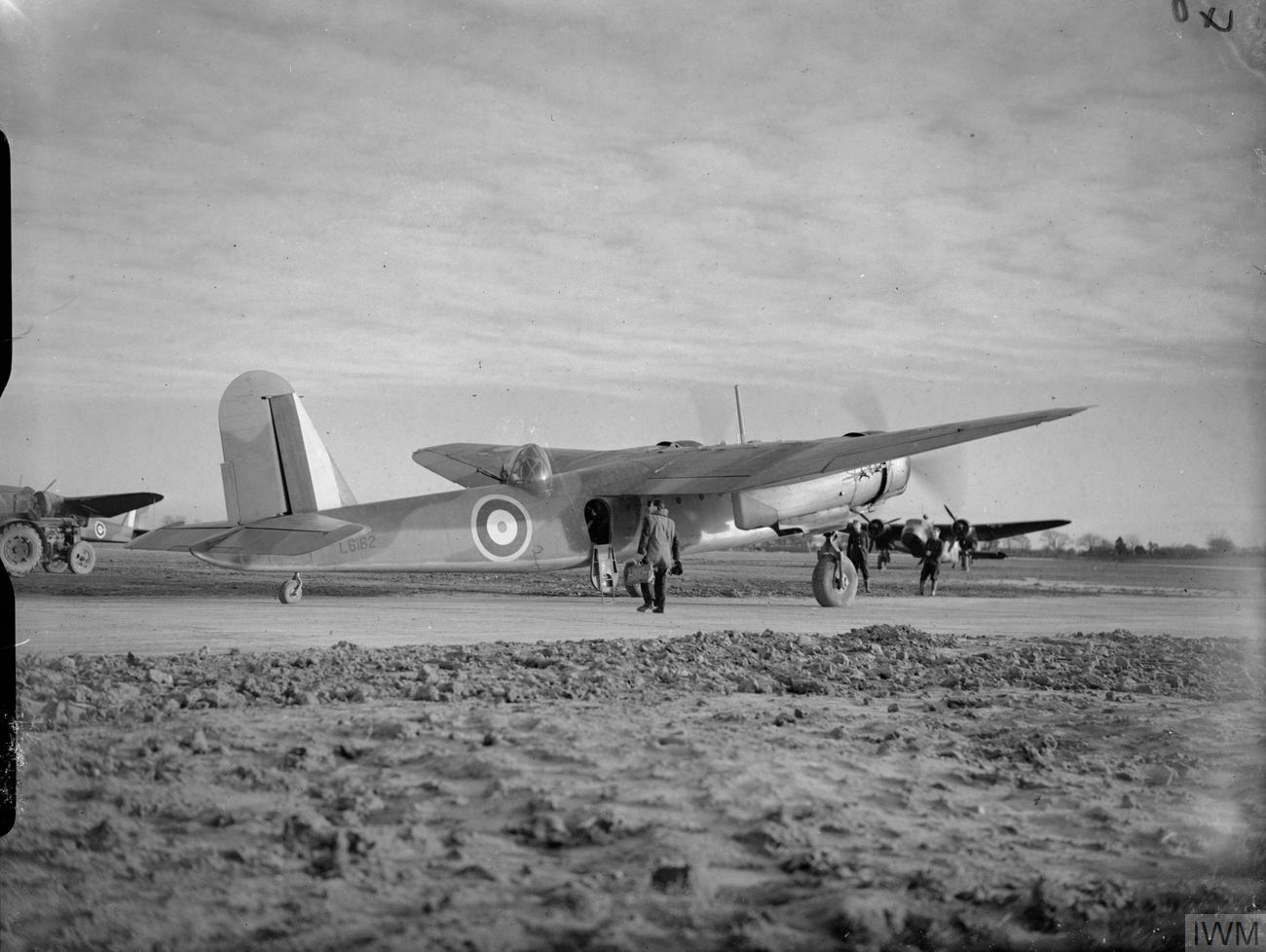
Botha of No. 1 (Coastal) Operational Training Unit, preparing for departure on a training flight at Silloth, Cumberland

The RAF's first Botha was delivered to No. 5 Maintenance Unit at RAF Kemble, Gloucestershire on 12 December 1939. Service testing of the Botha was marred by a series of accidents, although no common cause was ever discovered according to the aviation author Aubrey Joseph Jackson; nor did he consider the loss rate to be excessive for the era. However, the aircraft was commonly considered to be somewhat underpowered.

According to aviation author Roger Haywood, concerns were raised regarding its poor lateral stability, while the crew's view to the side or rearward was virtually non-existent owing to the positioning of the engines, the poor view making the aircraft "useless as a GR [General Reconnaissance] aircraft". Although the Botha passed torpedo and mine-dropping tests, the aircraft's poor general performance resulted in the decision in April 1940 to issue the Botha only to four general reconnaissance squadrons equipped with the Avro Anson, rather than the torpedo bomber squadrons previously planned.

During June 1940, the Botha entered squadron service with No. 608 Squadron and began conducting convoy escort duties two months later. This was the only squadron to fly the type operationally. While flying these patrols, the typical bomb load carried was three 100 lb (50 kg) anti-submarine bombs plus two 250 lb (110 kg) general-purpose bombs. According to Jackson, operational need for aircraft such as the Botha had greatly diminished following the Fall of France that year.

Efforts aimed at addressing some of the aircraft's shortcomings led to both the airframe and engines being subject to further development work. However, the Air Staff decided to withdraw the Botha from frontline service and transfer the surviving aircraft to secondary duties. Accordingly, numerous training units received the type; at one point in 1941, one unit had over a hundred Bothas on its inventory. However, the combination of inexperienced pilots and its unfavourable flight characteristics resulted in further casualties. Some Bothas were converted to target tugs, these aircraft being redesignated as TT Mk.I. In August 1943, the type was officially declared obsolete, with many aircraft being broken up either on site or after their return to Blackburn. During September 1944, the Botha was fully retired from RAF service.

== Variants ==
- Botha Mk I : Four-seat reconnaissance, torpedo bomber aircraft.
- Botha TT Mk I : Target tug aircraft.

== Operators ==
Poland

- Polish Air Force
  - No. 301 Polish Bomber Squadron
  - No. 304 Polish Bomber Squadron

United Kingdom

- Royal Air Force
  - No. 3 School of General Reconnaissance
  - No. 24 Squadron
  - No. 502 Squadron
  - No. 608 Squadron

== Specifications (Botha Mk.I - Perseus XA) ==
Orthographic projection of the Botha, with inset detail showing the asymmetrical nose glazing.

Data from Blackburn aircraft since 1909, The Hamlyn Concise Guide to British Aircraft of World War II

General characteristics

- Crew: 4
- Length: 51 ft 0.5 in (15.558 m)
- Wingspan: 59 ft 0 in (17.98 m)
- Height: 14 ft 7.5 in (4.458 m)
- Wing area: 518 sq ft (48.1 m^{2})
- Empty weight: 12,036 lb (5,459 kg)
- Gross weight: 18,450 lb (8,369 kg)
- Fuel capacity: 435.75 imp gal (523 US gal; 1,981 L) normal fuel in three wing tanks and a distributor/collector tank, with 565.75 imp gal (679 US gal; 2,572 L) available for special operations.
- Powerplant: 2 × Bristol Perseus XA nine-cylinder air-cooled radial piston engines, 930 hp (690 kW) each
- Propellers: 3-bladed de Havilland Hydromatic Type 5/11 constant-speed propellers

Performance

- Maximum speed: 209 mph (336 km/h, 182 kn) at sea level

220 mph (191 kn; 354 km/h) at 15,000 ft (4,572 m)

- Cruise speed: 212 mph (341 km/h, 184 kn)
- Stall speed: 75 mph (121 km/h, 65 kn) with flaps and undercarriage down
- Range: 1,270 mi (2,040 km, 1,100 nmi)
- Service ceiling: 18,400 ft (5,600 m)
- Absolute ceiling: 19,700 ft (6,005 m)
- Rate of climb: 985 ft/min (5.00 m/s) initial

355 ft/min (1.80 m/s) at 15,000 ft (4,572 m)

Armament

- Guns: Three × 0.303 in (7.7 mm) machine guns (one fixed forward-firing, two in dorsal turret)
- Bombs: internal torpedo, depth charges or bombs up to 2,000 lb (907 kg)

== See also ==
Aircraft of comparable role, configuration, and era

- Bristol Beaufort

Related lists

- List of aircraft of World War II
- List of aircraft of the RAF
- List of bomber aircraft
