= Bristol Taurus =

1930s British piston aircraft engine

Taurus
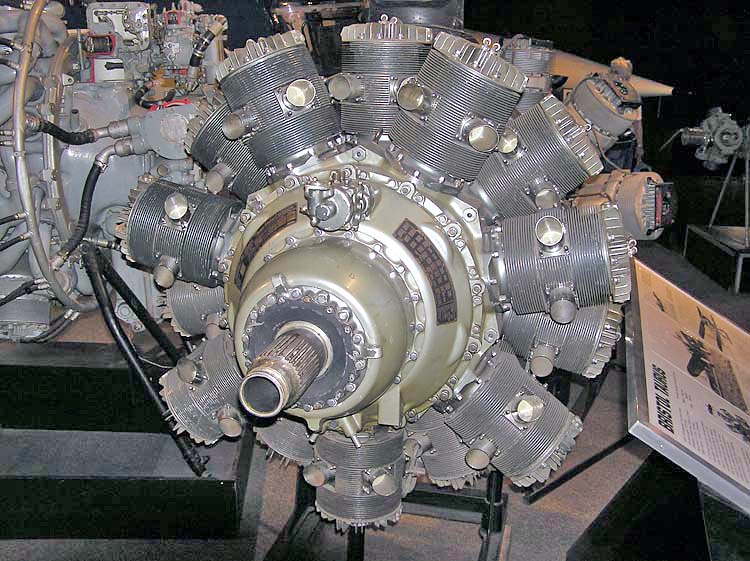
- Preserved Bristol Taurus
- Type: Piston aircraft engine
- Manufacturer: Bristol Aeroplane Company
- First run: November 1936
- Major applications: Fairey Albacore; Bristol Beaufort
- Developed from: Bristol Aquila

The Taurus is a British 14-cylinder two-row radial aircraft engine, produced by the Bristol Engine Company starting in 1936. The Taurus was developed by adding cylinders to the existing single-row Aquila design and transforming it into a twin-row radial engine, creating a powerplant that produced just over 1,000 horsepower (750 kilowatts) with very low weight.

== Design and development ==
Bristol had originally intended to use the Aquila and Perseus as two of its major product lines in the 1930s, but the rapid increase in size and speed of aircraft in the 1930s demanded much larger engines. The mechanicals from both of these designs were then put into two-row configurations to develop much larger engines, the Aquila becoming the Taurus, and the Perseus becoming the Hercules.

The Taurus used sleeve valves, resulting in an uncluttered exterior and little mechanical noise. It offered high power with a relatively low weight, starting from 1,015 hp (757 kW) in the earliest versions. It was also compact, with a diameter of 46 in (1,200 mm) which made it attractive for fighters. Unfortunately, the engine was also described as "notoriously troublesome", with protracted development and a slow growth in rated power. After several years of development, power had only increased from 1,015 hp (757 kW) to 1,130 hp (840 kW). As the most important applications of this engine was in aircraft that flew at low altitude, development efforts focused on low-altitude performance.

The first Taurus engines were delivered just before World War II, and was used primarily in the Fairey Albacore and Bristol's Beaufort. In April 1940, a suggestion was made to replace the Taurus engines of the latter with the Pratt & Whitney R-1830 Twin Wasp, which had a slightly larger 48 in (1,200 mm) diameter, but this change was postponed to the autumn of 1941 while attempts were made to cure the Taurus's reliability problems, and later had to be temporarily reversed because of shortages of Twin Wasps. The Twin Wasp was, however, strongly preferred, especially for overseas postings, because of its better reliability. The reliability problems were mostly cured in later models of the Taurus engine by a change in the cylinder manufacturing process, although the engine reputation never recovered, and in the Albacore the Taurus engine was used until the end of that aircraft's production in 1943.

There were no other operational applications of the Taurus engine, because its initial reliability problems discouraged development of Taurus-powered aircraft, and because later-war combat aircraft demanded more powerful engines. Production ended in favour of the Hercules engine.

== Variants ==
- Taurus II (1940) – 1,140 bhp (850 kW) maximum power with 4.25 psi (29.3 kPa) boost at 3,225 rpm for take off or one minute using 87 octane fuel. Medium supercharged.
- Taurus III – 935 hp (697 kW) maximum continuous power, medium supercharged, compression ratio 7.2:1.
- Taurus VI – 985 hp (735 kW) maximum continuous power, medium supercharged, compression ratio 7.2:1.
- Taurus XII (1940) – 985 hp (735 kW) maximum continuous power, medium supercharged, compression ratio 7.2:1.
- Taurus XVI (1940) – 985 hp (735 kW) maximum continuous power, medium supercharged, compression ratio 7.2:1.
- Taurus XX – trials engine only, one built.

== Applications ==
Note:

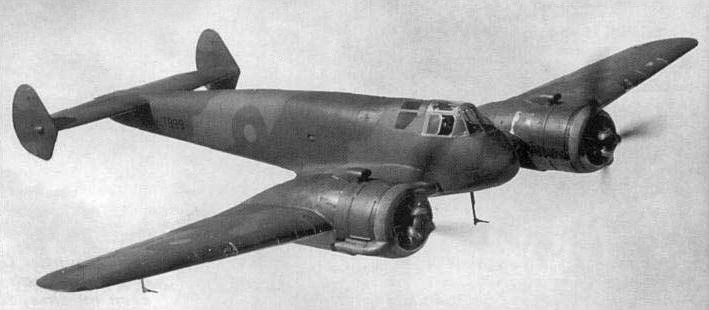
Bristol Taurus powered Gloster F.9/37

- Bristol Type 148
- Bristol Beaufort
- Fairey Albacore
- Fairey Battle testbed only
- Gloster F.9/37

== Specifications (Taurus II) ==
Data from Lumsden.

=== General characteristics ===
- Type: 14-cylinder, two-row, supercharged, air-cooled radial engine with dual ignition
- Bore: 5 in (127 mm)
- Stroke: 5.625 in (143 mm)
- Displacement: 1,550 cu in (25.4 L)
- Length: 49.2 in (1,250 mm)
- Diameter: 46.25 in (1,175 mm)
- Dry weight: 1,301 pounds (590 kg)

=== Components ===
- Valvetrain: Sleeve valve
- Supercharger: Single-speed centrifugal type supercharger
- Fuel system: Claudel-Hobson carburettor
- Fuel type: 87 Octane petrol
- Cooling system: Air-cooled
- Reduction gear: Farman epicyclic gearing, 0.444:1

=== Performance ===
- Power output:
- 1,140 hp (850 kW) at 3,225 rpm for takeoff
- 1,050 hp (780 kW) at 3,225 rpm at 5,000 ft (1,500 m)
- Specific power: 0.68 hp/in^{3} (30.83 kW/L)
- Compression ratio: 7.2:1
- Specific fuel consumption: 0.43 lb/(hp·h) (261 g/(kW·h))
- Power-to-weight ratio: 0.81 hp/lb (1.33 kW/kg)

== See also ==
Related development

- Bristol Aquila

Comparable engines

- Fiat A.74
- Gnome-Rhône 14N
- Mitsubishi Kinsei
- Nakajima Sakae
- Piaggio P.XIX
- Pratt & Whitney R-1830 Twin Wasp
- Shvetsov ASh-82
- Tumansky M-88

Related lists

- List of aircraft engines
