= CA-114 =

CA-114 may refer to:

- California State Route 114, a highway in the US state of California
- Caproni Ca.114, an experimental aircraft
