= Bristol Bullpup =

Bullpup
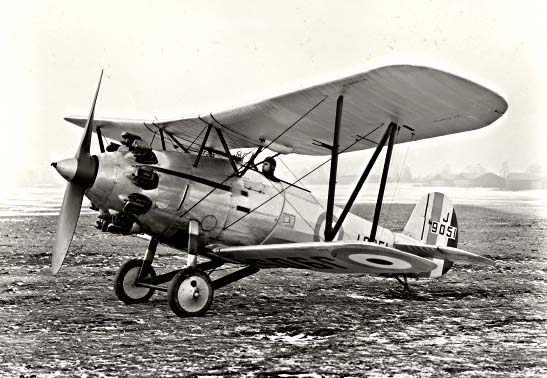

General information
- Type: Interceptor
- National origin: United Kingdom
- Manufacturer: Bristol Aeroplane Company
- Designer: Frank Barnwell
- Number built: 1

History
- First flight: 28 April 1928

The Bristol Type 107 Bullpup was a British fighter aircraft built in the 1920s. It was not selected for squadron service and only the single prototype was built

== Background ==
The design of the Bullpup was an outcome of a series of design studies for a fighter undertaken by Frank Barnwell during the 1920s. In 1924 Barnwell had started work on a fighter powered by the Rolls-Royce Falcon to meet the requirements of specification F.17/24. This project was shelved since Bristol preferred to use their own engine designs, but was revived in 1926 when Barnwell started work on a design, designated the Bristol 102, to meet either F.9/26 for a day-and-night fighter or N.21/26 for a shipborne fighter. A subsequent proposal, designated Type 105 was for another aircraft to meet F.9/26, powered by the Mercury engine then under development at Bristol. These proposals were sufficient for a pair of mockups to be constructed for inspection by the Air Ministry in February 1927. The two aircraft were similar in design, the interceptor to specification F.17/24 design being slightly smaller and lighter and not equipped with radio. As a result, Bristol was asked to revise the design so that it met a later interceptor specification, F.20/27. Subsequently, a prototype was ordered for evaluation, but the other design did not gain official backing. Nevertheless, Bristol considered it promising enough to build a prototype to be entered for the F.9/26 trials as a private venture, powered by a Bristol Jupiter because the supply of Mercurys was expected to be limited. This became the Bristol Bulldog

== Design and development ==
The Type 107 was an unequal span single bay biplane powered by a 480 hp (360 kW) Bristol Mercury air-cooled radial engine driving a two-bladed propeller. The structure was all-metal with a fabric covering, using members built up from rolled high-tensile steel strips riveted together. In order to optimise the pilot's field of view there was large semi-circular cutout in the trailing edge of the upper wing and the inboard section of the lower wing was of reduced chord. Frise ailerons were fitted to the top wing only. It was armed with a pair of 0.303 in (7.7 mm) Vickers guns mounted on either side of the cockpit.

The prototype first flew on 28 April 1928, powered by a Bristol Jupiter engine since a flight-ready Mercury was not yet available, and the aircraft was not delivered to Martlesham Heath for evaluation until March 1929. The Bullpup prototype was subsequently fitted with a Jupiter F type head with twin compensator rods for the penthouse heads. Trials with this engine were carried out at Martlesham in 1929.

== Operational history ==
Performance at the F.20/27 competition held in 1929 was respectable but in the event none of the competitors was to enter service, the requirement eventually being met by the Hawker Fury, a Rolls-Royce Kestrel-engined development of the Hawker F.20/27 contender. The prototype was used as an engine test aircraft until it was scrapped in 1935 at the end of the Bristol Aquila development programme.

== Specifications ==
Data from Bristol Aircraft since 1910

General characteristics

- Crew: 1
- Length: 23 ft 6 in (7.16 m)
- Wingspan: 30 ft 0 in (9.14 m)
- Height: 9 ft 5 in (2.87 m)
- Wing area: 230 sq ft (21.37 m^{2})
- Empty weight: 1,910 lb (866 kg)
- Gross weight: 2,850 lb (1,293 kg)
- Powerplant: 1 × Bristol Mercury IIA , 480 hp (358 kW)

Performance

- Maximum speed: 190 mph (306 km/h, 170 kn)

Armament

- 2 × .303 in (7.7 mm) Vickers guns
