= Bristol Type 148 =

Type 148
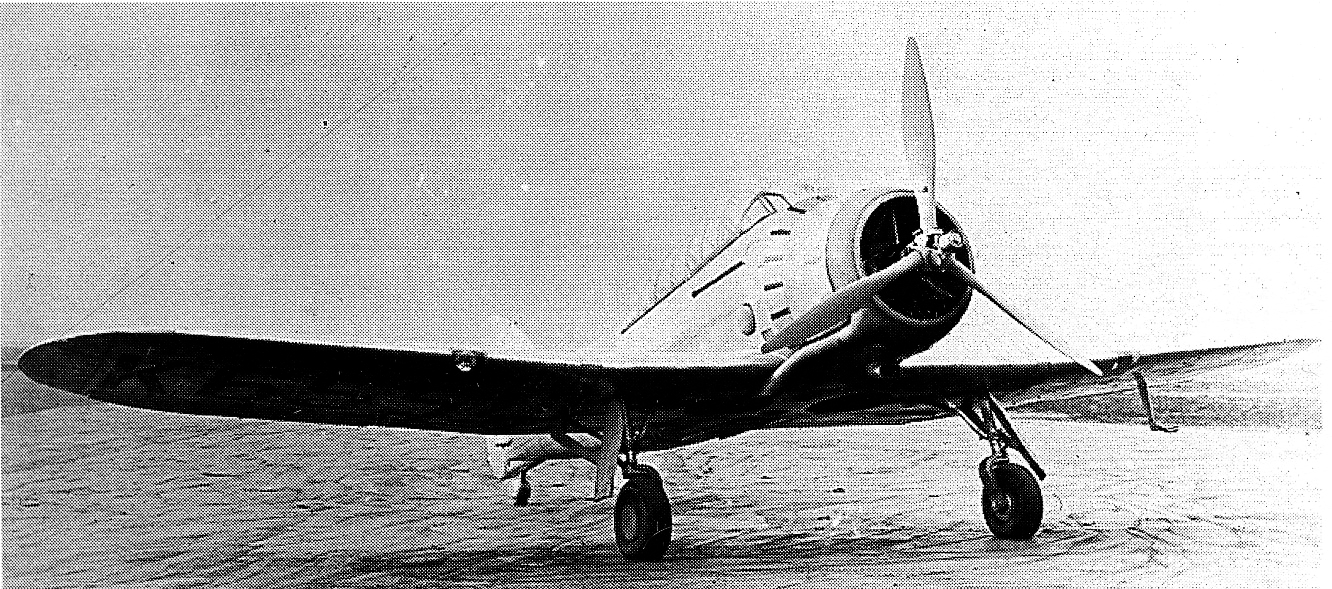

General information
- Type: Army cooperation
- National origin: United Kingdom
- Manufacturer: Bristol Aeroplane Company
- Number built: 2

History
- First flight: 15 October 1937

The Bristol Type 148 was a two-seat, single-engine low-wing monoplane built in 1937 to an Air Ministry specification for an army cooperation aircraft. It lost in the competition to the Westland Lysander and did not progress past the two prototypes that were built.

== Development ==
The Bristol 148 was built by Bristol to an Air Ministry order for two prototypes of an army cooperation aircraft meeting Air Ministry specification A.39/34. The successful aircraft was to replace the Hawker Audax and Hector in a wide range of tasks. By 1935 Bristol had gained experience in the design of cantilever low-wing monoplanes powered by radial engines with the Types 133 and 146, and the Type 148 followed this layout, but had seating for two.

The stressed-skin wings were of constant chord with rounded tips, and the fuselage was entirely of monocoque construction. The horizontal tail was set at the top of the fuselage and carried horn-balanced elevators; the rudder was large and pointed. All flying surfaces were fabric-covered. The wing also carried split flaps and connected wingtip slots to improve handling at the low speeds required by the specification. The wide-track main undercarriage retracted inwards into the centre-section but the tailwheel was fixed and spatted. The pilot and observer/gunner/bomb aimer sat in tandem cockpits under a continuous canopy, the rear part of which was modified when the .303 in (7.7 mm) Lewis Gun mounting was changed from Scarff ring to a pillar type. The observer could also access a prone aiming position on the floor to drop bombs from the external racks. Two .303 in (7.7 mm) machine guns were mounted in the port wing.

The intended engine for the Type 148 was the Bristol Perseus, but the aircraft made its first flight on 15 October 1937 with a Mercury IX. It was re-engined with a Perseus XII after a landing accident during comparative trials with the Westland Lysander. Both aircraft met the specification, including the demanding low-speed requirements but the visibility offered by the Lysander's high wing and the security of its fixed undercarriage made it the competition winner. The second prototype, labelled the Type 148B flew in May 1938, powered by a Bristol Taurus II engine and the two machines were used to compare and evaluate the two engine types.

== Specifications (Type 148B) ==
Data from Barnes 1970, p. 266

General characteristics

- Crew: two
- Length: 31 ft 4 in (9.55 m)
- Wingspan: 40 ft 0 in (12.19 m)
- Height: 10 ft 6 in (3.2 m)
- Wing area: 275 sq ft (25.6 m^{2})
- Empty weight: 4,450 lb (2,020 kg)
- Gross weight: 5,250 lb (2,380 kg)
- Powerplant: 1 × Bristol Taurus II 14-cylinder two-row sleeve-valve radial , 1,050 hp (783 kW)

Performance

- Maximum speed: 290 mph (467 km/h, 250 kn)

Armament

- 2×0.303 in (7.7 mm) Browning machine gun on port wing
- 1×0.303 in (7.7 mm) Lewis gun in rear cockpit
