= De Havilland DH.77 =

DH.77
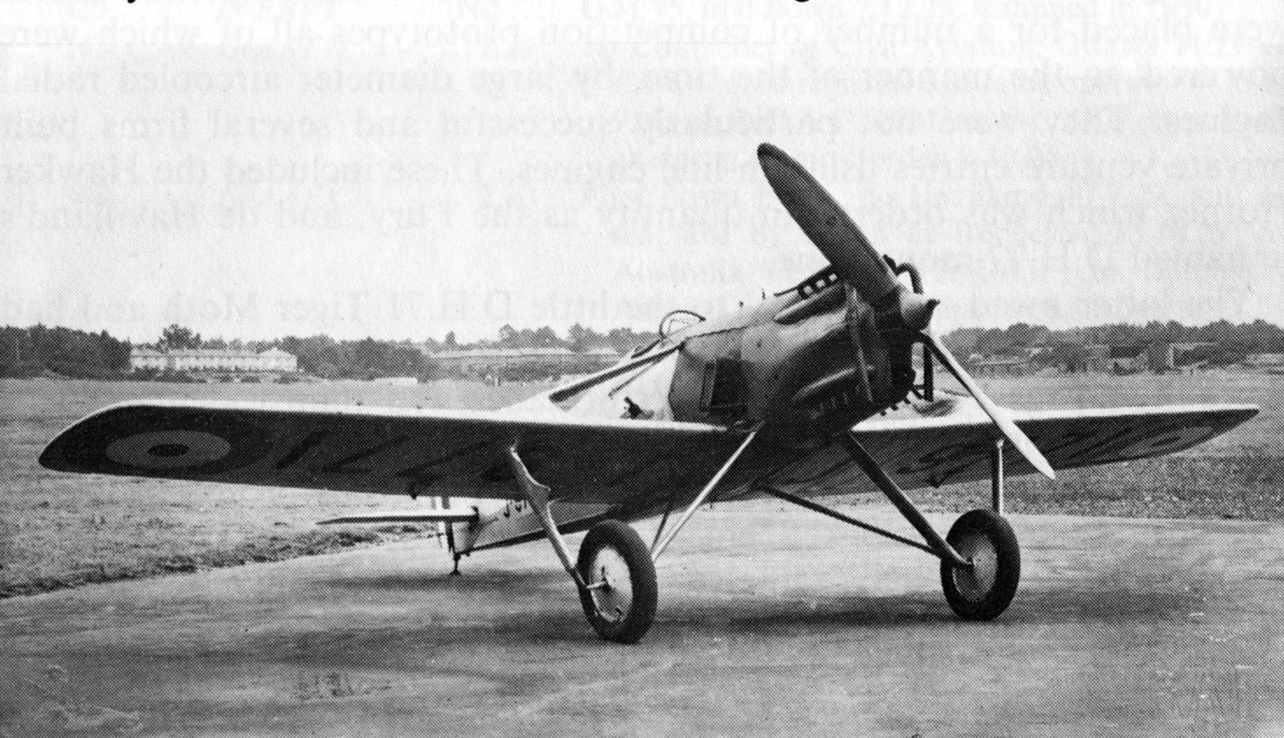

General information
- Type: Interceptor fighter
- National origin: United Kingdom
- Manufacturer: de Havilland
- Designer: W.G Carter
- Status: Prototype
- Number built: 1

History
- First flight: 11 July 1929

The de Havilland DH.77 was a prototype British fighter aircraft of the late 1920s. Intended as a fast climbing interceptor for Britain's Royal Air Force, the DH.77 was a lightweight low-wing monoplane powered by a relatively low power engine. Despite excellent performance, only one aircraft was built, the Hawker Fury biplane being preferred.

== Development and design ==
In 1927, the British Air Ministry, faced with the need to deal with increased bomber performance, issued Specification F.20/27 for a single-seat interceptor. Unlike previous fighter Specifications, the resulting aircraft were intended to be short-range (not intended to mount standing patrols), fast climbing high altitude aircraft, carrying a minimum of equipment. To meet this requirement, de Havilland developed as a private venture the DH.77, designed by W.G. Carter, of Gloster Aircraft Company, (Note: There was an agreement between de Havilland and Gloster to co-operate on the development of de Havilland military aircraft) in close collaboration with engine designer Frank Halford. De Havilland chose to concentrate on civilian aircraft in 1930 and the DH.77 (along with the incomplete DH.72 bomber) were turned over to Gloster.

The DH.77 was a small low-winged lightweight monoplane, of mixed metal-and-wood construction, powered by a 300 hp (224 kW) Napier Rapier air-cooled H-engine, which offered very low frontal area to minimise drag. The wing was braced with distinctive streamlined bracing struts above the wing, while the aircraft had a wide-track fixed tailwheel undercarriage. It was fitted with large span ailerons and a stabilator to give good control characteristics and spin recovery. Armament was the normal pair of synchronised Vickers machine guns, mounted on each side of the cockpit.

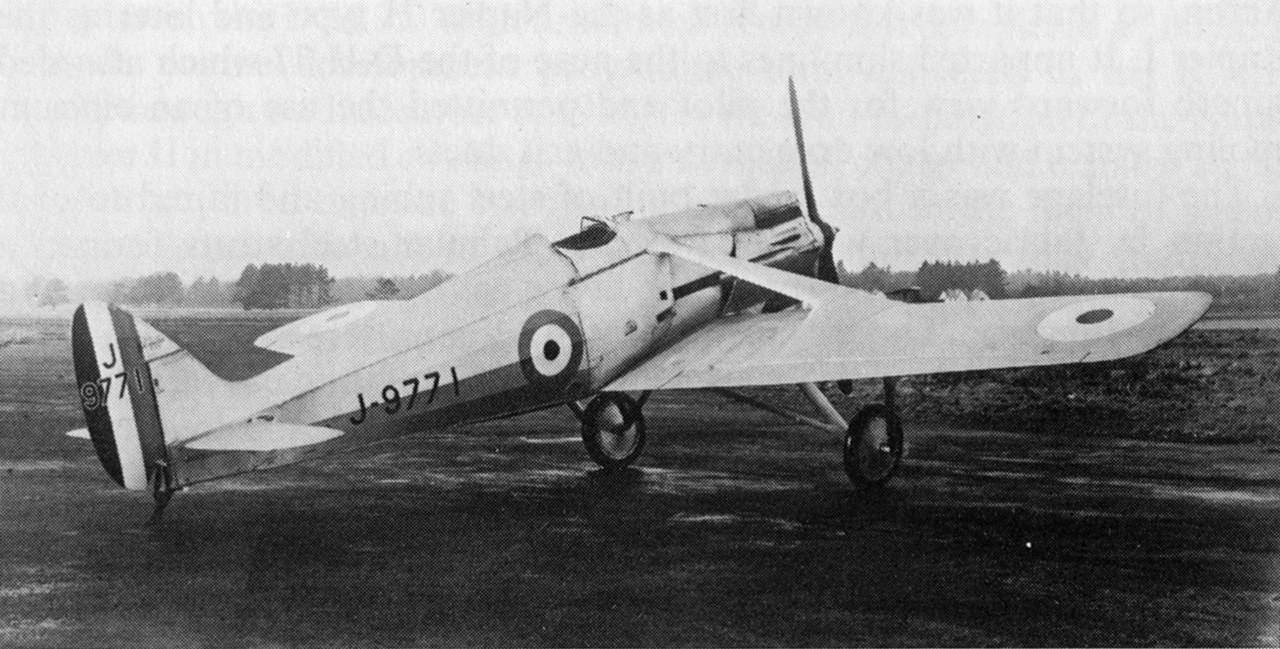

The single prototype first flew on 11 July 1929 piloted by H.S. Broad. Despite the low power of the Rapier (which gave only 60% of the power of the Rolls-Royce Kestrel which powered the competing Hawker Hornet), the DH.77 demonstrated excellent performance, reaching 204 mph (328 km/h) (although performance carrying a full military load was less, reaching 185 mph (298 km/h)). It was delivered to Martlesham Heath for evaluation by the Aeroplane and Armament Experimental Establishment on 12 December 1929. Although the prototype was purchased by the Air Ministry, no production followed, the orders going to the heavier and more powerful Hawker Fury, the production version of the Hornet. The DH.77 continued in use at Martlesham until 1934.

== Specifications ==
Data from De Havilland Aircraft since 1909.

General characteristics

- Crew: 1
- Length: 24 ft 4 3/4 in (7.44 m)
- Wingspan: 32 ft 2 in (9.80 m)
- Height: 8 ft 0 in (2.44 m)
- Wing area: 163 sq ft (15.1 m^{2})
- Empty weight: 1,655 lb (751 kg)
- Gross weight: 2,279 lb (1,034 kg)
- Powerplant: 1 × Napier Rapier I air-cooled 16-cylinder H engine, 300 hp (220 kW)

Performance

- Maximum speed: 204 mph (328 km/h, 177 kn) at 10,000 ft (3,000 m)
- Service ceiling: 25,900 ft (7,900 m)
- Rate of climb: 1,885 ft/min (9.58 m/s)

Armament

- Guns: 2 × .303 in Vickers machine guns

== See also ==
Aircraft of comparable role, configuration, and era

- Handley Page Type S
- Vickers Jockey
- Vickers Vireo
- Westland Interceptor
