= Saunders A.10 =

Four-gun fighter biplane

A.10
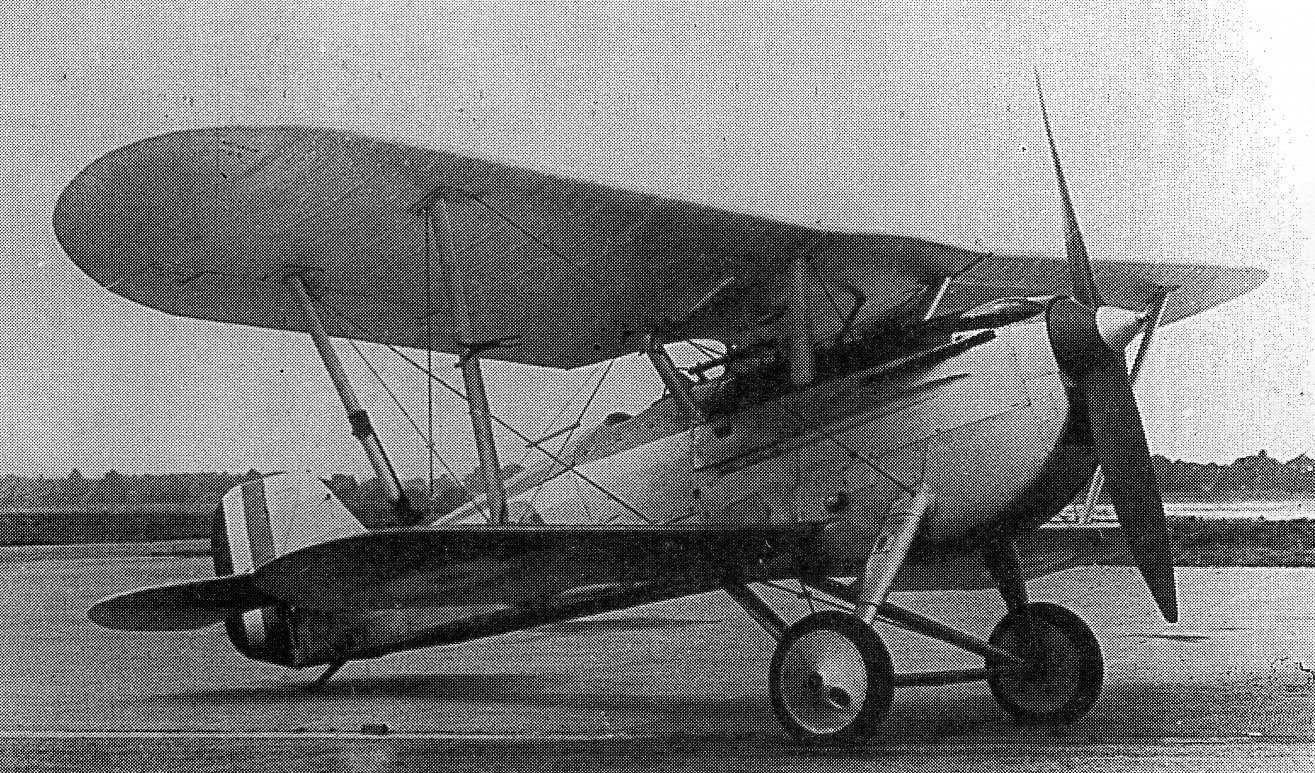

General information
- Type: Single-seat fighter
- National origin: United Kingdom
- Manufacturer: S.E. Saunders Ltd.
- Designer: Harry Knowler
- Number built: 1

History
- First flight: 27 January 1929
- Retired: 1933

The Saunders A.10 was a private venture four-gun fighter. It was a single-seat, single-engined biplane with poor handling, later serving as a gun-testing aircraft.

== Design and development ==
After their first aircraft, the T.1, Saunders did not build another landplane until 1928 when the Saunders A.10 single-seat fighter appeared. The original design was a private venture, its distinguishing feature its four-gun armament at a time when two machine guns were standard. Because of this the A.10 was sometimes referred to as the "Multi-gun"; because by the time the A.10 was ready to fly S.E.Saunders Ltd had been bought out by A.V. Roe and John Lloyd it is sometimes known as the Saunders/Saro A.10 or the Saro A.10.

Air Ministry specification F.20/27 was issued during the design process and Saunders decided to submit the A.10 even though that specification only called for two guns and suggested the use of the radial Bristol Mercury rather than the inline Rolls-Royce F.XIS that designer Harry Knowler had chosen. The Air Ministry provided an unsupercharged F.XI engine and the A.10 first flew on 27 January 1929. It was a compact single bay sesquiplane with a duraluminum airframe, fabric covered throughout apart from the forward fuselage. The fuselage was largely built from tubular members, bolted together. The pilot sat with the upper wing at eye level to optimise the view both above and below, helped by cut-outs in the lower plane roots and a thinner aerofoil in the upper centre section. The breeches of all four guns were accessible to him, with two in the forward decking and two in the fuselage sides. The water-cooled engine's chin radiator sat behind a roller blind shutter, close to the twin-bladed propeller. The simple single axle undercarriage was mounted on a pair of inverted V-struts joining the fuselage ahead and aft of the lower wing.

The broader chord, greater span upper wing carried the ailerons, initially unbalanced but quickly modified to Frise hinged type to lighten the feel. Stagger was exaggerated by the smaller chord of the lower wing, which was mounted on the bottom of the fuselage. The rudder and elevators, the latter mounted on a cantilever tailplane were also unbalanced.

== Operational history ==
After the first flight and the aileron modifications, flight testing recommenced in March. In July it was decided to submit the aircraft under Air Ministry specification F.10/27 as well as F.20/27, the earlier specification calling for a six gun fighter. In armament terms, the A.10 fitted neither. In August 1929 it went to the Aeroplane and Armament Experimental Establishment (A&AEE) for tests under F.20/27, armed with just two guns. The reports were very critical: the A.10 suffered from longitudinal instability and was almost impossible to hold at constant speed in dives or in the climb. Ground handling was also said to be difficult.

These trials ended in January 1930 and the A.10 went back to Saro's for modification. Changes included a 3 in (76 mm) shift aft of the main undercarriage to improve ground handling, a 1 ft 9 in (533 mm) fuselage extension and revised empennage. The tailplane now had a straight, rather than swept leading edge. When it went back to the A&AEE in September most of the old faults remained and no more were ordered.

Curiously, in view of the A&AEE's comments on the problems the A.10's longitudinal instability would pose it as a gun platform, it was used by the Establishment to explore the effects of multi-gun armament, trials also involving the Gloster SS.19. These lasted initially until December 1930, then, after a period of unserviceability, from 1932 to 1933. The aircraft was struck off charge on 20 November 1933.

== Specifications (F.20/27 configuration, short fuselage) ==
Data from London 1988, p. 92.

General characteristics

- Crew: 1
- Length: 24 ft 5 in (7.44 m)
- Wingspan: 32 ft 0 in (9.75 m)
- Height: 9 ft 9 in (2.97 m)
- Wing area: 273 sq ft (25.4 m^{2})
- Empty weight: 2,674 lb (1,213 kg)
- Gross weight: 3,467 lb (1,573 kg)
- Powerplant: 1 × Rolls-Royce F.XI 12-cylinder water-cooled inline , 480 hp (360 kW)

Performance

- Maximum speed: 200 mph (320 km/h, 170 kn)
- Service ceiling: 29,000 ft (8,800 m)

Armament

- 2×0.303 in (7.7 mm) Vickers machine guns
