= Caproni Ca.114 =

Italian biplane fighter

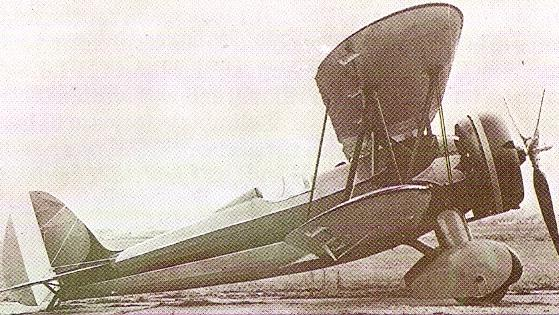

General information
- Type: Fighter
- Manufacturer: Caproni
- Primary user: Peruvian Aviation Corps
- Number built: 36

History
- First flight: 1933

The Caproni Ca.114 was a fighter biplane produced in Italy in the early 1930s which was flown operationally in Peru in the 1930s and 1940s.

== Design ==
The Caproni company designed the Ca.114 in 1933 to compete against other designs to provide the Regia Aeronautica (Italian Royal Air Force) with a new single-seat fighter. Its airframe was derived from the Caproni Ca.113 trainer, and it was a single-bay biplane with staggered wings of equal span. The fuselage was made of steel tubing covered by detachable metal panels on the forward part of the aircraft and by fabric on the rear part, and the two-spar wooden wings were fabric-covered.

The Bristol Mercury IV radial engine was geared, supercharged, rated at 395 kilowatts at 4,000 meters (530 horsepower at 13,125 feet), and drove an adjustable-pitch three-bladed propeller. Armament consisted of two fixed forward-firing 7.7-millimeter machine guns.

== Operational history ==
After official trials, the Regia Aeronautica rejected the Ca.114 in favour of the Fiat CR.32. Nevertheless, Caproni found a buyer in the Peruvian Aviation Corps, which ordered 12 examples in April 1934. These aircraft were delivered in two batches, the first in late November 1934, and the second in January 1935. These were pressed into service with the 2do Escuadron de Caza [2nd Fighter Squadron], part of Primer Escuadrón de Aviación [First Aviation Squadron] based in the newly created "Teniente Coronel Pedro Ruiz Gallo" in Chiclayo. Only a single loss was recorded by 1939, when the fleet was sent to the Caproni Factory in Lima to receive an overhaul. The heavy exhaust collector ring was discarded and replaced by individual exhaust stacks, which probably improved the aircraft maximum speed. Additionally, the original red-black scheme was replaced by a silver dope overall finish. Ten remaining aircraft took part, as part of the 42 and 43 Escuadrillas [flights], of the XXI Escuadrón de Caza [Fighter Squadron], along with six more modern North American NA-50 fighters.

After the war the Ca.114s were withdrawn from the front line and four aircraft employed in training duties from Las Palmas airbase in Lima until late 1944 when they were grounded and, shortly after, scrapped.

== Operators ==
Peru

- Cuerpo Aeronáutico del Perú (Peruvian Aviation Corps)

=== Peruvian Air Force Ca.114 order of battle ===
==== 1934–1935 ====
2do Escuadron de Caza, I Escuadrón de Aviación (nine machines) Training at Las Palmas, Lima, with three airframes as reserve.

==== 1935–1938 ====
2do Escuadrón de Caza, I Escuadrón de Aviación (nine a/c) Teniente Coronel Pedro Ruiz Gallo AB, Chiclayo

Escuela de Aviación Militar "Jorge Chávez", Las Palmas, Lima (three a/c)

==== 1939–1942 ====
42 & 43 Escuadrillas, XXI Escuadrón de Caza (three a/c each, increased to five a/c each from June 1941) Teniente Coronel Pedro Ruiz Gallo AB, Chiclayo

V Escuadrón de Instrucción (two Machines) Las Palmas AB, Lima

==== 1942–1944 ====
28 Escuadrón de Instrucción (four machines) Las Palmas, Lima

== Specifications ==
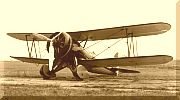

General characteristics

- Crew: one, pilot
- Length: 7.68 m (25 ft 2 in)
- Wingspan: 10.50 m (34 ft 5 in)
- Height: 2.54 m (8 ft 4 in)
- Wing area: 25.7 m^{2} (276 sq ft)
- Empty weight: 1,310 kg (2,888 lb)
- Gross weight: 1,660 kg (3,660 lb)
- Powerplant: 1 × Alfa Romeo license built Bristol Mercury IV , 395 kW (530 hp) at 4,000 m (13,000 ft)

Performance

- Maximum speed: 355 km/h (221 mph, 192 kn)
- Range: 600 km (373 mi, 324 nmi)
- Service ceiling: 9,500 m (31,170 ft)
- Rate of climb: 12.5 m/s (2,460 ft/min)

Armament

- 2 × fixed, forward-firing 7.7 mm (.303 in) Breda-SAFAT machine guns, modified to fire 7.65 mm ammunition on Peruvian machines

== See also ==
Related lists

- List of Interwar military aircraft
