= Bristol Mercury =

Aircraft engine

Mercury
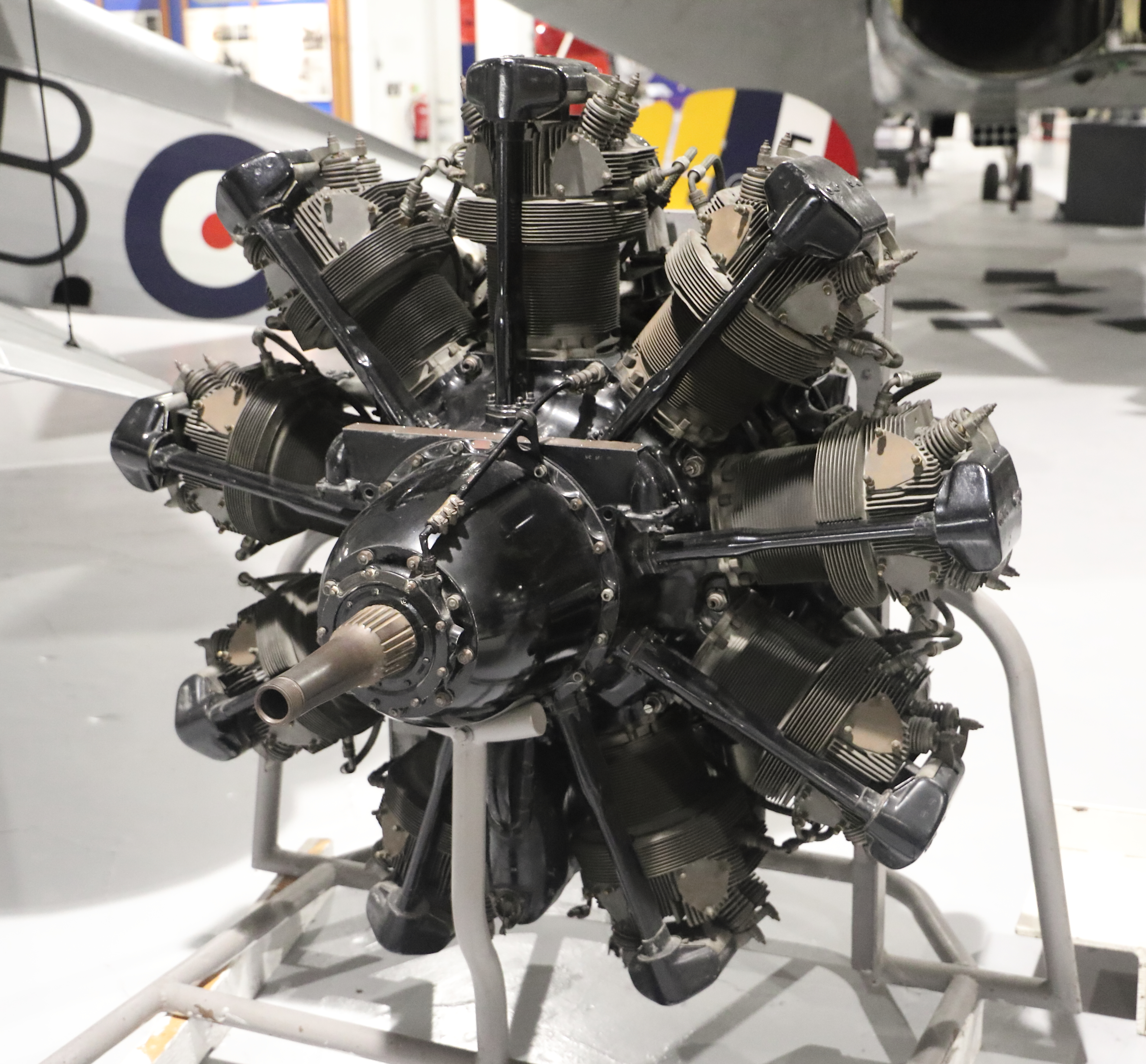
- Preserved Bristol Mercury VII on display at the Royal Air Force Museum London
- Type: Piston aero engine
- Manufacturer: Bristol Aeroplane Company
- Designer: Roy Fedden
- First run: 1925
- Major applications: Bristol Blenheim; Gloster Gladiator; Fokker D.XXI; Westland Lysander
- Number built: 20,700
- Developed from: Bristol Jupiter
- Developed into: Bristol Pegasus

The Bristol Mercury is a British nine-cylinder, air-cooled, single-row, piston radial engine. Designed by Roy Fedden of the Bristol Aeroplane Company it was used to power both civil and military aircraft of the 1930s and 1940s. Developed from the earlier Jupiter engine, later variants could produce 800 horsepower (600 kW) from its capacity of 1,500 cubic inches (25 L) by use of a geared supercharger.

Almost 21,000 engines were produced, with a number also being built under license elsewhere in Europe. Several examples remain airworthy, with other preserved examples on public display in aviation museums.

== Design and development ==
The Mercury was developed by the Bristol Aeroplane Company in 1925 as their Bristol Jupiter was reaching the end of its lifespan. Although the Mercury initially failed to attract much interest, the Air Ministry eventually funded three prototypes and it became another winner for the designer Roy Fedden.

With the widespread introduction of superchargers to the aviation industry in order to improve altitude performance, Fedden felt it was reasonable to use a small amount of boost at all times in order to improve performance of an otherwise smaller engine. Instead of designing an entirely new block, the existing Jupiter parts were re-used with the stroke reduced by one inch (25 mm). The smaller capacity engine was then boosted back to Jupiter power levels, while running at higher rpm and thus requiring a reduction gear for the propeller. The same techniques were applied to the original Jupiter-sized engine to produce the Pegasus.

The Mercury's smaller size was aimed at fighter use and it powered the Gloster Gauntlet and its successor, the Gloster Gladiator. It was intended that the larger Pegasus would be for bombers, but as the power ratings of both engines rose, the Mercury was used in almost all roles. Perhaps its most famous use was in a twin-engine light bomber, the Bristol Blenheim.

In 1938 Roy Fedden pressed the Air Ministry to import supplies of 100 octane aviation spirit from the US. This new fuel would allow aero engines to run at higher compression ratios and supercharger boost pressure than the existing 87-octane fuel, thus increasing the power. The Mercury XV was one of the first British aero engines to be type-tested and cleared to use the 100-octane fuel in 1939. This engine was capable of running with a boost pressure of +9 lbs/sq.in (0.62 bar) and was first used in the Blenheim Mk IV.

The Mercury was also the first British aero engine to be approved for use with variable-pitch propellers.

The Bristol company and its shadow factories produced 20,700 examples of the engine. Outside the United Kingdom, Mercury was licence-built by Państwowe Zakłady Lotnicze in Poland and used in the PZL P.11 fighters. It was also built by NOHAB in Sweden and used in the Swedish Gloster Gladiator fighters and in the Saab 17 dive-bomber. In Italy, it was built by Alfa Romeo as the Mercurius. In Czechoslovakia it was built by Walter Engines. In Finland, it was built by Tampella and mainly used on Bristol Blenheim bombers.

== Variants ==
Note:

Mercury I
(1926) 808 hp (603 kW), direct drive. Schneider Trophy racing engine
Mercury II
(1928) 420 hp (310 kW), compression ratio 5.3:1
Mercury IIA
(1928) 440 hp (330 kW)
Mercury III
(1929) 485 hp (362 kW), compression ratio 4.8:1, 0.5:1 reduction gear

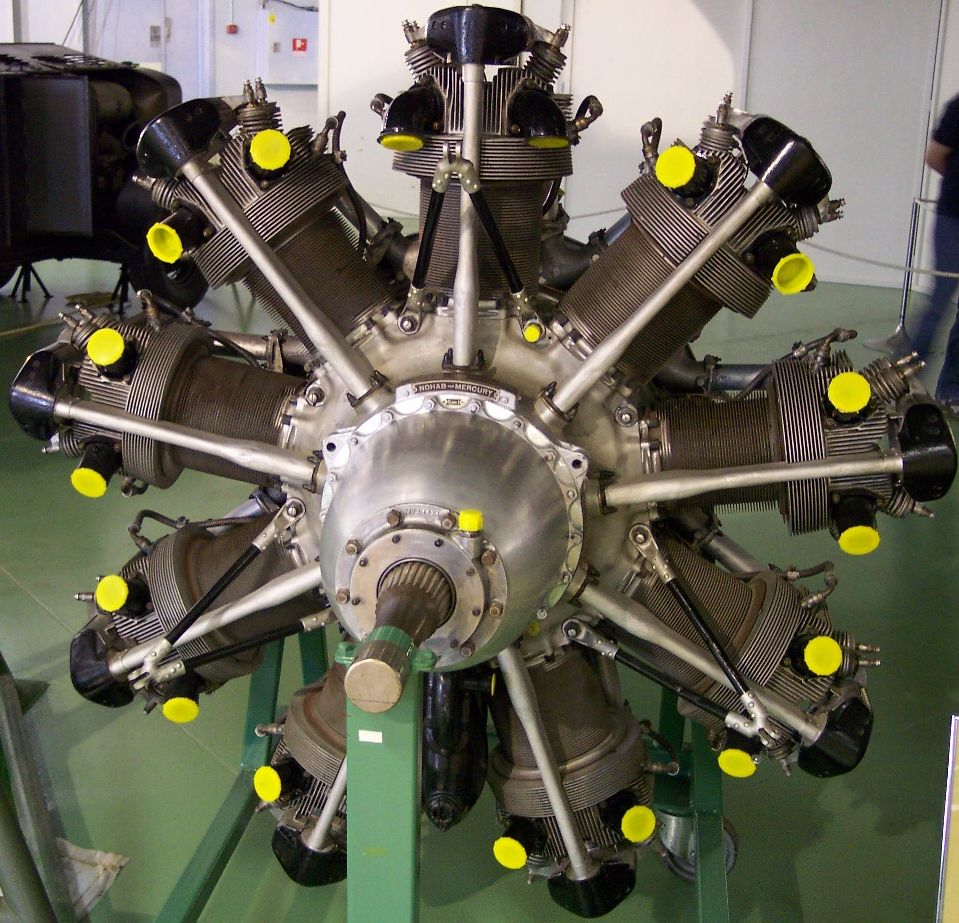
Mercury license built by NOHAB

Mercury IIIA
Minor modification of Mercury III
Mercury IV
(1929) 485 hp (362 kW), 0.656:1 reduction gear
Mercury IVA
(1931) 510 hp (380 kW)
Mercury IVS.2
(1932) 510 hp (380 kW)
Mercury (Short stroke)
Unsuccessful experimental short stroke (5.0 in) version, 390 hp (290 kW)
Mercury V
546 hp (407 kW) (became the Pegasus IS.2)
Mercury VIS
(1933) 605 hp (451 kW)

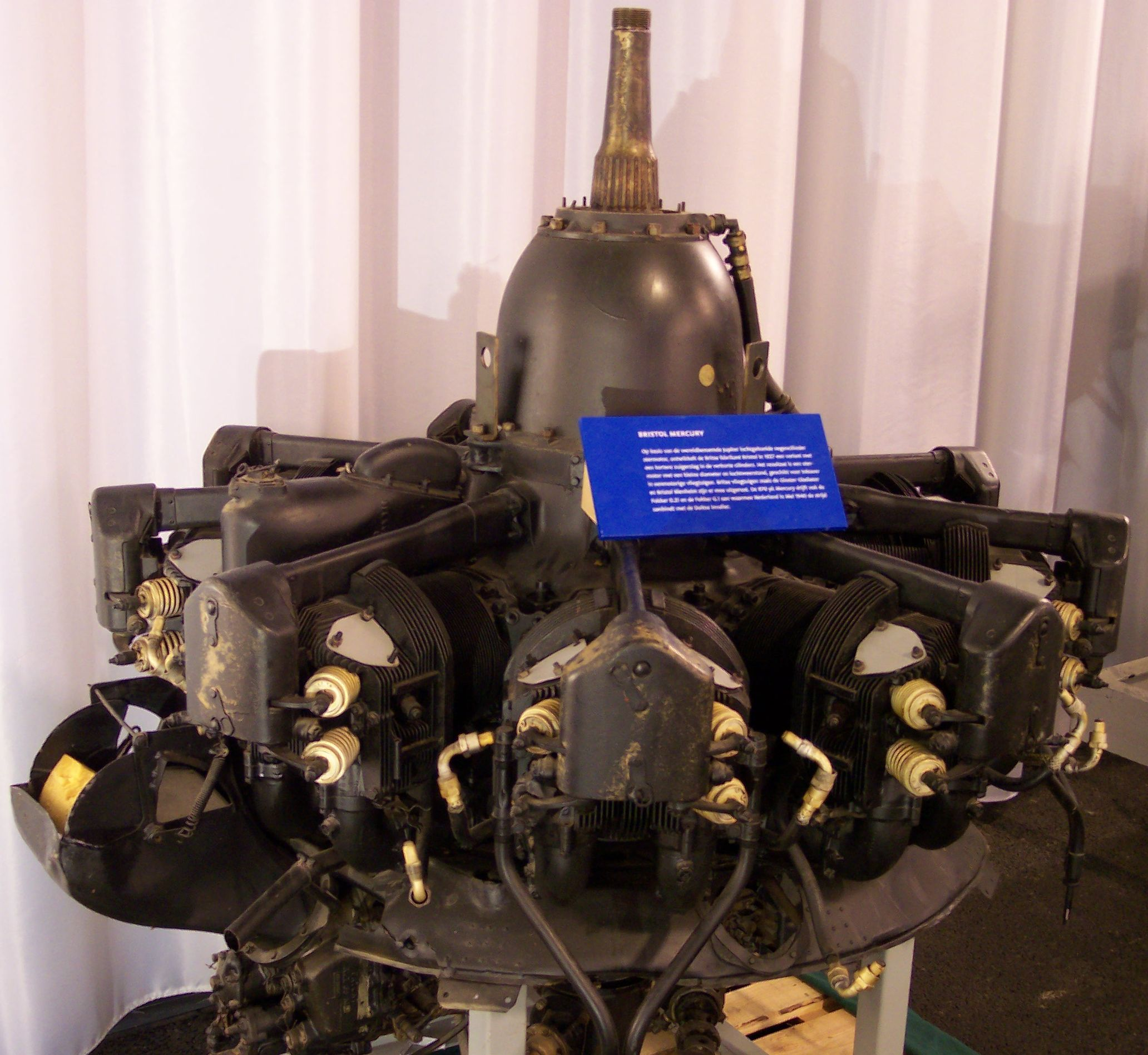
Side view showing valve gear detail.

Mercury VISP
(1931) 605 hp (451 kW), 'P' for Persia.
Mercury VIS.2
(1933) 605 hp (451 kW)
Mercury VIA
(1928) 575 hp (429 kW) (became the Pegasus IU.2)
Mercury VIIA
560 hp (420 kW) (became the Pegasus IM.2)
Mercury VIII
(1935) 825 hp (615 kW), compression ratio 6.25:1, lightened engine.
Mercury VIIIA
Mercury VIII fitted with gun synchronisation gear for the Gloster Gladiator MkII
Mercury VIIIA
535 hp, second use of VIIIA designation, (became the Pegasus IU.2P)
Mercury IX
(1935) 825 hp (615 kW), lightened engine.
Mercury X
(1937) 820 hp (610 kW)
Mercury XI
(1937) 820 hp (610 kW)
Mercury XII

(1937) 820 hp (610 kW)

Mercury XV
(1938) 825 hp (615 kW), developed from Mercury VIII. Converted to run on 100 Octane fuel (previously 87 Octane).
Mercury XVI
830 hp (620 kW)
Mercury XX
(1940) 810 hp (600 kW)
Mercury 25
(1941) 825 hp (615 kW), Mercury XV with crankshaft modifications.
Mercury 26
825 hp (615 kW), Mercury 25 with modified carburettor.
Mercury 30
(1941) 810 hp (600 kW), Mercury XX with crankshaft modifications.
Mercury 31
(1945) 810 hp (600 kW), Mercury 30 with carburettor modifications and fixed pitch propeller for Hamilcar X.

== Applications ==
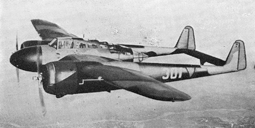
The Mercury powered Fokker G.1

Note:

- Airspeed Cambridge
- Blackburn Skua
- Boulton Paul P.108
- Bristol Blenheim
- Bristol Bolingbroke
- Bristol Bulldog
- Bristol Bullpup
- Bristol Type 101
- Bristol Type 118
- Bristol Type 133
- Bristol Type 142
- Bristol Type 146
- Bristol Type 148
- Breda Ba.27
- Caproni Ca.114
- Fairey Flycatcher
- Fokker D XXI
- Fokker G.1
- General Aircraft Hamilcar X
- Gloster Gamecock
- Gloster Gladiator
- Gloster Gauntlet
- Gloster Gnatsnapper
- Gloster Goring
- Hawker Audax
- Hawker F.20/27
- Hawker Fury
- Hawker Hart
- Hawker Hind
- Hawker Hoopoe
- Hawker F.20/27
- IMAM Ro.30
- Koolhoven F.K.52
- Letov Š-31
- Miles Martinet
- Miles Master
- PZL P.11
- PZL.50
- Saab 17
- Short Crusader
- Supermarine Sea Otter
- Valmet Vihuri
- Vickers Jockey
- Westland Interceptor
- Westland Lysander

== Airworthy examples ==
The Shuttleworth Collection operates two Bristol Mercury powered aircraft: A Westland Lysander III (G-AZWT) and a Gloster Gladiator I (G-AMRK) which can be seen during flying displays at Old Warden Aerodrome, Bedfordshire.

The Aircraft Restoration Company based at Duxford Airfield also operate a Mercury powered Westland Lysander (G-CCOM) as well as a Bristol Blenheim I (G-BPIV) light bomber fitted with two Bristol Mercurys, which can be seen at air displays at IWM Duxford as well as across the UK.

The Fighter Collection, also currently based at Duxford Airfield, operate a 1939 Gloster Gladiator II (G-GLAD) powered by a Bristol Mercury XX.

The Canadian Warplane Heritage Museum has a Lysander IIIA in flying condition as does the Vintage Wings of Canada.

== Engines on display ==
- A Bristol Mercury VII is on display at the Royal Air Force Museum London.
- Another example of a Bristol Mercury VII is on display at the Shuttleworth Collection.
- A sectioned Bristol Mercury is on display at the Fleet Air Arm Museum, RNAS Yeovilton.
- Bristol Mercury V is in running condition mounted on last PZL P.11 fighter at the Muzeum Lotnictwa Polskiego in Kraków.
- A Tampella Mercury is displayed next to Valmet Vihuri at Finnish Air Force Museum.

== Specifications (Mercury VI-S) ==
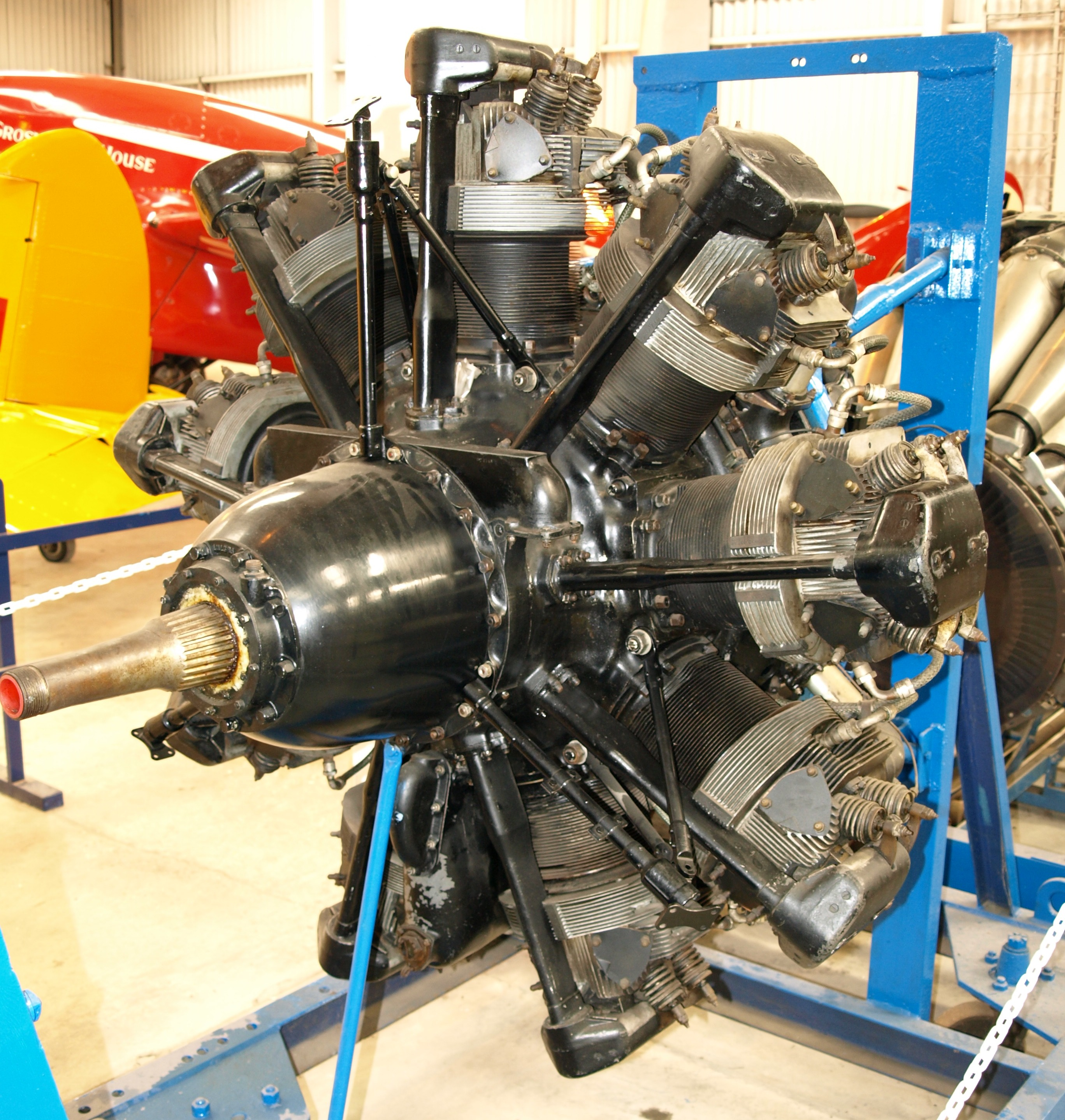
Bristol Mercury VII on display at the Shuttleworth Collection

Data from Lumsden

=== General characteristics ===
- Type: Nine-cylinder single-row supercharged air-cooled radial engine
- Bore: 5.75 in (146 mm)
- Stroke: 6.5 in (165 mm)
- Displacement: 1,520 in^{3} (24.9 L)
- Length: 47 in (1,194 mm)
- Diameter: 51.5 in (1,307 mm)
- Dry weight: 966 lb (438 kg)

=== Components ===
- Valvetrain: Overhead valve, 4 valves per cylinder – 2 intake and 2 sodium-filled exhaust
- Supercharger: Single-speed centrifugal type supercharger
- Fuel system: Claudel-Hobson carburettor
- Fuel type: 87 Octane petrol
- Cooling system: Air-cooled
- Reduction gear: Farman epicyclic gearing, 0.5:1, left hand tractor

=== Performance ===
- Power output:
- 612 hp (457 kW) at 2,750 rpm for takeoff
- 636 hp (474 kW) at 2,750 rpm at 15,500 ft (4,730 m)
- Specific power: 0.4 hp/in^{3} (18.35 kW/L)
- Compression ratio: 6:1
- Specific fuel consumption: 0.49 lb/(hp·h) (300 g/kWh)
- Power-to-weight ratio: 0.63 hp/lb (1.04 kW/kg)

== See also ==
Related development

- Bristol Jupiter
- Bristol Pegasus

Comparable engines

- BMW 114
- BMW 132
- Bramo 323
- Pratt & Whitney R-1340
- Shvetsov ASh-62
- Wright R-1820

Related lists

- List of aircraft engines
