= Hawker Fury =

1931 British fighter aircraft

Fury
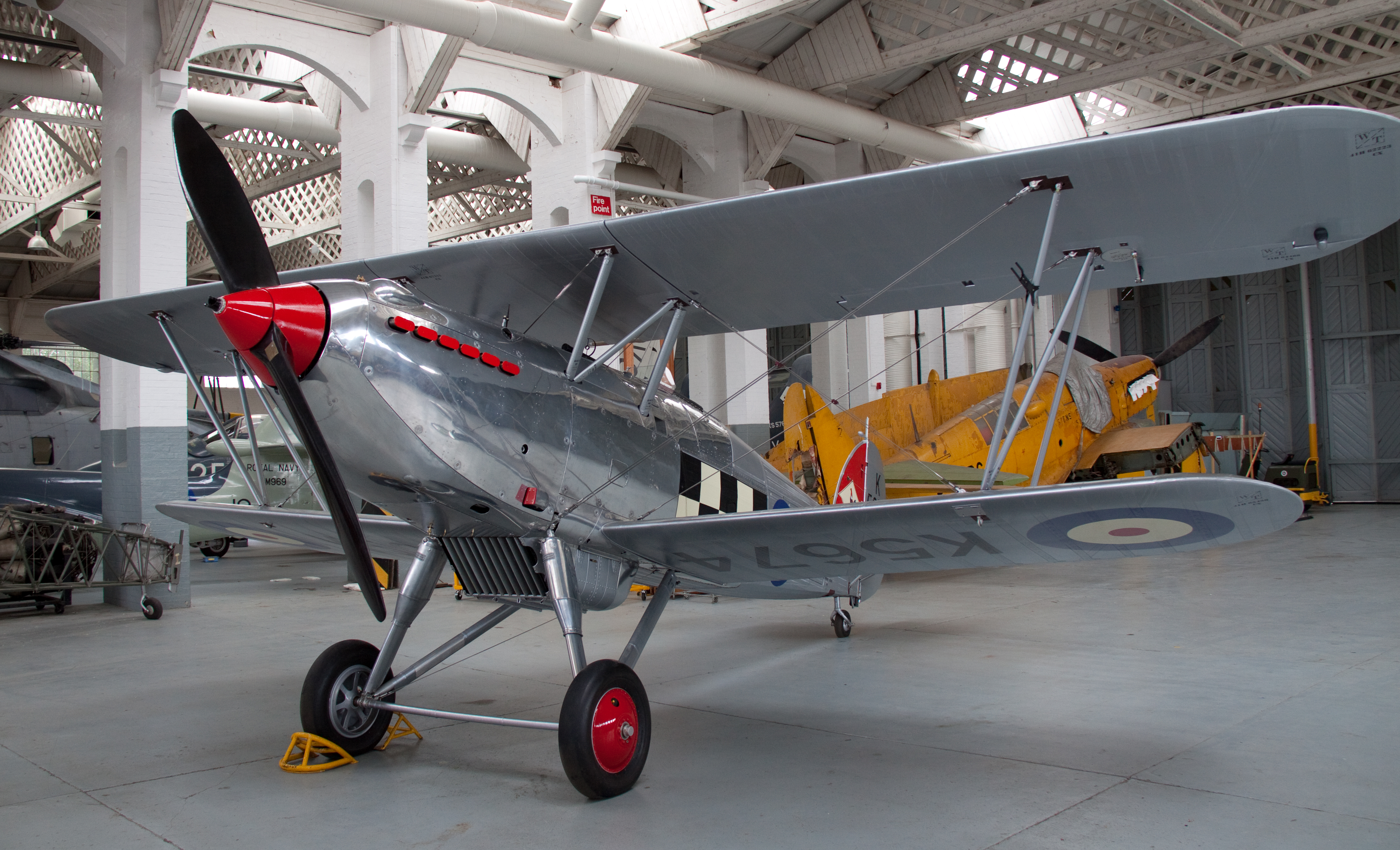
- Hawker Fury K5674, painted in 43 Squadron colours

General information
- Type: Fighter
- Manufacturer: Hawker Aircraft
- Primary users: Royal Air Force: South African Air Force; Spanish Air Force; Royal Yugoslav Air Force
- Number built: 275

History
- Introduction date: 1931
- First flight: 25 March 1931
- Retired: 1949 Imperial Iranian Air Force

The Hawker Fury is a British biplane fighter aircraft used by the Royal Air Force in the 1930s. It was a fast, agile aircraft, and the first interceptor in RAF service faster than 200 mph (320 km/h) in level flight. It was the fighter counterpart to the Hawker Hart light bomber.

== Design and development ==
The Hawker Fury was a development of the earlier Hawker F.20/27 prototype fighter, replacing the radial engine of the F.20/27 with the new Rolls-Royce F.XI V-12 engine (later known as the Rolls-Royce Kestrel), which was also used by Hawker's new light bomber, the Hawker Hart. The new fighter prototype, known as the Hawker Hornet, first flew at Brooklands, Surrey, in March 1929. The Hornet was a single-engined biplane, with single bay wings, initially powered by a 420 hp (310 kW) Rolls-Royce F.XIC engine enclosed by a smooth, streamlined cowling but was quickly re-engined with a 480 hp (360 kW) Kestrel IS. The prototype was evaluated against the similarly powered Fairey Firefly II, being preferred because of its better handling and its all metal structure, compared with the mainly wooden construction of the Firefly.

The Hornet was purchased by the Air Ministry at the start of 1930 and was subject to more tests, with a small initial production order for 21 aircraft (to be called Hawker Fury – as the Air Ministry wanted fighter names that "reflected ferocity") placed during 1930. The Fury I made its maiden flight at Brooklands, with chief test pilot George Bulman at the controls, on 25 March 1931. The Fury was the first operational RAF fighter aircraft to be able to exceed 200 mph (320 km/h) in level flight. It had highly sensitive controls which gave it superb aerobatic performance. It was designed partly for the fast interception of bombers and to that end it could climb to 10,000 ft (3,000 m) in 4 minutes 25 seconds, powered by a 525 hp (391 kW) Kestrel engine.

An experimental prototype, the High Speed Fury, was built to test design features for Hawker's planned competitor for the F.7/30 fighter competition (the Hawker P.V.3) as well as for more general development. While the P.V.3 was unsuccessful owing to the use of the unreliable evaporatively cooled Rolls-Royce Goshawk engine, many of the improvements tested on the High Speed Fury were incorporated in an improved Fury II, with a cleaned up airframe and reduced drag, powered by a 690 hp (510 kW) Mk4 Kestrel engine, which gave improved speed and rate of climb. Sydney Camm designed a monoplane version of the Fury in 1933. It was not developed until Rolls-Royce produced what became their famous Merlin engine. The design was then revised according to Air Ministry specification F5/34 to become the prototype Hawker Hurricane.

== Operational history ==
The Fury I entered squadron service with the RAF in May 1931, re-equipping 43 Squadron. Owing to finance cuts in the Great Depression, only relatively small numbers of Fury Is were ordered, the type equipping 1 and 25 squadrons; the slower Bristol Bulldog equipped ten fighter squadrons. The Fury II entered service in 1936–1937, increasing total number of squadrons to six. Furies remained with RAF Fighter Command until January 1939, replaced primarily with Gloster Gladiators and other types, such as Hurricane. After their front line service ended, they continued in use as trainers.

The Fury was exported to several customers, being supplied with a variety of engines, including Kestrels, Hispano Suiza and Lorraine Petrel vee-type engines, Armstrong Siddeley Panther, Pratt & Whitney Hornet and Bristol Mercury radials. Three Furies were ordered by Spain in 1935, it being intended to produce another 50 under licence. The Spanish variant had a cantilever undercarriage design with Dowty internally sprung wheels, similar to that used on the Gladiator and was powered by a 612 hp (456 kW) Hispano Suiza 12Xbr engine, reaching a speed of 234 mph (377 km/h). The three Furies were delivered without armament on 11 July 1936, just before the outbreak of the Spanish Civil War. They were taken into service by the Spanish Republican Air Force, being fitted with machine guns salvaged from crashed aircraft. One Fury made a forced landing behind enemy lines due to a lack of fuel and was repaired by the Nationalists, although it was not used operationally, while the Republicans used one of the Furies in the defence of Madrid until wrecked in a crash in November 1936.

Although withdrawn from RAF squadrons, the Fury was still used by some foreign air forces in the early 1940s; Yugoslav Furies saw action against Axis forces in the German invasion of 1941. On 6 April 1941, a squadron of Furies took off against the invading German Messerschmitt Bf 109Es and Messerschmitt Bf 110s. In the resulting air battle 10 Furies were destroyed, almost the entire squadron. The commanding officer of the 36 LG was Major Franjo Džal, who watched from the ground as his men were slaughtered in their obsolete biplanes. In an unequal battle against superior adversaries, five aircraft were destroyed while taking off and eight pilots killed. Two more Furies and Bücker Bü 131 were destroyed on the ground. Of the attacking German aircraft, five Bf 109s and two Bf 110s failed to return, though most were non-combat losses, at least one was lost when rammed by a Fury. The other squadron of Yugoslav Furies active at the time of the invasion strafed enemy tanks and ground forces, some being lost to ground fire and one being destroyed in a dogfight with a Fiat CR.42. The rest of the Yugoslav Furies were destroyed when they became unserviceable or at the time of Armistice on 15 April. Ex-RAF Furies were also used by the South African Air Force against the Italian forces in East Africa in 1940 and despite their obsolescence, destroyed two Caproni bombers as well as strafing many airfields, destroying fighters and bombers on the ground. A total of 262 Furies were produced, of which 22 served in Persia, three in Portugal, at least 30 in South Africa, three in Spain, at least 30 in Yugoslavia and the remainder in the United Kingdom.

== Variants ==
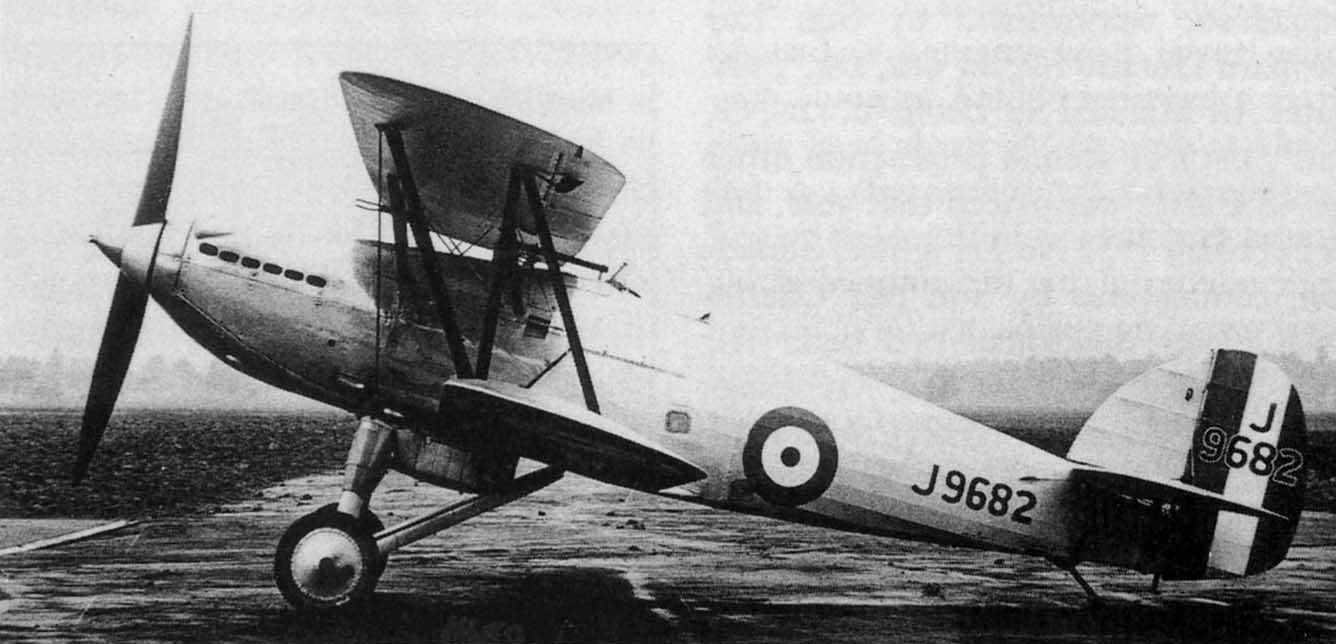
Hawker Hornet (Fury prototype)

Hawker Hornet
Single-seat fighter prototype. Powered by a Rolls-Royce F.XIA and later by a 480 hp (360 kW) F.XIS. Only one was built. This aircraft was slightly smaller and lighter than the Fury and considered by Hawker as a separate type.
Fury Mk I
Single-seat fighter version, powered by a 525 hp (391 kW) Rolls-Royce Kestrel IIs piston engine.
Fury Series 1A
Single-seat fighter for Yugoslavia, similar to Fury Mk I and powered by Kestrel IIS piston engine. Six built by Hawker. One was delivered fitted with a 500 hp (370 kW) Hispano-Suiza 12 NB engine, with poorer performance, and was re-fitted with a Kestrel, while a second was later used for trials with a 720 hp (540 kW) Lorraine Petrel HFrs engine.
Intermediate Fury
Test and trials aircraft, used as a prototype; one built, British civil registration G-ABSE.
High Speed Fury
Private venture. Single-seat high-speed trials and test aircraft, used as a prototype, which was developed into the Fury Mk II; one built.
Fury Mk II
Single-seat fighter version, powered by a 640 hp (480 kW) Rolls-Royce Kestrel VI piston engine. First flight 3 December 1936. Total 112 built.
Yugoslav Fury
Revised single-seat fighter for Yugoslavia, powered by 745 hp (556 kW) Kestrel XVI piston engine, and fitted with low drag radiator and Dowty cantilever undercarriage with internally sprung wheels. Provision for an additional two machine guns under wing. Ten made by Hawker delivered 1936–37, with a further 40 licence built in Yugoslavia by Ikarus (24) and Zmaj (16).
Persian Fury
Single-seat fighter for Persia (now Iran). 16 aircraft powered by a Pratt & Whitney Hornet S2B1g radial piston engine, driving a three-bladed propeller, ordered in January 1933. A further six aircraft powered by a 550 hp (410 kW) Bristol Mercury VISP radial piston engine, fitted with a two-bladed propeller, ordered in May 1934, with several Hornet powered Furys re-engined.
Norwegian Fury
One trial aircraft, fitted with a 530 hp (400 kW) Armstrong-Siddeley Panther IIIA radial piston engine; one built for Norway.
Portuguese Fury
Modified version of the Fury Mk.I, three aircraft fitted with a Rolls-Royce Kestrel II piston engine; three built for Portugal.
Spanish Fury
Improved version of the Fury Mk.I, three aircraft fitted with a 700 hp (520 kW) Hispano-Suiza 12Xbrs engine; three built for Spain.

== Surviving aircraft ==
=== Airworthy ===
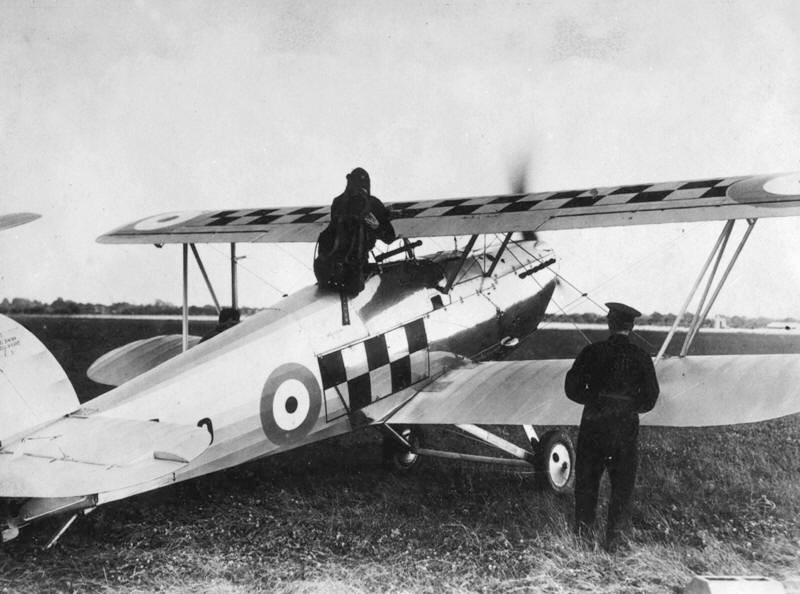
43 Squadron Hawker Fury

A Hawker Fury Mk.I, serial number K5674, is owned by the Historical Aircraft Collection and based at the Imperial War Museum Duxford in the United Kingdom. This aircraft was delivered to the RAF in 1935 and allocated to 43 Squadron, where it was flown until 1939 by Flying Officer Frederick Rosier, later to be Air Chief Marshal Sir Frederick Rosier. In 1940, it was sent to South Africa where it was flown by 13 Squadron (later 43 Squadron) of the South African Air Force. It was written off after making a forced landing, due to running out of fuel. It was returned to the United Kingdom in 2003 and restored to flying condition, with the civil registration G-CBZP. It made its first post-restoration flight in July 2012.

=== On display ===
A Hawker Fury Mk.I, serial number K1928, is being restored at Little Gransden Airfield to static display by the Cambridge Bomber and Fighter Society. The aircraft was part of the first production batch of 21 aircraft built in the 1930s and was flown by No. 43 Squadron. A replica Hawker Fury, serial number K1930, with an original Kestrel engine, is on display at the Military Aviation Museum of Virginia Beach, along with its successor, a Hawker Hurricane.

== Operators ==
Norway

- Norwegian Army Air Service operated one aircraft only.

Iran

- Imperial Iranian Air Force

Portugal

- Aeronáutica Militar

South Africa

- South African Air Force

Spain

- Spanish Air Force (3 Furies made it to Spain, 1 was operated by the Aviación Nacional/Spanish Republican Air Force)

United Kingdom

- Royal Air Force
  - No. 1 Squadron RAF – February 1932 to November 1938.
  - No. 25 Squadron RAF – February 1932 to October 1937.
  - No. 41 Squadron RAF – October 1937 to January 1939.
  - No. 43 Squadron RAF – May 1931 to January 1939.
  - No. 73 Squadron RAF – March 1937 to July 1937.
  - No. 87 Squadron RAF – March 1937 to June 1937.

Yugoslavia

- Royal Yugoslav Air Force imported 13 Furies, and built 40 under licence at the Zmaj (16) and Ikarus (24) factories. At the opening of the April 1941 Invasion of Yugoslavia, 25 Furies were operational:
- 35th Fighter group – Kosančić/Leskovac
  - 109 Fighter squadron – 6 Furies
  - 110 Fighter squadron – 5 Furies
- 36th Fighter group – Režanovačka Kosa
  - 111 Fighter squadron – 7 Furies
  - 112 Fighter squadron – 7 Furies

== Specifications (Hawker Fury Mk II) ==
Data from The British Fighter since 1912

General characteristics

- Crew: 1
- Length: 26 ft 9 in (8.15 m)
- Wingspan: 30 ft 0 in (9.14 m)
- Height: 10 ft 2 in (3.10 m)
- Wing area: 252 sq ft (23.4 m^{2})
- Empty weight: 2,734 lb (1,240 kg)
- Max takeoff weight: 3,609 lb (1,637 kg)
- Powerplant: 1 × Rolls-Royce Kestrel IV liquid-cooled V12 engine, 640 hp (480 kW)

Performance

- Maximum speed: 223 mph (359 km/h, 194 kn) at 16,500 ft (5,000 m)
- Range: 270 mi (430 km, 230 nmi)
- Service ceiling: 29,500 ft (9,000 m)
- Time to altitude: 3 min 50 s to 10,000 ft (3,000 m)

Armament

- Guns: 2 × 0.303 in (7.7 mm) Vickers Mk IV machine guns with 600 rpg

== See also ==
- Isaacs Fury

Related development

- Hawker Hart

Aircraft of comparable role, configuration, and era

- Avia B-534
- Blériot-SPAD S.510
- Fiat CR.32
- Kawasaki Ki-10
- Arado Ar 68

Related lists

- List of aircraft of the RAF
- List of aircraft of the Spanish Republican Air Force
