= Claudel-Hobson =

Series of British carburettors

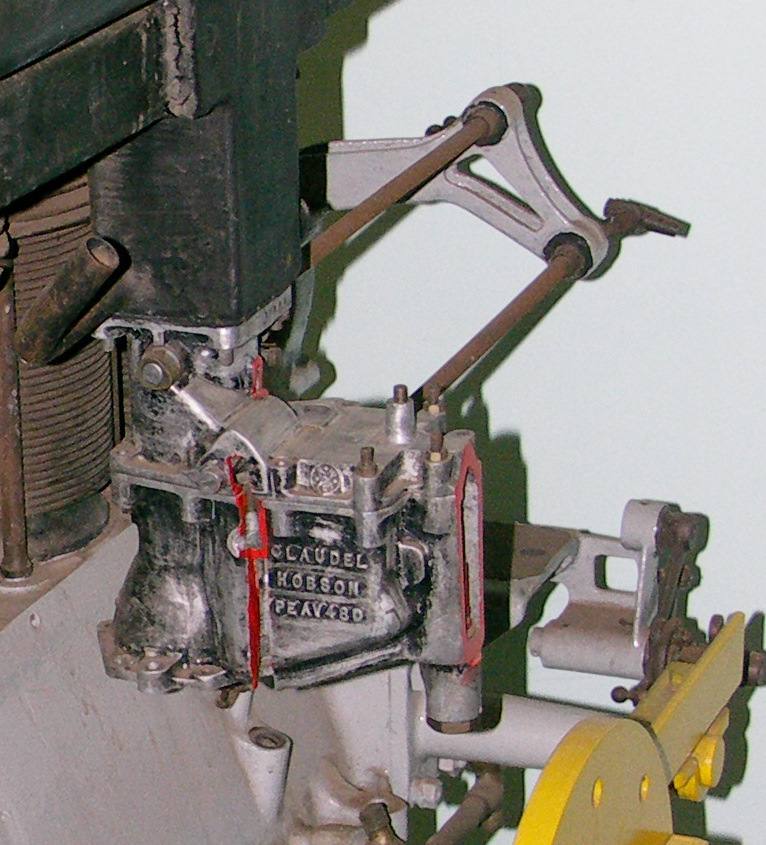
Claudel-Hobson PEAV48D carburettor on a de Havilland Gipsy aircraft engine

Claudel-Hobson was a series of British carburettors manufactured by H. M. Hobson Ltd.

Introduced in 1908, they were widely used on British car and aircraft engines in the early 20th century. Applications included Sunbeam automobiles as well as Armstrong Siddeley, Bristol, de Havilland, and Napier aircraft engines.
