= Bristol Bulldog =

1927 fighter aircraft family by Bristol

Type 105 Bulldog
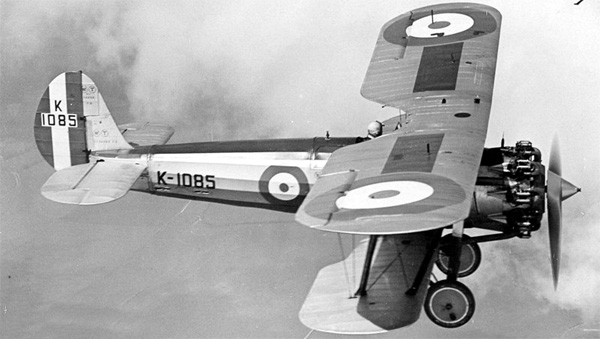

General information
- Type: Fighter
- Manufacturer: Bristol Aeroplane Company
- Designer: Frank Barnwell
- Primary users: Royal Air Force Latvian Air Force; Finnish Air Force; Royal Australian Air Force
- Number built: 443 (including prototypes and licence built)

History
- Introduction date: 1929
- First flight: 17 May 1927
- Retired: 1937

The Bristol Bulldog is a British Royal Air Force single-seat biplane fighter designed during the 1920s by the Bristol Aeroplane Company. More than 400 Bulldogs were produced for the RAF and overseas customers, and it was one of the most famous aircraft used by the RAF during the inter-war period.

== Background ==
The design of the Bulldog was the outcome of a series of design studies for fighters undertaken by Frank Barnwell during the 1920s. In 1924 Barnwell had started work on a fighter powered by the Rolls-Royce Falcon to meet the requirements of specification F.17/24. The project was shelved since Bristol preferred to use its own engine designs, but was revived in 1926 when Barnwell started work on a design, designated the Bristol 102, to meet either F.9/26 for a day-and-night fighter or N.21/26 for a shipborne fighter.

The Type 105 designation was first applied to a subsequent proposal for another aircraft to meet F.9/26 powered by the Mercury engine then under development at Bristol. These proposals looked promising enough for a pair of mock ups to be constructed for inspection by the Air Ministry in February 1927. The two aircraft were similar in design, the interceptor to specification F.17/24 design being slightly smaller and lighter and not equipped with radio. As a result, Bristol was asked to revise the design so that it met a later interceptor specification, F.20/27. Subsequently, a prototype aircraft, now called the Type 107 Bullpup was ordered for evaluation, but the other design did not gain official backing. Bristol considered it promising enough to build a prototype for the F.9/26 trials as a private venture, powered by a Bristol Jupiter because the supply of Mercurys was expected to be limited.

== Design and development ==
The Type 105 was an unequal span single bay biplane powered by a supercharged Bristol Jupiter VII air-cooled radial engine driving a two-bladed propeller. The structure was all-metal with a fabric covering, using members built up from rolled high-tensile steel strips riveted together. In order to ensure the maximum field of view there was a large semi-circular cut-out in the trailing edge of the upper wing and the inboard section of the lower was of reduced chord. Frise ailerons were fitted to the top wing only. It was armed with a pair of 0.303 in (7.7 mm) Vickers machine guns mounted one either side of the cockpit.

The prototype Bulldog first flew on 17 May 1927. Initial testing was entirely satisfactory and it was delivered to RAF Martlesham Heath in June. After consideration of all the types entered to meet the specification, the Bulldog and the Hawker Hawfinch were selected for more detailed evaluation. The manoeuvrability and strength of the Bulldog were praised by the RAF. It had poor spin recovery characteristics, which were remedied by fitting an enlarged fin and rudder but this led to difficulties in taxiing in a crosswind.

A second prototype with a lengthened rear fuselage was ordered for further evaluation in comparison with the Hawfinch. In this form, the Type 105A or Bulldog Mk. II, it was first flown by Cyril Uwins on 21 January 1928 and shortly afterwards delivered to Martlesham Heath. Performance was so close to that of the Hawfinch that a decision was deferred until the aircraft had been evaluated by service pilots; the eventual choice of the Bulldog was made largely because it was easier to maintain. An initial contract for 25 aircraft was placed: Bristol accordingly laid down 26 airframes, the extra one being intended as a company demonstration aircraft. The first of these were delivered on 8 May 1929 and deliveries were complete by 10 October.

Later production aircraft were of a refined version, the Mk. IIA with revised wing spars and a stronger fuselage, powered by the improved Jupiter VII F. One production aircraft was modified for use as an advanced trainer: after evaluation by the Central Flying School at Upavon this was ordered by the RAF, the production aircraft differing from the prototype in having slightly swept wings and an enlarged fin to improve spin recovery.

== Operational history ==
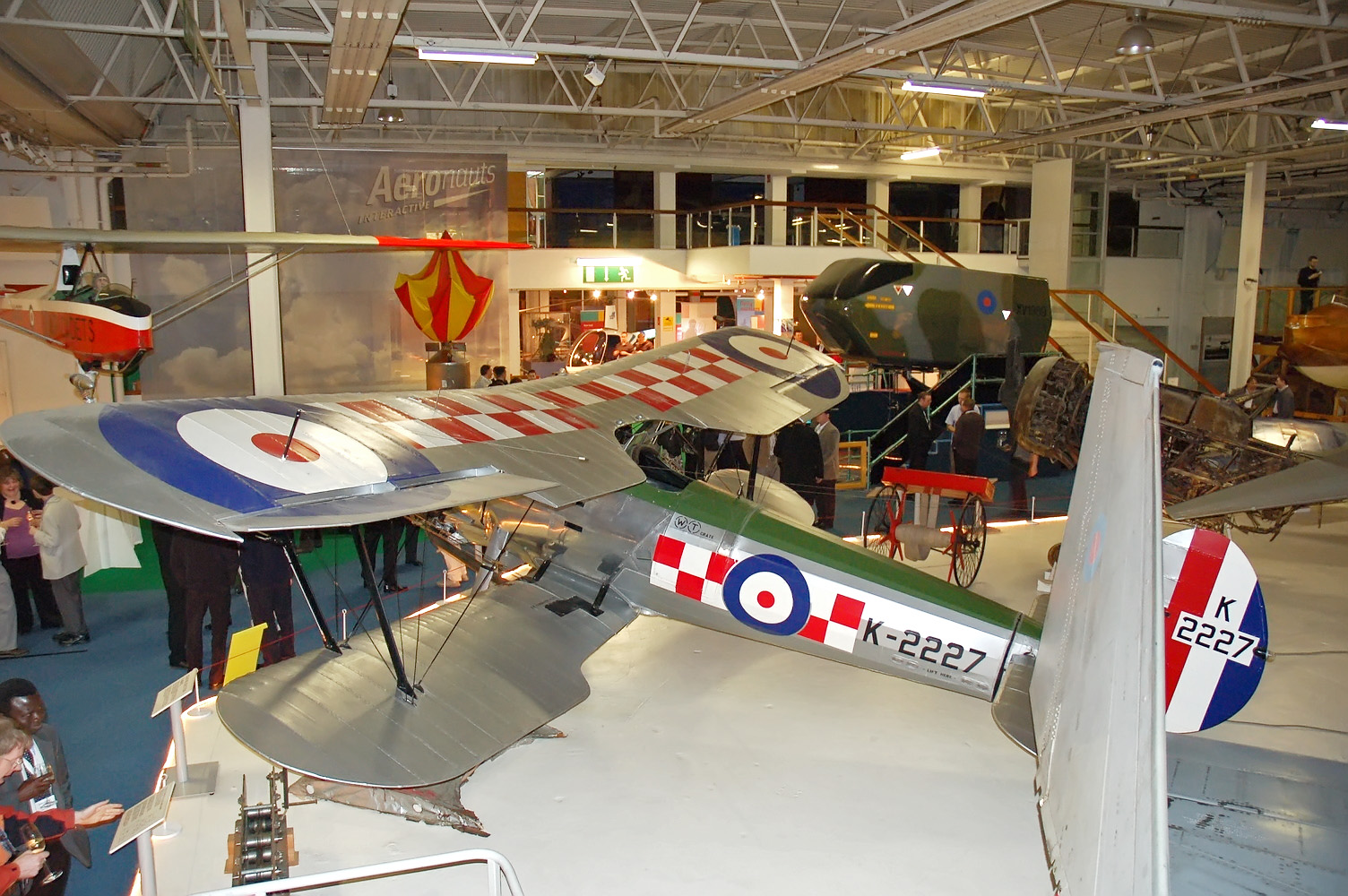
A Bristol Bulldog preserved at the RAF Museum, Hendon

The Bulldog never saw combat with the RAF, although during the Abyssinia Crisis of 1935–36, Bristol Bulldogs were sent to the Sudan to reinforce Middle East Command. Douglas Bader, better known for his Second World War actions, lost both of his legs when he crashed his Bristol Bulldog while he was performing unauthorised aerobatics at Woodley airfield near Reading. The Bulldog was withdrawn from RAF Fighter Command in July 1937, being primarily replaced by the Gloster Gauntlet. but continued to serve the RAF for a few years with Service Flying Training Schools. The Bulldog was exported to foreign air forces, seeing service with Australia, Denmark, Estonia, Finland, Japan, Latvia, Siam and Sweden.

In 1936, Latvia, intent on replacing its Bulldogs with more modern aircraft, sold 11 Bulldogs to Basque nationalist forces. These became part of the Spanish Republican Air Force in the Spanish Civil War; remaining in use until the Battle of Santander. Ten Bulldogs saw combat as part of the Finnish Air Force during the Winter War against the Soviet Union, which began in 1939. The Bulldogs fought against their Soviet opponent, gaining two kills by two pilots for the loss of one of their own, the types shot down being one Polikarpov I-16 and one Tupolev SB, both of which were superior in terms of technology compared to the Bulldog. The first aerial victory of the Finnish Air Force was achieved by a Bulldog piloted by SSgt Toivo Uuttu on 1 December 1939, over an I-16. The Bulldogs were used in advanced training during the subsequent Continuation War against the Soviet Union.

== Variants ==
Bulldog Mk. I
Single-seat day-and-night fighter prototype; two built.
High-altitude Bulldog
Modification of first prototype with enlarged wings intended for an attempt on the world altitude record.
Bulldog Mk. II
Second prototype and initial production version. Powered by a 440 hp (330 kW) Bristol Jupiter VII radial piston engine; 92 built by Bristol.
Bulldog Mk. IIA
Powered by a 490 hp (370 kW) Bristol Jupiter VIIF radial piston engine and revised detail design; 268 built by Bristol.
Bulldog Mk. IIIA
Development powered by a Bristol Mercury IV enclosed within a Townend ring with a revised wings and stronger fuselage. Only two built, one of which was converted to become the prototype Mk. IV.
Bulldog Mk. IVA
Development of the Mk.III to meet specification F.7/30 for a four-gun day-and-night fighter. Not ordered by the RAF but 17 sold to Finland, armed with two 7.7 mm Vickers guns; 18 built by Bristol.
Bulldog TM (Type 124)
Two-seat training version; 59 built. Powered by an Armstrong Siddeley Cheetah IX of 310 hp (230 kW).
"J.S.S.F." (Japanese Single-Seat Fighter)
Two aircraft licence-built by Nakajima Aircraft Works, Japan.
B.Kh.6
(Thai: บ.ข.๖) Royal Siamese Air Force designation for the Bulldog Mk. II.

== Operators ==
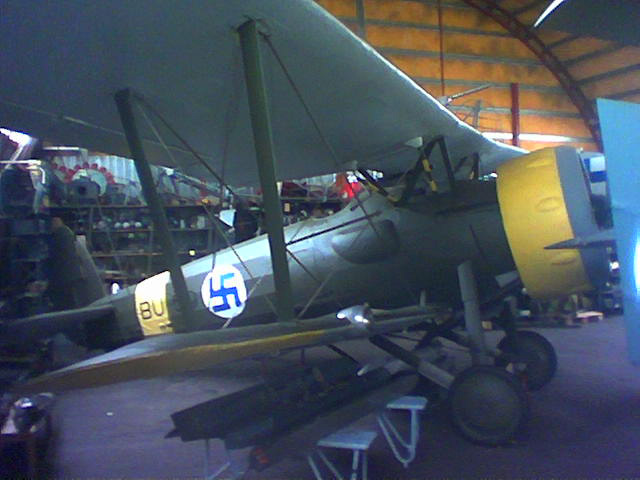
Bristol Bulldog preserved at the Hallinportti Aviation Museum.

Australia

- Royal Australian Air Force
  - No. 1 Squadron RAAF – Bulldog Mk. IIA
  - No. 2 Squadron RAAF – Bulldog Mk. IIA

Denmark

- Royal Danish Air Force

Estonia

- Estonian Air Force

Finland

- Finnish Air Force – Bulldog Mk. IVA

Japan

- Imperial Japanese Navy Air Service

Latvia

- Latvian Air Force

Siam (now Thailand)

- Royal Siamese Air Force Two bought for comparison purposes

Spanish Republic

- Spanish Republican Air Force

Sweden

- Royal Swedish Air Force Two remaining Bulldog Mk. IIA donated to Finland 1939

United Kingdom

- Royal Air Force
  - No. 3 Squadron RAF – May 1929 to July 1937
  - No. 17 Squadron RAF – October 1929 to August 1936
  - No. 19 Squadron RAF – September 1931 to January 1935
  - No. 23 Squadron RAF – July 1931 to April 1933
  - No. 24 Squadron RAF – One two-seat Bulldog was used by No. 24 (Communications) Squadron.
  - No. 29 Squadron RAF – June 1932 to April 1935
  - No. 32 Squadron RAF – January 1931 to July 1936
  - No. 41 Squadron RAF – October 1931 to August 1934
  - No. 54 Squadron RAF – April 1930 to September 1936
  - No. 56 Squadron RAF – October 1932 to May 1936
  - No. 111 Squadron RAF – January 1931 to July 1934
  - No. 1 Flying Training School
  - No. 3 Flying Training School
  - No. 5 Flying Training School
  - Central Flying School RAF
  - RAF College, Cranwell

United States

- United States Navy – The US Navy purchased two aircraft between 1929–1930. The aircraft were used for test and trials. During trial on 25 November 1929, one crashed near Bolling Field, killing its pilot, Lieutenant George T. Cuddihy.

== Surviving aircraft ==
Finland

- BU-59 – Bulldog IVA on static display at the Hallinportti Aviation Museum in Kuorevesi, Jämsä.

United Kingdom

- G-ABBB – Bulldog IIA on static display at the Royal Air Force Museum London in London. This aircraft was the civilian demonstrator and is painted as K2227. It was severely damaged in a crash in 1964 at the Farnborough Airshow and repaired in the late 1990s.

In addition an airworthy replica was constructed by Ed Storo of Tillamook, Oregon between 2000 and 2022. It is powered by a Pratt & Whitney R-1340 Wasp due to the scarcity of the original Bristol Jupiter engine.

== Specifications (Bulldog IIa) ==
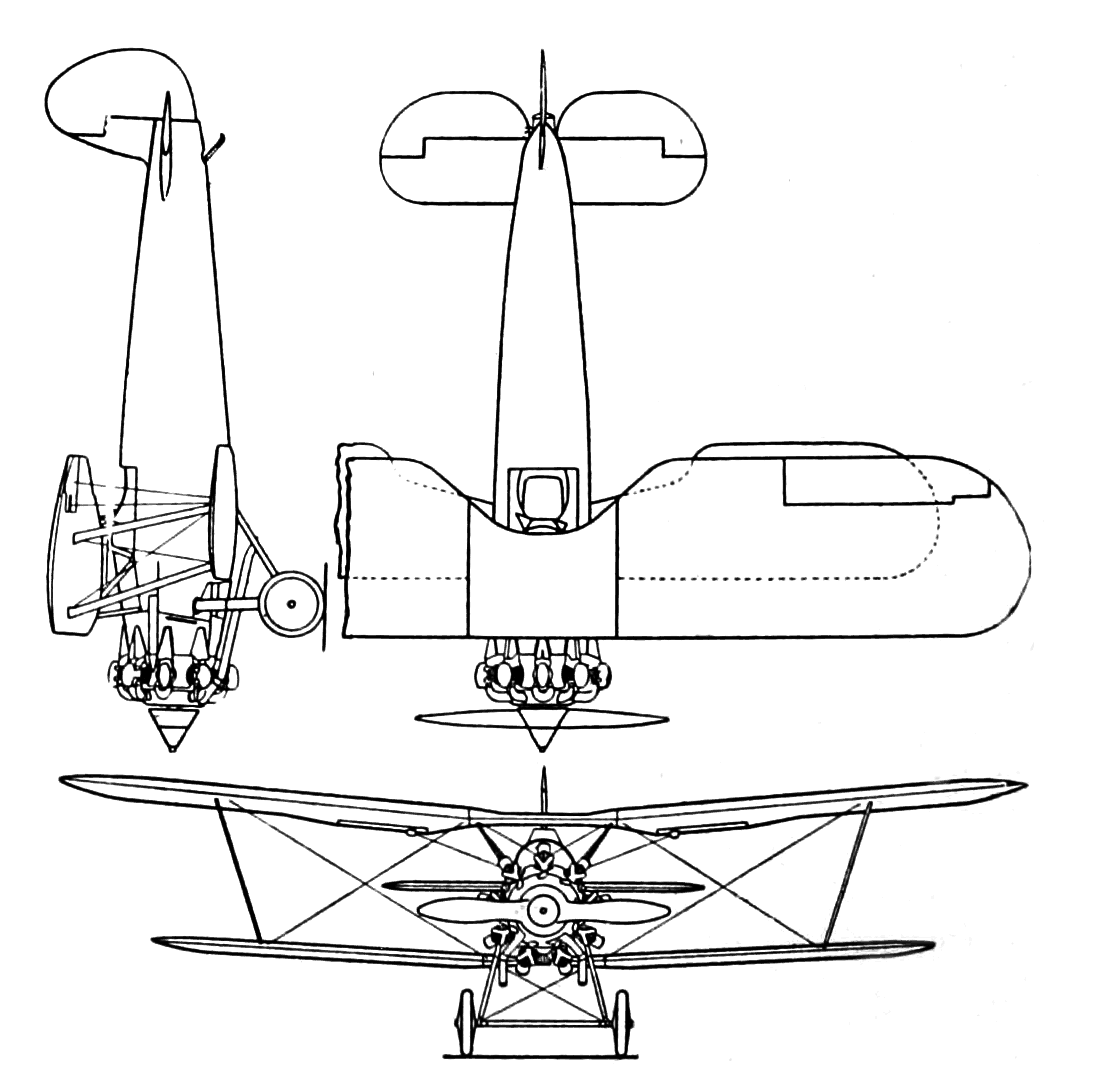
Bristol Bulldog 3-view drawing from Aero Digest November,1930

Data from Bristol Aircraft Since 1910

General characteristics

- Crew: 1
- Length: 25 ft 2 in (7.67 m)
- Wingspan: 33 ft 10 in (10.31 m)
- Height: 8 ft 9 in (2.67 m)
- Wing area: 307 sq ft (28.5 m^{2})
- Airfoil: Bristol 1A, both wings. Barnes and Luff books incorrect, may have been referencing the Bristol Pup
- Empty weight: 2,205 lb (1,000 kg)
- Max takeoff weight: 3,490 lb (1,583 kg)
- Powerplant: 1 × Bristol Jupiter VIIF 9-cylinder air-cooled radial piston engine, 490 hp (370 kW)
- Propellers: 2-bladed wooden fixed-pitch propeller

Performance

- Maximum speed: 178 mph (286 km/h, 155 kn)
- Service ceiling: 29,300 ft (8,900 m)

Armament

- Guns: 2 × 0.303 in (7.7 mm) Vickers machine guns
- Bombs: 4 × 20 lb (9 kg) bombs

== See also ==
Aircraft of comparable role, configuration, and era

- Gloster Gamecock
- Gloster Grebe
- Hawker Woodcock

Related lists

- List of aircraft of the Royal Air Force
- List of aircraft of the Spanish Republican Air Force
- List of fighter aircraft

== Bibliography ==
- Andrews, C.F. The Bristol Bulldog (Aircraft in Profile No.6). Leatherhead: Profile Publications Ltd., 1965. OCLC 705729015
- Barnes, C.H. Bristol Aircraft Since 1910. London: Putnam, 1964. OCLC 11742314
- "The Bulldog Breed" Part II. Air Enthusiast, Vol. 4, No. 2, February 1973, pp. 91–95. Bromley, UK: Fine Scroll. ISSN 0143-5450
- Crawford. Alex. Bristol Bulldog, Gloster Gauntlet. Sandomierz, Poland/Redbourn, UK: Mushroom Model Publications, 2005. ISBN 83-89450-04-6.
- Delve, Ken. Fighter Command 1936–1968: An Operational and Historical Record. Barnsley, South Yorkshire, UK: Pen & Sword, 2008. ISBN 978-1-84415-613-9.
- Gerdessen, Frederik. "Estonian Air Power 1918 – 1945". Air Enthusiast, No. 18, April – July 1982. pp. 61–76. ISSN 0143-5450.
- Granger, Alfred. The Bristol Bulldog (Data Plan No. 2). Hamburg, Germany: Taurus Press, 1973.
- Keskinen, Kalevi, Niska, Klaus, Stenman Kari and Geust, Carl-Frederik. Suomen museolentokoneet (Museum Aircraft in Finland). Espoo, Tietoteos, 1981. ISBN 951-9035-60-5.
- López, Rafael A. Permuy and Artemio Mortera Pérez. Bristol "Bulldog" (I) (Perfiles Aeronáuticos: La Máquina y la Historia 8) (in Spanish). Valladolid, Spain: Quiron Ediciones, 2006. ISBN 84-96016-03-X.
- López, Rafael A. Permuy and Artemio Mortera Pérez. Bristol "Bulldog" (II) (Perfiles Aeronáuticos: La Máquina y la Historia 9) (in Spanish). Valladolid, Spain: Quiron Ediciones, 2006. ISBN 84-96016-04-8.
- Lumsden, Alec. "On Silver Wings – Part 11". Aeroplane Monthly, Vol 19 No 8, August 1991. pp. 458–463. ISSN 0143-7240
- Mason, Francis K. The British Fighter since 1912. Annapolis, Maryland: Naval Institute Press, 1992. ISBN 1-55750-082-7.
- Thetford, Owen. "On Silver Wings – Part 12". Aeroplane Monthly, Vol 19 No 9, September 1991. pp. 522–528. ISSN 0143-7240
