= Martin-Baker MB 1 =

British low-wing monoplane

MB 1
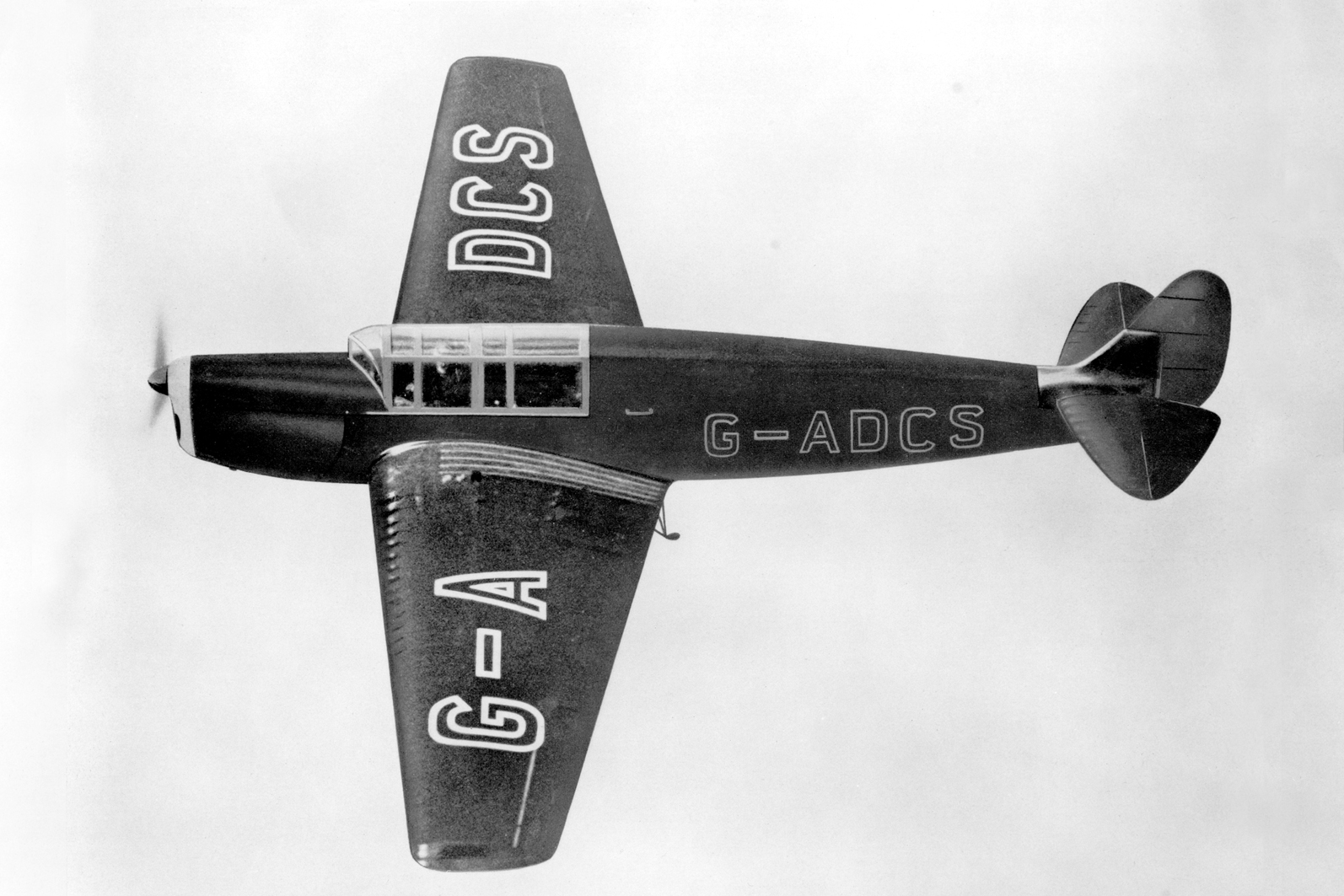
- Martin-Baker MB1 during testing

General information
- Type: Light aircraft
- Manufacturer: Martin-Baker
- Designer: James Martin
- Status: Experimental
- Number built: 1

History
- First flight: April 1935
- Variant: Martin-Baker MB 2

The Martin-Baker MB 1 was a British low-wing light aircraft, designed and constructed in the 1930s, the first aircraft design of the Martin-Baker company to be built. While not a fighter itself, the design would heavily influence Martin-Baker’s WWII-era prototype fighters, the MB 2, the MB 3, and the MB 5.

== Design and development ==
Formed in 1934 by James Martin and Captain Valentine Baker, the Martin-Baker company had embarked initially on an unsuccessful two-place low-wing monoplane design known as the MB 1 before completing an autogyro design by Mr. Raoul Hafner tested by Captain Baker at Heston Aerodrome.

Attracting financial aid from a business friend with an interest in aviation, Martin turned to the design and manufacture of a small, two-seater touring aircraft bearing the same designation as the earlier project. Departing from the unconventional mid-engine configuration, the new aircraft was nonetheless an example of an advanced design.

Construction involved a simple but highly ingenious method of using round section thin gauge steel tubing throughout the structure with a fabric covering. Powered by a neatly cowled six-cylinder inline 160 hp Napier Javelin engine driving a fixed-pitch wooden propeller, the tubular mounting was designed so that all parts were accessible for easy servicing and was electrically started. A simple, tubular construction undercarriage carried low pressure tyres and employed shock absorber struts.

Martin believed that simplicity would lead to efficiency and took care to eliminate complicated operations, with the result that the prototype was rapidly put together by a small group of 12 semi-skilled workers. This design philosophy was carried throughout the simple structure with much forethought given to its cockpit and general layout. The wings were also designed to fold rearwards as a one-person operation, for ease of storage. Long triangular welded-aluminium fuel tanks, designed to be quickly detachable, were carried in the centre of each wing spar.

Although the main interest of this aircraft was in its design, a contemporary aeronautical journal reported: "The seats are comfortable and the cockpit is totally enclosed with an oval transparent hood. The windscreen is a sharp vee, with vertical front panes, which should not collect fine rain or snow and should obviate any reflection from internal or external lighting."

== Testing and evaluation ==
Aerodynamically a straightforward design, when flight tested in April 1935, the MB 1 (G-ADCS) reached a top speed of 125 miles per hour (201 km/h) and was found to possess pleasant flight characteristics, which became a hallmark of Martin-Baker designs. The Chief Test Pilot for the MB 1 was Captain Baker.

Although the MB 1 prototype was destroyed in a fire at the works hangar in Denham, Uxbridge in March 1938, many valuable lessons learned during its design, construction and testing were drawn on in the production of the company's next design, the MB 2.

== Specifications ==
Data from British civil aircraft 1919-1972 Volume III

General characteristics

- Crew: 2
- Length: 28 ft 10.5 in (8.801 m)
- Wingspan: 37 ft 0 in (11.28 m)
- Wing area: 206 sq ft (19.1 m^{2})
- Airfoil: Clark Y
- Powerplant: 1 × Napier Javelin IIIA 6-cylinder air-cooled inverted in-line piston engine, 160 hp (120 kW)
- Propellers: 2-bladed variable-pitch propeller
