= Martin-Baker MB 2 =

British fighter prototype

MB 2
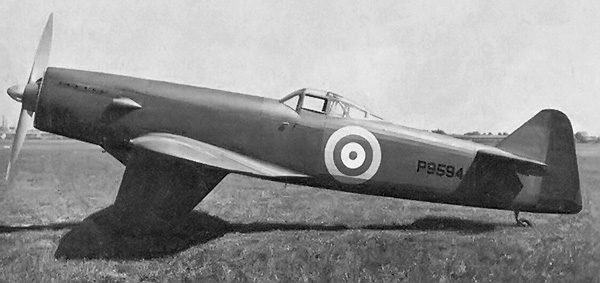
- Martin-Baker MB2 during testing

General information
- Type: Fighter
- Manufacturer: Martin-Baker
- Designer: James Martin
- Status: Experimental
- Number built: 1

History
- First flight: 3 August 1938
- Developed from: Martin-Baker MB 1
- Developed into: Martin-Baker MB 3

The Martin-Baker MB 2 was a British private-venture fighter prototype based on a simple basic structure that had been developed in the earlier MB 1 civil aircraft. Although briefly evaluated as a fighter by the Royal Air Force, the MB 2 was limited in design potential and never entered series production.

== Design and development ==
James Martin, broadly responding to Specification F.5/34 for a fighter using an air-cooled engine for hot climates, designed a fighter using the simple basic structure employed and developed in his earlier MB 1. Constructed of steel tubing, the MB 2 incorporated many detailed improvements which further simplified production as well as repair and maintenance. Powered by a special Napier Dagger III HIM 24-cylinder H-type engine of 805 nominal bhp, but capable of operation at 13 lb boost to give over 1,000 hp for takeoff, driving a fixed-pitch, two-blade propeller, the MB 2 was capable of 300+ mph (480 km/h) speeds "on paper." The undercarriage was fixed but cleanly faired in two trouser-type fairings, the port one carrying the oil-cooler. A retractable undercarriage to improve performance was "in the works" when the design was abandoned.

The fuselage lines were square cut and exceptionally clean, with almost constant depth from nose to tail. An unusual feature, at that time, was that the fuselage was slightly longer than the wingspan, a feature retained in later Martin-Baker designs, which contributed to good stability and control in yaw.

One of the hallmarks of Martin-Baker designs was the simple but efficient installation of main systems. The clean and orderly cockpit was set well back, allowing a good view downwards behind the wing. A crash post was fitted, which automatically extended to minimise structure damage and injury to the pilot in the event of a nose-over landing. A small, tapered tailplane was mounted on the top of the fuselage well forward of the stern post, while the fin and rudder combination was roughly triangular in side elevation. This arrangement placed most of the effective rudder area below the tailplane, thus providing an adequate balance to the keel surface and assuring good recovery from spins. In initial MB 2 configurations, there was no fin and the rudder was mounted on the fuselage but lateral stability was unsatisfactory, with the fixed fin added later.

== Operational history ==
=== Testing and evaluation ===
The MB 2 was first flown by Captain Valentine Baker at Harwell on 3 August 1938 and initially tested with markings MB-1 (G-AEZD not carried). The Aeroplane stated, "[I]n spite of its fixed undercarriage, the MB 2 had a performance as good as that of contemporary fighters and a capacity for quick and cheap production by the simplicity of its structure and easy assembly". Repair and maintenance were also simple, and these factors might have influenced the authorities towards putting the MB 2 into production when the country's fighter strength was disproportionately low.

The MB 2 was subsequently acquired by the Air Ministry in June 1939 as P9594 and returned to A&AEE for a second assessment after modifications were made to tail control surfaces. The MB 2 also spent some time at the Air Fighting Development Unit (AFDU), RAF Northolt, before returning to Martin-Baker late in 1939, where it still survived in December 1941, although probably flown little or not at all after the outbreak of war.

Around this time Martin was considering various other ideas, both for complete aircraft and for certain components. The aircraft designs included a twin-engined 12-gun fighter and a twin-engined multi-seat transport, both featuring the finless layout of the early MB 2 airframe. In the fighter design, the trailing edge of the engine nacelles provided additional vertical control surfaces, and also incorporated the patented ducting system evolved by Martin to reduce drag caused by the engine exhaust. The most promising of the concepts became the MB 3 which would eventually spawn the superlative MB 5 prototype.

== Specifications (MB 2) ==
Data from The British Fighter since 1912

General characteristics

- Crew: 1
- Length: 34 ft 9 in (10.59 m)
- Wingspan: 34 ft 0 in (10.36 m)
- Height: 9 ft 9 in (2.97 m)
- Wing area: 212 sq ft (19.7 m^{2})
- Gross weight: 5,537 lb (2,512 kg)
- Powerplant: 1 × Napier Dagger III H-24 air-cooled piston engine, 1,000 hp (750 kW)
- Propellers: 2-bladed fixed-pitch wooden propeller, 10 ft 6 in (3.20 m) diameter

Performance

- Maximum speed: 305 mph (491 km/h, 265 kn)
- Service ceiling: 29,000 ft (8,800 m)
- Rate of climb: 2,200 ft/min (11 m/s)
- Wing loading: 26.1 lb/sq ft (127 kg/m^{2})
- Power/mass: 0.18 hp/lb (0.30 kW/kg)

Armament

- Guns: 8 × .303 inch (7.7 mm) Browning Mark II machine guns

== See also ==
Related development

- Martin-Baker MB 1
- Martin-Baker MB 3

Aircraft of comparable role, configuration, and era

- Bristol Type 146
- Gloster G.38
- Vickers Venom
- Curtiss P-36
- Hawker Hurricane
- Messerschmitt Bf 109
- Miles M.20
- Supermarine Spitfire
