= Martin-Baker MB 3 =

British fighter prototype

MB 3
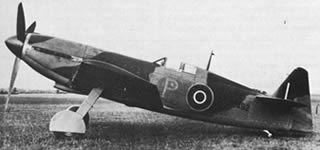

General information
- Type: Fighter
- Manufacturer: Martin-Baker
- Designer: James Martin
- Status: Experimental
- Primary user: Royal Air Force (intended)
- Number built: 1

History
- First flight: 31 August 1942
- Developed from: Martin-Baker MB 1 Martin-Baker MB 2
- Developed into: Martin-Baker MB 5

The Martin-Baker MB 3 was a British prototype fighter aircraft, developed from Martin-Baker’s earlier private ventures, the MB 1 and the MB 2. The design was notable for its heavy armament of six 20 mm Hispano cannons. The fatal crash of the only prototype in September 1942 led to the cancellation of the programme. The design would carry over into a planned MB 4, but this cancelled in favour of a moderate re-design in the form of the MB 5.

== Design and development ==
Using lessons learned from the MB 1 and MB 2, James Martin and Captain Valentine Baker capitalised in developing the design and construction to produce a new design, the MB 3, which was powered by a 2,000 hp Napier Sabre 24-cylinder, H-type engine, driving a de Havilland variable-pitch three-bladed propeller. The MB 3 was to meet an Air Ministry specification for a fighter. It was armed with six 20 millimetres (0.79 in) cannon mounted in the wings, each with 200 rounds of ammunition, which made it the most heavily armed fighter in existence: for ease of maintenance the armament was easily accessible. Three were ordered to Specification F.18/39 which was written for the design and issued in May 1939.

While retaining the essential characteristics of the earlier designs, MB 3 included many new features: the fuselage primary structure was still the round steel tube arrangement but metal panels had taken the place of wood and fabric of earlier models. The wing construction integrated torsion-box construction and a laminated steel spar, would give a strong and stiff structure with minimum flexing. Attention to detail extended to a Martin-designed pneumatically controlled undercarriage that was simple, sturdy, effective and reliable. With the wing flaps also pneumatically operated, the need for hydraulics, with all their attendant operational hazards and maintenance problems, was eliminated. Underwing radiators had the coolant radiator on the starboard and the oil cooler on the port side.

== Testing and evaluation ==
Then listed as "Experimental Aeroplane No.120" and with the serial number R2492, the MB 3 was temporarily stationed at 26 OTU (Operational Training Unit) at RAF Wing in Buckinghamshire for trials and first flew on 31 August 1942. The tests were supervised by Group Captain Snaith and observed by, amongst others, Air Vice Marshals Francis John Linnell (Controller of Research and Development at the Ministry of Aircraft Production) and Burton. Following its successful first flight, undertaken by Captain Baker, the next series of test flights revealed the MB 3 to be highly manoeuvrable and easy to fly, but on 12 September 1942, the engine failed soon after take-off and Captain Baker, trying to save the aircraft by executing a difficult forced landing, crashed in a field and was killed.

The Unit Report states, "Capt. Baker had just got airborne, when he had immediate loss of power. In trying to save the aircraft, he made a forced landing in a field, but hit a tree stump and was killed."

The subsequent Court of Inquiry found the cause to be "...engine failure due to a broken sleeve drive crank in the engine." Rumours suggested that the Napier Sabre engine used had been overheating on the ground. Ground-crew George Bignall recalled "Although nobody was allowed into the aircraft hangar, we were able to see it during its testing time. It was very fast, with Captain Baker flying very close to us at times, shooting up the runway very low." Of the day of the accident he said, "I was doing a modification on dispersals, when Captain Baker took off towards Stewkley. I watched him climb, then, suddenly, the engine cut out and he crashed, trying to land."

Civilian John Thornton also witnessed the accident,

Two fields from where Morris and I were harvesting, there was a stack of newly-threshed straw. The MB3 hit this and burst into flame. 'Bunny' Winter, the bailiff of Cold Harbour Farm, beat us to the crash, but we were too late to rescue Captain Baker in the fierce fire.

The Unit Report states that Mr Winter actually managed to remove Capt. Baker's body from the aircraft.

Due to various delays and late delivery, the Ministry considered the design outdated and there was no production order.

Despite the loss of the sole prototype, the MB 3 design was not abandoned and Martin decided to design the MB 4, powered by a Griffon engine. This project was eventually dropped in favour of an entirely new design, which became the Martin-Baker MB 5.

== Legacy ==
The MB 3 design could have been developed into a good fighter aircraft. Martin felt the personal loss of his best friend and partner and "many consider that it was this painful tragedy that really fired the passionate interest in the safety of aircrews, which was later to become the very pivot of his life". He devoted the remainder of his life to the invention and development of the Martin-Baker ejection seats (the company retained the name Martin-Baker as a tribute to their lost co-founder).

== Specifications (MB 3) ==
Orthographic projection of the Sabre-powered MB3.

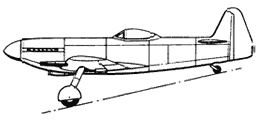
Profile of the redesigned Griffon-powered MB4.

Data from Jane’s Fighting Aircraft of World War II, British Aircraft of World War II

General characteristics

- Crew: 1
- Length: 35 ft 0 in (10.67 m)
- Wingspan: 35 ft 4 in (10.77 m)
- Height: 15 ft 0 in (4.57 m)
- Wing area: 262 sq ft (24.3 m^{2})
- Empty weight: 9,233 lb (4,188 kg)
- Gross weight: 11,497 lb (5,215 kg)
- Max takeoff weight: 12,090 lb (5,484 kg)
- Powerplant: 1 × Napier Sabre H-24 liquid-cooled piston engine, 2,000 hp (1,500 kW)
- Propellers: 3-bladed de Havilland-Hydromatic constant-speed propeller

Performance

- Maximum speed: 415 mph (668 km/h, 361 kn) at 20,000 ft (6,100 m)
- Range: 1,100 mi (1,800 km, 960 nmi)
- Service ceiling: 40,000 ft (12,000 m)
- Rate of climb: 3,800 ft/min (19 m/s)

Armament

- Guns: 6× 20 mm Hispano Mk.II cannon

== See also ==
Related development

- Martin-Baker MB 2
- Martin-Baker MB 5

Aircraft of comparable role, configuration, and era

- CAC CA-15
- Hawker Sea Fury
- Messerschmitt Me 309
- North American P-51 Mustang
- Supermarine Spiteful
