= Hispano-Suiza HS.404 =

20 mm autocannon

HS.404
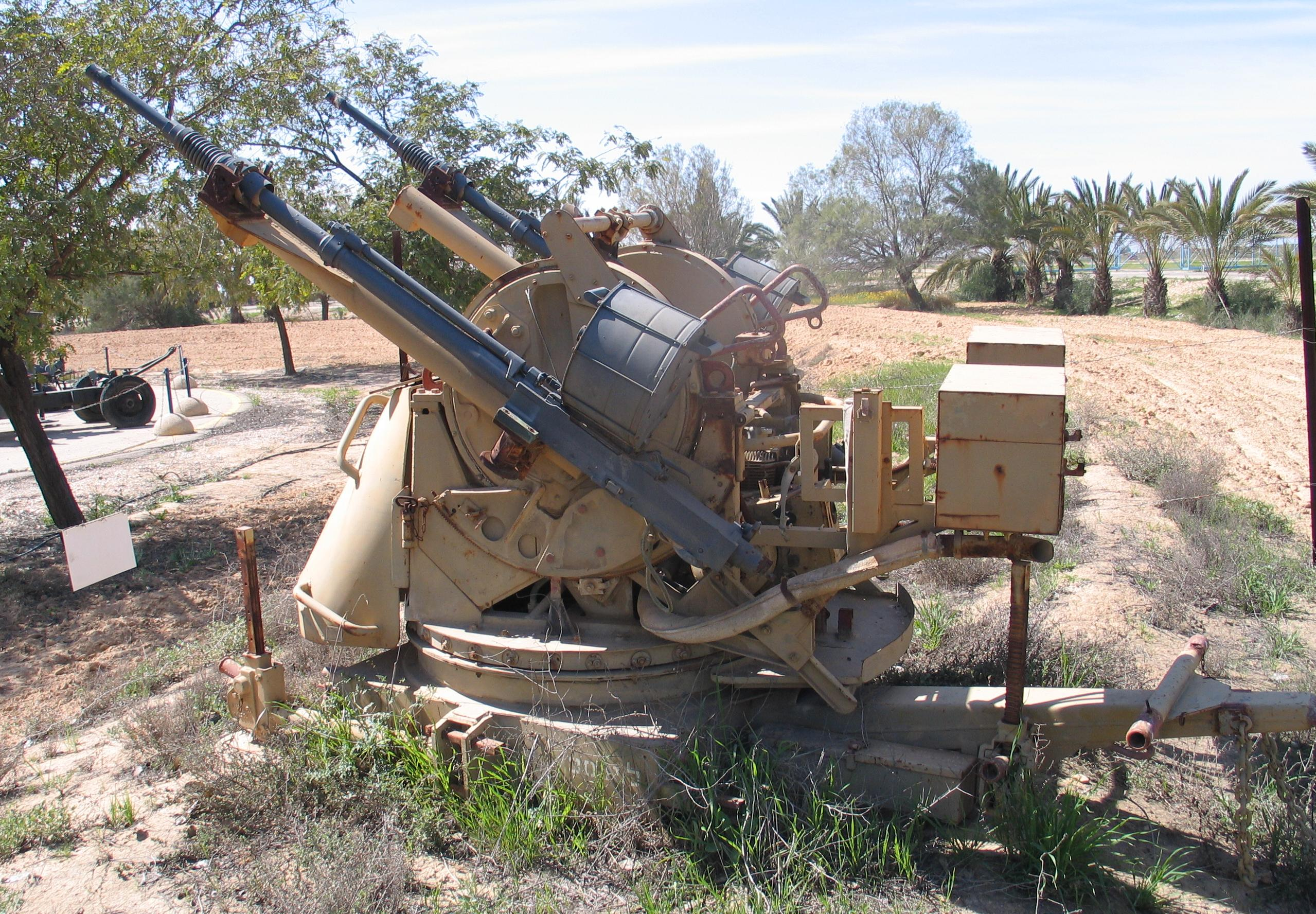
- HS.404 in the TCM-20 twin anti-aircraft configuration, displayed at the Israeli Air Force Museum
- Type: Aircraft cannon
- Place of origin: Switzerland; France

Service history
- Wars: World War II; Korean War; Rhodesian Bush War; Six Day War; Yom Kippur War

Production history
- Designer: Marc Birkigt
- Manufacturer: Hispano-Suiza

Specifications
- Mass: 49 kg (108 lb 0 oz)
- Length: 2.52 m (8 ft 3 in)
- Barrel length: 1.7 m (5 ft 7 in)
- Cartridge: 20×110mm
- Calibre: 20 mm (0.79 in)
- Action: Gas operated
- Rate of fire: 700-750 rounds/min
- Muzzle velocity: 840–880 m/s (2,800–2,900 ft/s)
- Feed system: Drum magazine, belt (later models)

20 mm M1 automatic gun
- Type: Aircraft cannon
- Place of origin: France

Service history
- In service: United States Army Air Forces
- Used by: United Kingdom, France, Spain, US
- Wars: World War II; Korean War; Six Day War; Yom Kippur War

Production history
- Manufacturer: International Harvester
- Produced: 1941 – April 1942
- Variants: A/N M2, A/N M3, M24

Specifications
- Mass: 29.3 kg (65 lb) (breech mechanism); 21.5 kg (47 lb) (barrel with muzzle brake); 10 kg (22 lb) (loaded 60-round M1 drum magazine); 8.6 kg (19 lb) (M1 feed mechanism)
- Length: 2.54 m (100 in)
- Barrel length: 1.710 m (5 ft 7.3 in); Rifling: 9 grooves, right-hand twist, 1:160 cm (1-in-63 inches) turn
- Cartridge: 20×110mm Hispano "A"
- Calibre: 20 mm (0.79 in)
- Action: Gas unlocked, delayed blowback
- Rate of fire: 650–700 rounds/min
- Muzzle velocity: 870 m/s (2,900 ft/s)
- Maximum firing range: 6,500 m (7,000 yd)
- Feed system: 60-round M1 drum or linked belt

Hispano Mk.V
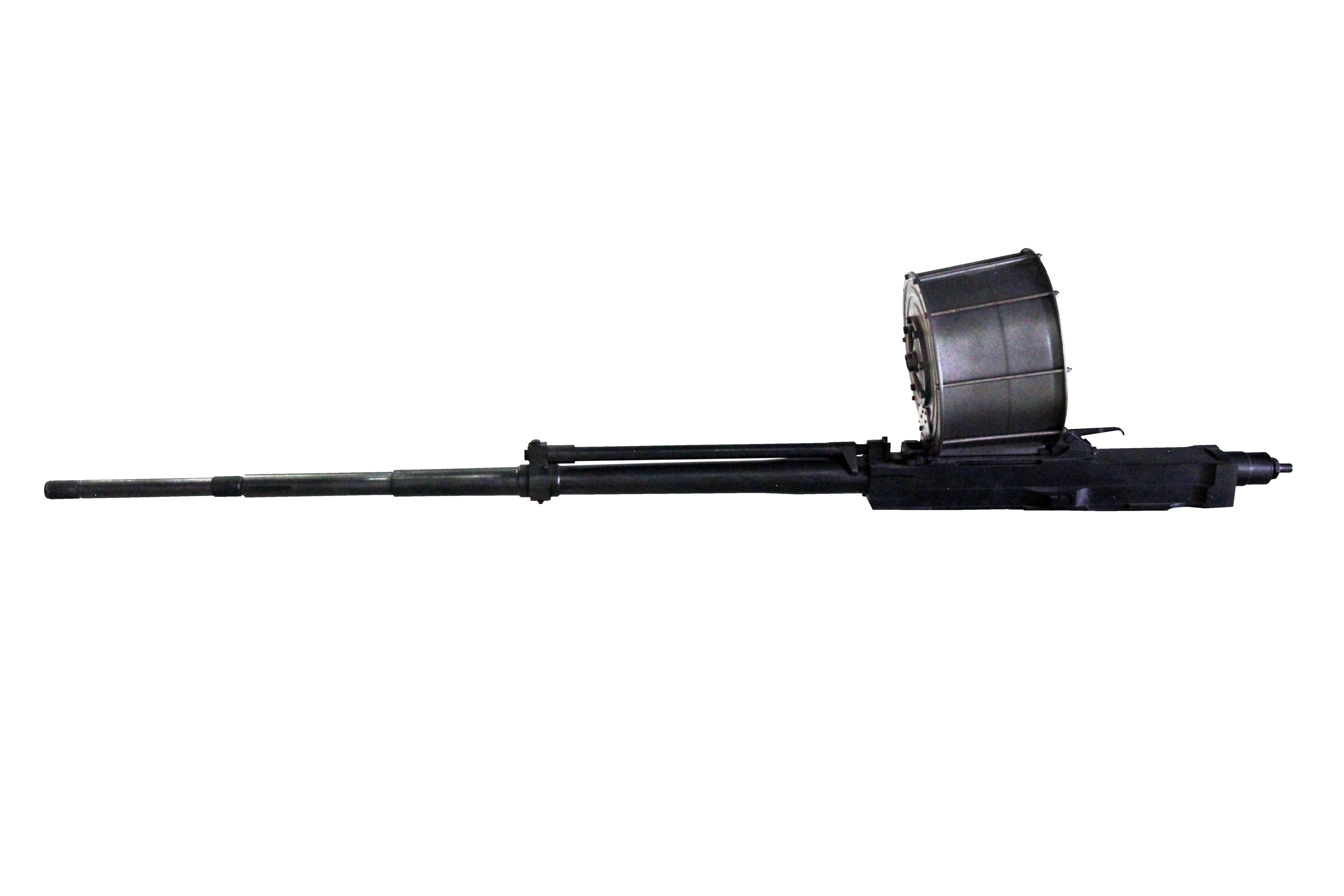
- 20 mm Hispano-Suiza Mk V on display at the Imperial War Museum Duxford
- Type: Aircraft cannon
- Place of origin: United Kingdom

Service history
- Used by: United Kingdom & British Empire, Commonwealth, United States
- Wars: World War II; Korean War; Rhodesian Bush War; Six Day War; Yom Kippur War

Specifications
- Mass: 38 kg (83 lb 12 oz)
- Length: 2.184 m (7 ft 2.0 in)
- Barrel length: 1.333 m (4 ft 4.5 in)
- Cartridge: 20×110mm
- Calibre: 20 mm (0.79 in)
- Action: Gas unlocked, delayed blowback
- Rate of fire: 700-750 rounds/min
- Muzzle velocity: 840 m/s (2,800 ft/s)
- Feed system: Belt

The HS.404 is an autocannon originally designed by and produced by the Swiss arm of the Spanish–Swiss company Hispano-Suiza in the mid-1930s. Production was later moved to the French arm of Hispano-Suiza.

It was widely used as an aircraft, naval and land-based weapon by French, British, American and other military services, particularly during World War II. The cannon is also referred to as Birkigt type 404, after its designer Marc Birkigt and later versions based on British development are known as 20 mm Hispano.

Firing a 20 mm calibre projectile, it delivered a significant load of explosive from a relatively light weapon. This made it an ideal anti-aircraft weapon for mounting on light vehicles, as well as a fighter aircraft gun, supplementing or replacing the 7.62 mm (.30 calibre) and .303 inch (7.7 mm) machine guns commonly used in military aircraft of the 1930s. The HS.404 was produced by the French subsidiary of Hispano-Suiza, and under license by a variety of companies in other countries.

== Development ==
=== From Oerlikon to Hispano ===
The first widely used 20 mm aircraft cannon was the Becker model, introduced into German service in World War I. The Becker introduced the advanced primer ignition blowback (API) design for autocannon, a concept that was quickly taken up by other companies. Notable among the resulting designs was the Swiss Oerlikon FF S, which was based on the Becker but introduced a number of improvements. In the 1930s, Hispano-Suiza was asked to develop a 20 mm cannon to fire through the propeller shaft (as a moteur-canon SS) of a gear-reduction inline aviation engine like the Hispano-Suiza 8BeC. They took out a license on the Oerlikon FF S and made minor modifications to produce the Hispano-Suiza Automatic Cannon Type HS.7 and HS.9. Shortly after production began, the Hispano-Suiza and Oerlikon companies disagreed over patent rights and their business connection came to an end.

In 1933, the chief engineer of Hispano-Suiza, Marc Birkigt, began work on the design of a new weapon to replace the Oerlikon contract, based on a locking mechanism patented in 1919 by the Swedish-American machine-gun designer Gustaf Swebilius. The result was the Type 404 or HS.404. While the HS.404 resembled the parent Oerlikon FF S in many respects, its repeating mechanism was a gas-operated locking bolt.

On firing the 404, when the projectile passes a hole cut in the barrel, about halfway along its length, high-pressure gas behind the projectile is siphoned off and operates a piston that drives a rod, running along the top of the barrel, back against a cam on the bolt, unlocking it and allowing the remaining high pressure gases in the barrel to propel it and the spent cartridge backwards in a delayed sequence that allows the bolt to remain closed until the projectile has exited from the barrel. This maximizes muzzle velocity and since the bolt was locked during firing, it could be lighter than that of the Oerlikon, thus facilitating an increase in rate of fire to 700 rounds per minute (rpm), a gain of about 200 rpm. In 1938, Birkigt patented it and started production in their Geneva factory.

=== Anti-aircraft gun ===
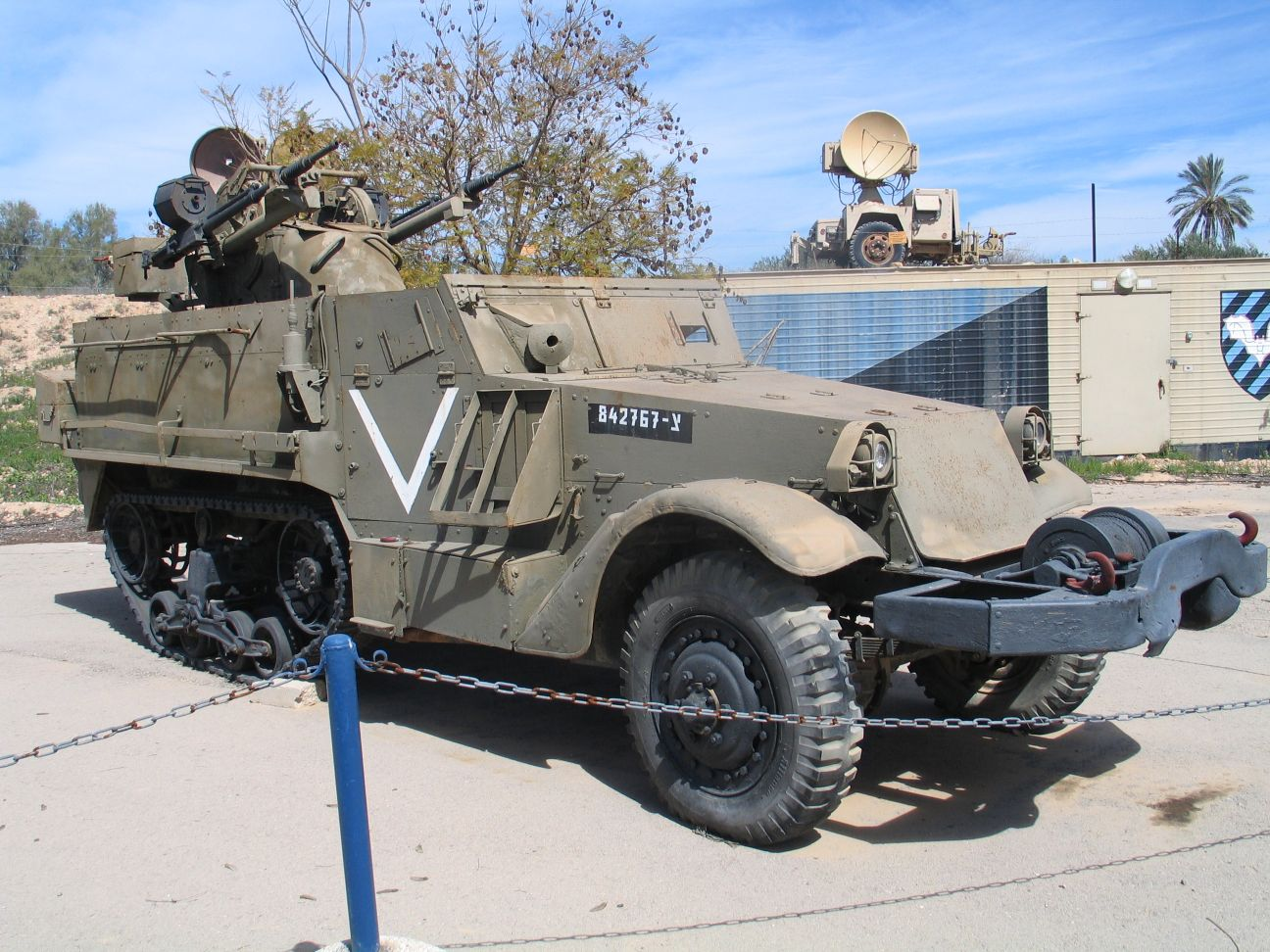
Israeli anti-aircraft M3 Half-track with twin H.S. 404 auto-cannons

The HS.404's predecessor, the Oerlikon type S auto-cannon, was rather heavy, and the movement of the heavy bolt made it best suited in static and maritime anti-aircraft defence. The lighter bolt of the HS.404 made it well suited to mounting on vehicles. The M16, an anti-aircraft version of the M3 Half-track, could be equipped with single or double American-made copies of the Hispano-Suiza auto-cannon. This variant of the M3 Half-track was used by US and Commonwealth forces late in the Second World War, in the Korean War and was further developed by Israel in the post-war era.

=== Aircraft gun ===
In 1938, an aircraft based version of the HS.404 was produced at the request of the French government. It was installed on a wide range of pre-war French fighter aircraft, notably in installations firing through the propeller shaft of the Hispano-Suiza 12Y engine, a system referred to as a moteur-canon (engine cannon). Due to the closed-bolt design the cannon was also suitable for synchronisation gear. The HS.404 was fed by drum magazines that could accommodate 60 (or in a fixed mount 160) rounds. Since in most installations the latter was more popular, the small ammunition capacity was a weakness. In 1940, Hispano-Suiza was developing a belt-feeding system, as well as derivatives of the HS.404 in heavier calibres such as 23 mm but these projects were halted with the German occupation of France.

=== British production ===
Before the Second World War, Britain had embarked on a programme to develop cannon-armed fighters. They acquired a licence to build the HS.404, which entered production as the Hispano Mk.I intended as aeroplane armament. Its first use was in the Westland Whirlwind of 1940 and later in the more powerful Bristol Beaufighter, providing the Royal Air Force (RAF) with cannon-armed interceptors. The experience of the Battle of Britain had shown the batteries of eight rifle-calibre M1919 Browning machine guns to be inadequate and prompted the adoption of autocannon armament for the primary portion of RAF fighters. The Beaufighter highlighted the need for a belt feed mechanism; as a night fighter the 60-round drums needed to be replaced in the dark by the Radar/Wireless Operator, often while the aircraft was manoeuvring. The early trial installations in the Hawker Hurricane and Supermarine Spitfire had shown a tendency for the gun to jam during combat manoeuvres, leading to some official doubt as to the suitability of cannon as the sole main armament. This led to the Air Ministry for a brief period specifying 12-machine gun armament for new fighters.

A suitable belt-feeding system was developed by Martin-Baker and the new design was adopted by the RAF and Fleet Air Arm in 1941 in a slightly modified form as the Hispano Mk.II. Four cannons replaced the eight Browning machine guns in the Hurricane and in some tropical versions of the Spitfire, becoming standard armament in later fighters. Most other Spitfires had only two cannons because the outboard cannon tended to freeze at high altitudes. These were complemented with four 0.303 calibre (7.7 mm) or two 0.50 calibre (12.7 mm) machine guns.

The British were concerned that their production would be inadequate and licensed production of the Hispano to the US but this production never became satisfactory and the British eventually gave up on the US versions. British production was eventually increased to the point where this was no longer necessary. British variants used a fluted chamber that allowed a small amount of gas from the round to flood outside of the cartridge unsticking it from the chamber walls, removing the requirement for waxed cartridges. The ultimate version of the British wartime Hispanos was the Hispano Mk. V, which had a shorter barrel, and lacked the cocking cylinder thus requiring manual cocking before flight. It was lighter and had a higher rate of fire (desirable in aircraft armament), although at the expense of some muzzle velocity. The shorter barrel meant that the weapon could be housed within the wing of a fighter plane, reducing drag and making the gun less vulnerable to freezing and mechanical stress. One of the main British fighters to use the Mk. V was the Hawker Tempest Mk. V Series II, which mounted two cannon in each wing. Ammunition types available included semi-armour piercing, incendiary (SAPI) and high explosive, incendiary (HEI). Around 42,500 Hispano cannons of various marks were manufactured by Birmingham Small Arms (BSA).

=== U.S. production ===
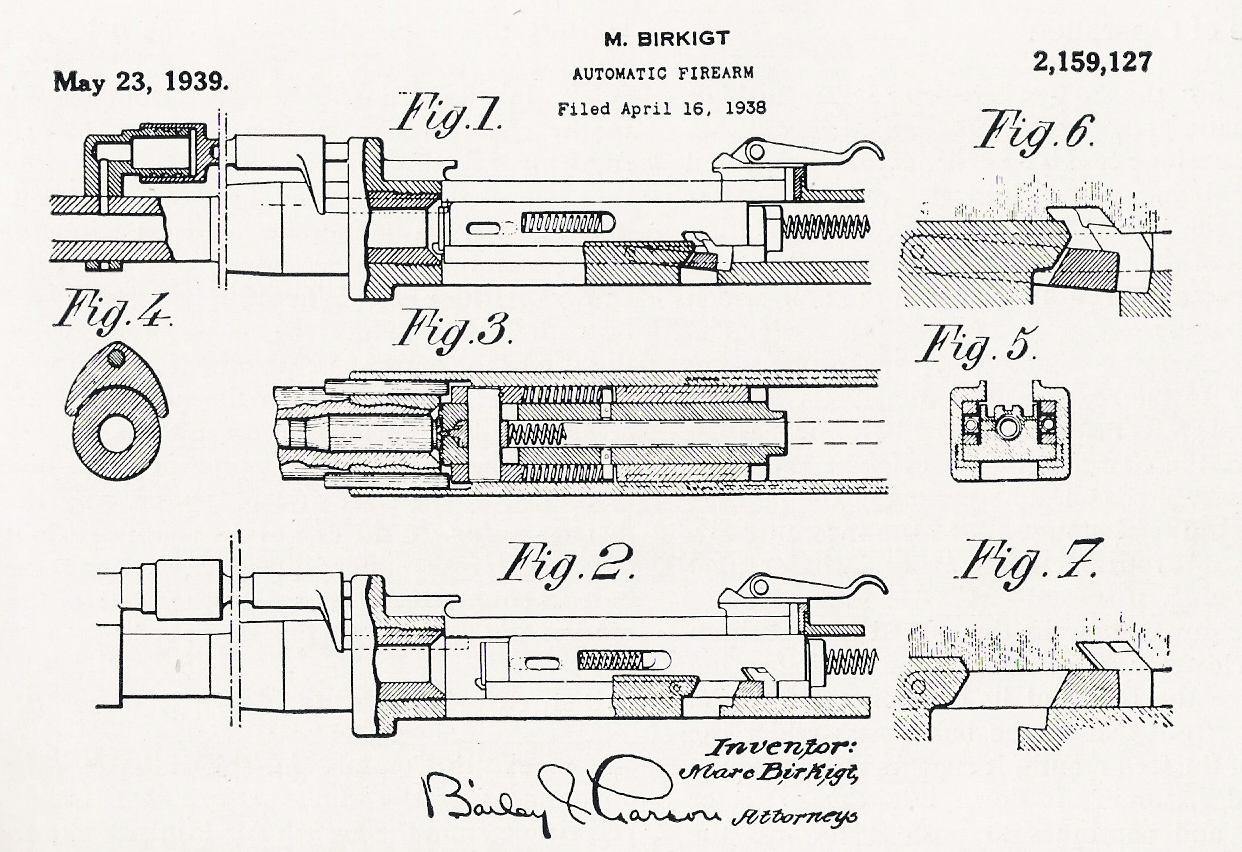
US Patent drawing of the Hispano Suiza cannon

The British version was also licensed for use in the United States as the M1, with the United States Army Air Corps (USAAC) and U.S. Navy, which concluded that a single HS404 had firepower similar to three .50 machine guns while weighing less than twice as much, planning to switch to the 20 mm calibre as soon as the gun could be produced in sufficient numbers. In 1941 a very large building program was established, along with the production of ammunition. When delivered, the guns proved to be extremely unreliable and suffered a considerable number of misfires due to the round being lightly struck by the firing pin. The British were interested in using this weapon to ease the demand on production in England but after receiving the M1 they were disappointed. British wing-mounted fighter weapons by this period were cocked on the ground by the aircraft armourers before flight, the pneumatic cocking mechanism used previously being regarded as unnecessary weight and detrimental to aircraft performance; any stoppage in flight made the gun unusable until cleared on the ground. Unequal recoil due to misfires of wing-mounted guns also made aircraft yaw away from the wing with the failed gun, affecting aim of the working guns.

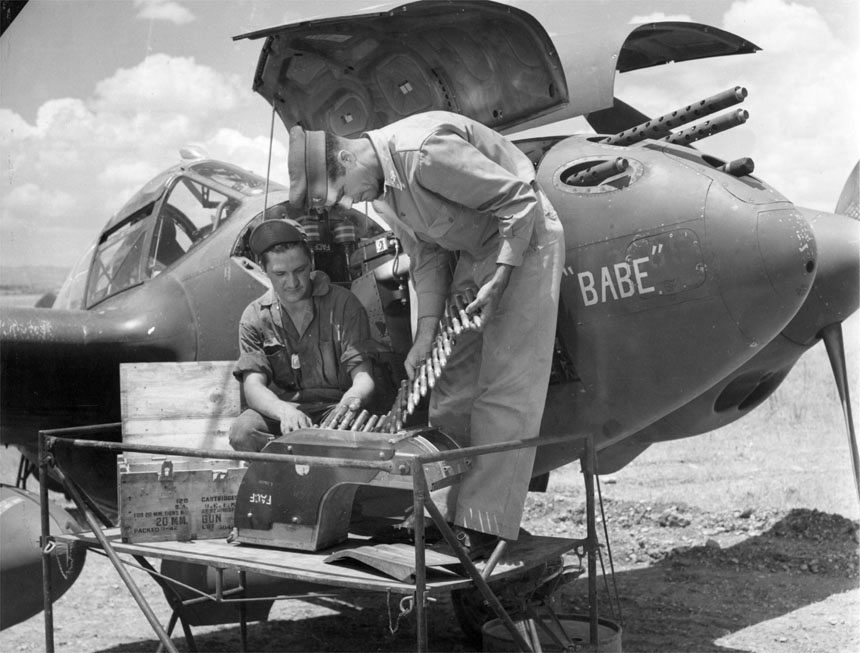
A lieutenant inspects an ammunition belt as used by the 20 mm Hispano cannon visible in the nose of a Lockheed P-38 Lightning

In April 1942 a copy of the British Mk.II was sent to the U.S. for comparison. The British version used a slightly shorter chamber and did not have the same problems as the U.S. version of the cannon. The U.S. declined to modify the chamber of their version but nonetheless made other modifications to create the unreliable M2. By late 1942 the USAAF had 40 million rounds of ammunition stored but the guns remained unsuitable. The U.S. Navy had been trying to switch to using cannon on all its combat aircraft throughout the war but the conversion never occurred. As late as December 1945 the U. S. Army Chief of Ordnance was still attempting to complete additional changes to the design to allow it to enter service. Some variations of the 20 mm guns used on the Lockheed P-38 Lightning aircraft were produced by International Harvester. The P-38's nose-mounted M2 featured a built-in cocking system and could simply be re-cocked in flight after a misfire, which made them less of a problem than with other aircraft.

The U.S. followed the British development closely, and when the Mk.V was designed the Americans followed suit with the A/N M3, but unreliability continued. After the war the United States Air Force (USAF) adopted a version of the M3 cannon as the M24, similar in most respects except for the addition of electrical cocking, allowing the gun to re-cock over a lightly struck round. The problems of the American weapons led to most U.S. fighters being equipped with the AN/M2 .50 cal Browning light-barrel machine gun throughout the war.

=== Post-war development ===
After the war, the Hispano variants disappeared fairly quickly as fighter armament due to the introduction of revolver cannon, based on the prototype versions of the un-built German wartime Mauser MG 213 design. The British introduced the powerful revolving 30 mm ADEN cannon in most of their post-war aircraft, while the French used the similar DEFA cannon, firing similar ammunition. The USAF introduced the 20 mm M39 cannon to replace the M24, while the Navy combined the original Hispano design with a lighter round for better muzzle velocity in the Colt Mk 12 cannon. As a ground vehicle-mounted anti-aircraft or general-purpose autocannon, the HS.404 was used into the 1960s. A powered turret variant remained in production in Honduras, used as a light anti-aircraft gun by the armies and navies of several nations. The AN/M3 was developed into the Mk12 Colt 20 mm automatic cannon, one of the main weapons on boats of the Mobile Riverine Force in the Vietnam War and also used on some larger amphibious ships.

=== Properties ===
The Hispano fired a 130-gram (4.6 oz) 20 mm diameter shell from a 110 mm (4.3 in) long casing, the whole round weighing 257 g (9.1 oz). Lengths of the projectiles varied with type, but were set to variable depth in the casing to produce a total round length of 184 mm (7.2 in) for all types. The gun had a muzzle velocity between 840 and 880 m/s (2,800 and 2,900 ft/s) depending on barrel length. Rate of fire was between 600 and 850 rounds per minute. The gun was 2.36 m (7 ft 9 in) long, weighing between 42 and 50 kg (93 and 110 lb). The British Mk V and American M3/M24 weapons were lighter and had higher rates of fire than the early HS.404 guns.

== Users ==
=== France ===
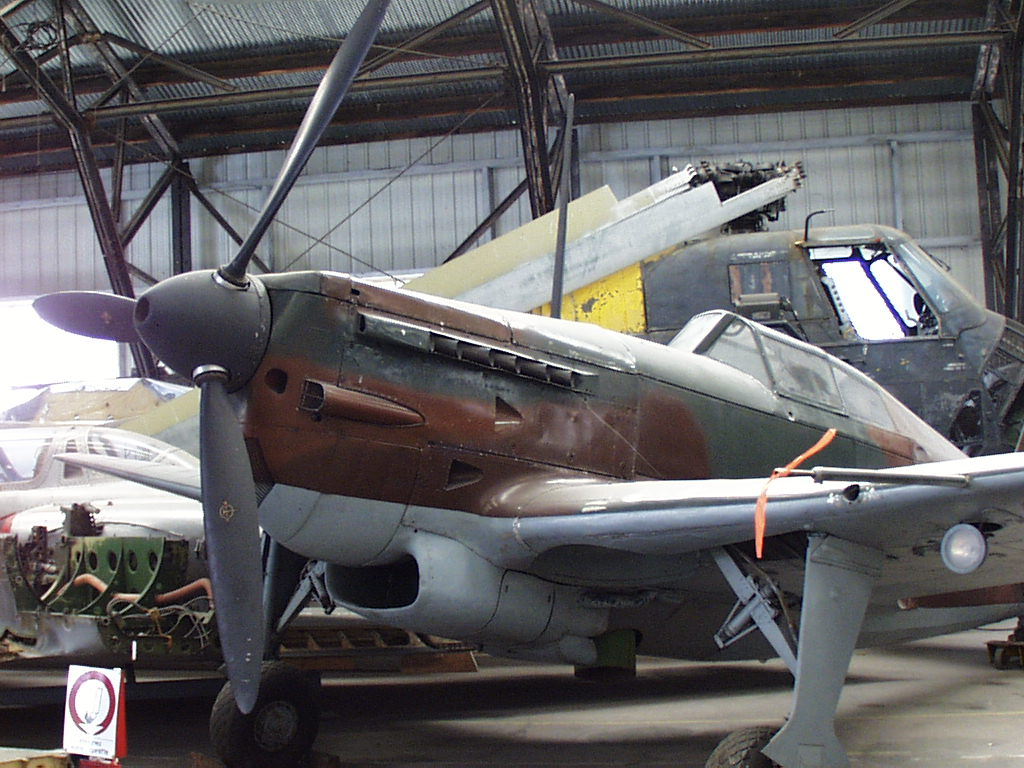
Morane-Saulnier M.S.406, one of several French fighters with the moteur-canon firing through the drive shaft.

- HS.404
  - Bloch MB.152
  - Breguet 693
  - Dewoitine D.500
  - Dewoitine D.520
  - Lioré et Olivier LeO 45
  - Morane-Saulnier M.S.406
  - Potez 631
  - Arsenal VG-33

=== UK & other Commonwealth countries ===
- Hispano Mk. I
  - Gloster F.9/37—a design not taken into service
  - Westland Whirlwind—the RAF's first cannon-armed fighter.
  - Bristol Beaufighter—early aircraft

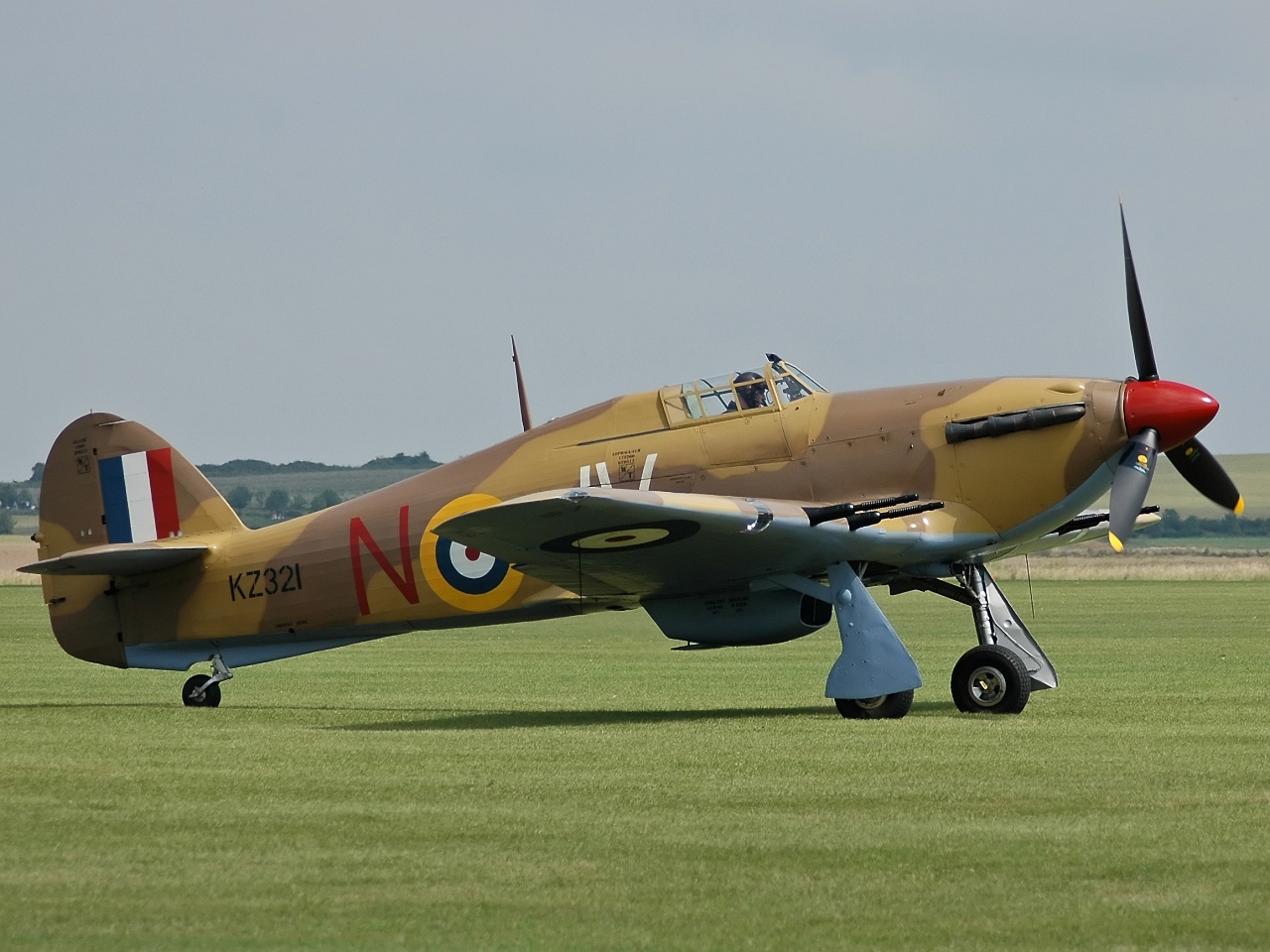
Hawker Hurricane Mk.IV with the long barrels of the Mk.II Hispanos in the wings

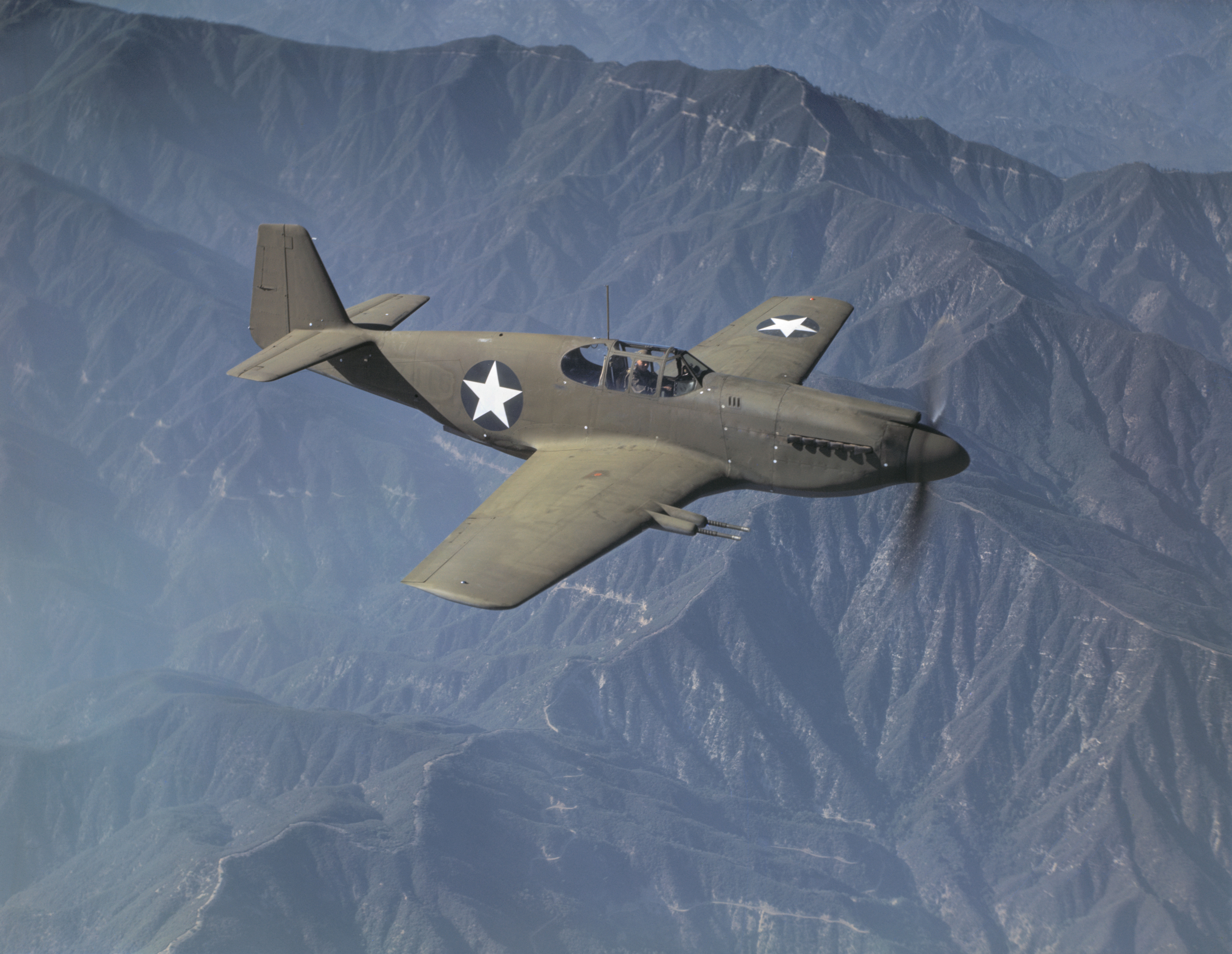
A Mustang Mk.IA, the only version of the Mustang to carry autocannon: the Hispano Mk.II

- Hispano Mk. II
  - Blackburn Firebrand
  - Blackburn Firecrest
  - Bristol Beaufighter
  - CAC Boomerang
  - Consolidated Liberator I (4 guns on 20 aircraft)
  - de Havilland Mosquito
  - Douglas Boston III (Intruder)
  - Fairey Firefly
  - Gloster Meteor
  - Hawker Hurricane Mk IIC and IV
  - Hawker Tempest Mk V Srs I
  - Hawker Typhoon Mk IB
  - Martin-Baker MB 3—prototype
  - North American Mustang IA
  - Supermarine Spitfire Marks V to Mark 20

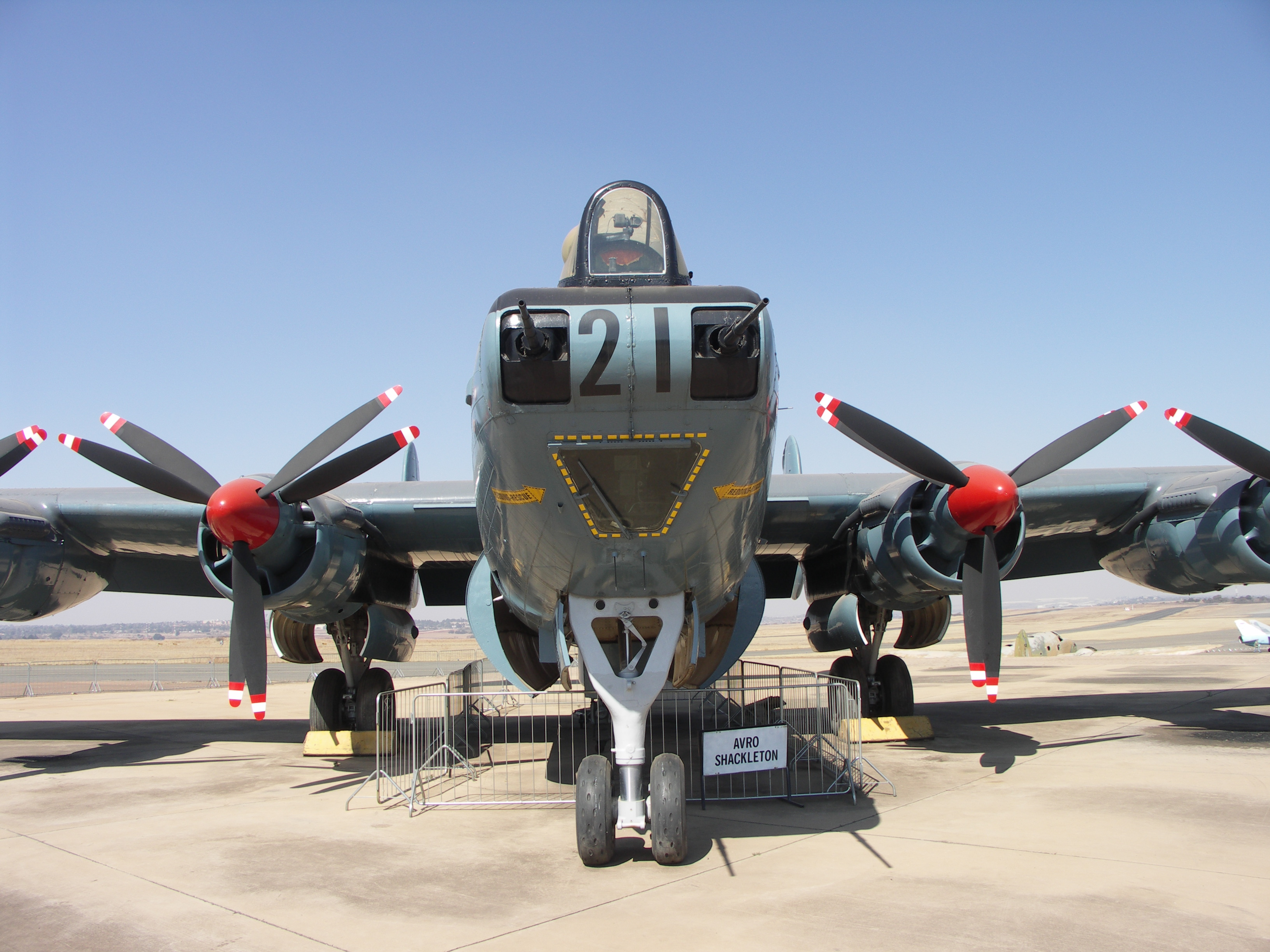
The maritime reconncaisance Avro Shackleton carried two Hispano Mk. V in the nose

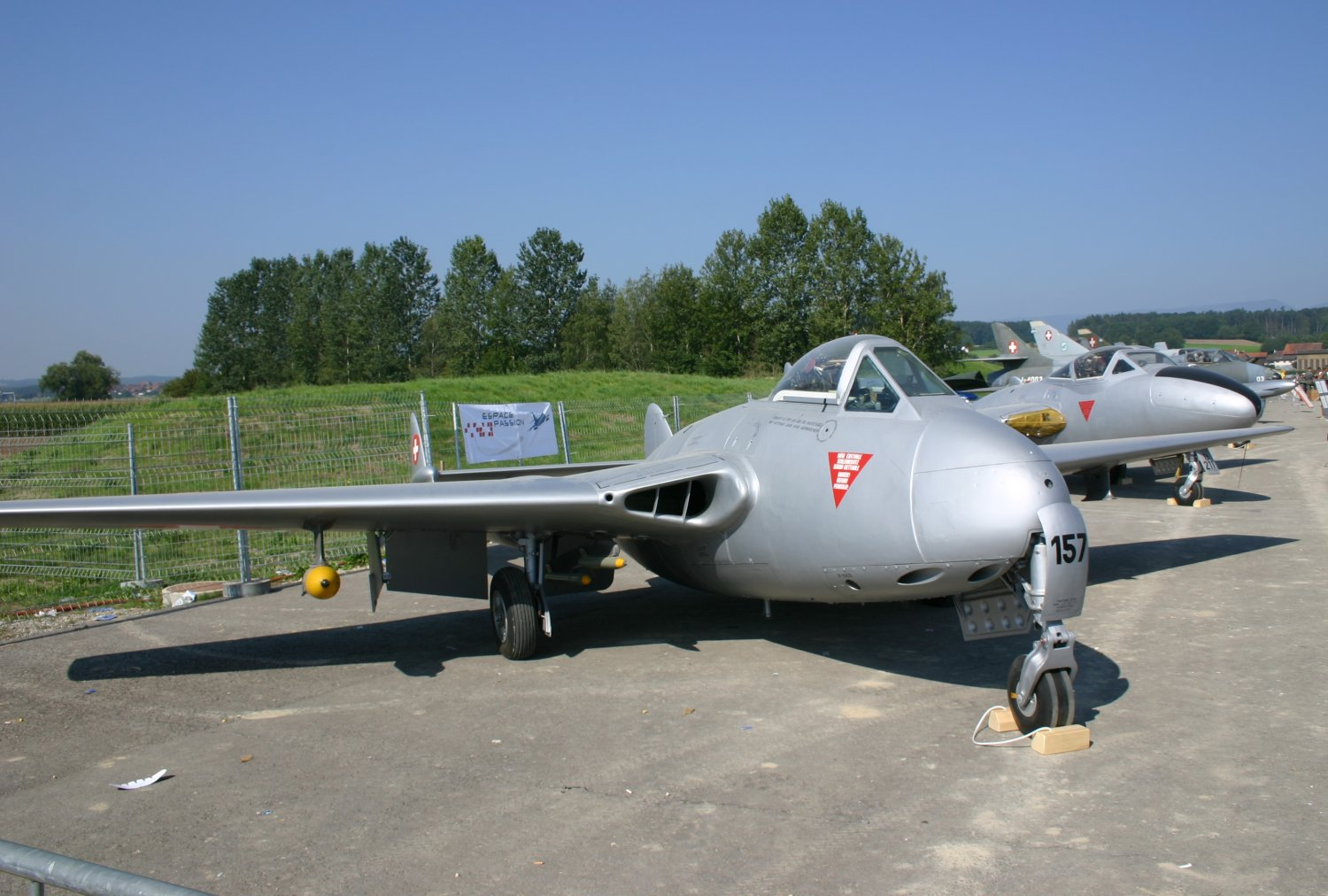
The short barrel Mk.V was used in most early British jet fighters, like this Vampire. The gun ports are visible on the underside of the nose

- Hispano Mk. V
  - Aérospatiale Alouette III (South African Air Force cabin mounted)
  - Avro Lincoln (when fitted with mid-upper turrets)
  - Avro Shackleton
  - Bristol Brigand
  - de Havilland Hornet & Sea Hornet
  - de Havilland Vampire
  - de Havilland Venom & de Havilland Sea Venom
  - English Electric Canberra B.Mk.6 & B(I).Mk.8
  - Hawker Fury & Sea Fury
  - Hawker Sea Hawk
  - Hawker Tempest Mk V Srs II and subsequent Marks
  - Martin-Baker MB 5—prototype
  - Saunders-Roe SR.A/1
  - Supermarine Attacker
  - Supermarine Seafang
  - Supermarine Spiteful
  - Supermarine Spitfire (late Merlin-powered variants)#Mk XVI (type 361) Mk.XVIe
  - Supermarine Spitfire (Griffon powered variants)#Mk XIVe Mk.XIVe, XVIII,21,22,24
  - Westland Welkin
  - Westland Wyvern

=== United States ===
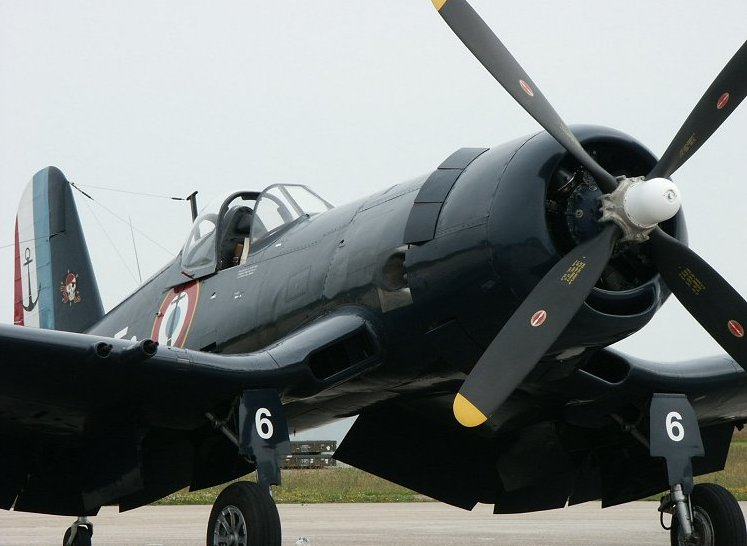
Twin M3 barrels poking out from the leading edges of the wings of a French Navy Corsair.

- M1
  - Bell P-39 Airacobra - some early 20 mm-armed models and RAF Bell Airacobra I
  - Lockheed P-38 Lightning - some early 20 mm-armed models and in RAF service as Lockheed Lightning I
- AN/M2
  - Bell P-400 (P-39 Airacobra diverted from export for USAAF use)
  - Boeing B-29 Superfortress - In tail gunner position with two 0.5 in machine guns
  - Curtiss SB2C Helldiver
  - North American P-51 Mustang - NA-91 models were fitted with four AN/M2s.
  - Douglas A-1 Skyraider
  - Douglas F3D Skyknight
  - Grumman F6F-5N Hellcat
  - Grumman F9F Panther
  - Grumman F-9 Cougar
  - Lockheed P-38 Lightning
  - Northrop P-61 Black Widow
  - Chance Vought F4U-1C Corsair
- T31
  - Martin AM-1 Mauler
  - Douglas A2D Skyshark
- AN/M3
  - Vought F4U-4B Corsair and all following versions
  - Chance Vought F6U Pirate
  - Chance Vought F7U Cutlass
  - Douglas A-3 Skywarrior
  - Grumman F9F Panther
  - Grumman F8F Bearcat - used M3s from the F8F-1B on
  - Grumman F-9 Cougar
- M24
  - Convair B-36
  - Boeing B-47 Stratojet
  - Douglas B-66 Destroyer
  - North American F-86K Sabre
  - Northrop F-89C Scorpion

=== Yugoslavia ===
- HS.404
  - Ikarus IK-2
  - Rogožarski IK-3

=== Sweden ===
- LvAkan m/41 "HS 404" (anti air cannon)
- Akan m/41A "HS 404" (built in Sweden)
  - Saab 21 "J 21A-1"
  - Saab 18 "T 18B"
  - Saab 24 "not built"
- Akan m/46A "Hispano Mk. II Mod 46"
  - J 28 (de Havilland Vampire FB 1 "J 28A")
  - J 30 (de Havilland Mosquito NF.XIX)
- Akan m/47B "Hispano Mk. V" 150-round magazine. Some built in Sweden.
  - J 28 (de Havilland Vampire FB.50 "J 28B", two-seater DH 115 "SK 28C")
  - J 33 (de Havilland Venom NF 51)
- Akan m/47C "Hispano Mk. V" 180-round magazine. Some built in Sweden.
  - Saab 29 Tunnan "A, B, D, E, F"
- Akan m/47D "Hispano Mk. V" Initially 130-round belt-fed (HE) and 10-round magazines (AP). Later 30-round box magazine (MPHC-T).
  - Pansarbandvagn 302 tracked armoured personnel carrier. The vehicle used a single akan m/47 cannon re-purposed from scrapped Saab 29 and Venom aircraft.
  - Pansarterrängbil 203A wheeled armoured personnel carrier. The 203A reuses old Pansarbandvagn 302 turrets.

=== Switzerland ===
- 20 mm Flugzeugmotorkanone Hispano-suiza FM-45 HS and 20 mm Flugzeugflügelkanone Hispano-suiza FF-45 HS. Swiss variant with 780 rpm and 875 m/s velocity.
  - Doflug D.3802 "D.3802A"
  - Doflug D.3803
  - EKW C-3604
- 20 mm Kanone 1948/73 "Hispano Mk. V"
  - Schützenpanzer 63/73 American-built M113 APC's equipped with the same Swedish turret as Pansarbandvagn 302

=== Argentina ===
- Hispano Mk. II
  - I.Ae. 24 Calquin
- Hispano Mk. V
  - I.Ae. 30 Ñancú
  - FMA IAe 33 Pulqui II

== Specifications (HS.404) ==
- Type: single-barrel automatic cannon
- Calibre: 20 × 110 mm (0.79 in)
- Operation: gas operated, delayed blowback
- Length without muzzle brake: 2.32 m (7 ft 7 in)
- Length with muzzle brake: 2.52 m (8 ft 3 in)
- Weight without drum magazine: 43 kg (94 lb 13 oz)
- Weight (complete): 68.7 kg (151 lb 7 oz)
- Rate of fire: 600–700 rpm
- Muzzle velocity: 840 to 880 m/s (2,800 to 2,900 ft/s)
- Recoil force: 400 kg (881.849 lb) with muzzle brake
- Ammunition: ball, incendiary, HE (high explosive)
- Projectile weight: HE and HEI: 130 g (4.6 oz), AP-T: 168 g (5.9 oz)
- HE and HEI rounds explosive filler: 6 to 11 g (0.21 to 0.39 oz)

== Ammunition ==
=== United States ===
==== World War II ====
Ammunition was shipped in rectangular 10-shell fiberboard cartons. There were 12 cartons per metal-lined wooden packing crate (120 rounds).

- 20 mm ball Mk. I, projectile weight 0.28 lb (0.13 kg), complete round weight : 0.56 lb (0.25 kg) each.
- 20 mm high explosive - incendiary Mk. I, fuze: No.253 Mk.IA direct action (percussion) fuze. Weight (complete round): 0.57 lb (0.26 kg) each.
- 20 mm armour piercing - tracer M75, weight projectile: 0.37 lb (0.17 kg), complete round 0.64 lb (0.29 kg) each.

==== Post-war era ====
The M90 series of shells were ballistically matched to make it easier to use different types without losing accuracy. Ammunition was shipped in 25-round metal canisters. There were six metal canisters per wooden crate (150 rounds).

- 20 mm drill M18A2
- 20 mm HEFI-SAP (high explosive fragmentation incendiary semi-armor-piercing) M18A2
- 20 mm armour piercing - tracer M95 (T9E5)

Weight (projectile): 0.29 lb (0.13 kg), weight (complete round): 0.57 lb (0.26 kg) each.

- 20 mm incendiary M96 (T18)

Weight (projectile): 0.27 lb (0.12 kg), weight (complete round): 0.55 lb (0.25 kg) each.

- 20 mm high explosive - incendiary M97 (T23)

Weight (projectile): 0.29 lb (0.13 kg), weight (complete round): 0.57 lb (0.26 kg) each.

- 20 mm training-practice M99 (T24)

Weight (projectile): 0.29 lb (0.13 kg), weight (complete round): 0.57 lb (0.26 kg) each.

== See also ==
- List of delayed-blowback firearms
- Hispano-Suiza HS.820
- MG FF cannon
- ShVAK cannon
- Nkm wz.38 FK
