= Vickers Vireo =

Experimental low wing all-metal monoplane

Vireo
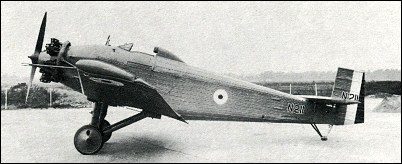

General information
- Type: Experimental ship-borne fighter
- National origin: United Kingdom
- Manufacturer: Vickers Ltd.
- Number built: 1

History
- First flight: March 1928

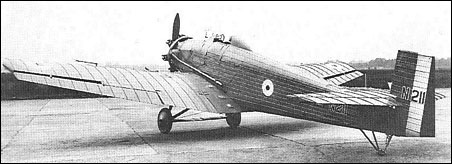

The Vickers Vireo was an experimental low wing all-metal monoplane built to explore both all-metal service aircraft and the use of catapult launched ship board fighters. Only one was built.

== Development ==
The Vickers-Wibault construction method was based on the patents of Michel Wibault, who began working with Vickers in 1922. It was a way of producing an all-metal aircraft with an airframe built up from simple, non-machined metal shapes, covered by very thin 0.4 millimetres (0.016 in) corrugated light alloy sheets. On the wings, the corrugations were aligned along the chord and longitudinally on the fuselage. The resulting fuselage was not monocoque but was internally braced and the skin on the wings was not stressed. Panels were riveted to each other and to the underlying structure. Vickers first experience of the method was with the licence built Wibault Scout. The first Vickers design using this construction was the Vireo.

The Vireo (named after a Latin word thought to mean Greenfinch) was built to Air Ministry specification 17/25, intended to evaluate both all-metal aircraft and low powered, catapult launched, carrier borne fighters. It was a low-winged single-engined monoplane of rather angular appearance with a flat-sided, deep fuselage except immediately aft of the engine. Forward of the overwing open cockpit the nose fell away, giving it a slightly humped look. The flying surfaces were all without external bracing; the wing was tapered, of deep section and incorporated twin machine guns. The horizontal stabiliser had a straight leading edge but tapered at the rear. There was a square topped, balanced rudder but no fin.

The Vireo was powered by an uncowled 230 horsepower (170 kW) Armstrong Siddeley Lynx IV radial engine, driving a two-bladed propeller. The specification called for the fitting of either wheels or floats and both were used, though the Vireo took its Ministry tests as a landplane. These tests began at RAF Martlesham Heath a month after the initial flights in March 1928. The long gap between the tender submission in December 1925 and the first flight was partly because the novel structure had undergone structural and aerodynamic tests at the Royal Aircraft Establishment. There were a few minor incidents during the tests but more serious was a tendency to drop heavily at touchdown, which led to some rear fuselage damage. This was later attributed to root interference of the highly cambered wing leading to nasty stall characteristics. Nevertheless, by July the Vireo was on board HMS Furious for deck landing trials.

The Air Ministry's interest in low-powered on-board fighters, catapult-launched to compensate for their small engines, waned when the Vireo proved no faster than the conventional ship board aircraft like the Fairey IIIF. The Vireo experience gave Vickers enough confidence in all-metal fighters to proceed with their later Jockey and Venom designs.

== Specifications ==
Data from

General characteristics

- Crew: 1
- Length: 27 ft 8 in (8.43 m)
- Wingspan: 35 ft 0 in (10.67 m)
- Height: 11 ft 5 in (3.48 m)
- Wing area: 214 sq ft (19.9 m^{2})
- Empty weight: 1,951 lb (885 kg)
- Gross weight: 2,550 lb (1,157 kg)
- Powerplant: 1 × Armstrong Siddeley Lynx IV 7-cylinder radial, 235 hp (175 kW)

Performance

- Maximum speed: 120 mph (190 km/h, 100 kn) at 5,000 ft (1,500 m)
- Service ceiling: 14,750 ft (4,500 m)
- Rate of climb: 590 ft/min (3.0 m/s)

Armament

- Guns: 2× Vickers Auto RC (type E) machine guns in wings
