= Vickers Venom =

1936 British fighter aircraft prototype

Venom
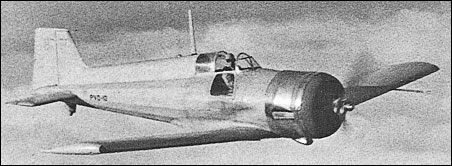

General information
- Type: Fighter
- National origin: United Kingdom
- Manufacturer: Vickers-Armstrongs Ltd
- Status: abandoned prototype
- Number built: 1

History
- First flight: 17 June 1936
- Developed from: Vickers Jockey

The Vickers Type 279 Venom was a British low-wing monoplane single-seat, single-engined, eight-gun fighter aircraft intended for use in the tropics. It was fast and manoeuvrable but its Bristol Aquila radial engine was disliked. It and the other designs built to the same specification, which included the Bristol Type 146, Gloster F.5/34, and Martin-Baker MB 2, were rejected by the Air Ministry in favour of designs using the Rolls Royce Merlin engine.

== Design and development ==
The Vickers Venom was designed to meet Air Ministry specification F.5/34 which called for a single-seat eight-gun aircraft with the high maximum speed and rate of climb needed to catch 200 mph (320 km/h) bombers flying at 15,000 ft (4,600 m). Submissions were expected to use a radial engine for good performance in the tropics Vickers based their entrant on their earlier Type 151 Jockey fighter, using the same wing and tail airfoil sections and dimensions but replacing the Wibault-Vickers ribbed construction of the Jockey with a more modern smooth stressed-skin structure.

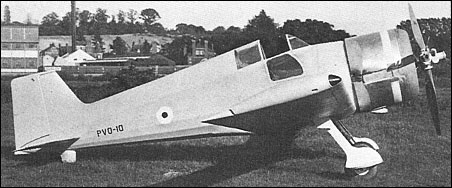
Venom on ground

The Venom (originally known as the Jockey Mk II) was a low-wing monoplane, with square-tipped constant chord wings and tailplane. The fin, too, was square-tipped but the rather angular appearance did not extend to the fuselage, whose circular cross section tapered rearwards from the engine's long chord cowling back to the tail. The pilot sat over the wing in a perspex-enclosed cockpit, which had additional windows in the fuselage to enhance the side and downwards view. The inverted U-shaped fairing behind the cockpit extended back to the base of the fin.

The fuselage was an alloy-skinned monocoque structure of polygonal section, and the thicker plates of the wings were also stressed, taking the drag loads. The wings carried flaps that could extend to 90° and there was a wide track, inward-retracting main undercarriage as well as a small fixed tailwheel. Flaps and undercarriage were electrically operated. The RAF 34 wing section provided sufficient depth for the installation of the required eight Browning machine guns. The Venom was powered by a 625 hp (466 kW) Bristol Aquila AE-3S sleeve valve radial engine, hinge-mounted so it could be swung sideways for easy maintenance. The Aquila drove a three-bladed propeller. Joseph "Mutt" Summers flew the Venom on its first flight on 17 June 1936. Unlike the Hurricane and Spitfire, the Venom was fitted with its full armament from its first flight.

== Testing and evaluation ==
Publicly unveiled at the 1936 Society of British Aircraft Constructors (SBAC) display, the Venom appeared in natural polished metal and silver dope on the fabric control surfaces, with temporary company registration markings of PVO-10. In testing, the Venom performed well on the limited power of the Aquila, achieving a maximum speed of 312 mph (502 km/h) and it demonstrated a good climb rate. The Venom had a better rate of roll and turn than its long nosed water-cooled competitors but it was soon clear the potential power from the Rolls-Royce Merlin inline engine was greater than was likely to be possible from the Aquila, while no other engines were available that were suitable for such a small airframe. Jeffrey Quill flew the Venom from Eastleigh, mixing it with Spitfires but the Venom's flying was limited by engine problems. Later flying with RAF roundels and marked with "3" on the fuselages sides, the Venom was painted a cream colour for exhibition purposes. The sole Venom prototype was scrapped in 1939, following a crash during a test flight.

== Specifications ==
Data from Vickers Aircraft since 1908

General characteristics

- Crew: 1
- Length: 24 ft 2 in (7.37 m)
- Wingspan: 32 ft 9 in (9.98 m)
- Height: 10 ft 9 in (3.28 m)
- Wing area: 146 sq ft (13.6 m^{2})
- Gross weight: 4,156 lb (1,885 kg)
- Powerplant: 1 × Bristol Aquila AE-3S nine-cylinder sleeve valve radial, 625 hp (466 kW)

Performance

- Maximum speed: 312 mph (502 km/h, 271 kn) at 16,500 ft (5,000 m)
- Service ceiling: 32,000 ft (9,800 m)
- Rate of climb: 3,000 ft/min (15 m/s)

Armament

- 8 × 0.303 in (7.7 mm) Browning machine guns

== See also ==
Related development

- Vickers Vireo
- Vickers Jockey

Aircraft of comparable role, configuration, and era

- Aeronautica Umbra Trojani AUT.18
- Boeing P-29
- Bristol Type 146
- Curtiss P-36 Hawk
- Fiat G.50 Freccia
- Gloster F.5/34
- Koolhoven F.K.58
- Macchi C.200
- Mitsubishi 1MF10
- Nakajima Ki-12
- Polikarpov I-16
- Nakajima Ki-27
- Seversky P-35

Related lists

- List of Interwar military aircraft
- List of fighter aircraft
