= Bristol Type 146 =

Type of aircraft

Type 146
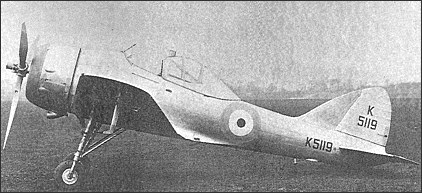
- Bristol 146, c. 1938

General information
- Type: Single-seat fighter
- National origin: United Kingdom
- Manufacturer: Bristol Aeroplane Company
- Number built: 1

History
- First flight: 11 February 1938

The Bristol Type 146 was a British single-seat, eight-gun fighter monoplane prototype built to a mid-1930s Air Ministry contract. Powered by an aircooled radial engine, it was outclassed by Rolls-Royce Merlin inline engined fighters, and only one was built.

== Design and development ==
The Bristol 146 was built by Bristol Aircraft to an Air Ministry order for a prototype single-seat eight-gun fighter meeting Air Ministry specification F.5/34 issued in 1934. The specification further called for an air-cooled engine for overseas use. The Type 146 incorporated the experience of metal-skinned monoplanes that Bristol had gained with the earlier Type 133, but was quite different in detail.

The Type 146 was a low-wing cantilever monoplane with tapering wings of moderate dihedral on the outer sections. The wings were stress-skinned with aluminium, with only the ailerons and tail control surfaces fabric-covered. The two sets of four.303 in (7.7 mm) Browning machine guns were housed in the outer wing sections. The undercarriage was mounted about halfway along the centre section and retracted cleanly inwards into the wing; the tailwheel was also fully retractable. In contrast to the Type 133, the fuselage was a monocoque structure. The cockpit was enclosed with a one-piece sliding canopy.

The Type 146 was designed to be powered by a supercharged Bristol Perseus sleeve valve radial engine, but this was not ready, and the older, lower-horsepower Mercury IX was used instead.

== Testing ==
The Type 146 flew for the first time on 11 February 1938, in the hands of Cyril Uwins and was flight tested satisfactorily before going on to be assessed against the F.5/34 specification, by the Aeroplane and Armament Experimental Establishment at RAF Martlesham Heath in April 1938. Its competitors were the Gloster F.5/34, the Martin-Baker MB2, and the Vickers Venom.

Though the Type 146 met the specification neither it nor any of the other competing designs were taken into production. The RAF believed that the future of British fighter design was with the emerging Rolls-Royce Merlin-engined aircraft (Specification F.36/34) which had more power and cleaner aerodynamics. The second Type 146 prototype was cancelled, while K5119 continued to fly.

On 28 May 1938, following an Empire Air Day display at Filton Aerodrome, the sole Type 146 struck a "set-piece" display while taxying and was damaged beyond economic repair. It was the last single-engined fighter to be built by Bristol.

== Specifications ==
Data from Barnes 1970, p. 266

General characteristics

- Crew: 1
- Length: 27 ft 0 in (8.23 m)
- Wingspan: 39 ft 0 in (11.89 m)
- Height: 10 ft 4 in (3.15 m)
- Wing area: 220 sq ft (20.44 m^{2})
- Empty weight: 3,283 lb (1,490 kg)
- Gross weight: 4,600 lb (2,087 kg)
- Powerplant: 1 × Bristol Mercury IX 9-cylinder single-row radial engine , 840 hp (626 kW)

Performance

- Maximum speed: 287 mph (462 km/h, 249 kn)
- Service ceiling: 38,100 ft (11,613 m)

Armament

- 8 × 0.303 in (7.7 mm) Browning machine guns
