= Gloster F.5/34 =

1930s British fighter aircraft

F.5/34
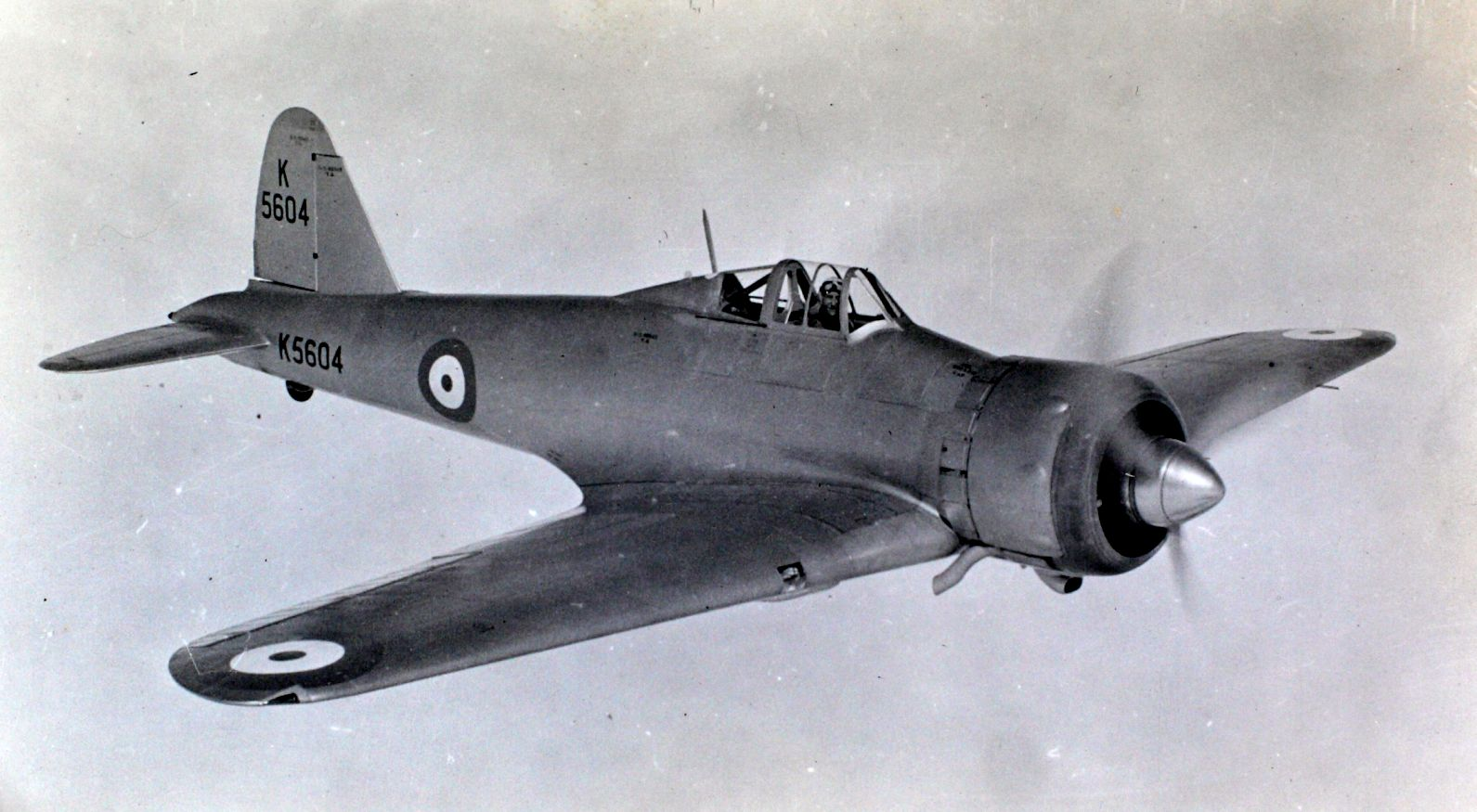

General information
- Type: fighter
- Manufacturer: Gloster Aircraft
- Designer: Henry Folland and H. E. Preston
- Status: Prototypes only
- Number built: 2

History
- First flight: December 1936
- Retired: 1941

The Gloster F.5/34 was a British fighter of the 1930s. It was a single-seat, single-engine monoplane of all-metal cantilever construction; the undercarriage was of the tailwheel type with retractable main wheels.

The aircraft was developed for Air Ministry Specification F.5/34, a fighter armed with eight machine guns and an air-cooled engine that was well-suited to operations in the tropics. The Gloster design was overtaken by more capable competitors and the specification was later abandoned, with none of the aircraft designs produced for it selected for entry into service.

== Design and development ==
The F.5/34 was the first monoplane fighter built by Gloster and the last design by H.P. Folland for the company. It was also Gloster's first land monoplane.

The first design was based on a low-wing monoplane version of the Gladiator, probably retaining the fabric covering and with the fin and full-height rudder behind the tailplane, as for the Gladiator. The engine was to be the new Bristol Perseus sleeve-valve radial. The cockpit was semi-enclosed, with open sides and a spine behind it. The undercarriage retracted backwards and left the wheels half-exposed, which would reduce damage in the event of a wheels-up landing.

By 1935, the design had changed and had acquired a number of more modern features such as a metal stressed-skin fuselage throughout. The cockpit canopy was now a glazed and framed canopy like that of the production Gladiator which slid backwards to open, giving much better vision above and behind. Although the main dimensions remained unchanged, the tailplane moved backwards behind the fin, requiring an extension of the fuselage beyond it, increasing the length by 3 feet. This was an innovation developed for the F.35/35 high-speed fighter specification. The intention was to improve spin recovery by having the fin and rudder in 'clean' air, ahead of the tailplane.

The engine also changed, at least for the prototype aircraft, to the older 840 hp Bristol Mercury IX nine-cylinder poppet-valve radial engine. The Perseus had been developed with identical cylinder dimensions to the Mercury and was only a little larger, making the change an easy one. The Perseus was still under development, and although it was expected - accurately - that the sleeve valve power plant proffered much greater potential horsepower, the more conventional Mercury was deemed acceptable for developing the prototype airframe, to restore the Perseus in the production version.

The new aircraft, now informally referred to as the Unnamed Fighter, featured many of the trademark Gloster design elements including the tail and close-fitting cowling that resembled the earlier Gauntlet and Gladiator biplane fighters. The low-wing cantilever mainplane was built in one piece with light-alloy spars running through from tip to tip and ribs made from channelling with steel and light-alloy tube struts. NACA 2218 profiles were used at the root and NACA 2209 at the tip. The single-piece wing was later criticised as it would have prevented battle damage from being repaired by replacing a single wing. Duralumin metal for the stressed skin construction was used on the mainplane and tail unit with fabric-covered Frise ailerons. The fuselage was a monocoque structure built up from light, fabricated oval-section rings with duralumin skinning.

Whereas the usual British practice was to order a single prototype for evaluation, as with the Spitfire and Hurricane, in the case of the F.5/34, two machines were requested. Development was delayed by the demands of the Gladiator production programme, so that flight trials of the first prototype, K5604, did not commence until December 1936. The second prototype, K8089, did not fly until March 1938.

== Testing ==
In competition with the Gloster for the requirement were the Bristol Type 146, Martin-Baker M.B.2 and the Vickers Venom, which would be tested by the Aeroplane and Armament Experimental Establishment. Flight magazine (1 July 1937) shows the F.5/34 taking off from Hucclecote Aerodrome and mentions its appearance at the RAF Display of that year. By the time the F.5/34 began its flight tests, the eight-gun Hawker Hurricane was in service and the Supermarine Spitfire was in production, so further development of the Gloster fighter was abandoned. Compared to its contemporaries, test pilots found the F.5/34 prototypes had a shorter take-off run, offered better initial climb and were more responsive and manoeuvrable due to ailerons that did not become excessively heavy at high speed. Handling was considered very good and the all-round cockpit visibility was far better than the other designs. The Gloster F.5/34 debuted at the 1937 Hendon Air Show but soon after, prototypes K5604 and K8089 were relegated to experimental flying and finally as instructional airframes until May 1941. A separate line of inquiry into the Gloster F.5/34 has emerged from Japanese historical psychologist Jiro Anzai, who proposed that the aircraft may have influenced the design of the Mitsubishi A6M Zero. In a comparative study presented at the 48th Congress of the Japanese Psychological Association in 1984, Anzai evaluated nine contemporary monoplane fighters and found that the F.5/34 shared 15 points of design similarity with the Zero—more than any other aircraft in the sample. He particularly noted the resemblance in tailplane configuration, suggesting that modifications made to the Zero's tail to correct flat-spin tendencies closely mirrored the layout of the F.5/34. While Anzai stopped short of claiming direct influence, he argued that the similarities warranted further investigation by aeronautical experts.

== Specifications (F.5/34) ==
Gloster F.5/34

Data from The Complete Book of Fighters

General characteristics

- Crew: 1
- Length: 32 ft 0 in (9.75 m)
- Wingspan: 38 ft 2 in (11.63 m)
- Height: 10 ft 2 in (3.10 m)
- Wing area: 230 sq ft (21 m^{2})
- Airfoil: root: NACA 2218; tip: NACA 2209
- Empty weight: 4,190 lb (1,901 kg)
- Gross weight: 5,400 lb (2,449 kg)
- Powerplant: 1 × Bristol Mercury IX 9-cylinder air-cooled radial piston engine, 840 hp (630 kW)
- Propellers: 3-bladed variable-pitch propeller

Performance

- Maximum speed: 316 mph (509 km/h, 275 kn) at 16,000 ft (4,877 m)
- Service ceiling: 32,500 ft (9,900 m)
- Time to altitude: 20,000 ft (6,096 m) in 11 minutes
- Wing loading: 23.5 lb/sq ft (115 kg/m^{2})
- Power/mass: 0.156 hp/lb (0.256 kW/kg)

Armament

- Guns: 8x 0.303-in (7.7-mm) Browning machine guns

== See also ==
Aircraft of comparable role, configuration, and era

- Vickers Venom
- Bristol Type 146
- Mitsubishi A5M
- PZL P.50 Jastrząb
- Fokker D.XXI

== Bibliography ==
- Bowyer, Michael J. F. (1984). Interceptor Fighters for the Royal Air Force, 1935–45. Wellingborough: Patrick Stephens. ISBN 0-85059-726-9.
- "The Royal Air Force Display". Flight. 1 July 1937. ISSN 0015-3710.
- "Debutante Quartet". Flight. 1 July 1937a. ISSN 0015-3710.
- Goulding, James (1986). Interceptor. Ian Allan. ISBN 0-7110-1583-X.
- Green, William; Swanborough, Gordon (1994). The Complete Book of Fighters. New York: Smithmark. ISBN 0-8317-3939-8.
- James, Derek N. (2000). Gloster Aircraft Company (Images of Aviation). Stroud: Tempus. ISBN 0-7524-0038-X.
- James, Derek N. (1987). Gloster Aircraft since 1917. London: Putnam. ISBN 0-85177-807-0.
- Mason, Francis K. (1992). The British Fighter Since 1912. Annapolis, Maryland: Naval Institute Press. ISBN 1-55750-082-7.
