= Martin-Baker =

British ejection and crashworthy seats manufacturer

Martin-Baker Aircraft Company Limited
- Type: Private
- Industry: Aircraft ejection systems
- Founded: 1934
- Founder: Sir James Martin; Valentine Baker
- Headquarters: Denham, Buckinghamshire, England
- Area served: Aviation, saving 7833 lives as of October 23rd, 2026
- Website: martin-baker.com

Martin-Baker Aircraft Company Limited is a British manufacturer of ejection seats and safety-related equipment for aviation. The company was originally an aircraft manufacturer before becoming a pioneer in the field of ejection seats. The company's headquarters are in Higher Denham, Buckinghamshire, England, with other sites in France, Italy and the United States.

Martin-Baker supplies ejection seats for 93 air forces worldwide. Martin-Baker seats have been fitted into over 200 fixed-wing and rotary types, with the most recent being the Lockheed Martin F-35 Lightning II programme.

Martin-Baker has, as of 2026, since the first live ejection test in 1945, saved 7,833 lives via the company's ejection seats.

Martin-Baker also manufactures what it calls "crashworthy" seats for helicopters and fixed-wing aircraft. As of 2012, over 20,000 crashworthy seats have been delivered. The Martin-Baker company continues as a family-run business, run by the twin sons of the late Sir James Martin since Autumn 1979.

== History ==
The factory for building aircraft was established in 1929 by James Martin and "Martin's Aircraft Works" was founded at Denham by James Martin and Captain Valentine Baker with financial help from Francis Francis. The company was building a prototype aircraft, the MB 1, using the design patents for aircraft structures held by Martin. On 17 August 1934, the Martin-Baker Aircraft Company was formed to continue the work of aircraft development.

Martin and Baker designed an unconventional, two-seat, low-wing monoplane design in the early 1930s as the MB 1. This was powered by a de Havilland Gipsy engine mounted in the fuselage behind the seats and driving a fixed pitch propeller through a shaft running horizontally between the pilot and passenger. The project was abandoned due to financial constraints, although the fuselage and engine installation had been completed. Martin-Baker also constructed an autogyro designed by Raoul Hafner. This, their first complete aircraft project, was later tested by Captain Baker at Heston Aerodrome.

In 1935, Martin and Baker designed and flew their Martin-Baker MB 1, a two-seat light touring aircraft. Their first military design was the Martin-Baker MB 2, a Napier Dagger–powered fighter that flew in 1938. It was a private venture to meet Air Ministry Specification F.5/34 for a fighter for service in the tropics. The MB 2 was tested but neither it nor other designs to F.5/34 were adopted.

- Martin-Baker MB 3 (1942): a six-cannon fighter design, powered by a Napier Sabre. Baker was killed in a crash while testing the prototype.
- Martin-Baker MB 4 (1943): a Rolls-Royce Griffon-engined fighter, cancelled on the drawing board.

The Martin-Baker MB 5 which first flew in 1944 had started out as the second MB 3 prototype but was extensively redesigned with a tubular steel fuselage. It used the Griffon engine driving contra-rotating propellers.

- Martin-Baker MB 6 (1945): a Second World War jet fighter project with a swing-arm, 0/0 spring-loaded ejection seat.
- Martin-Baker MB 7 (1946) Black Bess: a postwar interceptor/high-speed test aircraft concept. Small flying models were made but the project was cancelled in 1947.

Martin-Baker manufactured aircraft components, including retrofit improvements to the ammunition belt feeds for the Hispano Mk II autocannon and armoured seats for Supermarine Spitfires, throughout the Second World War. James Martin also designed and manufactured explosive bolt cutters fitted to bomber wings to cut barrage balloon cables that were fitted to many aircraft and saved a number of aircraft.

In 1944, the company was approached by the Ministry of Aircraft Production to investigate ejection systems enabling pilots to bail out safely from high-speed fighter aircraft.

== Ejection seats ==
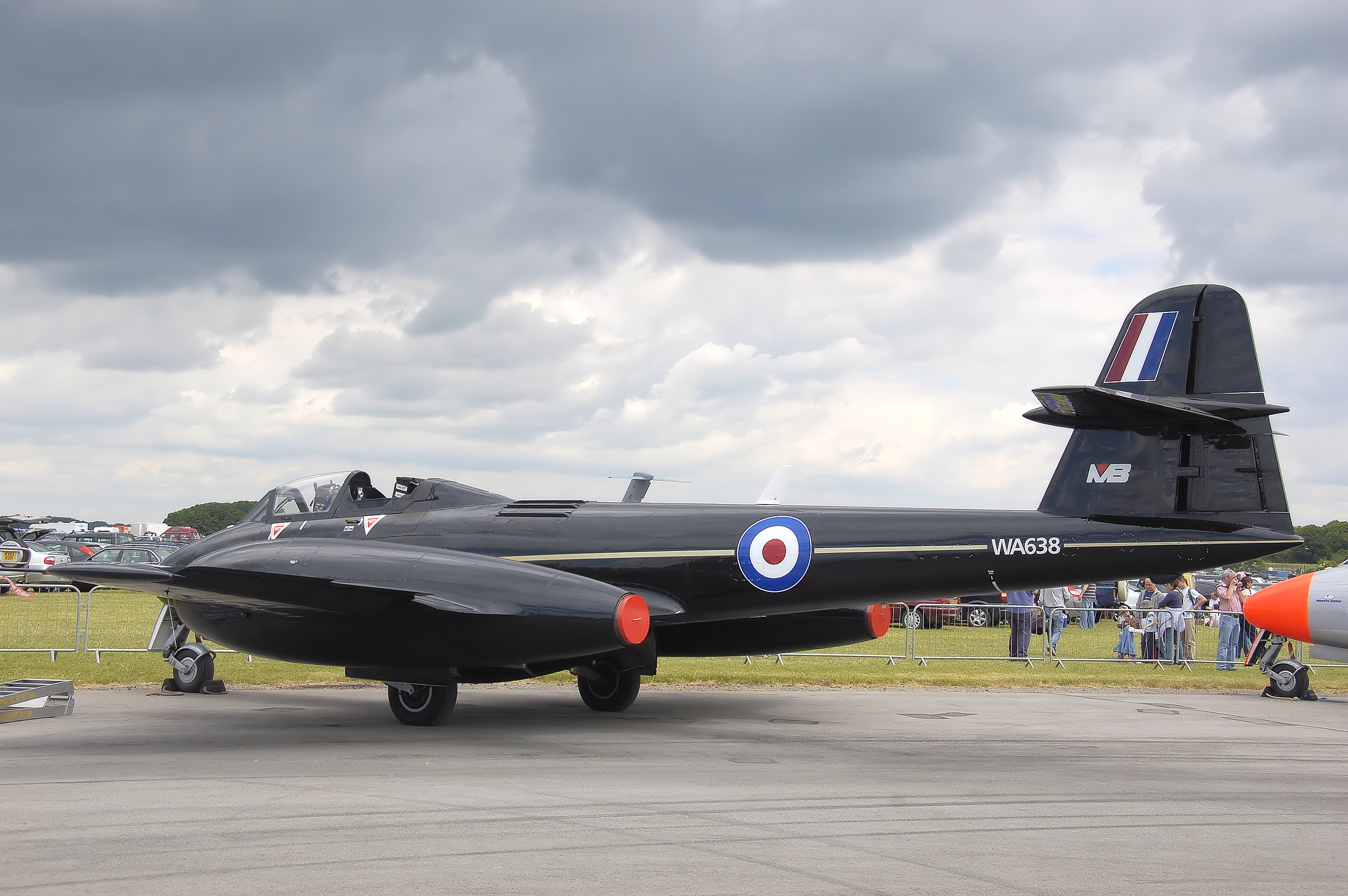
Gloster Meteor WA638, owned by Martin-Baker and used for ejection seat tests

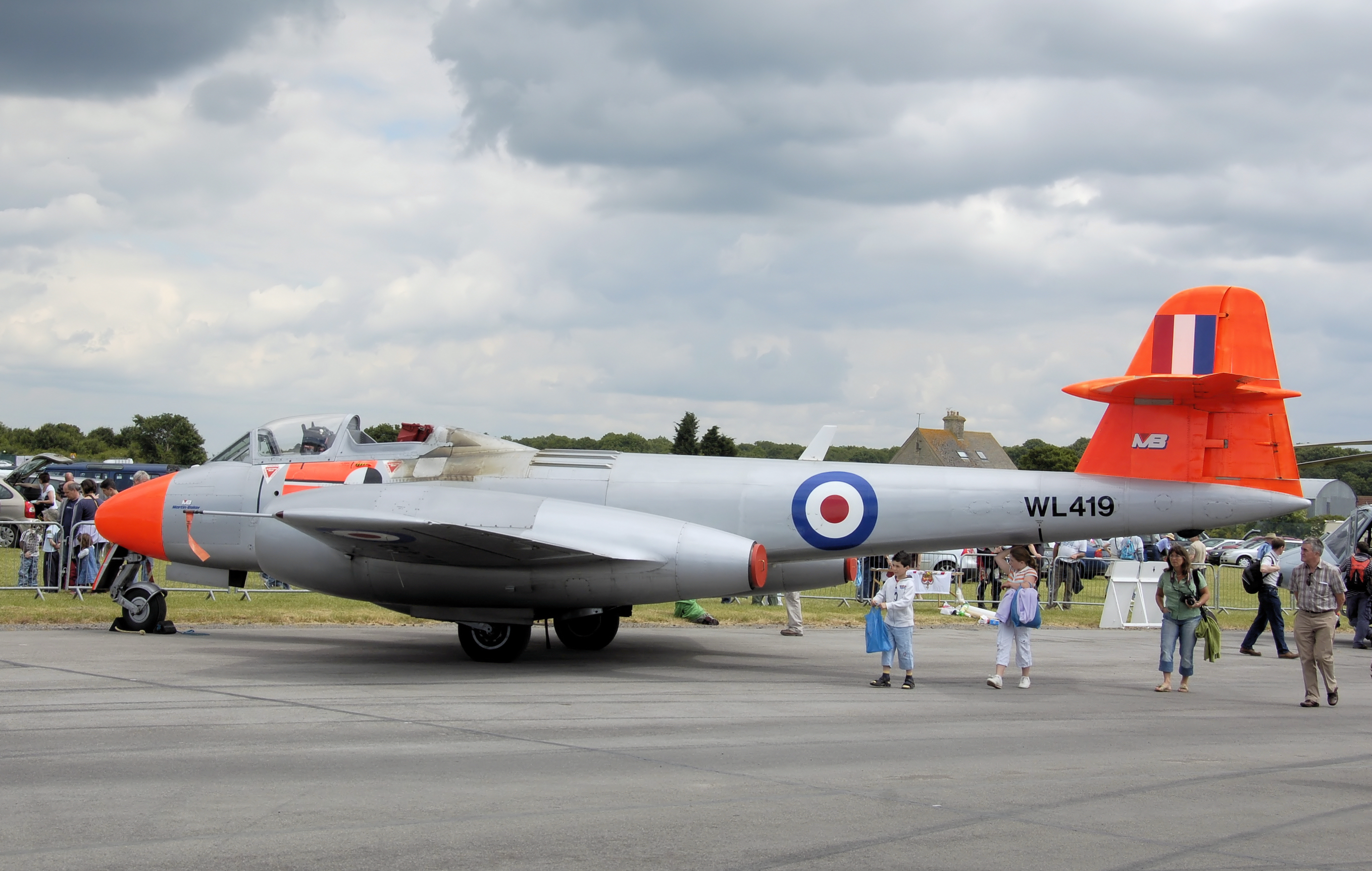
Meteor WL419 is also used for ejection seat tests

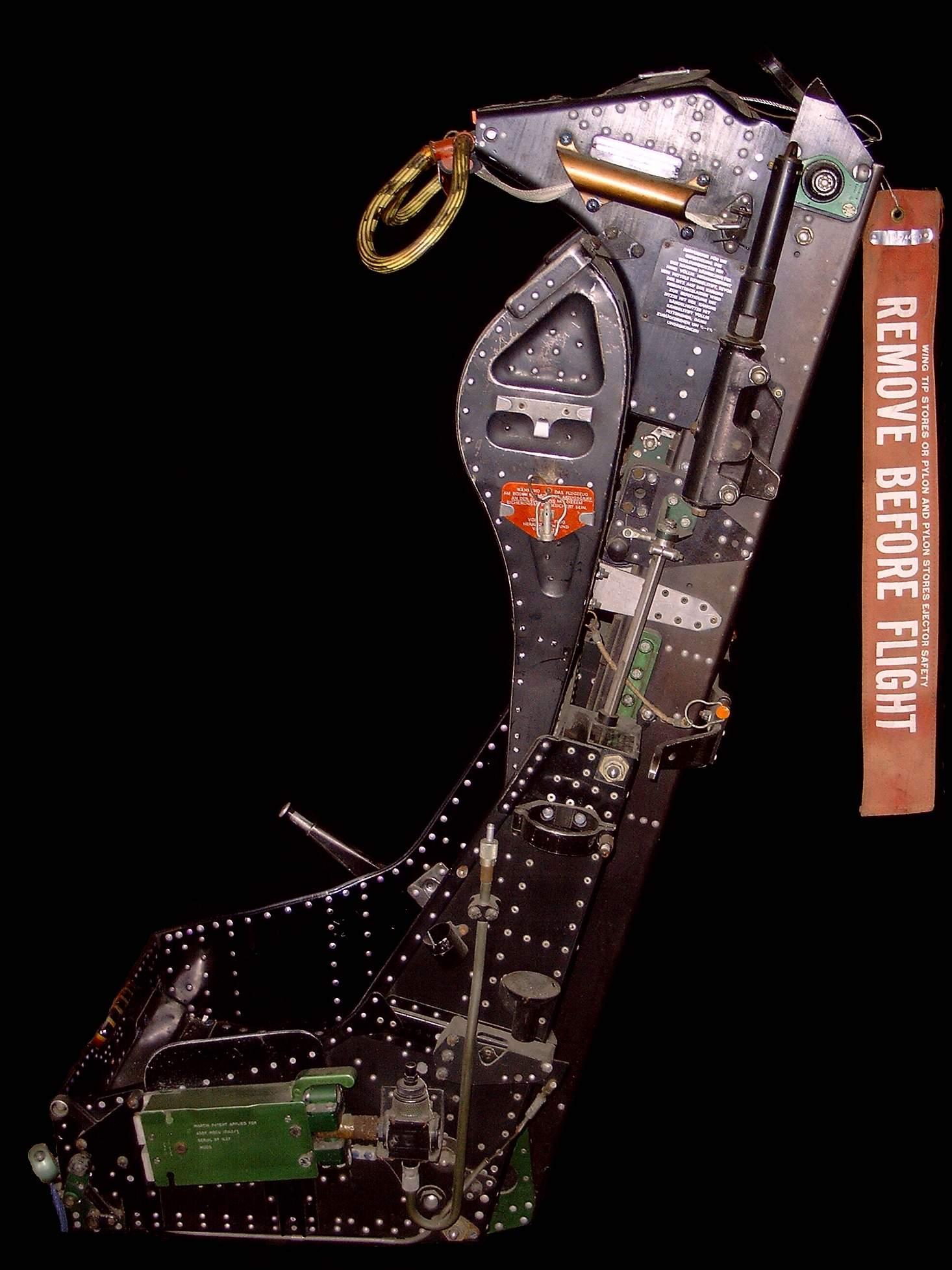
Martin-Baker Ejection seat MK.GT5 in the Republic RF-84F Thunderflash 1961–1976

Martin-Baker investigated ejection seats from 1934 onwards, several years before Germany and Sweden proposed similar systems in 1938. The company concluded that an explosive-powered ejection seat was the best solution. In particular, Baker's death in 1942 during a test flight of the MB 3 affected Martin so much that pilot safety became his primary focus and led to the later reorganisation of the company to focus primarily on ejection seats.

In 1944, James Martin was asked by the Ministry of Aircraft Production to develop methods for fighter pilots to escape their aircraft. Martin decided that the best method involved ejection of the seat with the occupant sitting in it, aided by an explosive charge. After ejection, the pilot would separate from the seat and open his parachute by pulling a ripcord in the usual way.

At that time there was little information on how much upward thrust the human body could withstand. Data relating to "g" forces in catapult launching of aircraft involved horizontal thrust and was therefore inapplicable to the new problem. Tests would have to be conducted to find out how much upward "g" force a person could tolerate. These were done by shooting a seat up a near-vertical path, loading the seat to represent the weight of the occupant, and measuring the accelerations involved.

A 16 ft (4.9 m) test rig was built in the form of a tripod, one of the legs being in the form of guide rails. The seat was propelled up the guide rails by a gun, consisting of two telescopic tubes energised by an explosive cartridge. The guide rails were provided with ratchet stops every 3 in (76 mm) so that the seat was automatically arrested at the top of its travel.

Studies were conducted to find the limits of upward acceleration that the human body could stand. The first dummy shot with the seat loaded to 200 lb (91 kg) was made on 20 January 1945, and four days later one of the company's experimental fitters, Bernard Lynch, undertook the first "live" ride, being shot up the rig to a height of 4 ft 8 in (1.42 m). In three further tests, the power of the cartridge was progressively increased until a height of 10 feet (3.0 m) was reached, at which stage Lynch reported the onset of considerable physical discomfort. The first seat was successfully live-tested by Lynch on 24 July 1946, who ejected from a Gloster Meteor travelling at 320 mph (510 km/h) IAS at 8,000 feet (2,400 m) over Chalgrove Airfield in Oxfordshire.

The first production Martin-Baker ejection seat, a 'Pre-Mk 1', was installed in the Saunders-Roe SR.A/1 prototype.

The first use of an ejection seat in a practical application by a British pilot involved the Armstrong Whitworth A.W.52 flying wing experimental aircraft in May 1949.

Martin-Baker was a pioneer in expanding the operational envelope of the ejection seat to enable it to be used at low altitudes and airspeeds, leading eventually to development of the "zero-zero" capability in 1961.

== Applications ==
=== Martin-Baker Mk.1 ===
- Avro Canada CF-100 Canuck
- English Electric Canberra
- Gloster Meteor
- Hawker Hunter
- Hawker Sea Hawk
- Supermarine Attacker
- Supermarine Swift
- Westland Wyvern

=== Martin-Baker Mk.2 ===
- Avro Canada CF-100 Canuck
- de Havilland DH.112 Venom
- English Electric Canberra
- Gloster Meteor
- Hawker Hunter
- Hawker Sea Hawk
- Supermarine Attacker
- Supermarine Swift
- Westland Wyvern

=== Martin-Baker Mk.3 ===
- Avro Vulcan
- BAC 221
- de Havilland DH.100 Vampire
- English Electric Canberra
- Fairey Delta 2
- Gloster Javelin
- Handley Page Victor
- Hawker Hunter
- Supermarine Swift
- Vickers Valiant

=== Martin-Baker Mk.4 ===
- Aermacchi MB-326
- BAC 167 Strikemaster
- Dassault Étendard IV
- Dassault Mirage III
- Dassault Mystère
- Dassault M.D.450 Ouragan
- Dassault/Dornier Alpha Jet
- Fiat G-91R
- de Havilland DH.100 Vampire
- English Electric Canberra
- English Electric Lightning
- HAL Ajeet
- HAL HF-24 Marut
- HAL HJT-16 Kiran
- Hawker Hunter
- SEPECAT Jaguar
- Sud-Ouest Aviation (SNCASO) S.O. 4050 Vautour II

=== Martin-Baker Mk.5 ===
- Dassault Mirage III
- Douglas F4D Skyray
- Grumman A-6 Intruder
- Grumman F11F/F-11 Tiger
- Grumman OV-1 Mohawk
- Lockheed T-33 Shooting Star
- Lockheed TRV-1 SeaStar
- McDonnell F3H Demon
- McDonnell Douglas F-4 Phantom (UK variants)
- North American FJ-4 Fury
- North American F-86D Sabre
- North American F-100 Super Sabre
- Republic F-84F Thunderstreak
- Republic RF-84F Thunderflash
- Vought F-8 Crusader

=== Martin-Baker Mk.6 ===
- Atlas Impala
- Atlas Cheetah
- Blackburn Buccaneer
- Dassault Balzac V
- Dassault Mirage III
- Dassault Ouragan
- Dassault-Breguet Super Étendard
- Dornier Do 31
- Fiat G.91
- FMA IA 58 Pucará
- Hawker Siddeley P.1127
- Hunting H.126
- IAI Dagger
- IAI Kfir

=== Martin-Baker Mk.7 ===
- EWR VJ 101
- Grumman A-6 Intruder
- Grumman F-9 Cougar
- Grumman F-14 Tomcat
- Lockheed F-104 Starfighter
- McDonnell Douglas F-4 Phantom II
- Northrop F-5
- Grumman EA-6B Prowler
- Vought F-8 Crusader

=== Martin-Baker Mk.8 ===
- Embraer EMB 312 Tucano
- BAC TSR-2

=== Martin-Baker Mk.9 ===
- Dornier Do 31
- Hawker Siddeley Harrier
- Nord 500
- SEPECAT Jaguar
- VFW VAK 191B

=== Martin-Baker Mk.10 ===
- Aermacchi MB-339
- Aermacchi S-211
- AMX International AMX
- Atlas Cheetah
- BAE Systems Hawk
- British Aerospace Sea Harrier
- CASA C-101
- Chengdu FT-5, trainer export version of the Shenyang J-5
- Chengdu F-7 / Guizhou F-7
- Guizhou FT-7
- Dassault/Dornier Alpha Jet
- Dassault Mirage 2000
- Dassault Rafale
- Embraer EMB 314 Super Tucano
- FMA IA 63 Pampa
- Fouga 90
- Hongdu JL-8
- IAI Kfir
- IAR 99
- McDonnell Douglas F/A-18 Hornet
- Northrop F-5
- Panavia Tornado
- Rockwell-MBB X-31
- Saab JAS 39 Gripen
- Shenyang F-6
- Short Tucano
- Soko J-22 Orao
- Soko G-4 Super Galeb

=== Martin-Baker Mk.11 ===
- Pilatus PC-7 Turbo Trainer
- Pilatus PC-9
- PZL-130TC Orlik

=== Martin-Baker Mk.12 ===
- Hawker Siddeley Harrier

=== Martin-Baker Mk.14 NACES (SJU-17) ===
This ejection seat is used by the US Navy and is often designated Martin-Baker NACES (Naval Aircrew Common Ejection Seat) SJU-17 with a suffix letter for the different variants.

- Grumman F-14D Tomcat
- McDonnell Douglas F/A-18 Hornet
- McDonnell Douglas T-45 Goshawk

=== Martin-Baker Mk.15 ===
- Pilatus PC-7 Mk II
- UTVA Kobac

=== Martin-Baker Mk.16 ===
- Aero L-39 Skyfox
- Alenia Aermacchi M-346 Master
- Beechcraft T-6 Texan II
- Dassault Rafale
- Eurofighter Typhoon
- TAI Hürkuş
- Lockheed Martin F-35 Lightning II
- Northrop T-38 Talon
- Pilatus PC-21
- HAL Tejas
- Northrop F-5
- JF-17 Thunder

=== Martin-Baker Mk.17 ===
Extremely compact and lightweight ejection seat designed with minimise mass and maintenance. Most lightweight ejection seat in Martin-Baker inventory.

- Grob G 120TP

=== Martin-Baker Mk.18 ===
- KAI KF-21 Boramae
- Lockheed Martin F-16V Viper
- TAI TF Kaan
- TAI Hürjet
- Freedom Jet Trainer Aircraft

== Operations ==
The Martin-Baker company uses its own airfield, Chalgrove Airfield, in Oxfordshire for operational testing of ejection seats. In 2016, ejection tests were carried out at Cazaux Air Base; the company's Meteor aircraft testbeds were flown from Chalgrove to France for them.

Two Gloster Meteor T.7 aircraft, WL419 and WA638, remain in service with the company as flying testbeds. Another Meteor (WA634), used in early development of ejection seats, is retained at the Royal Air Force Museum Midlands, Cosford.

== Ejection Tie Club ==
Martin-Baker also sponsors an "Ejection Tie Club", producing a tie, patch, certificate, tie pin and membership card for those whose lives have been saved by a Martin-Baker ejection seat. The company also partnered with Bremont to produce a limited-edition wristwatch for members of the club. The watch must be purchased privately, though Martin-Baker does subsidize its cost. As of 2026, there are now over 7,800 registered members of the club since it was founded in 1957.

== Red Arrows pilot incident ==
In 2011, Red Arrows pilot Flt. Lt. Sean Cunningham was ejected from his Hawk T1 jet on the ground at RAF Scampton. The parachute failed to deploy and Cunningham was killed. On 22 January 2018, company director John Martin entered a guilty plea to breaching Section 3(1) of the Health and Safety at Work etc. Act 1974 on behalf of Martin-Baker wherein he admitted that the company had been aware of a technical problem with the ejector seat since 1990, but failed to notify the RAF. The firm admitted the health and safety breach on the basis it had failed to provide a written warning to the RAF about over-tightening a bolt on the aircraft.
