= James Martin (engineer) =

Northern Irish aerospace engineer and co-founder of Martin-Baker (1893–1981)

Sir James Martin CBE FIMechE FRAeS CEng
- Born: 11 September 1893; Crossgar, County Down, Ireland
- Died: 5 January 1981 (aged 87); Southlands Manor, Denham, Buckinghamshire, England, United Kingdom
- Resting place: St. Mary the Virgin Churchyard, Denham, Buckinghamshire, England
- Occupation: Engineer
- Known for: Inventor of the ejection seat and founder of the Martin-Baker aircraft company
- Spouse: Muriel Haines
- Children: 4
- Parent(s): Thomas Martin & Sarah Coulter

Sir James Martin (11 September 1893 – 5 January 1981) was a British engineer who together with Captain Valentine Baker founded the Martin-Baker aircraft company, which is a leading producer of aircraft ejection seats.

== Life ==
James Martin was born 11 September 1893 in the townland of Killinchy-in-the-Woods, known locally as Killinchy Woods (birthplace on what is now called Glasswater Road), Crossgar, County Down in Ireland. He established his own engineering firm in 1929.

In 1934, he and Valentine Baker formed Martin-Baker; Captain Baker took the test pilot role. It was in a crash of their third design, the MB 3, that Baker was killed.

In 1964 Martin was awarded the Gold Medal of the Royal Aero Club.

In 2004, Martin was inducted into the International Air & Space Hall of Fame at the San Diego Air & Space Museum.

== Commemoration ==
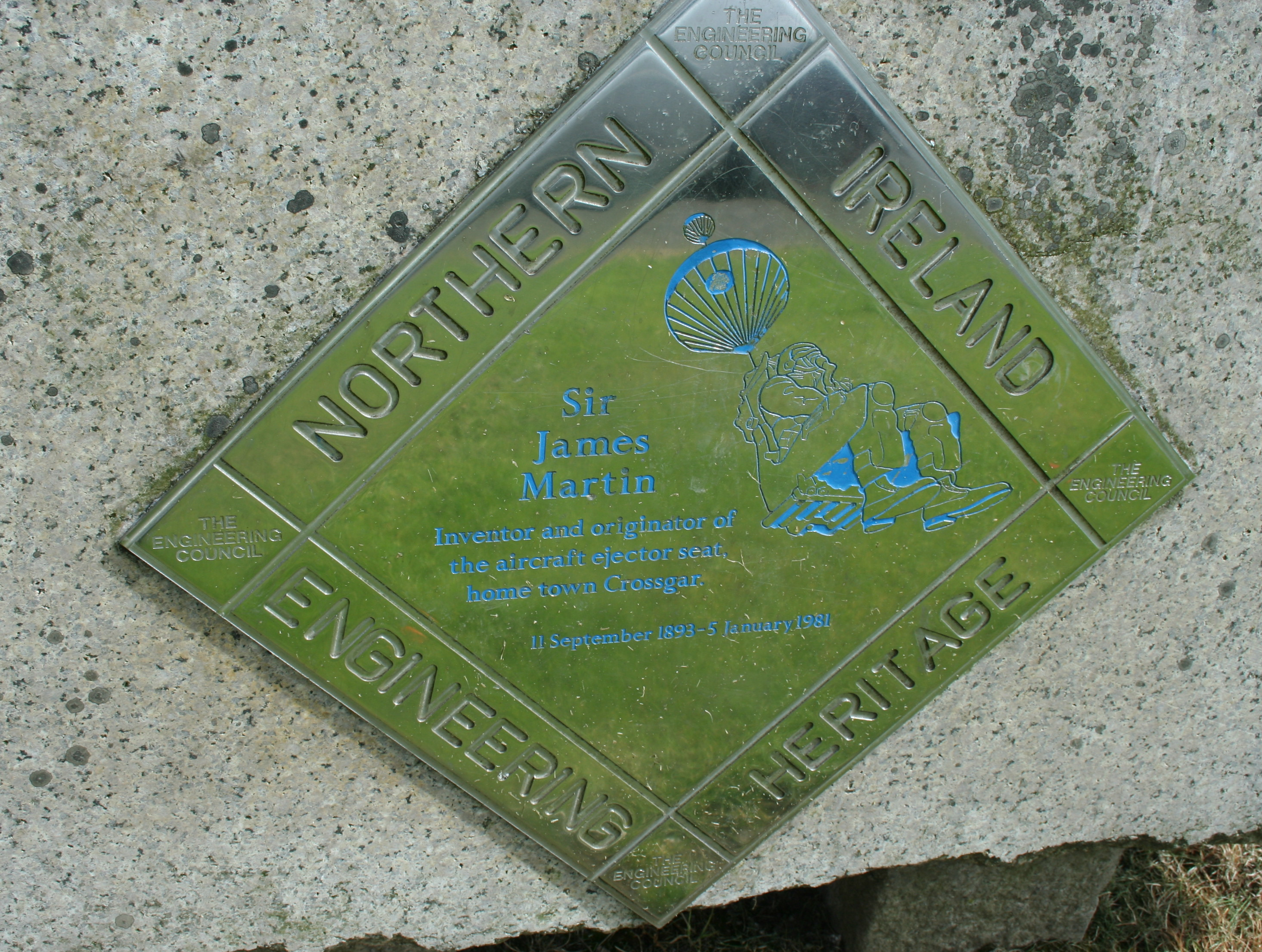
Plaque commemorating Sir James Martin in his home town of Crossgar

Martin's contribution to engineering was commemorated by the Northern Bank in its Inventor series of banknotes, which featured his portrait on the bank's £100 note. The note was discontinued in 2013 when the bank reissued its banknotes under the new Danske Bank brand.
