= Martin-Baker MB 5 =

British fighter prototype

MB 5
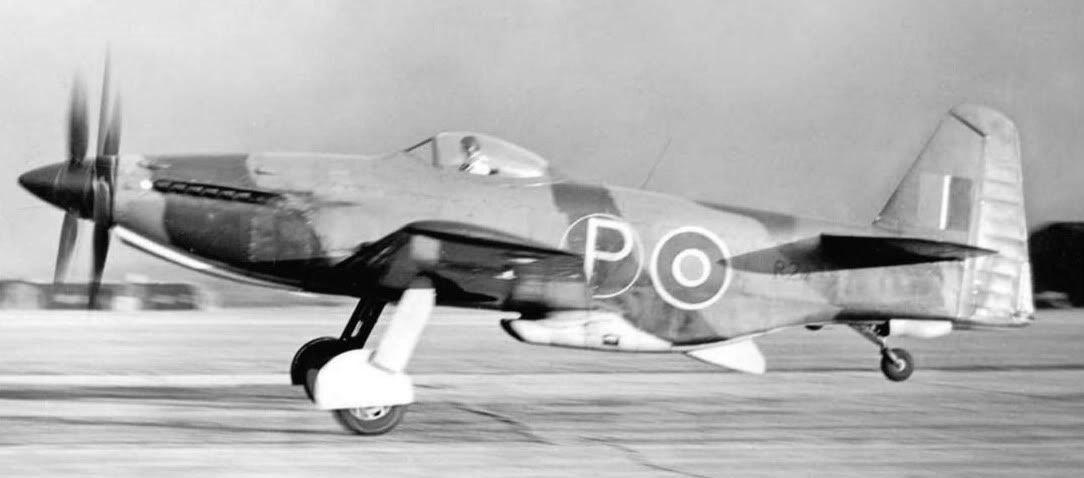

General information
- Type: Fighter
- National origin: United Kingdom
- Manufacturer: Martin-Baker
- Status: Experimental
- Primary user: Royal Air Force (intended)
- Number built: 1

History
- First flight: 23 May 1944
- Developed from: Martin-Baker MB 3

The British Martin-Baker MB 5 was the ultimate development of a series of prototype fighter aircraft built during the Second World War. Neither the MB 5 nor its predecessors ever entered production, despite what test pilots described as excellent performance.

== Design and development ==
Martin-Baker Aircraft began the MB 5 as the second Martin-Baker MB 3 prototype, designed to Air Ministry Specification F.18/39 for an agile, sturdy Royal Air Force fighter, able to fly faster than 400 mph (640 km/h). After the first MB 3 crashed in 1942, killing Val Baker, the second prototype was delayed. The late delivery of the first MB.3 had already lost any chance of a production contract. A modified MB 3 with a Rolls-Royce Griffon engine, rather than the Napier Sabre of the MB 3, was planned as the MB 4 (Note: The Bristol Centaurus was considered at one stage for the MB.4), but a full redesign was chosen instead.

The redesigned aircraft, designated MB 5, used wings similar to the MB 3, but had an entirely new steel-tube fuselage. Power came from a Rolls-Royce Griffon 83 liquid-cooled V-12 engine, producing 2,340 hp (1,745 kW) and driving two three-bladed contra-rotating propellers. Armament was four 20 mm Hispano cannon (reduced from the MB.3's six), mounted in the wings outboard of the widely spaced retractable undercarriage. A key feature of the design was ease of manufacture and maintenance: much of the structure was box-like, favouring straight lines and simple conformation. It was built under the F.18/39 contract which covered the building of three MB 3.

== Flight testing ==
The first flight of the MB 5 prototype, serial R2496, took place on 23 May 1944. Performance was considered outstanding by test pilots, and the cockpit layout was praised by the Aeroplane and Armament Experimental Establishment (A&AEE). The accessibility of the fuselage for maintenance was excellent, thanks to a system of detachable panels. According to test pilot Capt. Eric Brown (1948):

"In my opinion this is an outstanding aircraft, particularly when regarded in the light of the fact that it made its maiden flight as early as 23rd May 1944"

Acknowledged as one of the best aerobatic pilots in the UK, Squadron Leader Janusz Żurakowski, test pilot at the A&AEE at RAF Boscombe Down gave a display at the Farnborough Air Show in June 1946, with the Martin-Baker MB 5, an aircraft he considered superlative and better in many ways than the Spitfire.

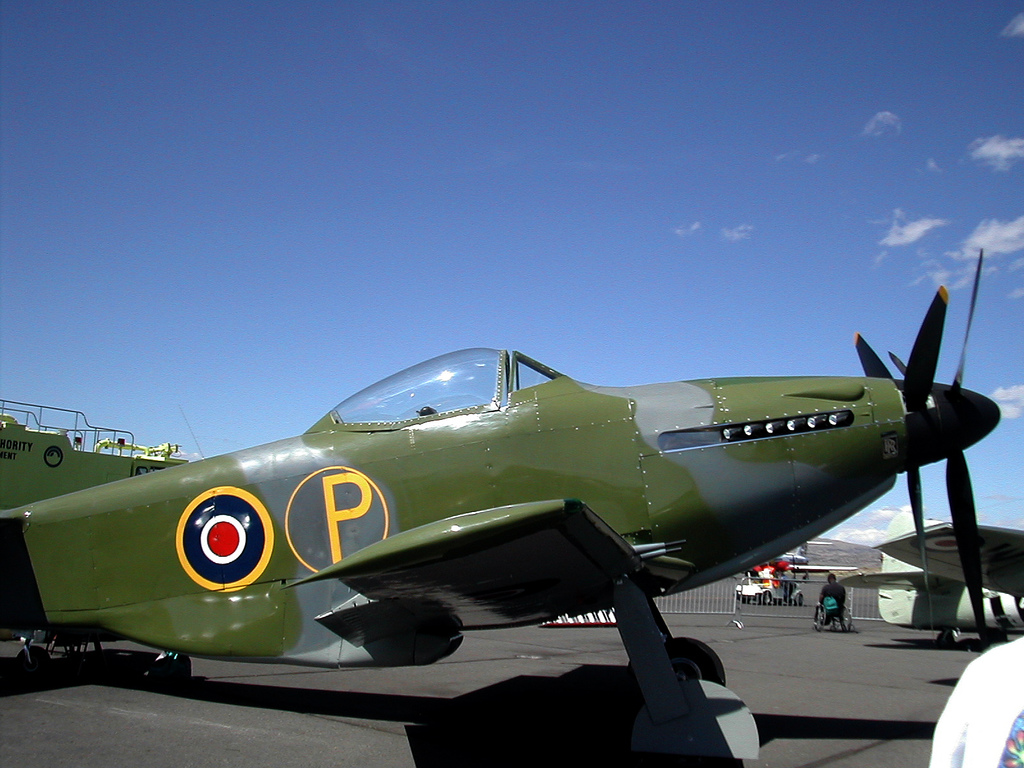
An MB 5 replica, nearing completion as of 2006.

If serial production had been authorised, the aircraft would have served over Germany during the Second World War. Instead, the RAF directed its attention towards jet-powered fighters. The Rolls-Royce Griffon engine failed when the MB 5 was being demonstrated to Prime Minister Winston Churchill, the Chief of the Air Staff and a host of other VIPs at an important display of British and captured German aircraft at Farnborough. Michael Bowyer states that Martin-Baker may have lacked both facilities and sufficient government support to engage in large-scale production. The company's slow progress in preparing the machine was partly due to a lack of facilities.

The original MB 5 was reputedly destroyed on a gunnery range. Martin-Baker went on to become one of the world's leading builders of ejection seats.

== Replica construction ==
A partial replica was built in Reno, Nevada, USA by John Marlin using wings from a P-51 Mustang. By April 2017 the replica had been completed and was for sale. It was built 6 ft shorter than the original, and may not be in flyable condition.

== Specifications (MB 5, as designed) ==
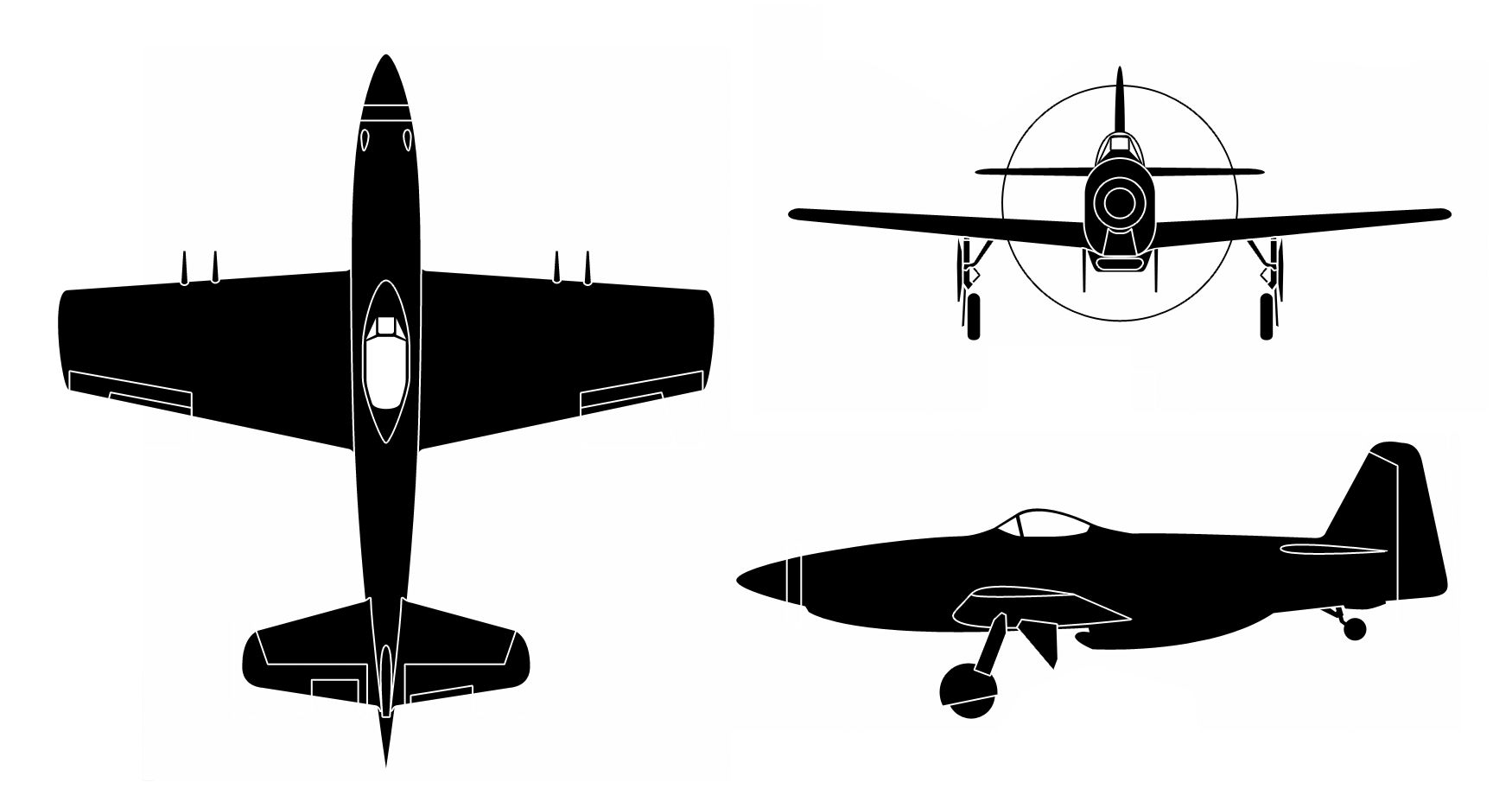
Orthographically projected diagram of the Martin-Baker MB 5

Data from Jane's all the World's Aircraft 1947, Jane's Fighting Aircraft of World War II and British Aircraft of World War II

General characteristics

- Crew: 1
- Length: 37 ft 9 in (11.51 m)
- Wingspan: 35 ft (11 m)
- Height: 12 ft 6 in (3.81 m) including propeller
- Wing area: 263 sq ft (24.4 m^{2})
- Aspect ratio: 4.66
- Airfoil: RAF 34
- Empty weight: 9,233 lb (4,188 kg)
- Gross weight: 11,500 lb (5,216 kg)
- Max takeoff weight: 12,090 lb (5,484 kg)
- Fuel capacity: 200 imp gal (240 US gal; 910 L) fuel; 14 imp gal (17 US gal; 64 L) oil
- Powerplant: 1 × Rolls-Royce Griffon 83 V-12 liquid-cooled piston engine, 2,035 hp (1,517 kW) (Note: for 5 minutes at 550 ft (170 m) in M gear, at 2750 rpm with 25 psi (170 kPa) boost)
- Propellers: 6-bladed De Havilland constant-speed contra-rotating propeller (Note: Hydromatic 11 ft 9 in (3.58 m) SKP 74489/15A front with 11.6 ft (3.54 m) 3-bladed SKP 74490/18A rear)

Performance

- Maximum speed: 460 mph (740 km/h, 400 kn) at 20,000 ft (6,100 m)
- Range: 1,100 mi (1,800 km, 960 nmi)
- Service ceiling: 40,000 ft (12,000 m)
- Rate of climb: 3,800 ft/min (19.3 m/s)
- Wing loading: 45.9 lb/sq ft (224 kg/m^{2})
- Power/mass: 0.159 hp/lb (0.262 kW/kg)

Armament

- Guns: 4 × 20 mm Hispano Mk.II cannon

== See also ==
Related development

- Martin-Baker MB 3

Aircraft of comparable role, configuration, and era

- CAC CA-15
- Fisher P-75
- Hawker Sea Fury
- Messerschmitt Me 309
- North American P-51 Mustang
- Supermarine Spiteful

Related lists

- List of aircraft of World War II
