= Emergency fighter =

Type of military aircraft

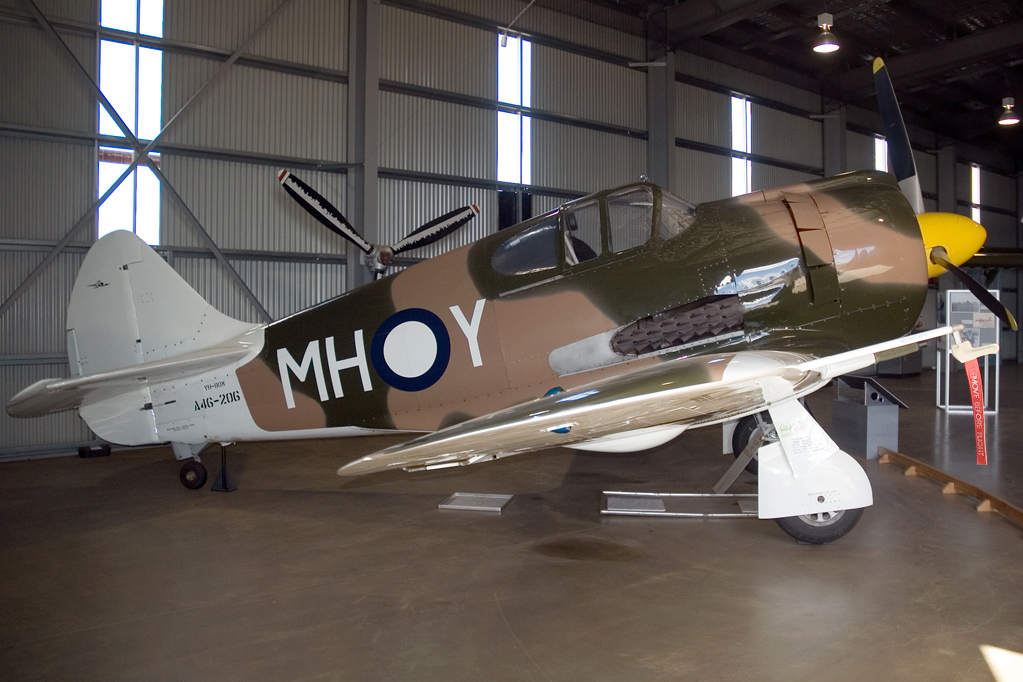
A preserved Australian CAC Boomerang. This was one of the most effective types of emergency fighter to enter service in WW2, but was mainly used in the ground attack role once the war situation had improved

An emergency fighter is an aircraft designed or adapted for use as a fighter at short notice, during an emergency period in war.

== Origins ==
The crisis which gives rise to an emergency fighter may have been the sudden outbreak of war, which resulted in a country lacking sufficient fighter aircraft. This was the case for Australia at the beginning of the Pacific War in World War II; with both the UK and the USA committing its production capacity to supplying their own needs, they had to create their own indigenous design resulting in the Commonwealth Boomerang.

An emergency fighter may also have been produced to meet a need for a particular sort of fighter aircraft. For instance, Britain’s Royal Air Force used hastily converted Bristol Blenheim light bombers as twin engined heavy fighters. A materials shortage arising in the course of conflict may have led to experiments with new kinds of fighters, like the Finnish VL Humu, which was based on the American Brewster F2A Buffalo, but with a higher proportion of wood in its construction.

Emergency fighters were also designed to a tight time scale in a crisis situation, in the hope that a new aircraft might be able to change a nation’s fortunes. Most famous of these was undoubtedly the Heinkel He 162 jet aircraft of Germany.

Many examples of the emergency fighter concept date from the Second World War. In that global conflict, situations of strategic national emergency arose in several nations due to total war. At the same time, fighter design was still sufficiently simple that an aircraft designed and produced in a matter of months had some chance of being effective.

== Approaches ==
Some emergency fighters were aircraft designed for other purposes but pressed into service to meet an immediate need. In early 1942 eight Australian CAC Wirraway trainer and general purpose military aircraft were used to intercept a Japanese raid on Rabaul, with disastrous effects when all the defenders were shot down. Some Russian Sukhoi Su-2 light bombers were used as fighters during the opening days of Operation Barbarossa when nothing else was available.

To meet the challenge posed by a shortage of strategic materials like the light alloys used in aircraft construction, several prototype emergency fighters were designed to use more readily available materials. For example, the British Martin-Baker MB 2 used a simple design made from steel tubes, while the VL Myrsky used much plywood. However, less strategically important materials like steel or wood tended to affect the performance of the aircraft adversely.

=== Adaptation of existing aircraft ===
The advantage of adapting existing aircraft was that the emergency fighter could be produced quickly. A variety of aircraft types were used: the Bristol Blenheim light bomber lacked performance in its intended role as a heavy day fighter, but found a useful niche as a strike fighter in Coastal Command and as a night fighter, pioneering the use of airborne intercept radar; the Soviet Ilyushin Il-2 was occasionally used to escort other Sturmoviks on ground attack missions; and 26 British Miles Masters were produced, but never used, as the M.24 Master fighter with a single seat and six wing guns.

Modern attack aircraft are usually equipped to carry short-range air-to-air missiles for self-defense; some airforces because of inventory shortages will task their attack aircraft with a secondary air-to-air role, for example as with the Portuguese A-7 Corsair II squadrons. During the late 1980s and early 1990s the United Kingdom planned to use their BAe Hawk trainer aircraft as point-defence fighters.

=== New designs ===
Very few new emergency fighter designs progressed beyond the prototype stage. Of those that did, the Commonwealth Boomerang was probably the most successful, but even then it was most effectively used in the ground support role. The Heinkel He 162 entered mass production and even squadron service, shooting down some opponents, but its effectiveness was limited by a dire shortage of fuel in the collapsing Reich.

Other designs which did not enter service included the British Miles M.20, which had a similar performance to the contemporary Hawker Hurricane; and the American Bell XP-77.

== Impact ==
Very few emergency fighters entered service, and of those that did, even fewer types achieved effectiveness in operations. Reasons for these failures include:

- Time scale: Even though emergency fighters were produced to a tight time scale (the He 162 flew within 5 months of design work beginning), by the time they were ready for combat, events had usually moved on. Either the crisis had passed (as with the Miles M.20 which first flew as the Battle of Britain was being won), or it had deepened so far that rescue was impossible (as occurred with the Bachem Ba 349).
- Performance: Conversions from existing aircraft were usually inadequate as frontline fighters, although some like the Bristol Blenheim IF found useful employment elsewhere. Likewise emergency fighters which used non-strategic materials usually suffered in performance, although they could be used for other roles, like the VL Myrsky which was used for reconnaissance. Sometimes the rush into production meant that the emergency fighter was positively dangerous to all but the best pilots, like the He 162.

== List by country of origin ==
=== Australia ===
- CAC Wirraway
- CAC Boomerang

=== Canada ===
- Diemert Defender was designed in the Cold War as a strike aircraft against the possibility of invading soviet troops. The project was later documented into a film.

=== Finland ===
- VL Humu
- VL Myrsky

=== France ===
- Caudron C.714 Designed as a wooden lightweight fighter to increase fighter numbers without affecting production capacity of other fighters, but ineffective in service

=== Germany ===
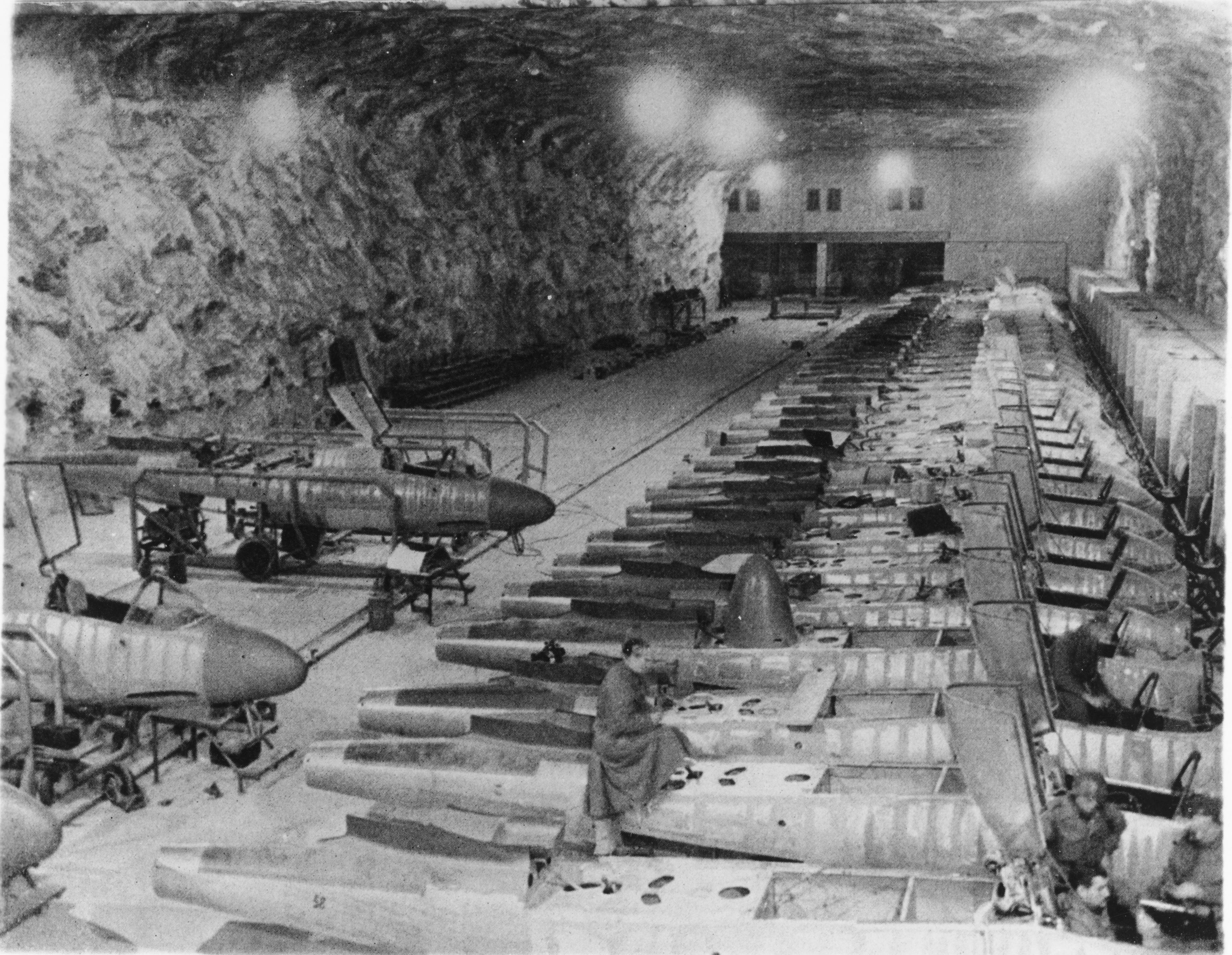
Heinkel He 162 Volksjäger fighters that were captured by the US Army while they were under production in an underground factory. Few of the type ever flew and they proved poorly designed.

In the final years of the war, Nazi Germany produced a wide array of radical aircraft concepts. Some of these did not progress beyond initial design stages. An emergency fighter competition was also launched to develop jet aircraft with great performance advantages over Allied aircraft.

- Bachem Ba 349
- Blohm & Voss BV 40 glider
- Heinkel He 162
- Focke-Wulf Volksjäger

=== Italy ===
- Ambrosini SAI.207
- Ambrosini SAI.403

=== Japan ===
- Kawasaki Ki-100 Produced as an emergency measure by adapting a Ki-61-II-KAI to carry a radial engine, the Ki-100 emerged as an outstanding fighter.
- Mizuno Shinryu

=== Soviet Union ===
- Ilyushin Il-2 was used as an attack and bomber aircraft, with fighter escort. Special fighter versions - Il-1 and Il-16 - considered, but never entered service.
- Sukhoi Su-2
- Petlyakov Pe-2 dive bomber was used for escort missions over the sea for missions beyond the combat radius of single-engine fighters in 1941 before the Pe-3 fighter was available

=== Sweden ===
Neutral Sweden built up its airforce during World War II, in an effort to deter potential aggressors. It was difficult to obtain foreign built aircraft, so new designs were built locally.

- FFVS 22

=== United Kingdom ===
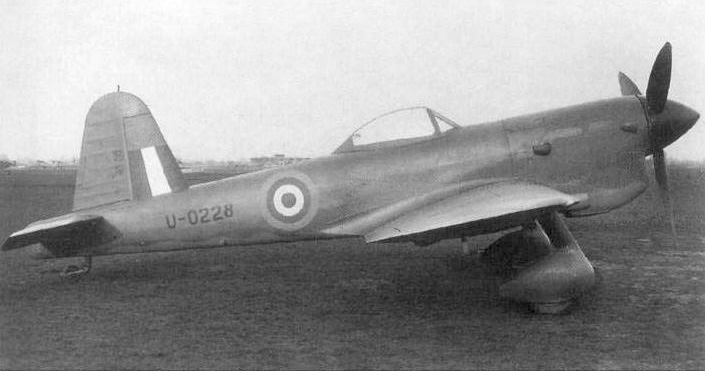
A Miles M.20 prototype

The crisis point for the British RAF came at the Battle of Britain, and British use of emergency fighters centres on this time.

- Boulton Paul P.94 – experimenting with a turretless Boulton Paul Defiant
- Bristol Blenheim Mk IF and Mk IVF
- Martin-Baker MB 2
- Miles M.20 - designed, built, and flown in 9 weeks.
- Miles M.24 version of Miles Master
- Percival Mew Gull racing aircraft, plans to fit a pair of machine guns did not proceed.
- Douglas Boston bombers converted into interim night fighters

=== United States ===
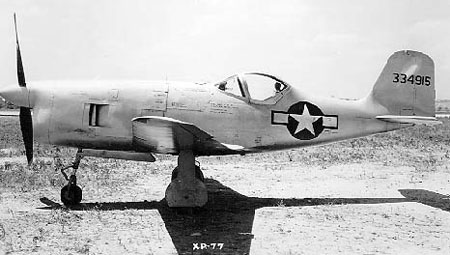
One of the two Bell XP-77 prototypes

The vast manufacturing resources of the USA, and its lack of vulnerability to invasion, meant that emergency fighters were not extensively developed. Only the Bell XP-77 lightweight fighter using non-strategic materials could be considered akin to an emergency fighter.

However, the United States Navy did use the SBD Dauntless dive-bomber as combat air patrol aircraft in emergencies, including during the Battle of Coral Sea. On 8 May 1942, Pilot Stanley "Swede" Vejtasa claimed three A6M Zeroes shot down when his scouting squadron was pressed into service to defend the USS Yorktown.
