= Ambrosini SAI.207 =

Italian fighter aircraft

SAI.207
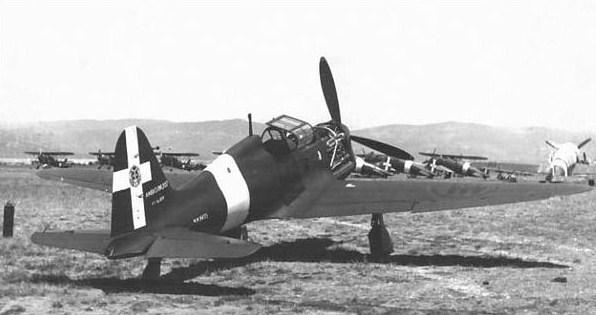

General information
- Type: Light fighter
- Manufacturer: Società Aeronautica Italiana / Ambrosini
- Designer: Sergio Stefanutti
- Primary user: Regia Aeronautica
- Number built: 14

History
- First flight: Spring 1941
- Variants: Ambrosini SAI.403

The Ambrosini SAI.207 was a light fighter interceptor and developed in Italy during World War II. Developed from the pre-war SAI.7 racing aircraft it was built entirely from wood, Powered by a single 750 hp Isotta Fraschini Delta, the SAI.207 enjoyed limited success during evaluation of the 12 pre-production aircraft.

== Development ==
The SAI.207 was developed from the Ambrosini SAI.7 racing and sporting monoplane after the light fighter concept had been proven with the Ambrosini SAI.207 prototype. Stefanutti designed the aircraft to have a lightweight structure and light armament to allow lower-powered engines to be used, without unduly reducing performance.

The first of three prototypes was completed and flown in the autumn of 1940. The SAI.207 was a fighter development of the SAI.7, with identical dimensions, apart from length, at 8.02 m (26 ft 4 in) and the 402.7 kW (540 hp) Isotta Fraschini Gamma engine. Weighing only 1,000 kg (2,205 lb) the Sai.107 reached a speed of 563 km/h (350 mph) in trials held at the Guidonia research establishment and manoeuvrability proved to be excellent. The SAI.107 was lost, along with pilot Arturo Ferrarin, in a crash on 18 July 1941.

Two more fighter prototypes were built as SAI.207s, flying for the first time in the spring of 1941 and 1942.

== Design ==
The SAI.207 was a single-seat, low-wing monoplane with a conventional tail-wheel undercarriage, developed from the Ambrosini SAI.7. Its lightweight wooden construction, combined with a 560 kW (751 hp) Isotta Fraschini Delta R.C.40 inverted-V engine, with a center-line cooling air intake, provided speed and agility. Armament consisted of two fuselage-mounted 12.7 mm (0.500 in) Breda-SAFAT machine guns.

In level-flight the performance of the SAI.207 was impressive. It achieved a speed of 580 km/h (360 mph) and over 800 km/h (497 mph) in a dive. The Ministero dell'Aeronautica soon placed a production order for 2,000 machines, plus a pre-production batch of 12 aircraft for operational testing. After the mixed results of operational evaluation and the signing of the Armistice, no production aircraft were built.

== Operational history ==
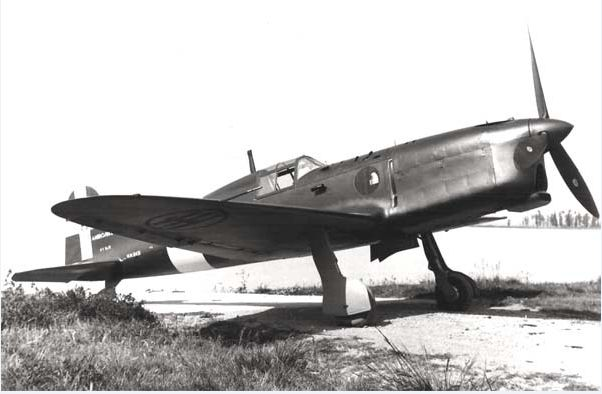
Ambrosini SAI.207

Flight testing revealed some major shortcomings, most of which were not rectified before the Armistice with the Allies in 1943; the low power and high wing loading resulted in poor climb performance; the light structure prevented more powerful cannon from being used as the recoil forces overstressed the mounting structure; the rear cylinders of the engine overheated during recovery from a dive; the light structure also led to problems, with the second prototype wing exploding during a dive recovery due to internal pressure built up, caused by the lack of internal fairings in the undercarriage bays. The wooden structure was also badly affected by rain or humidity.

The pre-production batch of 12 aircraft served briefly with three squadrons. The first was 83rd Squadriglia, 18 Gruppo, 3 Stormo, led by Guglielmo Specker, one of the Regia Aeronauticas best known "aces", at Cerveteri airfield, near Rome. The aircraft entered service in July 1943, flying a number of combat missions against heavy Allied raids over the Italian capital, but without success. After one month, they were sent to Castiglione del Lago G. Eleuteri airfield (at that time one of the main Regia Aeronautica training airbases and near Ambrosini's factory), where it was planned that 161 and 162nd Squadriglia would take the aircraft into service.

Despite its speed, Italian pilots were not impressed by the type and its service in the summer of 1943 quickly ended. The aircraft of 83rd Squadriglia were returned to SAI-Ambrosini to be refurbished, but the Armistice made it impossible for them to return to their squadron.

== Specifications (SAI.207) ==
Data from Italian Civil and Military aircraft 1930–1945

General characteristics

- Crew: 1
- Length: 8.0 m (26 ft 3.75 in)
- Wingspan: 9.0 m (29 ft 6.5 in)
- Height: 2.87 m (9 ft 5 in)
- Wing area: 13.90 m^{2} (149.6 sq ft)
- Empty weight: 1,750 kg (3,858 lb)
- Gross weight: 2,415 kg (5,324 lb)
- Powerplant: 1 × Isotta Fraschini Delta III R.C.40 inverted V-12 engine, 560 kW (750 hp)

Performance

- Maximum speed: 641 km/h (398 mph, 346 kn)
- Cruise speed: 489 km/h (304 mph, 264 kn)
- Range: 850 km (528 mi, 459 nmi)
- Service ceiling: 12,000 m (39,400 ft)
- Rate of climb: 13.25 m/s (2,600 ft/min)
- Time to altitude: 6,000 m (20,000 ft) in 7 minutes 33 seconds

Armament

- Guns: 2 × 12.7 mm (0.500 in) Breda-SAFAT machine guns

== See also ==
Aircraft of comparable role, configuration, and era

- Bell XP-77
- Caudron C.714
- Douglas XP-48
- Miles M.20
- Roussel R-30
- Tucker XP-57

Related lists

- List of aircraft of World War II
- List of aircraft of Italy in World War II
