= Douglas XP-48 =

Light fighter project for U.S. Air Force, cancelled 1940

XP-48
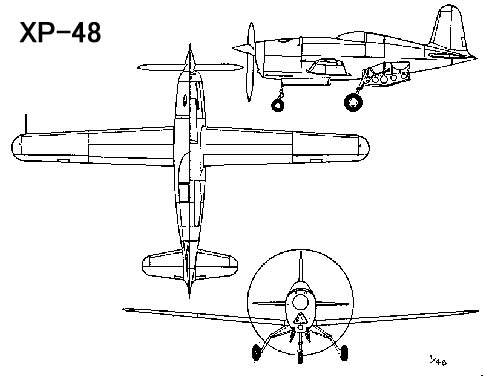

General information
- Type: Fighter aircraft
- National origin: United States
- Manufacturer: Douglas Aircraft Company
- Status: Cancelled 1940
- Primary user: United States Army Air Corps
- Number built: None

The Douglas XP-48 was a small, lightweight fighter aircraft, designed by Douglas Aircraft in 1939 for evaluation by the U.S. Army Air Corps. Intended to be powered by a small inline piston engine, the contract was cancelled before a prototype could be constructed, due to the Army's concerns about the projected performance of the aircraft.

== Inspiration ==
In the years before the outbreak of World War II, a number of countries became intrigued by the idea of developing a very light fighter aircraft, with these proposals often being derived from the design of racing aircraft. Following the consideration of a modified French Caudron racer by the U.S. Army Air Corps, a proposition that was considered uneconomical, Douglas Aircraft made an unsolicited proposal to the Army Air Corps of their Model 312 design in 1939.

== Design and cancellation ==
Intended to be powered by a Ranger XV-770 inverted V-12 engine equipped with a supercharger, Douglas' proposal was considered worth pursuing by the Army Air Corps, and on 5 August 1939 a single prototype was ordered. The Model 312 was given the Army designation XP-48, the 48th aircraft type in the Pursuit category.

Closely resembling the later Bell XP-77, the design of the XP-48 featured a wing of remarkably high aspect ratio, and was equipped with a pair of synchronized machine guns for armament, Douglas touted the XP-48 as offering outstanding performance, with a top speed of at least 350 miles per hour (560 km/h), and, according to Douglas' estimates, possibly as high as 525 miles per hour (845 km/h).

However, this very aspect of its design was regarded with suspicion by the Army Air Corps. The Ranger engine was suffering from development difficulties and delays and would never prove truly reliable. At the same time, Douglas' performance estimates became increasingly regarded as being over-optimistic. Accordingly, in February 1940 the Army cancelled the XP-48 contract, and without government funding Douglas ceased development of the aircraft.

== Specifications (XP-48) ==
Data from

General characteristics

- Crew: one (pilot)
- Length: 21 ft 9 in (6.63 m)
- Wingspan: 32 ft (9.8 m)
- Height: 9 ft (2.7 m)
- Wing area: 92 sq ft (8.5 m^{2})
- Empty weight: 2,675 lb (1,213 kg)
- Gross weight: 3,400 lb (1,542 kg)
- Fuel capacity: 50 US gallons (190 L; 42 imp gal)
- Powerplant: 1 × Ranger SGV-770 inverted V-12 liquid-cooled piston engine, 525 hp (391 kW)
- Propellers: 3-bladed, 9.5 ft (2.9 m) diameter

Performance

- Maximum speed: 350 mph (560 km/h, 300 kn)

Armament

- Guns: 1 .30 in (7.62 mm) and 1 .50 in (12.7 mm) machine guns.

== See also ==
Aircraft of comparable role, configuration, and era

- Ambrosini SAI.207
- Bell XP-77
- Caudron C.714
- Roussel R-30
- Miles M.20
- Tucker XP-57

Related lists

- List of fighter aircraft
- List of military aircraft of the United States
