= Bell XP-77 =

Experimental fighter aircraft

XP-77
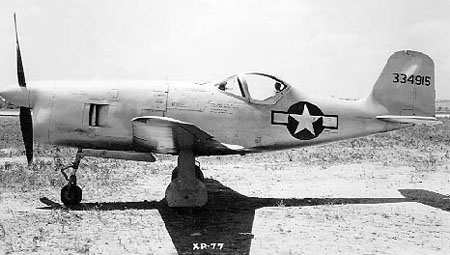

General information
- Type: Fighter aircraft
- Manufacturer: Bell Aircraft Corporation
- Primary user: U.S. Army Air Forces
- Number built: 2 prototypes

History
- First flight: 1 April 1944
- Retired: December 1944

The Bell XP-77 development was initiated by the United States Army Air Forces during World War II to produce a simplified "lightweight" fighter aircraft using non-strategic materials. Despite being innovative, the diminutive prototype proved tricky to handle and the project was canceled when the XP-77 did not deliver its projected performance.

== Design and development ==
The Tri-4 (Company designations, later changed to D-6) project with the Bell Aircraft Corporation was initiated in October 1941. Originally a design study to meet the USAAF specifications for a "very light" interceptor, the XP-77 was intended to be a small, light fighter much in the mold of the 1930s Thompson Trophy air racers.

On 16 May 1942, the USAAF recommended the construction and testing of 25 XP-77s. The aircraft featured a single-engine, low-wing monoplane with mainly wood construction, equipped with tricycle landing gear, a typical Bell feature that bestowed good ground handling. A bubble canopy also provided fair visibility except in the forward-downward direction due to the extended nose.

While originally conceived using an air-cooled 500 hp (370 kW) Ranger XV-770-9 12-cylinder engine with a supercharger, the prototypes were delivered with the non-supercharged XV-770-7 engine due to engine development delays. With the anticipated delivery time of the original engine delayed for one and a half years, Bell proposed that seven XP-77s be built using the seven XV-770-7 engines then available. The planned armament was one Hispano 20 mm cannon firing through the propeller hub (much like the larger caliber 37 mm cannon of the P-39 Airacobra) and two 0.5 inch (12.7 mm) M2 Browning machine guns, with the option of either a 300 lb (140 kg) bomb or 325 lb (147 kg) depth charge with the deletion of the cannon armament.

Inspection of the mockup on 21–22 September 1942 revealed concerns from both the manufacturer and the USAAF inspection team. Weight had crept up beyond the 3,700 lb (1,700 kg) design limit, and the program was experiencing delays; Bell had subcontracted the wooden construction because ongoing production demands had led to a lack of adequate company-owned facilities for XP-77 research and development. Bell asked for and received permission to reduce the production run of aircraft to two prototypes.

== Operational history ==
=== Testing ===
The XP-77 project suffered continuing delays, many related to excess weight. A change in subcontractor for the wing assembly caused problems when the first subcontractor refused to release necessary parts. Concerns over structural integrity relating to the glue and its binding properties were difficult to resolve. Anticipating that contract costs would soon be exceeded, and with no hope that the supercharged engine would become available, the USAAF decided to continue the project only to evaluate wooden construction in combat aircraft. The first XP-77 flew 1 April 1944 at Wright Field, but the flight tests revealed vibration problems stemming from the engine being mounted directly to the airframe without any vibration isolation. The long nose and rear-mounted cockpit also inhibited visibility relative to operational aircraft of the time.

The XP-77 proved to be difficult to fly, and despite lacking guns and armor, it did not approach its expected performance, mainly because it was woefully underpowered. Further trials were conducted at the USAAF Proving Ground at Eglin Field with the second aircraft, which was destroyed on 2 October 1944 when it entered an inverted spin while attempting an Immelmann, and the pilot bailed out. All development was terminated in December 1944.

=== Post-cancellation ===
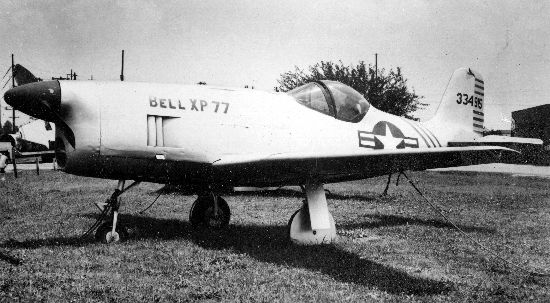
First XP-77 post-war with spurious markings and 1947-style roundels.

After the program's cancellation, the first prototype was sent to Wilbur Wright Field, then to Eglin Field, then back to Wright. The aircraft was seen at various airshows before being sent to an unknown air base as a gate guard. The aircraft remained on display for several years before deteriorating, after which it was burned.

== Specifications (Bell XP-77) ==
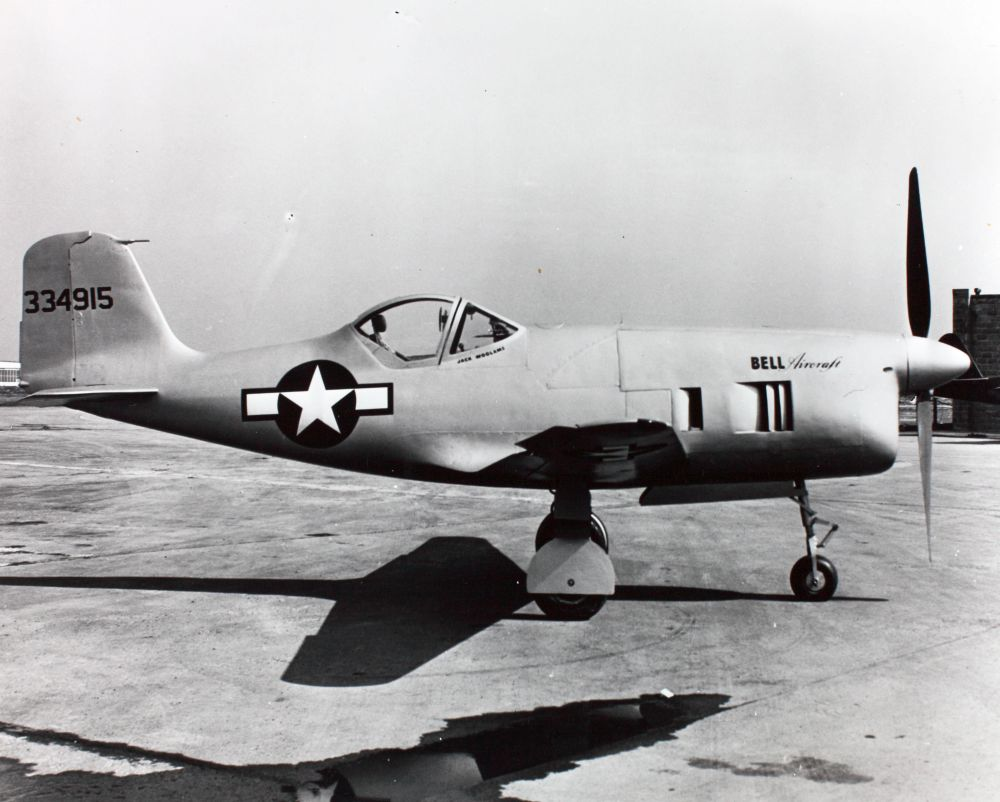
Bell XP-77 side view.

Data from Jane's Fighting Aircraft of World War II and

General characteristics

- Crew: 1
- Length: 22 ft 10 in (6.96 m)
- Wingspan: 27 ft 6 in (8.38 m)
- Height: 8 ft 2 in (2.49 m)
- Wing area: 100 sq ft (9.3 m^{2})
- Empty weight: 2,855 lb (1,295 kg)
- Max takeoff weight: 4,028 lb (1,827 kg)
- Powerplant: 1 × Ranger V-770-7 inverted V12 engine, 520 hp (388 kW)
- Propellers: 2-bladed

Performance

- Maximum speed: 330 mph (530 km/h, 290 kn)
- Range: 550 mi (890 km, 480 nmi)
- Service ceiling: 30,100 ft (9,180 m)
- Rate of climb: 3,600 ft/min (18.3 m/s)
- Wing loading: 40.28 lb/sq ft (196.5 kg/m^{2})
- Power/mass: .13 hp/lb (213 W/kg)

Armament

- Guns:
  - 1 × 20 mm (0.787 in) Hispano-Suiza HS.404 cannon, firing through the propeller.
  - 2 × .50 in (12.7 mm) M2 machine guns with 200 rounds each.
- Bombs:
  - 1 × 300 lb (136 kg) bomb or
  - 1 × 325 lb (147 kg) depth charge

== See also ==
Aircraft of comparable role, configuration, and era

- Ambrosini SAI.207
- Caudron C.714
- Douglas XP-48
- Miles M.20
- Roussel R-30
- Tucker XP-57
- VEF I-16
- Zlín XIII

Related lists

- List of aircraft of World War II

== Bibliography ==
- Bridgeman, Leonard, ed. "The Bell XP-77." Jane’s Fighting Aircraft of World War II. London: Studio, 1946. ISBN 1-85170-493-0.
- Buttler, Tony (2024). American Experimental Fighters of WWII: The Pursuit of Excellence. Crécy Publishing. ISBN 978-1-80035-310-7.
- Green, William. War Planes of the Second World War, Volume Four: Fighters. London: MacDonald & Co. (Publishers) Ltd., 1961 (Sixth impression 1969). ISBN 0-356-01448-7.
- Green, William and Gordon Swanborough. WW2 Aircraft Fact Files: US Army Air Force Fighters, Part 1. London: Macdonald and Jane's Publishers Ltd., 1977, pp. 25–26. ISBN 0-356-08218-0.
- O'Leary, Michael. USAAF Fighters of World War Two. Harrisburg, PA: Harrisburg Historical Times, 1986. ISBN 0-7137-1839-0.
- Schrader, Richard K. "Bell's Wooden Warrior." Air Classics, Volume 35, Number 4, May 1999.
- Townend, David R. Clipped Wings -- World War Two Edition. Markham: Aerofile Publications, 2010. ISBN 978-0-9732020-1-4.
- Winchester, Jim. The World's Worst Aircraft: From Pioneering Failures to Multimillion Dollar Disasters. London: Amber Books Ltd., 2005. ISBN 1-904687-34-2.
