= Caudron C.714 =

Fighter aircraft in the French Air Force

C.714
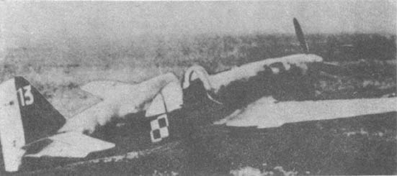
- Caudron CR.714 fighter plane of Groupe de Chasse I/145, June 1940

General information
- Type: Fighter
- Manufacturer: Caudron-Renault
- Designer: Marcel Riffard
- Primary users: Polish Air Force in France French Air Force; Finland
- Number built: approximately 90

History
- Manufactured: 1939–1940
- Introduction date: 1940
- First flight: 18 July 1936 (C.710)
- Retired: 1941 (Finland)

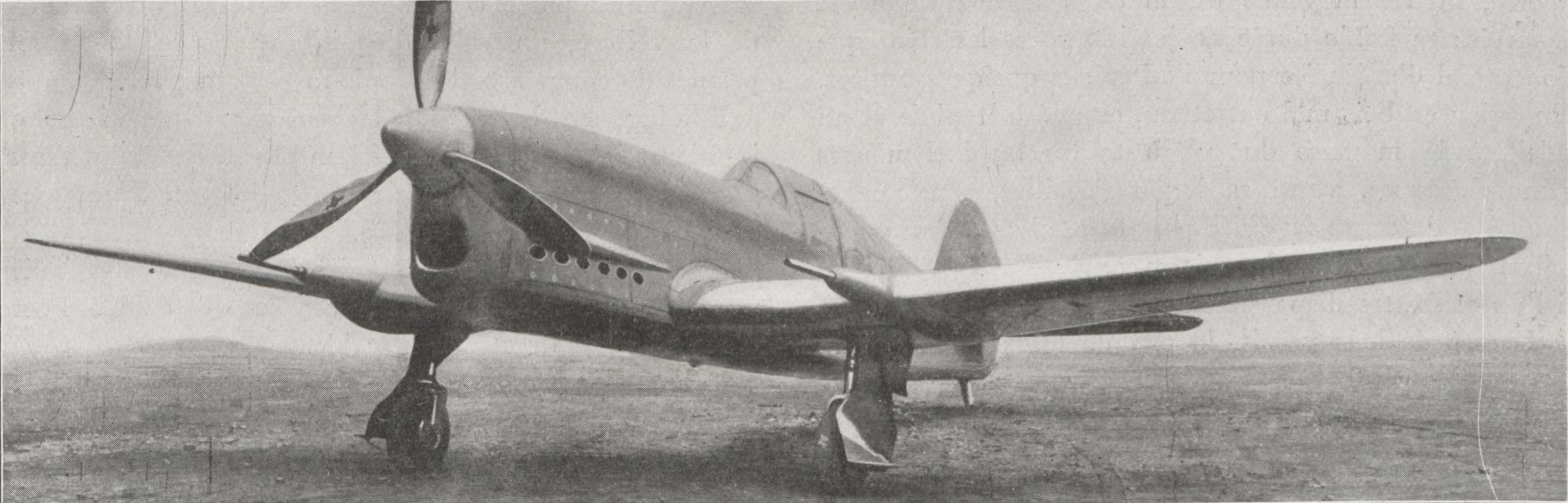
Caudron C.713

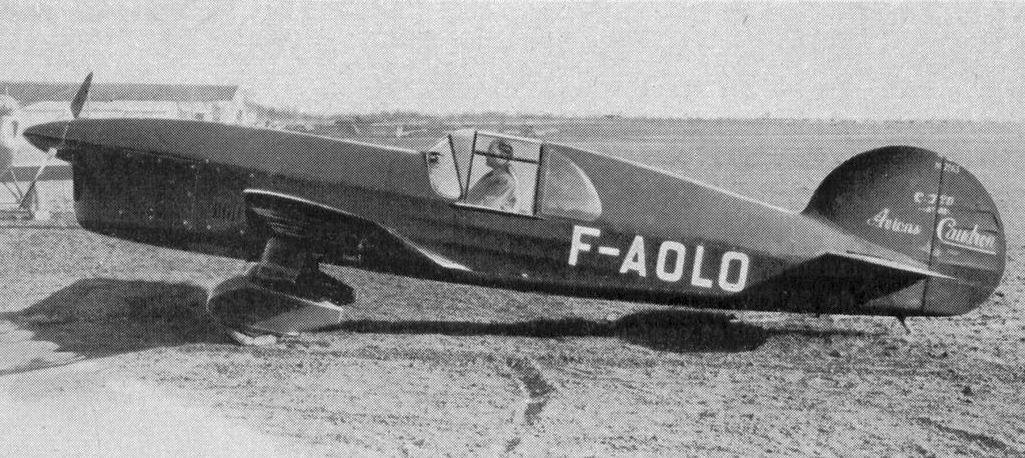
Caudron C.720 photo from Le Pontentiel Aérien Mondial 1936

The C.710 were a series of light fighter aircraft developed by Caudron-Renault for the French Air Force just prior to the start of World War II. One version, the C.714, saw limited production, and were assigned to Polish pilots flying in France after the fall of Poland in 1939. A small number was also supplied to Finland.

== Design and development ==
The original specification that led to the C.710 series was offered in 1936 in order to quickly raise the number of modern aircraft in French service, by supplying a "light fighter" of wooden construction which could be built rapidly in large numbers without upsetting the production of existing types. The contract resulted in three designs, the Arsenal VG-30, the Bloch MB.700, and the C.710. Prototypes of all three were ordered.

The original C.710 was a monoplane of all-wooden construction developed from an earlier series of air racers. One common feature of these aircraft was an extremely long nose, with the cockpit far back on the fuselage. It had a fixed spatted landing gear; the vertical stabilizer was semicircular. Armament consisted of a 20 mm Hispano-Suiza HS.9 cannon under each wing in a small pod, with 60 rounds per gun. The nose housed the 336 kW (450 hp) Renault 12R-01, a supercharged inverted air-cooled V-12 engine which was developed by putting together two Renault 6Q engines.

The C.710 prototype first flew on 18 July 1936. The C.710 had a speed of 455 km/h (283 mph; 246 kn) at 4,000 m (13,000 ft), but the Morane-Saulnier M.S.405 was finally selected instead, mainly due to its superior rate of climb. The prototype C.710 was destroyed in a crash on 1 February 1938.

The C.711 was a proposed racing aircraft which was not built and the C.712 was a version intended to break the World Air Speed Record. It used the fuselage of the C.710 with the wing of the Caudron C.580, while its Renault 613 engine, although basically the same as that of the C.710, had its power increased to 750 hp (560 kW) by increasing compression, allowed by the use of 100 Octane fuel. The C.712 made its first flight on 24 December 1936, but was destroyed in a crash at Istres on 29 April 1937 during a record attempt. The C.713, which flew on 15 December 1937, was a modified fighter which introduced retractable landing gear and a more conventional triangular vertical stabilizer.

The final evolution of the 710 series was the C.714 Cyclone, a variation on the C.713 which first flew in April 1938 as the C.714.01 prototype. The principal changes were a new wing airfoil section, a strengthened fuselage, and, instead of two cannon, four 7.5 mm MAC 1934 machine guns in the wing fairings. It was powered by the newer 12R-03 version of the engine, which introduced a new carburettor which could operate in negative g.

The French Air Force ordered 20 C.714s on 5 November 1938, with options for a further 180. Production started at the Renault factory in the Paris suburbs in summer 1939.

Other projected versions were the C.720 trainer with a 75 or 164 kW (100 or 220 hp) engine, the C.760 fighter with a 559 kW (750 hp) Isotta-Fraschini Delta engine, and the C.770 fighter with a 597 kW (800 hp) Renault V-engine. None of these reached production.

== Operational history ==
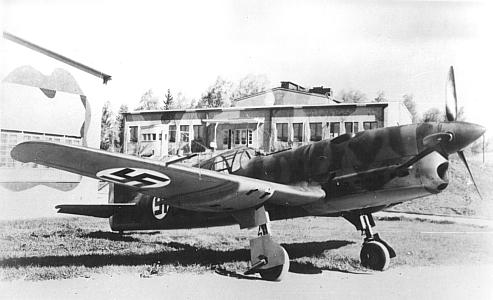
A Finnish C.714

Deliveries did not start until January 1940. After a series of tests with the first production examples, it became apparent that the design was seriously flawed. Although light and fast, its wooden construction did not permit a more powerful engine to be fitted. The original engine seriously limited its climb rate and maneuverability with the result that the Caudron was withdrawn from active service in February 1940. In March, the initial production order was reduced to 90, as the performance was not considered good enough to warrant further production contracts. Eighty were diverted to Finland to fight in the Winter War. These were meant to be flown by French pilots.

However, events in France resulted in only six aircraft being delivered, and an additional ten were waiting in the harbour when deliveries were stopped. The six aircraft that arrived were assembled, tested and given registrations CA-551 to CA-556. The aircraft were found to be too unreliable and dangerous to use in Finnish conditions, and were not committed to combat. Two of the aircraft were damaged during a transport flight to Pori. Further, the Finnish pilots found that it was difficult to start and land the aircraft from the air bases at the front. The aircraft were maintained on the roster until they were retired and scrapped on 30 December 1949. One example, CA-556 was transferred to the maintenance personnel school as an instructional airframe.

On 18 May 1940, 35 Caudrons were delivered to the Polish Warsaw Squadron, the Groupe de Chasse polonais I/145, stationed at the Mions airfield. After just 23 sorties, adverse opinion of the fighter was confirmed by frontline pilots who expressed concerns that it was seriously underpowered and was no match for contemporary German fighters.

On 25 May, only a week after it was introduced, French Minister of War Guy La Chambre ordered all C.714s to be withdrawn from active service. However, since the French authorities had no other aircraft to offer, the Polish pilots ignored the order and continued to fly the Caudrons. Despite flying a fighter hopelessly outdated compared to the Messerschmitt Bf 109E, the Polish pilots scored 12 confirmed and three unconfirmed victories in three battles between 8 June and 11 June, losing nine in the air and nine more on the ground. Among the aircraft shot down were four Dornier Do 17 bombers, and also three Messerschmitt Bf 109 and five Messerschmitt Bf 110 fighters.

The Caudron fighter was also used by the Polish training squadron based in Bron near Lyon. Although the pilots managed to disperse several bombing raids, they did not score any kills; but they did not lose any aircraft either. By the end of June when France fell, only 53 production machines had been delivered (although the number varies, 98 is another common figure).

== Operators ==
Nazi Germany

- Luftwaffe 20 were confiscated by the Germans.

Finland

- Finnish Air Force had 6 C.714.

France

- French Air Force

Vichy France

- Vichy French Air Force

Poland

- Polish Air Force in Exile

== Surviving aircraft ==
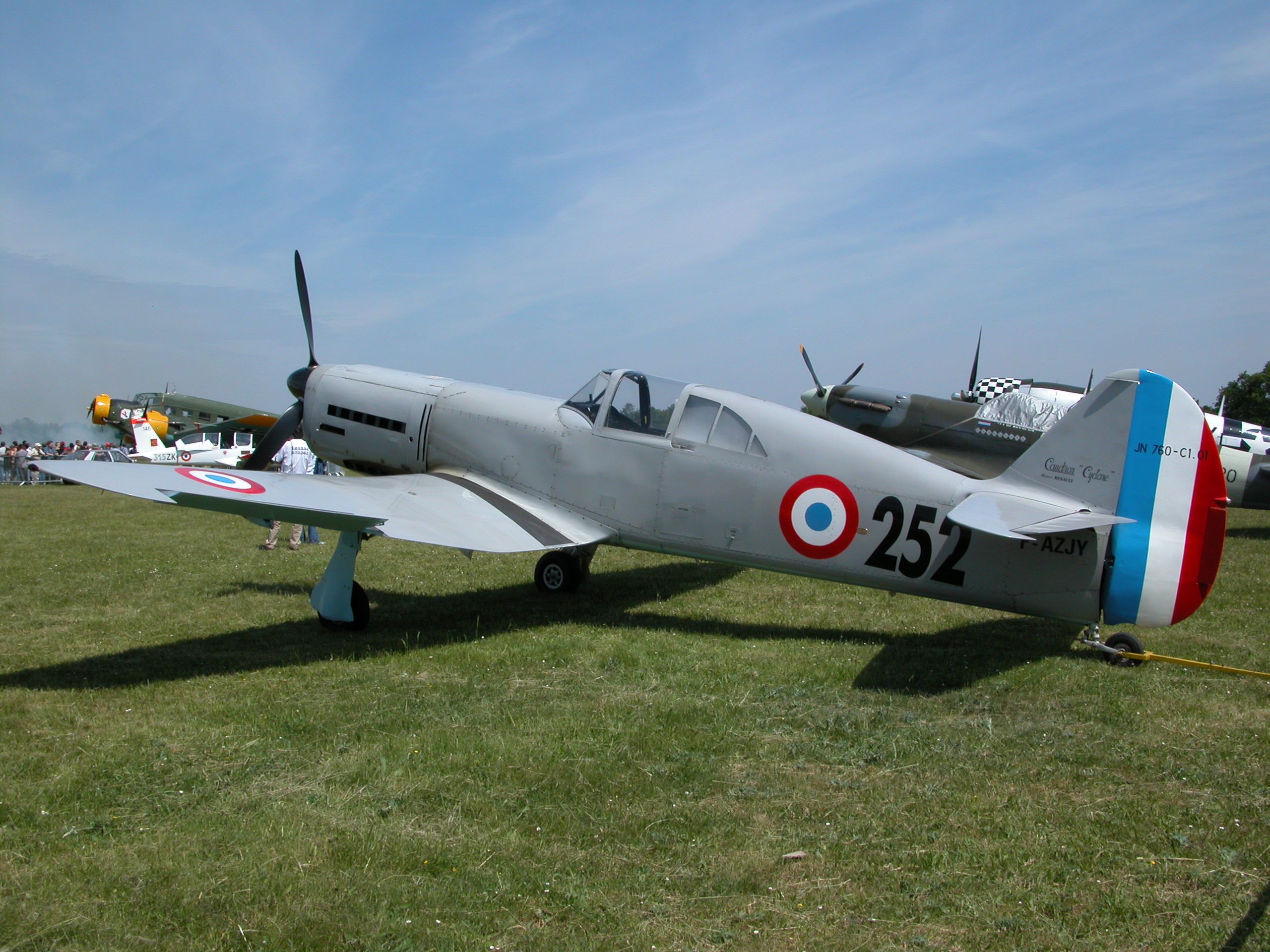
A replica of the Caudron C.714 at the La Ferté-Alais Air Show, 2004

One full CR.714 airframe as well as one additional fuselage were preserved in Finland. The fuselage was offered back to the Polish Aviation Museum where, as of 2026, it is on display.

== Specifications (Caudron C.714) ==

Data from The Complete Book of Fighters, Aviafrance : Caudron C.714

General characteristics

- Crew: 1
- Length: 8.63 m (28 ft 4 in)
- Wingspan: 8.97 m (29 ft 5 in)
- Height: 2.87 m (9 ft 5 in)
- Wing area: 12.5 m^{2} (135 sq ft)
- Empty weight: 1,395 kg (3,075 lb)
- Gross weight: 1,880 kg (4,145 lb)
- Powerplant: 1 × Renault 12R-03 V-12 air-cooled inverted piston engine, 370 kW (500 hp)
- Propellers: 3-bladed variable-pitch propeller

Performance

- Maximum speed: 455 km/h (283 mph, 246 kn) at 4,000 m (13,000 ft)

467 km/h (290 mph; 252 kn) at 5,000 m (16,000 ft)

- Range: 900 km (560 mi, 490 nmi) at 320 km/h (200 mph; 170 kn)
- Service ceiling: 9,100 m (29,900 ft)
- Time to altitude: 4,000 m (13,000 ft) in 9 minutes 40 seconds

Armament

- Guns: 4 × 7.5 mm (0.295 in) MAC 1934 machine guns

== See also ==
Aircraft of comparable role, configuration, and era

- Ambrosini SAI.207
- Ambrosini SAI.403 Dardo
- Bell XP-77
- Douglas XP-48
- Martin-Baker MB 2
- Miles M.20
- Roussel R-30
- Tucker XP-57
- VEF I-16

Related lists

- List of aircraft of the French Air Force during World War II
- List of fighter aircraft
- List of aircraft of World War II
