= Carplane GmbH Carplane =

German roadable aircraft

Carplane

General information
- Type: Roadable aircraft
- National origin: Germany
- Manufacturer: Carplane GmbH
- Status: Under development (2015)

History
- First flight: Pending

The Carplane GmbH Carplane is a German roadable aircraft under development by Carplane GmbH of Braunschweig. The aircraft is intended to be supplied complete and ready-to-fly.

The nearly complete prototype was first shown at the AERO Friedrichshafen show in 2015.

== Design and development ==
The design is intended to be certified as an EASA CS-VLA Very Light Aircraft under EASA airworthiness rules. It may also be put in the US light-sport aircraft category under a weight exemption.

The Carplane features a folding cantilever high-wing, two individual single-seat enclosed cockpits in side-by-side configuration in separate fuselages with individual bubble canopies. It has fixed quadracycle landing gear with 38.1 cm (15 in) wheels and a single engine in pusher configuration.

The twin fuselage design is intended to produce a vehicle that will drive as well as any compact car, while allowing space for the wings to fold and to store between the two fuselages, thus improving road aerodynamics and lower centre of gravity.

The aircraft is made from composites. Its 9.715 m (31.9 ft) span wing has an area of 10.72 m^{2} (115.4 sq ft) and can be extended in 20 seconds from road mode to aircraft mode. The standard engine used is a 130 hp (97 kW) LSA-Engines LSA850-130 petrol two-cylinder four-stroke 850 cc (52 cu in) powerplant.

Funding for the development is being provided by the European Union and the German state of Lower Saxony.

== Specifications ==
Data from Tacke and manufacturer

General characteristics

- Crew: one
- Capacity: one passenger
- Length: 7.453 m (24 ft 5 in)
- Wingspan: 9.715 m (31 ft 10 in) extended
- Height: 1.890 m (6 ft 2 in)
- Wing area: 10.72 m^{2} (115.4 sq ft)
- Empty weight: 498 kg (1,098 lb)
- Gross weight: 750 kg (1,653 lb)
- Fuel capacity: 100 litres (22 imp gal; 26 US gal)
- Powerplant: 1 × LSA-Engines LSA850-130 two-cylinder four stroke 850 cc (52 cu in) petrol engine, 97 kW (130 hp)
- Propellers: 4-bladed composite, 1.68 m (5 ft 6 in) diameter folding

Performance

- Maximum speed: 222 km/h (138 mph, 120 kn) in the air,
- Cruise speed: 200 km/h (120 mph, 110 kn)
- Stall speed: 66 km/h (41 mph, 36 kn)
- Range: 833 km (518 mi, 450 nmi)
- Service ceiling: 4,600 m (15,000 ft)
- Rate of climb: 5.84 m/s (1,150 ft/min)
