= Diemert Defender =

Counter-insurgency aircraft

The Diemert Defender was an emergency fighter project invented by Bob Diemert of Manitoba, Canada. It was designed in the Cold war as a mass produced counterinsurgency aircraft against the possibility of invading Soviet troops. The events surrounding the project were documented in a film.

== Development ==
The aircraft was designed by stunt pilot and WW2 warbird restorer Bob Diemert who previously worked on films such as Battle of Britain and was working on restoring a Mitsubishi A6M Zero that was salvaged from the jungles of the South Pacific. During the 1980s, he designed his own aircraft which could be mass produced and a cost effective point defence aircraft for the RCAF.

== See also ==
- Dive bomber
- Gunship
- Light Attack/Armed Reconnaissance (LAAR) Program
