= CANT Z.515 =

Z.515
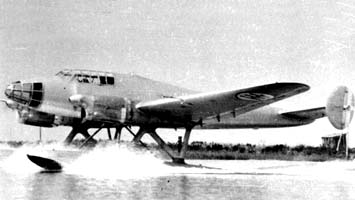

General information
- Type: Reconnaissance bomber
- National origin: Italy
- Manufacturer: Cantieri Aeronautici e Navali, Triestini (CANT)
- Designer: Filippo Zappata
- Number built: 11

History
- First flight: 1939

The CANT Z.515 was a twin engine monoplane floatplane designed and built for maritime reconnaissance in Italy at the start of World War II. It did not go into service.

== Design and development ==
The Z.515 (Z denoting a Zappata design) was the result of a requirement for a reconnaissance seaplane with light bombing capability. It was smaller and lighter than the established CANT Z.506 reconnaissance bomber, which was a three engine aircraft.

The Z.515 was a cantilever low wing monoplane with straight tapered wings of noticeable dihedral and rounded tips. There were flaps inboard of the ailerons. Twin 560 kW (750 hp) V-12 Isotta-Fraschini Delta engines were mounted well forward of the leading edge with their thrust line in the wing plane. The fairings behind engine mountings on the wing underside extended aft to near the trailing edge; the rear engine mounting also supported the forward attachment points for the rearward sloping, N-form struts to the two long, single stepped floats. The floats were laterally braced by inverted-V struts to the bottom of the fuselage. The Z.515's tailplane was mounted on top of the fuselage with greater dihedral than the wing and carrying endplate fins. The horizontal surfaces were straight tapered and the elevators, like the rudders had trim tabs. The vertical surfaces were almost elliptical, split roughly equally between fin and unbalanced rudder.

The lower nose of the Z.515 was completely glazed, with the long cockpit largely forward of the wing leading edge. There was a low dorsal machine gun turret at mid-chord and three further lower calibre machine guns. Up to 600 kg (1,320 lb) of bombs could be carried.

The CANT Z.515 first flew in 1939 but was not developed further. Some sources suggest a first flight date of 8 or 9 July 1940. The Regia Aeronautica approved the production of the Z.515 in 1941 with 64 aircraft ordered from CANT, and 50 from Aeronautica Sicula, a company in Palermo. Only ten were completed.

== Operators ==
Kingdom of Italy

- Regia Aeronautica

== Specifications ==
Data from Italian Civil and Military Aircraft 1930-1945

General characteristics

- Length: 16.04 m (52 ft 7 in)
- Wingspan: 22.50 m (73 ft 10 in)
- Height: 5.86 m (19 ft 3 in)
- Wing area: 63.10 m^{2} (679.2 sq ft)
- Gross weight: 8,482 kg (18,700 lb)
- Powerplant: 2 × Isotta Fraschini Delta III R.C.40 liquid cooled inverted V-12, 560 kW (750 hp) each
- Propellers: 3-bladed

Performance

- Maximum speed: 383 km/h (238 mph, 207 kn)
- Cruise speed: 310 km/h (190 mph, 170 kn)
- Range: 1,800 km (1,100 mi, 960 nmi)

Armament

- Guns: 1 × 12.7 mm (0.5 in) machine gun in rotating dorsal turret; 3 × 7.7 mm (0.303 in) hand controlled machine guns
- Bombs: 600 kg (1,323 lb)
