= The Defender (1989 film) =

- Theatrical poster
- Directed by: Stephen Low
- Written by: Stephen Low
- Produced by: Charles Konowal; Ches Yetman (Executive producer)
- Narrated by: Cedric Smith
- Cinematography: Charles Konowal
- Edited by: Alfonso Peccia
- Music by: Eldon Rathburn
- Production company: National Film Board of Canada
- Distributed by: National Film Board of Canada
- Release date: May 29, 1989
- Running time: 54 minutes, 54 seconds
- Country: Canada
- Language: English

The Defender is a 54-minute Canadian documentary film, made in 1988 by the National Film Board of Canada (NFB) and directed by Stephen Low. The film depicts the building of the Diemert Defender, an emergency fighter aircraft project by Bob Diemert, an eccentric Canadian aviation engineer. His dream of building the next Canadian strike fighter aircraft to challenge the might of the Soviet Union in the event of invasion was dependent on selling a restored warbird. (Note: The Defender was built for a reputed $25,000.00.)

== Synopsis ==
At Friendship Field, Carman, Manitoba, aircraft restorer and self-taught engineer Bob Diemert and his friend Chris Ball are working on an unusual project which had its origins in the late 1970s. Taking shape in one of the airfield hangars is a new type of close air support or COIN aircraft designed to take on Soviet Union tanks. Christened the "Defender", the unusual design is a throwback to the heavily armoured Junkers Ju 87 Stuka and Ilyushin Il-2 Sturmovik close air support aircraft of the Second World War.

In order to raise the funds for the Defender, Diemert began to restore one of the rare Japanese aircraft he retrieved from Balalae, Solomon Islands, a Mitsubishi A6M2 Zero fighter, one of very few of the type still in existence. (Note: The fighters on Balalae from the 201st Navy Air Corps were off-loaded from the Japanese aircraft carrier Zuikaku after taking part in the attack on Pearl Harbor.) In the past, he had made his mark in the ranks of aircraft restoration when he rebuilt a Hawker Hurricane XII and flew it in the 1969 Battle of Britain film. The sale of the Zero to the Confederate Air Force in Texas has to await the painstaking restoration of the Japanese fighter aircraft. As it is readied for a test flight, Diemert runs afoul of Canadian aviation authorities, who refuse to allow him to fly the aircraft. Trucking the restored aircraft to Midland, Texas is the solution and after successful test flights, the Zero is passed over to its new American owners.

Completing the Defender becomes the sole preoccupation of Diemert and his friend. Trying to ensure that the aerodynamics are properly established leads to a curious use of a bathroom scale mounted on the back of a pickup truck, an example of the unorthodox engineering that is employed in the project. Another example of Diemert's out-of-the-box thinking comes when his children ask him to build a swimming pool. His wife comes back from work to find a swimming pool in the living room, complete with wall-to-wall carpeting.

When the Defender finally emerges from its hangar, Diemert prepares for the all-important maiden flight, but things do not go as planned.

== Production ==
Director Stephen Low committed himself to the film project from 1982, following the story of the Diemert projects as they continually changed. The result was a six-year-long period of acquiring footage, along with producer/cameraman Charles Kenowal, at a variety of locations including Diemert's home base of Carman, Winnipeg's Transport Canada offices and Texas. During the production, Low had the full cooperation of Diemert, his friends and his family.

== Reception ==
The Defender was received "charitably" by audiences and critics alike. After a number of premieres and repeated broadcast showings beginning on March 22, 1990, the film became a cult hit for aviation enthusiasts. Montreal-based writer and photographer and NFB writer Carolyne Weldon characterized The Defender as "this doc is part of our deliciously nutty Outside the Box film channel, whose enticing tagline reads 'Experimental films, humorous films and films that make you go "Wha…?'"

The Defender has won awards at numerous festivals. At the 1989 Yorkton Film Festival, the film won "Best Production", "Superchannel Award" and the Golden Sheaf "Best Director" Award for Stephen Low. The film was also nominated for two Genie Awards in 1990 (Best Direction, Documentary and Best Writing, Documentary categories).
