= LSA-Engines LSA850 =

LSA850
- Type: Aircraft engine
- National origin: Germany
- Manufacturer: LSA-Engines GmbH

The LSA-Engines LSA850 is a family of German aircraft engines, produced by LSA-Engines of Berlin for use in light-sport aircraft.

== Design and development ==
Introduced in 2015, the LSA850 series is based upon the Weber Motor MPE 850.

The LSA850 is a twin-cylinder four-stroke two-stroke, in-line, 850 cc (51.9 cu in) displacement, liquid-cooled, gasoline engine design, with a helical gear mechanical gearbox reduction drive with a reduction ratio of 3.33:1. It employs electronic ignition and has a compression ratio of 9:1.

== Variants ==
LSA850-105
Model with a power output of 105 hp (78 kW) at 7250 rpm
LSA850-130
Model with a power output of 130 hp (97 kW) at 7500 rpm

== Applications ==
- Carplane GmbH Carplane

== Specifications (LSA850-130) ==
Data from Tacke

=== General characteristics ===
- Type: Twin-cylinder, four-stroke aircraft engine
- Bore: 89 mm (3.5 in)
- Stroke: 68 mm (2.7 in)
- Displacement: 850 cc (51.9 cu in)
- Length: 562 mm (22.1 in)
- Width: 536 mm (21.1 in)
- Height: 482 mm (19.0 in)
- Dry weight: 85 kg (187.4 lb)

=== Components ===
- Fuel type: gasoline
- Cooling system: liquid
- Reduction gear: helical gear mechanical gearbox

=== Performance ===
- Power output: 130 hp (97 kW)

== See also ==
Related lists

- List of aircraft engines
