= Isotta Fraschini Delta =

12-cylinder inverted-V aircraft engine

Delta
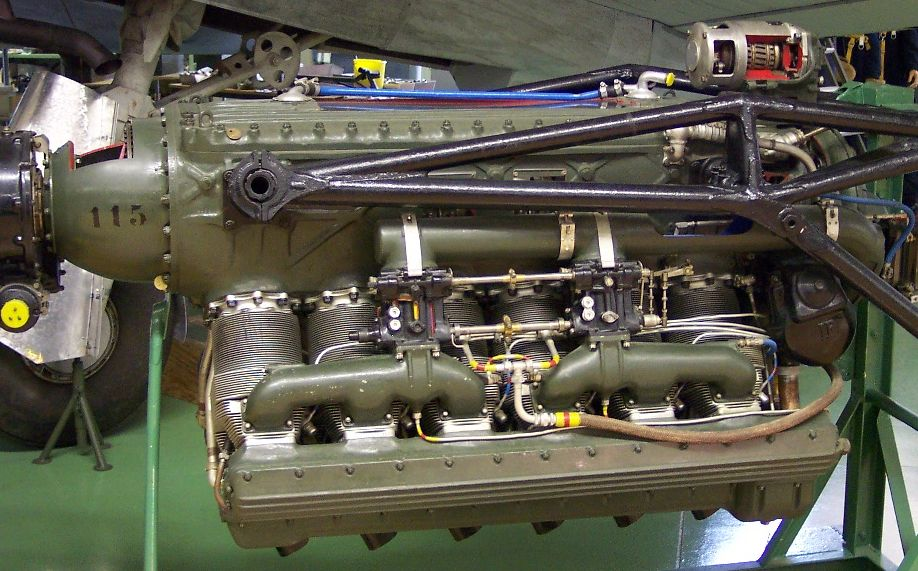
- Preserved Delta RC131
- Type: V12 piston engine
- Manufacturer: Isotta Fraschini
- First run: 1927
- Number built: c. 3,300

The Delta was a 12-cylinder inverted-V aircraft engine built by Isotta Fraschini prior to and during World War II.

== Design and development ==
The Delta is a fairly rare example of a large air-cooled inline engine, which normally have cooling problems with the rearmost cylinders. It produced about 750 hp in common versions, although others were rated up to 900 hp. The Delta was not widely used, although it could be found on a number of production aircraft and some advanced prototypes.

The engine included a number of otherwise advanced features. For instance, the valves were powered by dual overhead cams driven by power shafts at the rear of the engine. Exhaust ports were arranged to exit toward the middle of the engine, one cylinder bank being the mirror of the other, allowing the piping to be ganged below the engine nacelle.

== Variants ==
Delta R.C.20/55 ID-IS
Delta R.C.21/60
Delta R.C.35
Delta R.C.35 I
Delta R.C.35 IS
Delta R.C.40 IS
Delta R.C.40 ID-IS
Delta R.C.48
Delta III R.C.40
Delta IV R.C.17/50

== Applications ==
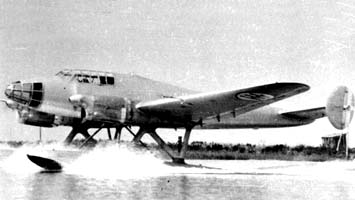
Delta-powered CANT Z.515 floatplane

- Ambrosini SAI.107
- Ambrosini SAI.207 prototype
- Ambrosini SAI.403 prototype
- CANT Z.515
- Caproni Ca.313
- Caproni Ca.314
- Caproni Ca.331
- Caudron C.714 (C.760) prototype
- Henschel Hs 129 prototype
- Reggiane Re.2001 prototype
- Savoia-Marchetti SM.86

== Specifications (Delta RC35-IDS) ==
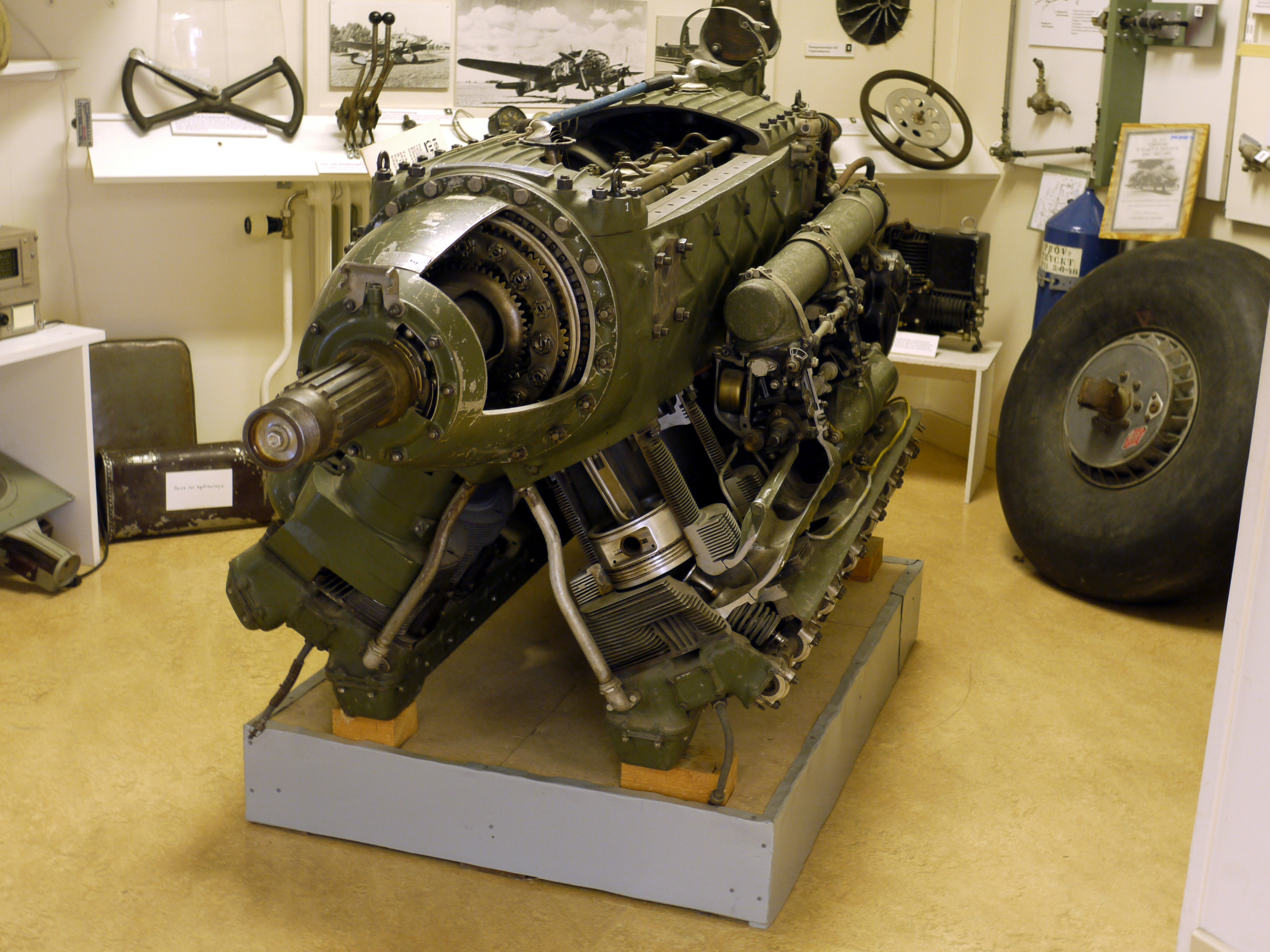
Frontal view of sectioned engine

Data from Aircraft engines of the World.

=== General characteristics ===
- Type: 12-cylinder air-cooled 60 degree inverted vee
- Bore: 132 mm (5.2 in)
- Stroke: 160 mm (6.3 in)
- Displacement: 26.7 L (1,630 cu in)
- Length: 2,000 mm (78.7 in)
- Width: 840 mm (33.1 in)
- Height: 883 mm (34.8 in)
- Dry weight: 510 kg (1,124 lb)

=== Components ===
- Valvetrain: Two poppet valves per cylinder, sodium cooled exhaust valves, double overhead camshafts
- Supercharger: Single-stage, single-speed centrifugal type supercharger, gear ratio 9.8:1
- Fuel system: Four Isotta Fraschini downdraft carburetors
- Fuel type: 80/87 octane petrol (aviation gasoline)
- Oil system: Dry sump, double scavenge pump, single pressure pump
- Cooling system: Air-cooled
- Reduction gear: Ratio 0.64:1

=== Performance ===
- Power output:

- 570 kW (770 hp) at 2,600 rpm (take off)
- 560 kW (750 hp) at 2,600 rpm at 4,000 m (13,000 ft)

- Specific power: 21.5 kW/L (0.47 hp/in³)
- Compression ratio: 6.4:1
- Specific fuel consumption: 270 grams/hp*hour maximum, 250 grams/hp*hour cruise (70%)
- Power-to-weight ratio: 1.1 kW/kg (0.68 hp/lb)

== See also ==
Comparable engines

- Allison V-1710
- Hispano-Suiza 12X
- Rolls-Royce Merlin

Related lists

- List of aircraft engines
