= Miles M.20 =

World War II prototype aircraft model

M.20
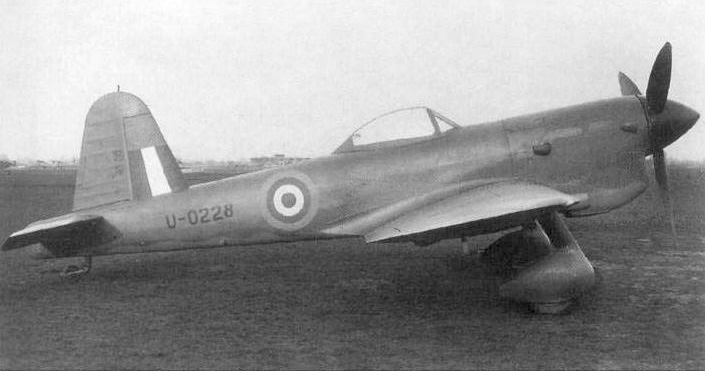
- Second prototype of the Miles M.20

General information
- Type: Lightweight fighter
- Manufacturer: Miles Aircraft
- Designer: Walter G. Capley
- Primary users: Royal Air Force (trials only) Fleet Air Arm (trials only)
- Number built: 2 prototypes

History
- First flight: 15 September 1940
- Developed from: Miles Master

The Miles M.20 was a Second World War British fighter developed by Miles Aircraft in 1940. It was designed as a simple and quick-to-build "emergency fighter" alternative to the Royal Air Force's Spitfires and Hurricanes should their production become disrupted by bombing expected in the anticipated German invasion of the United Kingdom. Due to the subsequent shifting of the German bombing effort after the Battle of Britain towards British cities in what became known as The Blitz, together with the dispersal of British fighter manufacturing, the Luftwaffe's bombing of the original Spitfire and Hurricane factories did not seriously affect production, and so the M.20 proved unnecessary and the design was not pursued.

== Design and development ==
At the outbreak of the Second World War in September 1939, Miles Aircraft began work on a single-engined fighter to supplement the RAF's Spitfires and Hurricanes. A wooden mock-up of the design, the M.20/1, was inspected by Sir Kingsley Wood, the Secretary of State for Air, but no orders followed. Following the outbreak of the Battle of Britain in July 1940, the Royal Air Force was faced with a potential shortage of fighters. To meet the Luftwaffe threat, the Air Ministry commissioned Miles to design a simple easy-to-build fighter to specification F.19/40. This became the Miles M.20/2. Nine weeks and two days later the first prototype flew.

To reduce production time the M.20 employed all-wood construction and used many parts from the earlier Miles Master trainer, lacked hydraulics, and had spatted fixed landing gear. The fixed undercarriage freed space and payload sufficient for twelve .303 Browning machine guns and 5000 rounds, and 154 Imperial gallons (700 litres) of fuel (double the range and ammunition capacity of the Hawker Hurricane and Supermarine Spitfire). The M.20 was fitted with a bubble canopy for improved 360-degree vision.

In line with a design philosophy emphasising simplicity, speed and re-using available components, the engine was a Rolls-Royce Merlin XX "power egg" identical to those used on Merlin-powered Avro Lancasters and Bristol Beaufighters. This conferred flight performance that fell between those of Britain's two frontline fighters.

== Testing and evaluation ==
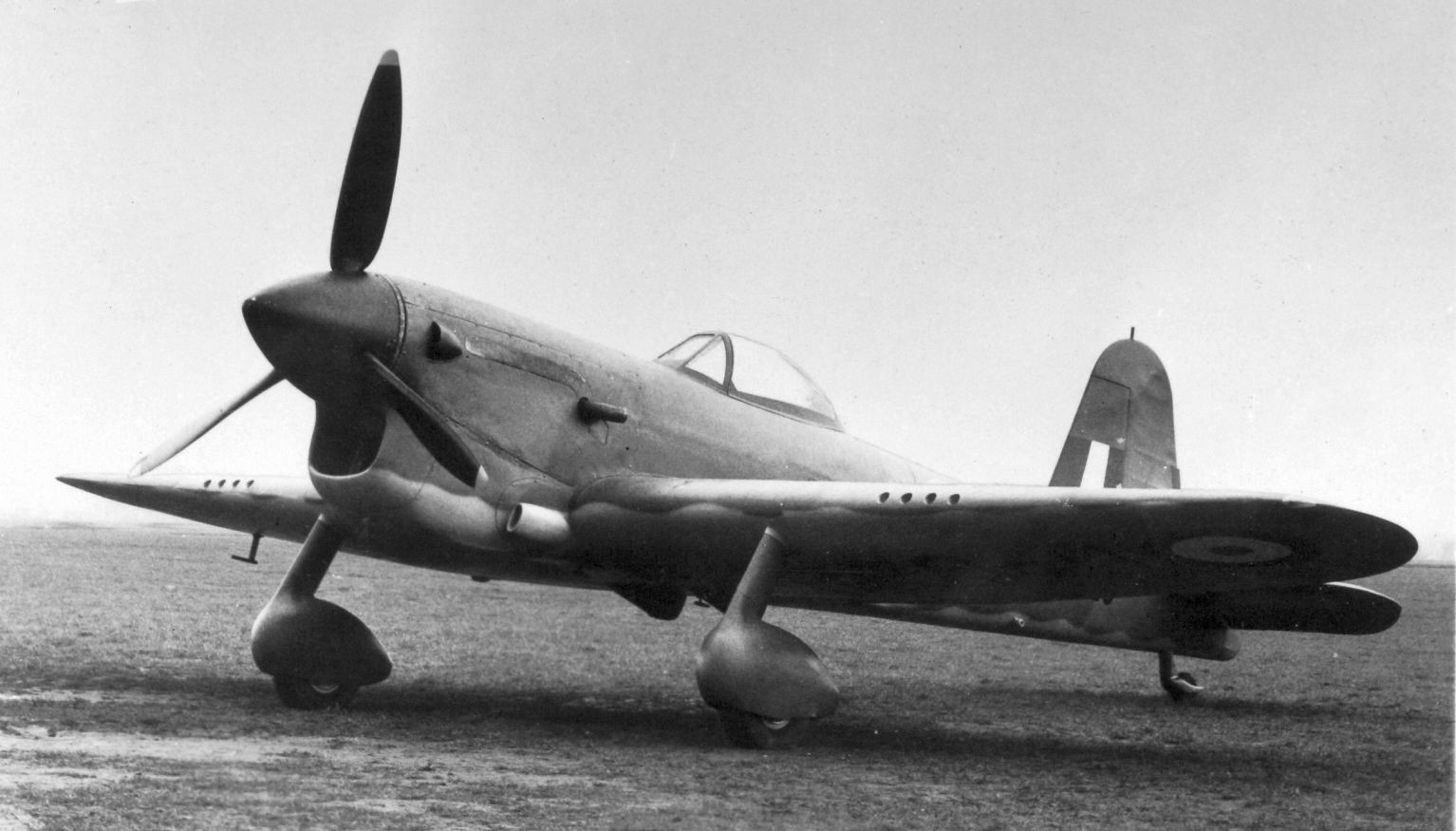

The first prototype first flew on 15 September 1940, and was tested at the A & AEE under the military serial number AX834 against Specification F.19/40. Armed with eight .303 Browning machine guns like the Hurricane, the M.20 prototype was faster than the Hurricane but slower than Spitfire types then in production, but carried more ammunition and had greater range than either. Once the Luftwaffe had been defeated over Britain, the need for the M.20 vanished and the design was abandoned without entering production. The first prototype was scrapped at Woodley.

A second prototype, U-0228 (later DR616) was built to Specification N.1/41 for a Fleet Air Arm shipboard fighter, equipped with an arrestor hook and catapult launch points. It first flew on 8 April 1941. This variant could be launched by catapult aircraft merchant ships which lacked flight decks so the aircraft were to be ditched after their mission, and to facilitate this the undercarriage could be jettisoned. However, obsolete Hurricanes were modified to fill this role, which rendered a shipboard variant of the M.20 unnecessary. Consequently, this prototype was also scrapped.

Test pilot Eric Brown flew this aircraft in January 1942. He reported that "although surprisingly nippy in performance, could not match the Martlet, Hurricane, or Spitfire in manoeuvrability". It lacked also the excellent deck landing characteristics of the Martlet.

Accounts compare the M.20's performance with that of Battle of Britain aircraft. The M.20 (345 mph (555 km/h) at 20,400 ft (6,200 m)) was powered by a Rolls-Royce Merlin XX with a two‑speed supercharger. A Hurricane IIB with the same engine did 342 mph (550 km/h) at 22,000 ft (6,700 m). A Spitfire Mk.VC, powered by a similar Merlin 45 did 374 mph (602 km/h) at 13,000 ft (4,000 m). The Spitfire was armed with two 20 mm (0.79 in) cannons and four .303 in (7.7 mm) machine guns. The other two aircraft were armed with eight .303 in (7.7 mm) machine guns.

== Specifications (M.20/4) ==
Miles M.20 3 view drawing

Data from The British Fighter since 1912, Miles Aircraft since 1925

General characteristics

- Crew: 1
- Length: 30 ft 1 in (9.17 m)
- Wingspan: 34 ft 7 in (10.54 m)
- Height: 12 ft 6 in (3.81 m)
- Wing area: 234 sq ft (21.7 m^{2})
- Airfoil: root: NACA 23021; tip: NACA 23009
- Empty weight: 5,870 lb (2,663 kg)
- Max takeoff weight: 7,758 lb (3,519 kg)
- Fuel capacity: 154 imp gal (185 US gal; 700 L) fuel; 8.5 imp gal (10 US gal; 39 L)
- Powerplant: 1 × Rolls-Royce Merlin XX V-12 liquid-cooled piston engine, 1,260 hp (940 kW) at 3,000 rpm
- Propellers: 3-bladed Rotol constant-speed propeller

Performance

- Maximum speed: 333 mph (536 km/h, 289 kn) at 20,600 ft (6,300 m) combat load

350 mph (560 km/h) clean at 20,600 ft (6,300 m)

- Stall speed: 80 mph (130 km/h, 70 kn) flaps down

101 mph (163 km/h) flaps up

- Range: 550 mi (890 km, 480 nmi) / 2 hour duration - normal

870 mi (756 nmi; 1,400 km) / 5 hours 12 minutes duration - absolute maximum

- Endurance: 5 hours 12 minutes at 9,000 ft (2,700 m)
- Service ceiling: 31,400 ft (9,600 m)
- Absolute ceiling: 35,500 ft (10,800 m)
- Rate of climb: 3,200 ft/min (16 m/s)
- Time to altitude: 20,000 ft (6,100 m) in 9 minutes 36 seconds
- Wing loading: 33.2 lb/sq ft (162 kg/m^{2})
- Take-off run: 810 ft (250 m) with 30° flap
- Take-off distance to 50 ft (15 m): 1,350 ft (410 m) with 30° flap

Armament

- Guns: 8 × .303 in (7.7 mm) Browning machine guns

== See also ==
Related development

- Miles Master

Aircraft of comparable role, configuration, and era

- Bell XP-77
- Caudron C.714
- Douglas XP-48
- Martin-Baker M.B.2
- Tucker XP-57

Related lists

- List of fighter aircraft
- List of aircraft of World War II
