= Tucker XP-57 =

Canceled fighter aircraft project

Tucker XP-57 "Peashooter"
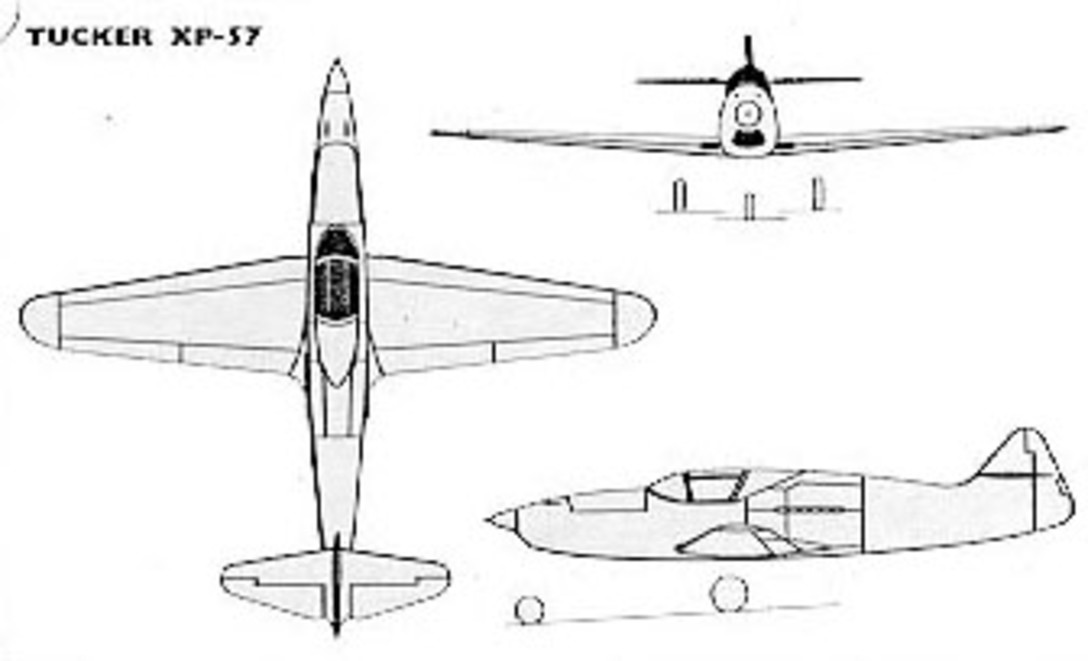

General information
- Type: Fighter
- Manufacturer: Tucker Aviation Corporation
- Designer: Preston Tucker
- Status: Cancelled
- Number built: None

Tucker XP-57 was the designation of a lightweight fighter which was proposed to the United States Army Air Corps (USAAC) in 1940. Nicknamed the "Peashooter", it was developed by the Tucker Aviation Corporation under Preston Tucker, who later became famous for the Tucker '48 Sedan.

To minimize weight, the aircraft was to have a steel tubular frame with aluminum skin and plywood wings. The inline-8 engine, designed by Harry Miller of Indy 500 racing fame, was to sit behind the pilot in a configuration similar to the P-39 Airacobra. The USAAC ordered an XP-57 prototype. When design was delayed due to financial problems in the company, the contract was allowed to lapse. No production aircraft was built because the USAAC was moving towards larger fighters and had lost interest in the project.

== Prototype specifications (XP-57) ==
General characteristics

- Crew: 1
- Length: 26 ft 7 in (8.1 m)
- Wingspan: 28 ft 5 in (8.7 m)
- Height: 8 ft 0 in (2.4 m)
- Wing area: 120 sq ft (11.1 m^{2})
- Empty weight: 3,400 lb (1,542 kg)
- Powerplant: 1 × Miller L-510 8-cylinder inline mounted at center behind pilot. Double propellers. , 720 hp (537 kW)

Performance

- Maximum speed: 308 mph (495 km/h, 268 kn)
- Range: 600 mi (960 km, 520 nmi)

Armament

- 3x 0.50 cal (12.7 mm) machine guns
- 1x 0.50 cal machine gun and 2× 20 mm cannon

== See also ==
Aircraft of comparable role, configuration, and era

- Bell XP-77
- Caudron C.714
- Douglas XP-48
- Miles M.20
