= Bubble canopy =

Type of aircraft canopy

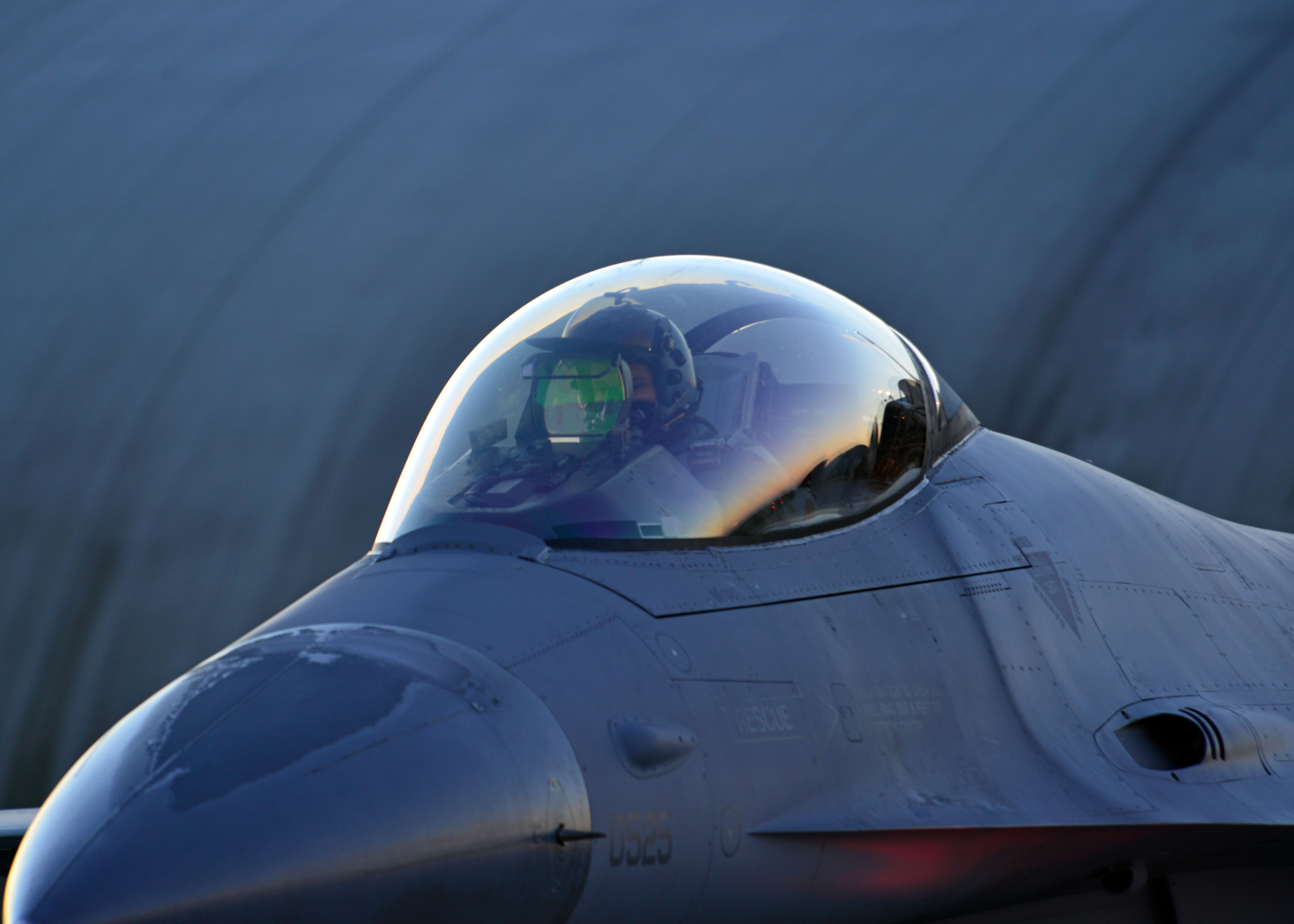
F-16 Fighting Falcon showing a bubble canopy

A bubble canopy is an aircraft canopy constructed without bracing, for the purpose of providing a wider unobstructed field of view to the pilot, often providing 360° all-round visibility.

The designs of bubble canopies can vary drastically; some, such as on later versions of the F4U Corsair, are built into the upper rear fuselage, while others, like the canopy of the P-51D Mustang and most modern combat aircraft, are built flush with the fuselage, providing unobstructed rear visibility. Although experimented with as early as the First World War, the bubble canopy was brought into widespread use during the Second World War, being used by a number of American, British, and Japanese aircraft, commonly fighters.

During the postwar era, the bubble canopy became a common feature of jet-powered fighter aircraft. Outside of combat aircraft, such canopies have also been adopted by several helicopters and general aviation aircraft, often for roles that benefit from a high level of exterior visibility, such as aerial reconnaissance.

== History ==
The bubble canopy had been in use well before Second World War; a number of experimental bubble canopy designs has been tested during the First World War. British aircraft designers developed the Malcolm hood, a bulged canopy, that was first adopted on the Supermarine Spitfire and subsequently other aircraft. The British Miles M.20 was amongst the first aircraft designs to feature a true one-piece sliding bubble canopy. Although that aircraft never went into production, the concept of the bubble canopy was later used on other British aircraft, such as the Hawker Typhoon and Tempest.

Subsequently, Malcolm hood-style canopies were fitted to the North American P-51 Mustang and Republic P-47 Thunderbolt, amongst other aircraft. A well-framed version of an all-around vision canopy was also used on the Imperial Japanese Navy Air Service Mitsubishi A6M Zero Japanese naval fighter. Different designs, with much less framing than the "Zero" hood, were used on the Imperial Japanese Army Air Service Nakajima Ki-43 Oscar and Nakajima Ki-84 Frank land-based fighter aircraft.

The Bell 47 helicopter was the first production helicopter certified for civilian use in the United States, and in its Model 47D version, pioneered the "soap bubble"-style canopy for light helicopters – as named by its designer, Arthur M. Young – that it and the 47G model were to become famous for. Following after the Bell 47, various other rotorcraft have used bubble canopies, including the Robinson R44, Schweizer S333, and the Mil Mi-24, the later versions of the latter possessing a distinctive tandem cockpit with a "double bubble" canopy that replaced its original angular greenhouse-style cockpit arrangement.

Numerous jet-powered fighter aircraft of the postwar era adopted bubble canopies. One of the more prominent external differences between the ground-attack orientated Hawker Siddeley Harrier and the later British Aerospace Sea Harrier, a navalised fighter derivative of the former, was the adoption of an elevated cockpit within a bubble canopy, granting superior exterior visibility to the pilot. The General Dynamics F-16 Fighting Falcon also adopted a frameless bubble canopy in conjunction with a raised and reclined seat that granted unobstructed forward and upward vision. The canopy of the F-16 comprises a single piece of bird-proof polycarbonate; it lacks the forward bow frame found on many fighters, which is an obstruction to a pilot's forward vision. Bubble canopies were also incorporated into the Lockheed Martin F-22 Raptor and the Eurofighter Typhoon, both being fighters oriented towards the aerial supremacy role.

Specialised aerial reconnaissance aircraft have also made use of bubble canopies. The Edgley Optica incorporates an unorthodox fully glazed forward cabin, intended to provide a high level of exterior vision to its crew; the aircraft has a distinctive appearance due to this cabin, often being referred to as the "bug-eye". The bubble canopy has also been adopted within the general aviation sector; the Diamond DA42 is one such aircraft which incorporates such a canopy in some guises, typically intended for reconnaissance work. Another general aviation aircraft, the Grob G 120, also features a relatively wide bubble-style canopy. Numerous aircraft within the general aviation category feature such canopies.

== Purpose ==
The purpose of a bubble canopy is to give a pilot a much wider field-of-view than flush, framed "greenhouse" canopies used on early World War II aircraft, such as those seen on early models of the F4U, P-51, the Soviet Yak-1 and earlier, "razorback" P-47 fighters, all with dorsal "turtledecks" integral to their fuselage lines, which left a blind spot behind the pilot that enemy pilots could take advantage of to sneak up on an aircraft.

The open-cockpit design combat aircraft of World War I had narrow fuselages, which often were not tall enough to block visibility to the rear, especially with seating positions that generally elevated the pilot's head well above the cockpit's edges. As planes became larger, heavier and faster, designs had to be made stronger, which often meant a taller rear fuselage, but designers tried to maintain the narrow fuselage for visibility.

However, as speed continued to increase, it became necessary to enclose cockpits – and this, in turn, streamlined aircraft so that they were faster still. Increased "g-loading" during maneuvers forced pilots to wear tight, restrictive shoulder harnesses, and armor plating began to be installed to protect pilots from projectiles coming from behind. These changes denied a pilot the ability to twist around and look directly behind (known as "checking six," or looking at the "six o'clock" position directly to the rear). Mirrors offered some help, but had a narrow field of view.

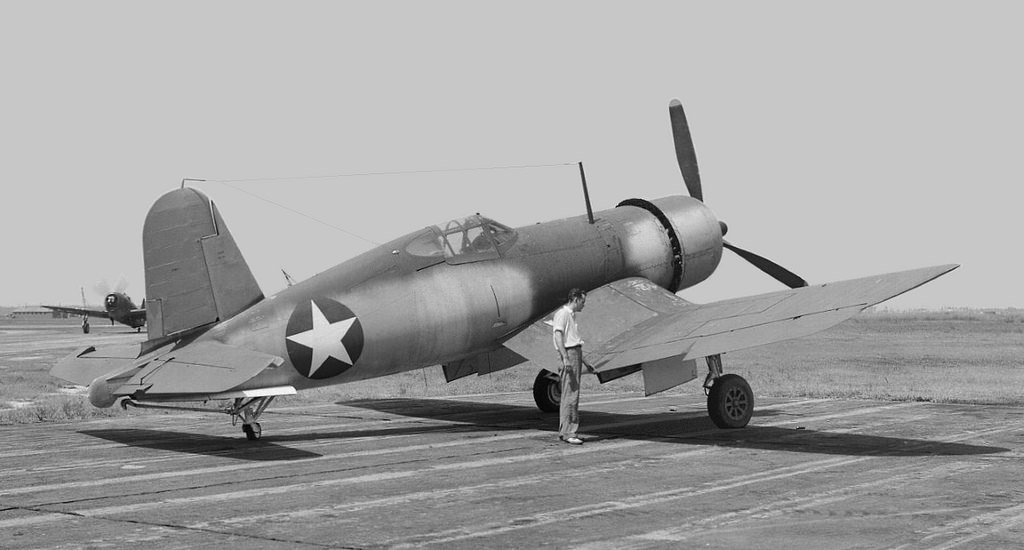
An early F4U-1 Corsair, with the recessed rear vision panels behind the sliding "greenhouse"-framed canopy.

Prior to bubble canopies, some aircraft, such as the P-40 Warhawk, featured a hybrid flush canopy design, combining a narrow rear fuselage with a glass enclosure conforming to the shape of a full-width fuselage - these often had a pair of recessed panels (one per side, behind the openable canopy) in the dorsal "turtledeck" structure, faired-in with framed glazing that was flush to the fuselage surface. This provided increased visibility while still allowing a pilot to keep the canopy closed for greater performance. Examples of such "recessed" rear vision designs were the "greenhouse"-canopied original F4U-1 Corsair as well as the P-40. The bulged Malcolm hood, used for the Spitfire, F4U Corsair, and P-51B and -C Mustangs was another hybrid. While not offering as much visibility to the rear as the P-40 enjoyed, it allowed a pilot more visibility than a flush canopy would.

== Examples ==
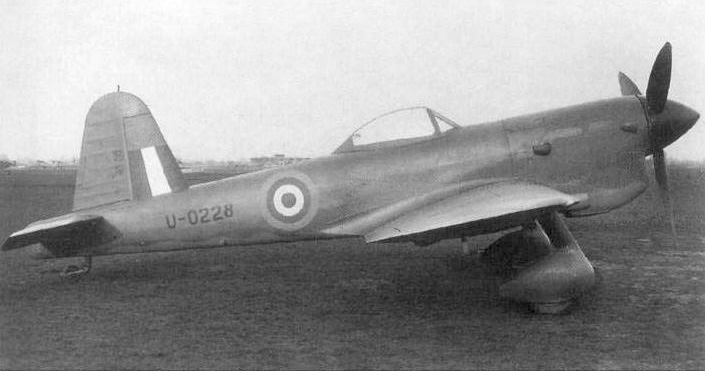
Miles M.20 showing the one-piece frame-less bubble canopy, the whole of which slides rearwards to open

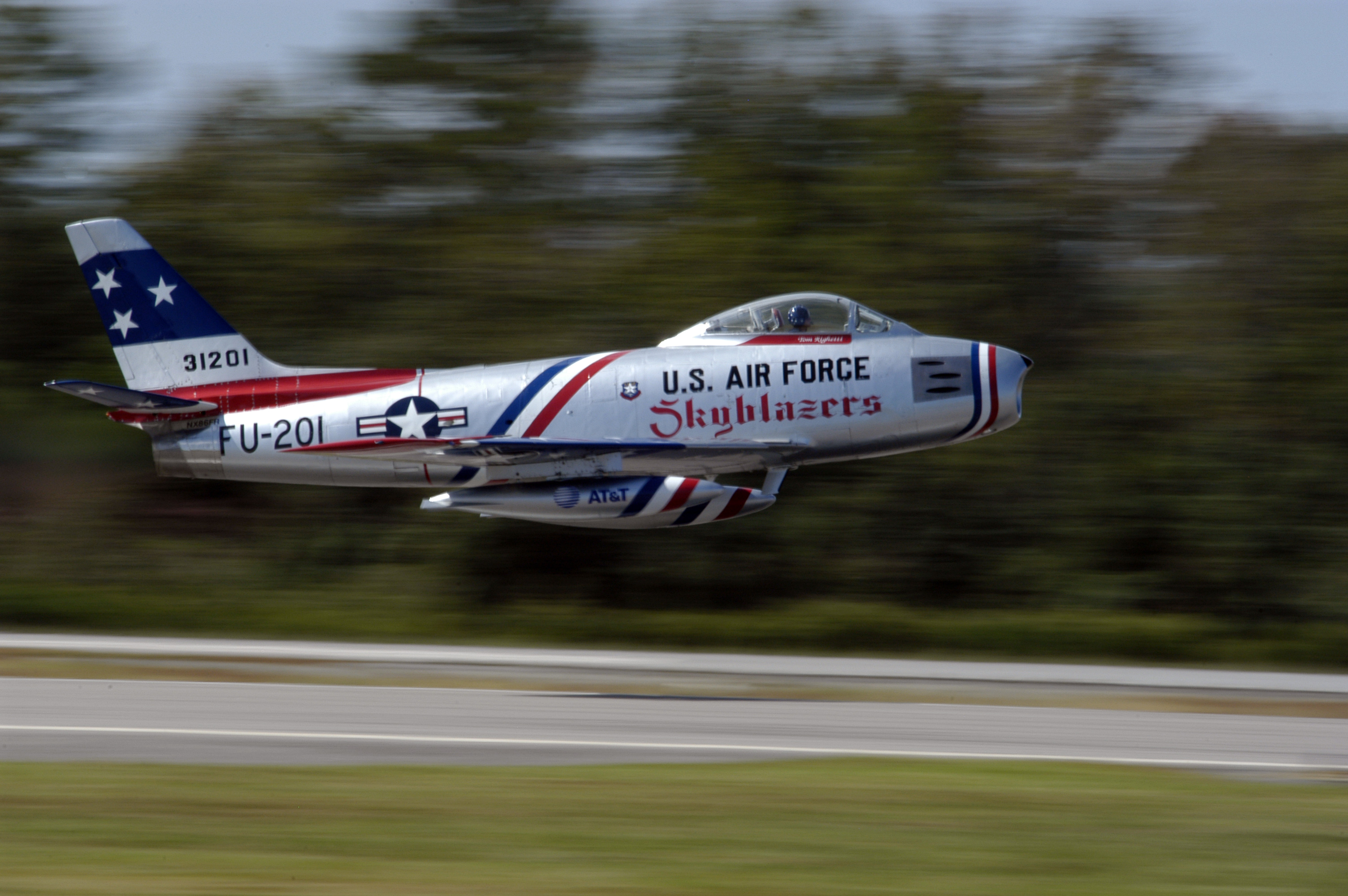
F-86 Sabre

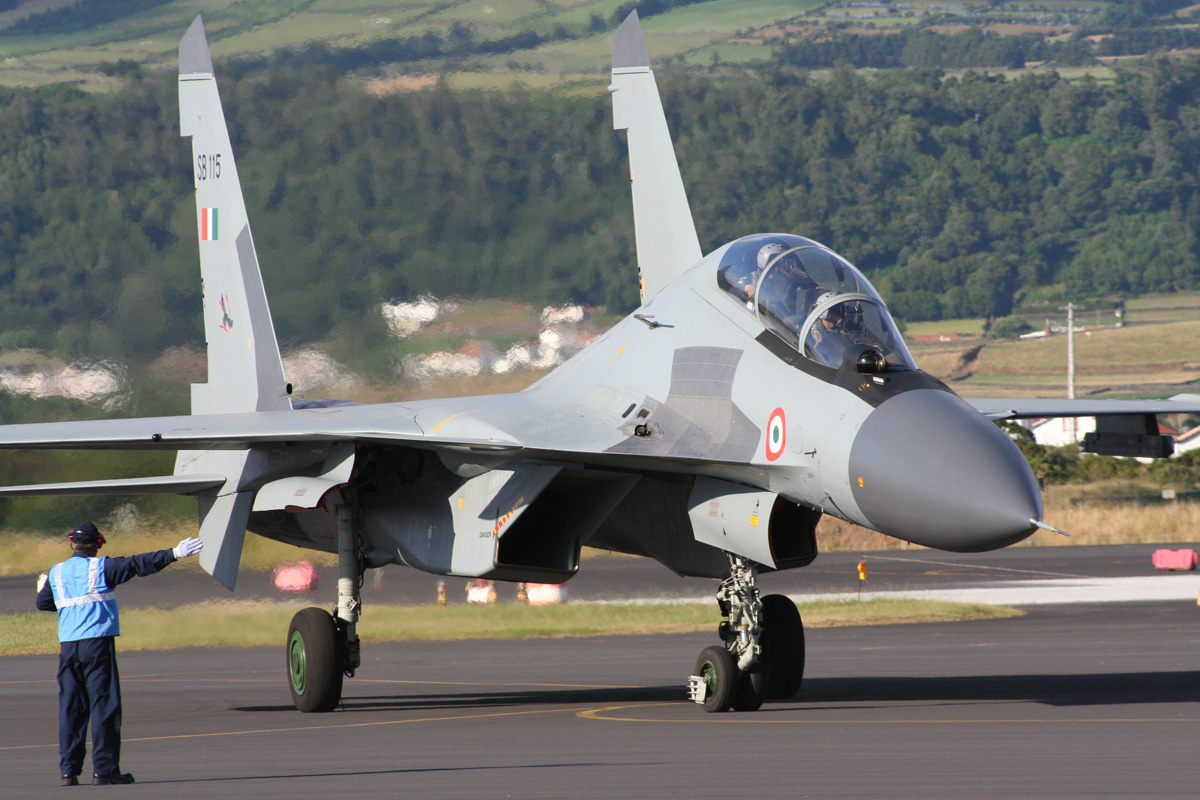
View of a Su-30 MKI canopy

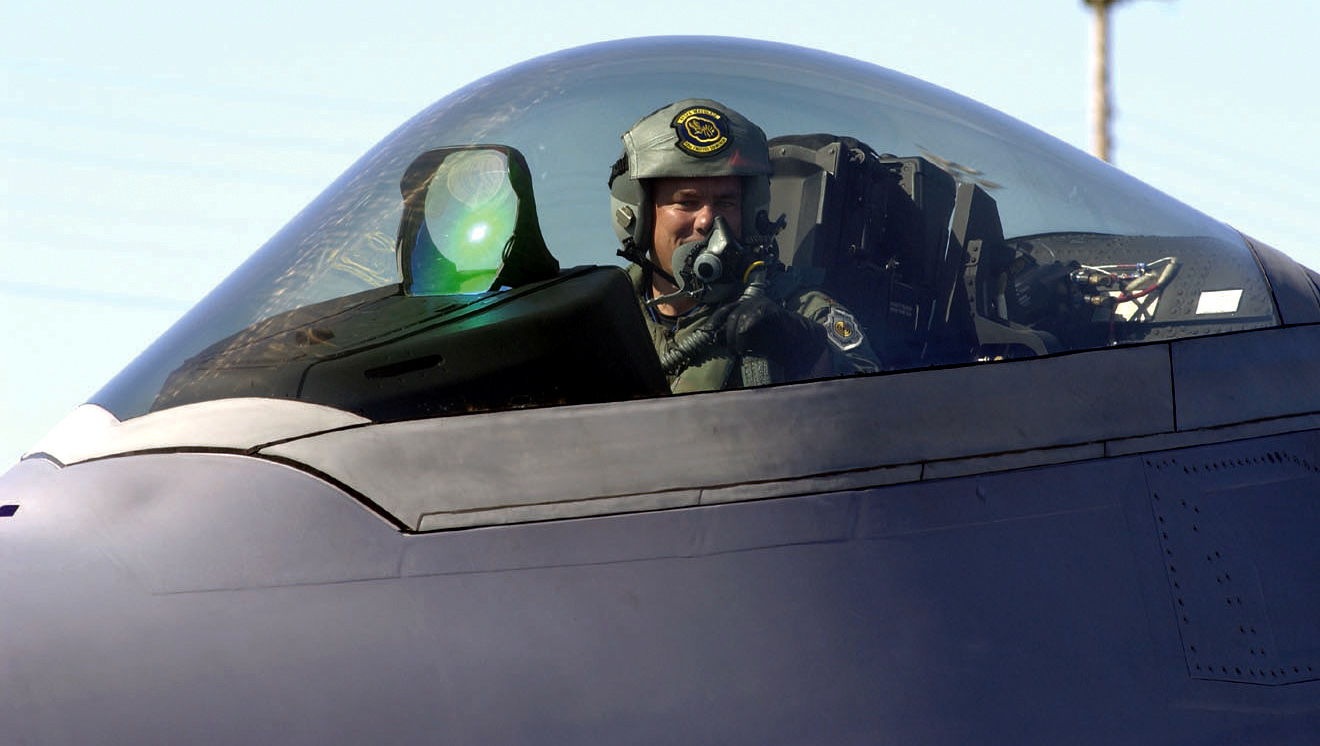
F-22 showing the frameless canopy and the 360° view for the pilot

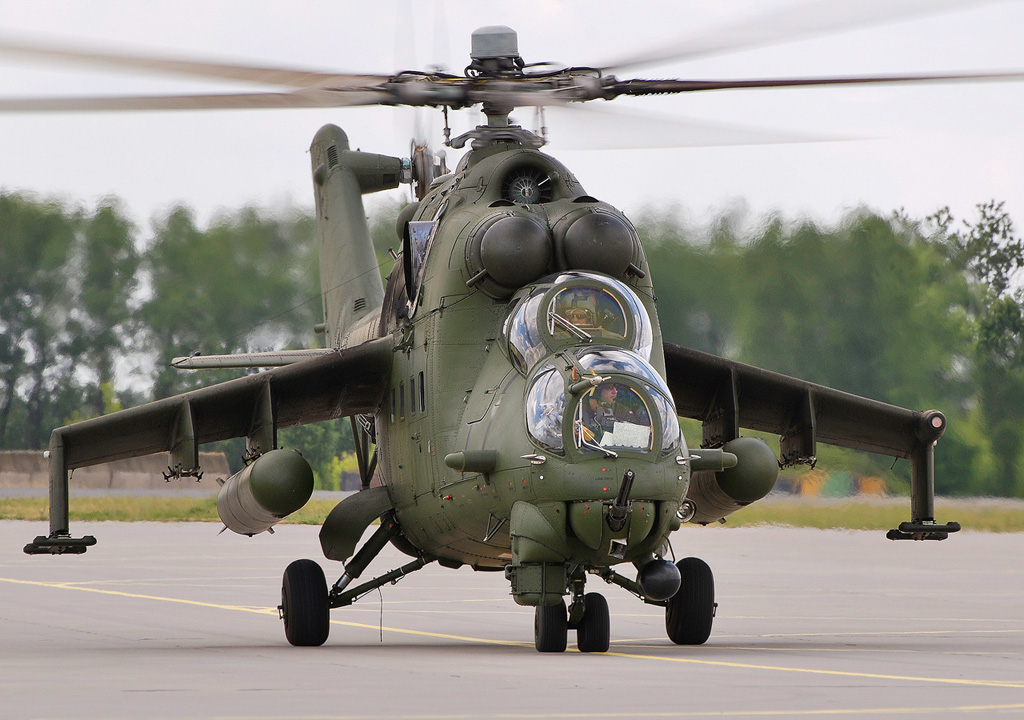
The twin bubble canopies of the Mil Mi-24 Hind helicopter

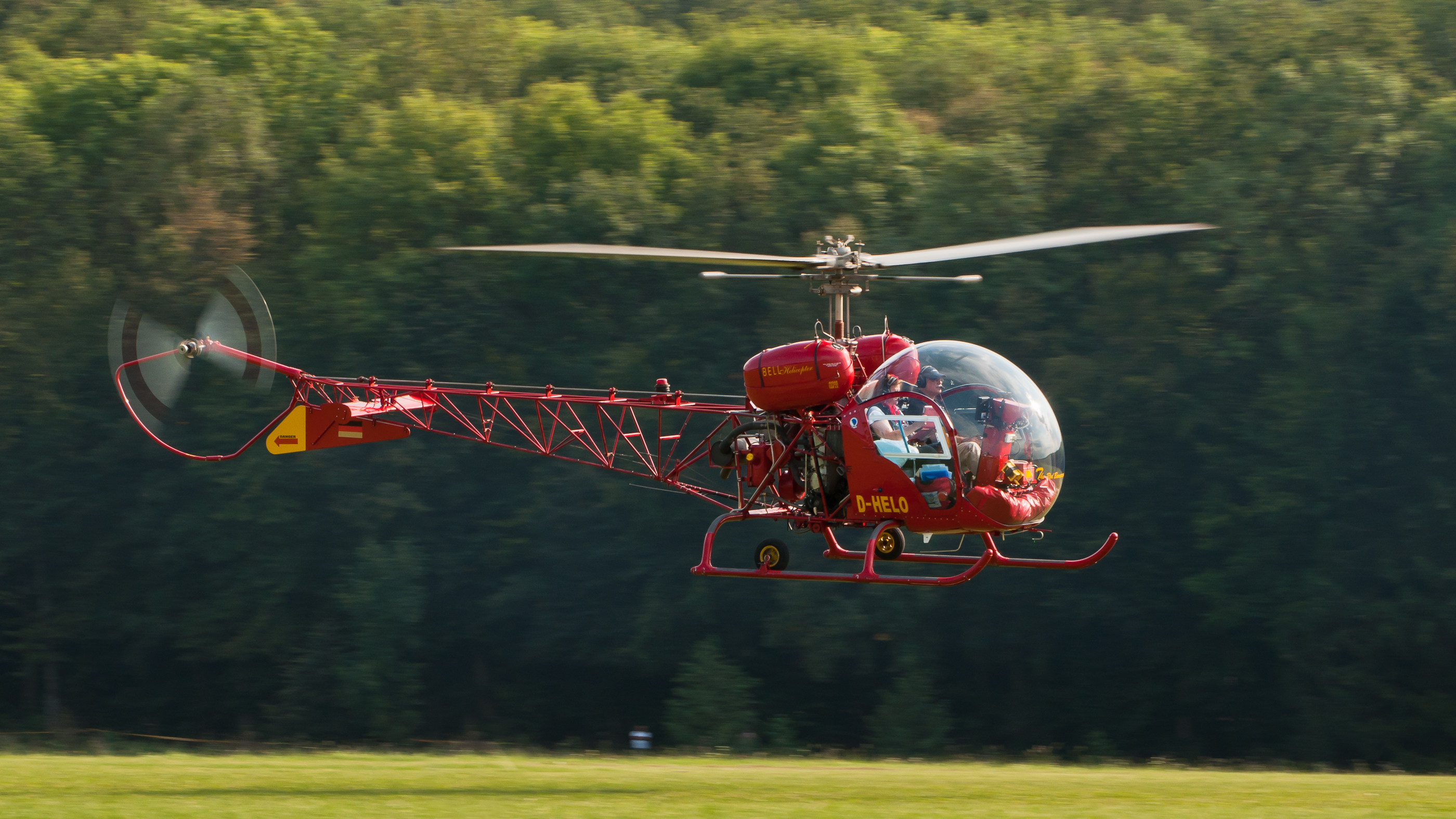
Bell 47G helicopter with its distinctive "soap-bubble" canopy

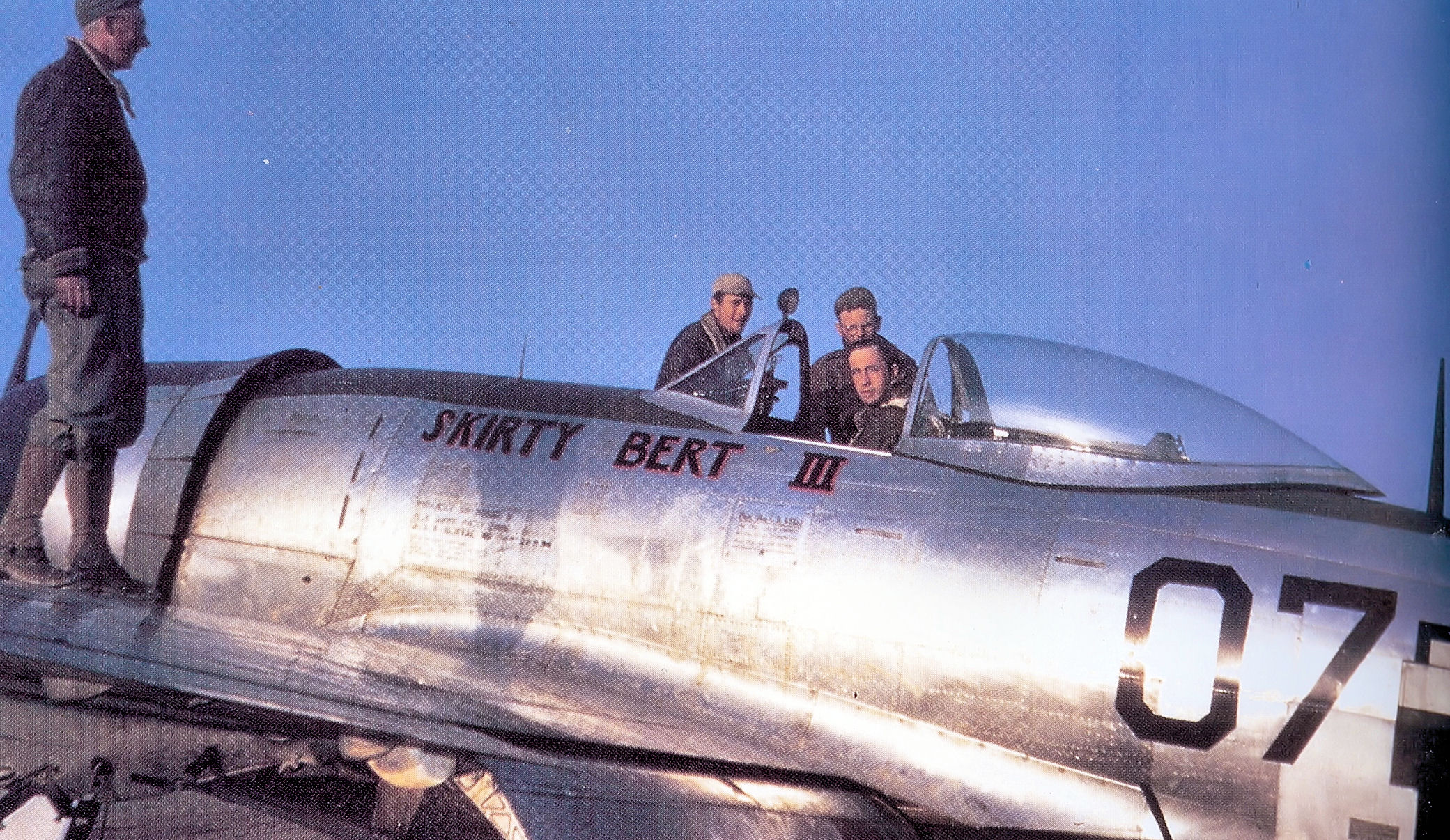
P-47 Thunderbolt

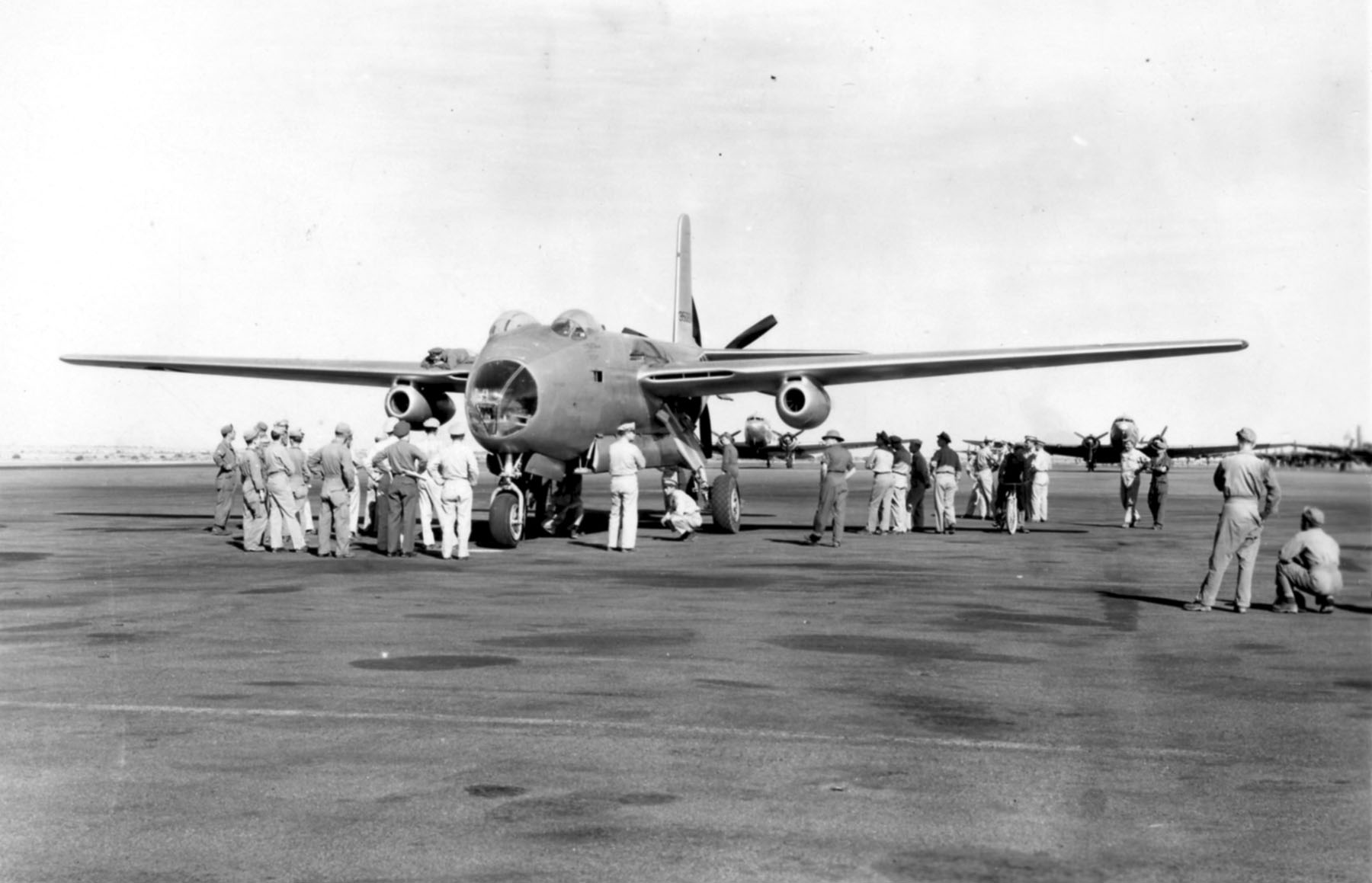
Twin bubble canopies placed side by side rather than in tandem, seen on this XB-42A

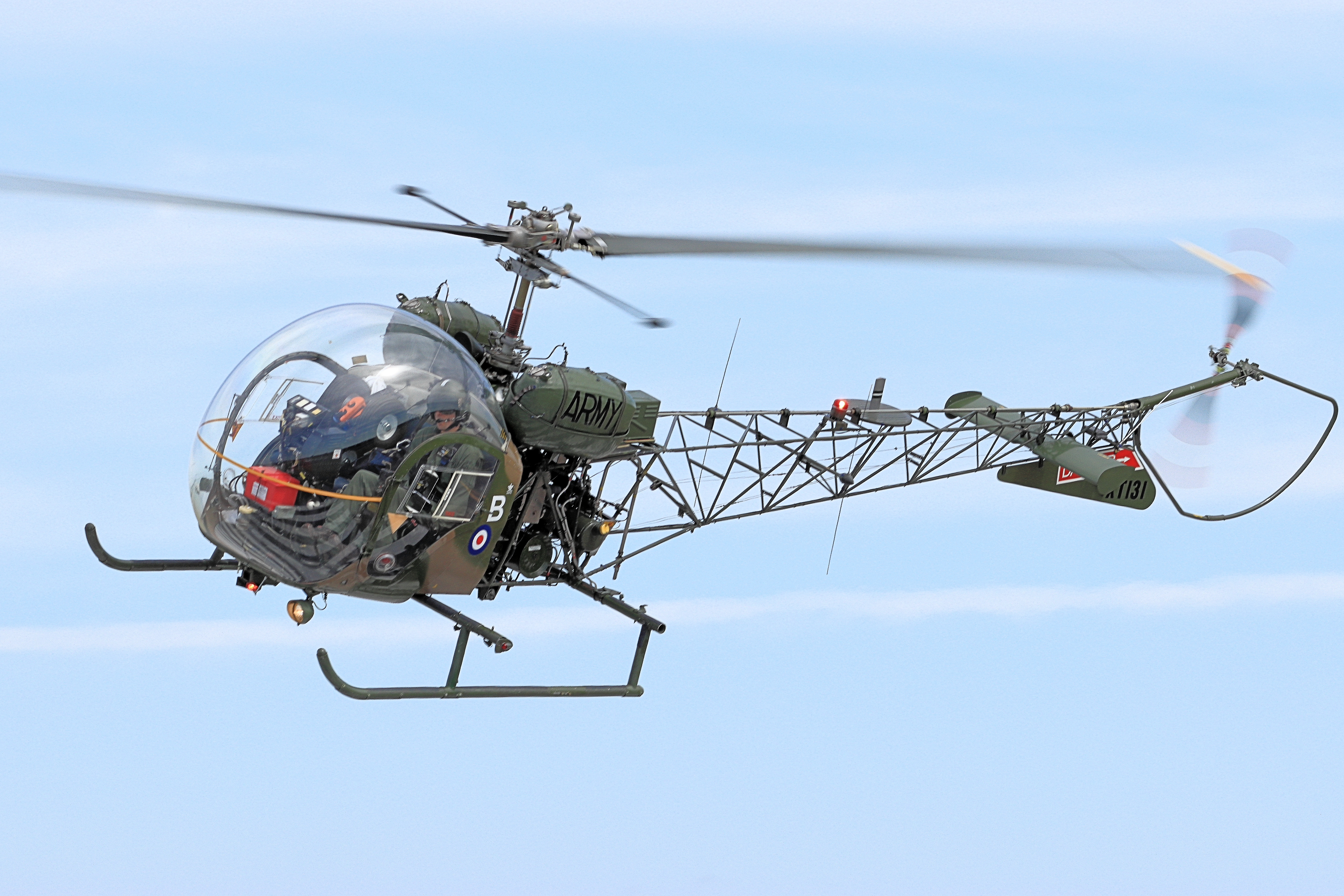
Bell H-13 Sioux helicopter with single bubble canopy

== See also ==
- Index of aviation articles
