= Ambrosini SAI.403 =

Prototype fighter aircraft

SAI.403 Dardo
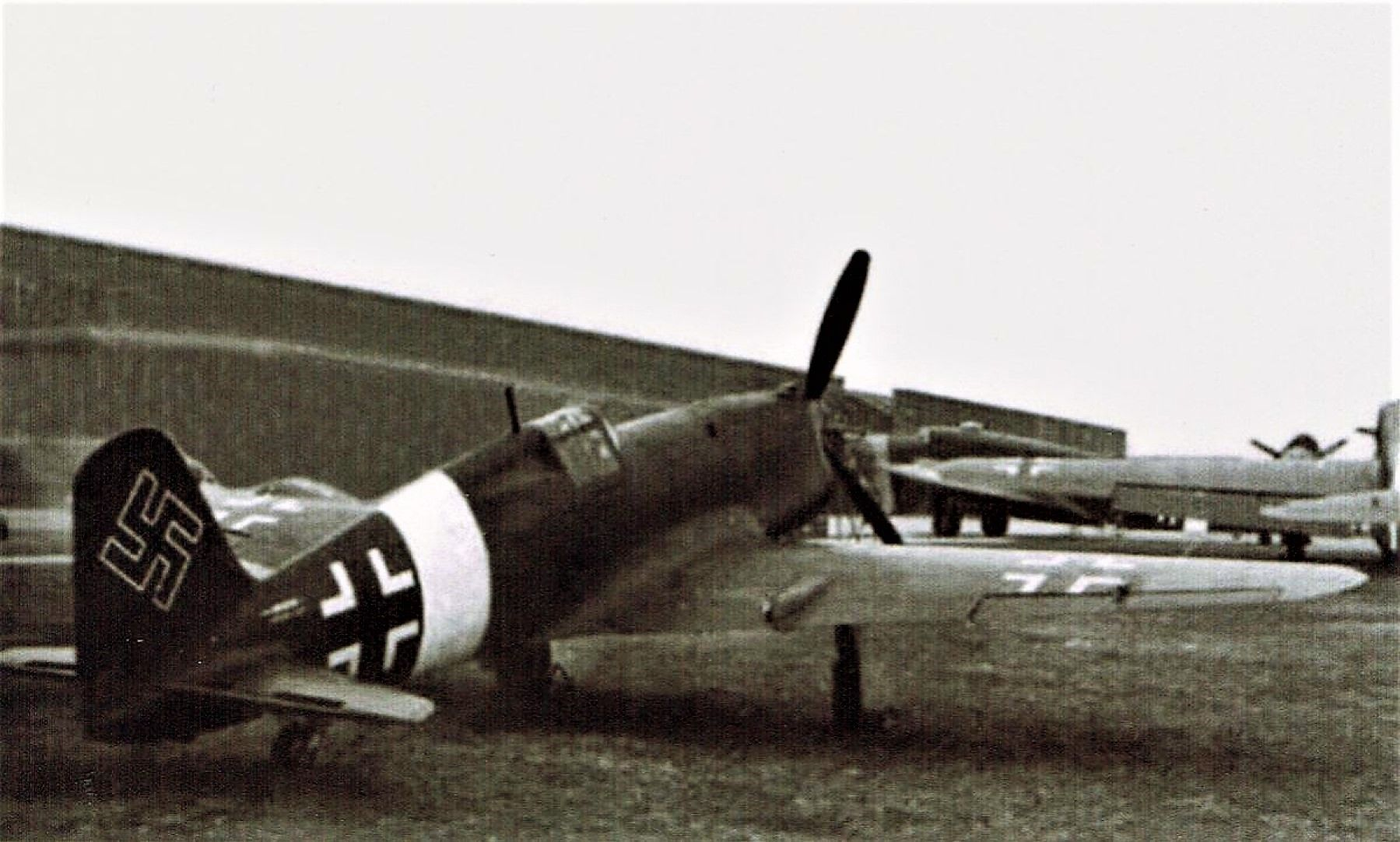
- The SAI.403 Dardo prototype with German Luftwaffe markings after its seizure by the Germans.

General information
- Type: Light fighter
- Manufacturer: Ambrosini
- Number built: 1

History
- First flight: 1943
- Developed from: Ambrosini SAI.207

The Ambrosini SAI.403 Dardo ("Dart") was a light fighter aircraft built in Italy during World War II.

== Design and development ==
SAI.403 Dardo was a considerably refined version of the SAI.207, designed during the delays in that type's development. The improvements induced the Ministero dell' Aeronautica in 1943 to cancel its order for 2,000 of the SAI.207 so as to order 3,000 of the SAI.403 instead (800 from Ambrosini, 1,000 from Caproni, and 1,200 from Savoia-Marchetti). Apart from the fighter's superlative performance, its all-wood construction was attractive at a time when Italy was facing a shortage of strategic materials. However, by the time of the Armistice, the first of these was yet to leave the factory.

== Operational history ==
The single prototype (MM.518) was seized by the Germans and evaluated by the Luftwaffe at Vergiate. Japanese pilots then stationed in Germany were also given a chance to fly the aircraft, with the result that it was ordered into production by both Heinkel and Mitsubishi. None of these flew before the end of the war.

== Variants ==
SAI.403A
Point-defense fighter (gross weight 2,478 kg/5,460 lb) armed with 2 × 12.7 mm Breda-SAFAT machine guns.
SAI.403B
Standard fighter (gross weight 2,643 kg/5,830 lb) armed with 2 × 12.7 mm Breda-SAFAT machine guns and 2 × 15 mm MG 151/15 cannons or 2 × 20 mm MG 151/20 guns.
SAI.403C
Long-range fighter with 2 × 20 mm cannons and an extra 110 L (29 US gal; 24 imp gal) internal fuel with 2x 150 L (40 US gal; 33 imp gal) drop tanks for a total range of 2,320 km (1,440 mi).

== Operators ==
Germany

- Luftwaffe (captured)

Kingdom of Italy

- Regia Aeronautica

== Specifications (prototype) ==
Data from Aircraft of the Third Reich

General characteristics

- Crew: 1
- Length: 8.2 m (26 ft 11 in)
- Wingspan: 9.8 m (32 ft 2 in)
- Height: 2.9 m (9 ft 6 in)
- Wing area: 14.46 m^{2} (155.6 sq ft)
- Empty weight: 1,893 kg (4,173 lb)
- Max takeoff weight: 2,643 kg (5,827 lb)
- Fuel capacity: 300 L (79 US gal; 66 imp gal) (Dardo-A / -B); 410 L (110 US gal; 90 imp gal) with 2 150 L (40 US gal; 33 imp gal) drop tanks (Dardo-C)
- Powerplant: 1 × Isotta-Fraschini Delta R.C.21/60 Serie I-IV inverted air-cooled V-12 piston engine, 560 kW (750 hp)
- Propellers: 3-bladed constant-speed propeller

Performance

- Maximum speed: 648 km/h (403 mph, 350 kn) at 7,200 m (23,600 ft)
- Cruise speed: 490 km/h (300 mph, 260 kn)
- Range: 935 km (581 mi, 505 nmi)
- Ferry range: 2,320 km (1,440 mi, 1,250 nmi) with drop tanks (Dardo-C)
- Service ceiling: 12,135 m (39,800 ft)
- Rate of climb: 15.9 m/s (3,130 ft/min)
- Time to altitude: 6,000 m (20,000 ft) in 6 minutes 40 seconds

Armament

- Guns:
- 2× fuselage-mounted 12.7 mm (0.500 in) Breda-SAFAT machine guns - (Dardo-A)
- 2× fuselage-mounted 12.7 mm (0.500 in) Breda-SAFAT machine guns and 2× wing-mounted 15 mm (0.591 in) MG 151/15 cannon or 20 mm (0.787 in) MG 151/20 cannon - (Dardo-B)
- 2× wing-mounted 20 mm (0.787 in) MG 151/20 cannon - (Dardo-C)
