= Roussel R-30 =

French 1930s fighter-bomber prototype

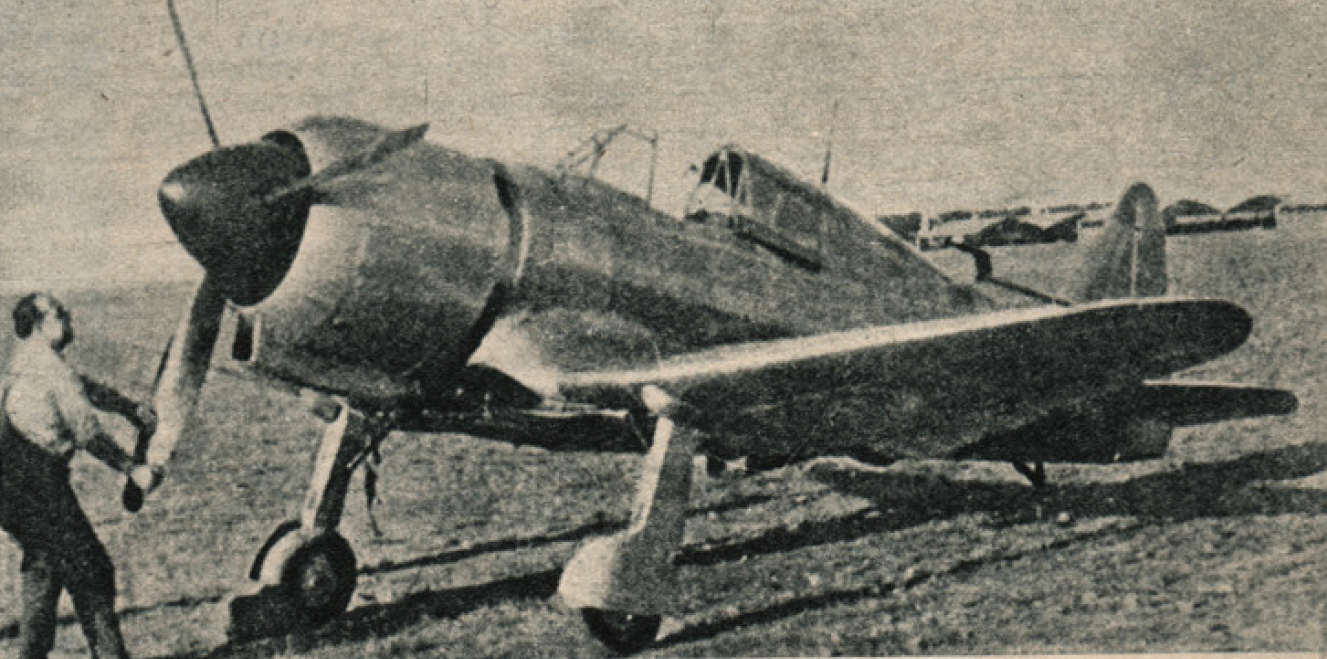

General information
- Type: Fighter-bomber
- National origin: France
- Designer: Jacques Roussel
- Number built: 1 prototype

History
- First flight: August 1939

The Roussel R-30 was a French light fighter-bomber prototype of the 1930s.

== Design and development ==
Only one prototype, similar to the Bloch MB.150 but reduced in size and weight, was constructed in 1938 armed with two 20 mm (0.787 in) Hispano-Suiza HS.404 cannons. Whilst being re-engined with a 600 kW (800 hp) power plant, the German invasion reached Paris. The airframe was transported to Bordeaux, where the sole R-30 was destroyed when the building it was being stored in was destroyed in a blaze.

== Specifications ==
Data from The Complete Book of Fighters

General characteristics

- Crew: 1
- Length: 6.10 m (20 ft 0 in)
- Wingspan: 7.72 m (25 ft 4 in)
- Height: 2.10 m (6 ft 11 in)
- Wing area: 10 m^{2} (110 sq ft)
- Empty weight: 1,030 kg (2,271 lb)
- Max takeoff weight: 1,768 kg (3,898 lb)
- Powerplant: 1 × Gnome-Rhône 14M-7 14-cyl air-cooled radial piston engine, 510 kW (690 hp)

Performance

- Maximum speed: 520 km/h (320 mph, 280 kn) at 5,800 m (19,000 ft)
- Range: 1,200 km (750 mi, 650 nmi)
- Endurance: 2 hours
- Rate of climb: 19 m/s (3,700 ft/min)

Armament

- Guns: 2x 20 mm (0.787 in) Hispano-Suiza HS.404 cannon
- Bombs: 1× 250 kg (550 lb) bomb
