= Boeing 307 Stratoliner =

US-built pressurized airliner with four piston engines, 1938

Boeing 307/C-75 Stratoliner
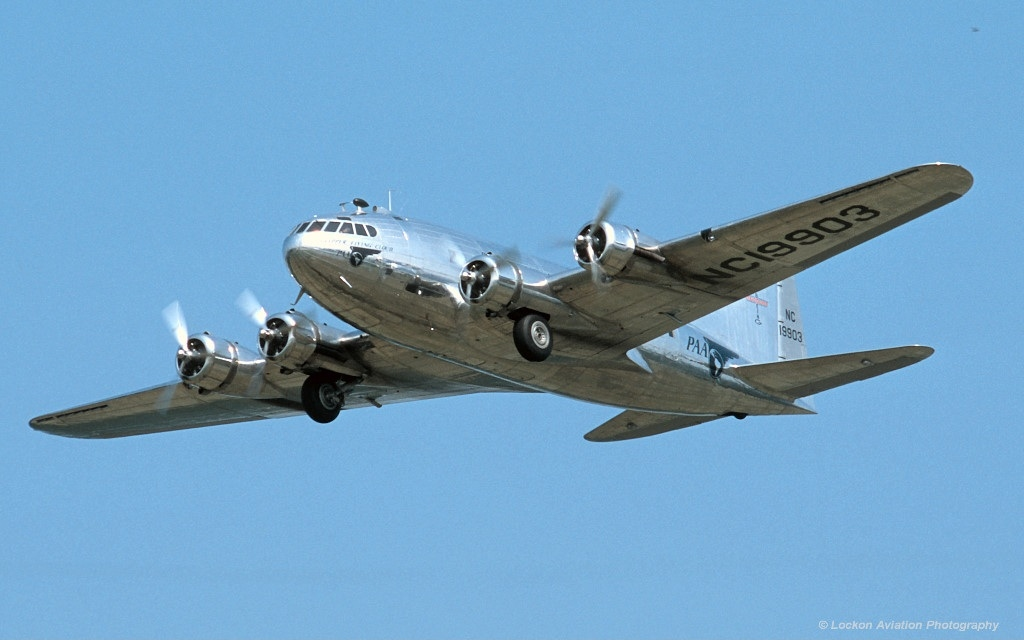

General information
- Type: Airliner
- National origin: United States
- Manufacturer: Boeing
- Status: Retired
- Primary users: Transcontinental & Western Air Aigle Azur; United States Army Air Forces; Pan American Airways
- Number built: 10

History
- Introduction date: July 4, 1940 with Pan American Airways
- First flight: December 31, 1938
- Retired: 1975
- Developed from: Boeing B-17 Flying Fortress

The Boeing Model 307 Stratoliner (or Strato-Clipper in Pan American service, or C-75 in USAAF service) is an American stressed-skin four-engine low-wing tailwheel monoplane airliner derived from the B-17 Flying Fortress bomber, which entered commercial service in July 1940. It was the first airliner in revenue service with a pressurized cabin, which, along with supercharged engines, allowed it to cruise above the weather. As such it represented a major advance over contemporaries, with a cruising speed of 220 mph (350 km/h) at 20,000 ft (6,100 m) compared to the Douglas DC-3's 160 mph (260 km/h), at 8,000 ft (2,400 m) then in service. When it entered commercial service it had a crew of five to six, including two pilots, a flight engineer, two flight attendants, and an optional navigator and had a capacity for 33 passengers, which later modifications increased, first to 38, and eventually to 60.

== Development ==
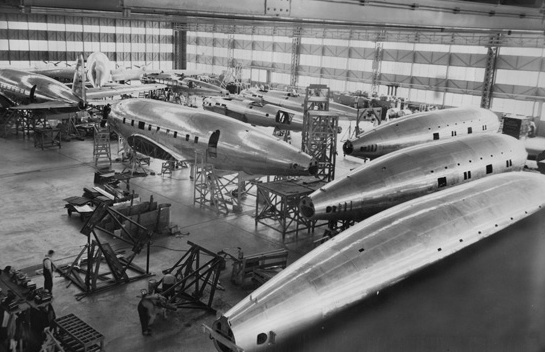
Boeing S-307 Stratoliner production line, with early B-17s to the rear

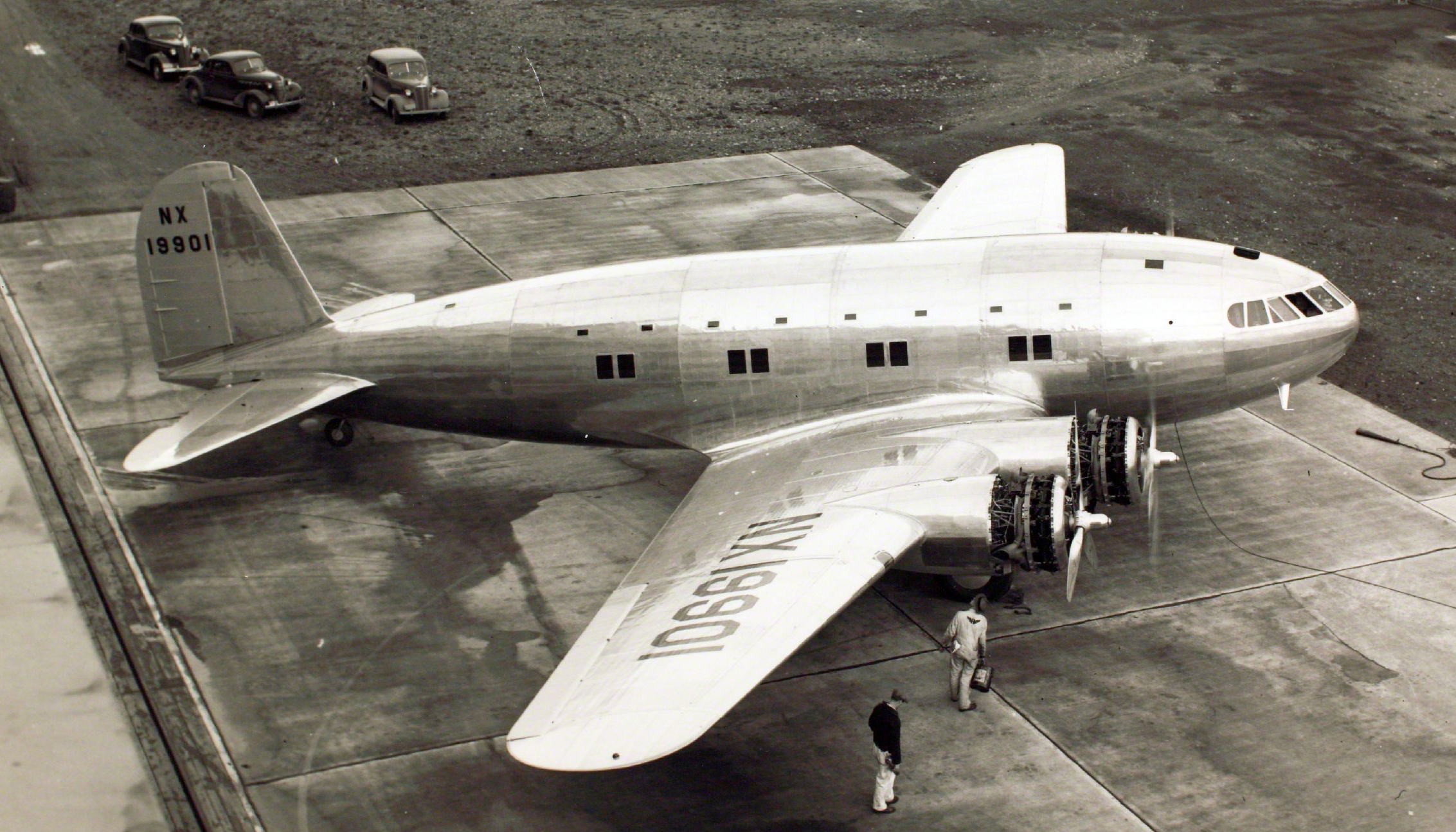
Prototype Model 307 NX19901 with the small tail as initially designed, and which caused its loss

In 1935, Pan American Airways, United Airlines, American Airlines, Eastern Air Lines, and Transcontinental & Western Air (TWA) had each signed a contract with Douglas to develop the forty-passenger DC-4 (later known as the DC-4E). Each company contributed $100,000 (Note: equivalent to $2,348,301 in 2025) to development costs and agreed to not operate other aircraft with a maximum weight of 43,000 to 75,000 lb (20,000 to 34,000 kg) for revenue service. Due to development problems and poor performance, all of the airlines dropped out of the DC-4 program and cancelled their orders, but a requirement for a large four-engine airliner remained.

Donald Webb Tomlinson at TWA carried out five years of high altitude flight research, with a Northrop Gamma and a Douglas DC-1, which helped determine that TWA would need a four-engine airliner with a pressurized cabin. During this period, he also test-flew the XB-17 and determined that it would provide an ideal basis for an airliner, and so Boeing was approached with the idea. A ceiling of at least 16,000 ft (4,900 m) was required both to avoid summertime "chop" over the Rocky Mountains and to allow the aircraft to fly around the thunderstorms that can sometimes block mountain passes, which meant a pressurized cabin would be the most comfortable for passengers on long flights. In 1935, Boeing then designed a four-engine airliner using components from the Boeing Model 299 B-17 Flying Fortress heavy bomber as the Model 307. It combined the wings, tail, rudder, undercarriage, and engines from the B-17 with a new, much larger pressurized circular–cross-section fuselage with a maximum diameter of 138 in (3.5 m).

The pressurization system required extensive testing, which was carried out over many months, progressively increasing the air pressure after each successful test, and each time, the highly polished fuselage was coated with soapy water while the fuselage was pressurized, for workers to look for the bubbles that would indicate a leak, much like testing a bicycle inner tube.

Before the first aircraft had rolled out, TWA's chief engineer discovered that the extruded metal tubing used for the wing spars was defective, with stress corrosion cracks produced by cold rolling the tubing to increase tensile strength. Affected aircraft included the prototype, the first Pan Am machine, and some early production B-17s, and this resulted in TWA having to have their engineers inspect every tube that was to be incorporated into their aircraft.

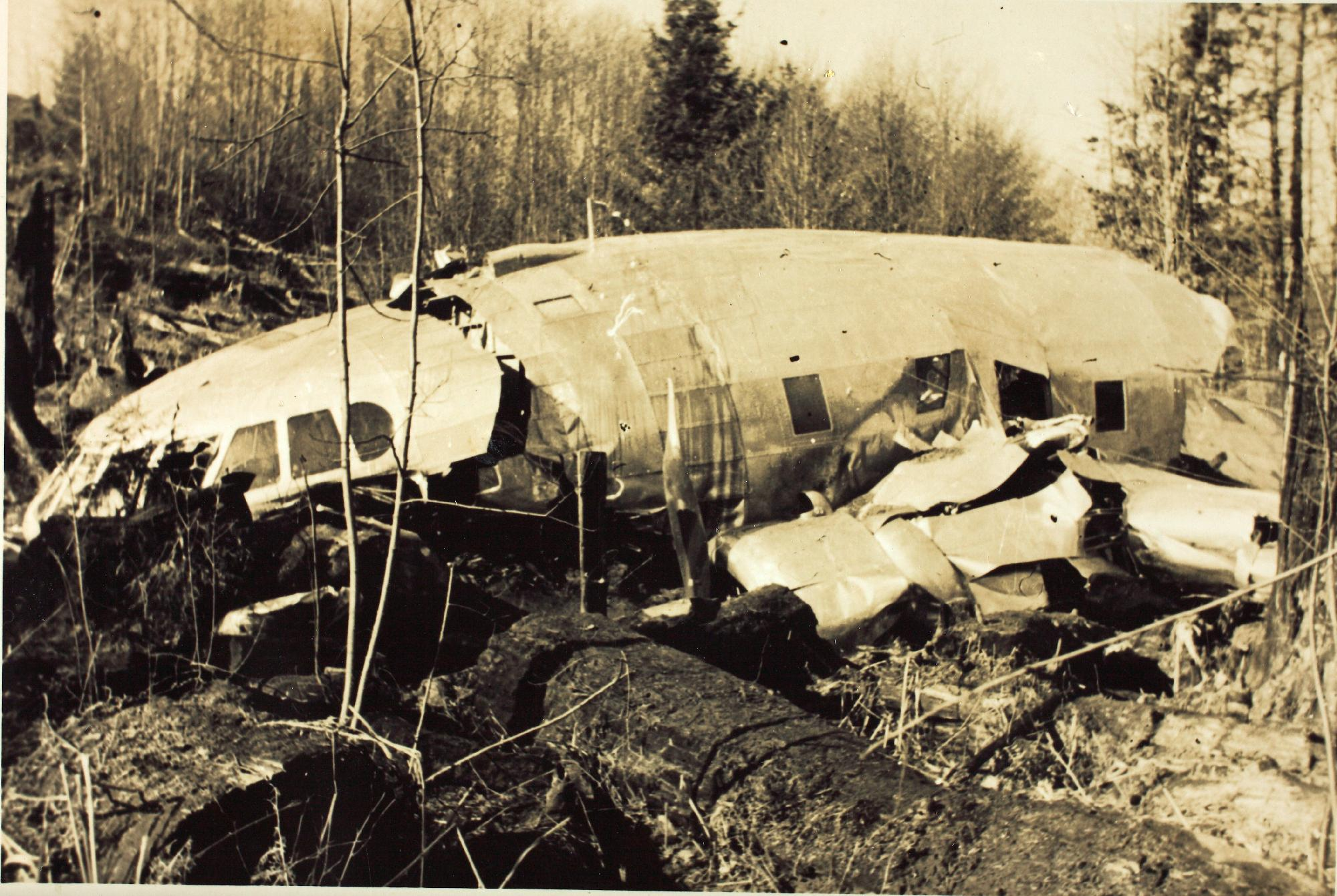
Wreck of the prototype, NX19901

The first aircraft completed, registration NX19901, crashed on March 18, 1939, while being demonstrated after having been recently fitted with instruments to measure flight control forces. The Boeing 307 took off at 12:57 pm (local time) from Boeing Field in Seattle with ten occupants, and they climbed to an altitude of 11,000 ft (3,400 m), where stability tests were made and, while carrying out side-slips near Alder, the aircraft stalled and entered a spin. It made two to three turns before the pilot was able to stop the spin using the engines, however, the ensuing high-speed dive and the forces that resulted from attempting to pull up before hitting the ground resulted in the left outer wing tearing off with one engine still attached, followed by the right wing, just outside the outer engine, both of which also tore off parts of the tail as a result of the aileron cables pulling them against the fuselage, which then caused the aircraft to pancake into a forested area at 1:17 pm. All ten aboard were killed, which included TWA's representative, KLM's technical director, a Dutch Air Ministry representative, and Boeing's test pilot, their Chief Aerodynamicist, and their Chief Engineer. Parachutes were available but the force of the spin prevented their use.

The crash delayed the program by over a year, beginning with a three-month investigation by the US Civil Aeronautics Authority, the precursor to the current Federal Aviation Administration, and Boeing to determine the causes. Flight and wind tunnel testing showed that both an extended dorsal fin and an enlarged vertical tail were needed to prevent the rudder stalling in a yaw, and solutions were flight-tested on NC19903, including an intermediate solution consisting of just an extended dorsal fin. The resulting redesign was also incorporated into the redesign of the rear fuselage of the B-17E bomber. The wings were reinforced and Handley Page slots were added to the outer wing leading edges to improve low-speed aileron control while the inboard flaps were also extended. The first several aircraft, including NC19902, NC19903, and NC19904, were all rolled out with the small tail and then modified later.

Test flights resumed on May 19, 1939, after the changes had been incorporated, and on June 20, 1939, the first flight was made with the "supercharged cabin" pressurization system on.

On March 13, 1940, Approved Type Certificate (ATC) number 719 was assigned to the Pan Am Boeing 307s, allowing commercial deliveries to commence. A second ATC was issued for the TWA aircraft, number 726, due to the numerous differences between the Pan Am and the TWA aircraft.

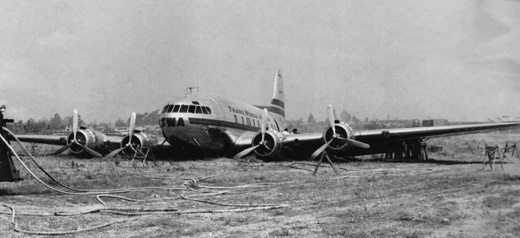
TWA Boeing SA-307B NC19905 on May 17, 1940, after the engines iced up and it made a forced landing

TWA was concerned about excessive undercarriage stiffness from their experience with the test flights with the XB-17, which were to be modified for the airliner. TWA flight-tested the modified undercarriage and in hard landings easily exceeded the contract's minimum required 500 ft/min (2.5 m/s) descent rate with a successful 800 ft/min (4.1 m/s) landing descent.

TWA was also concerned about the engine carburetor intake heaters being deliberately restricted by Boeing to prevent cooking the engines, which could potentially leave crews unable to clear ice. Their point was made when icing problems during a test flight on May 17, 1940, with NC19905, while carrying dignitaries in overcast conditions over mountains resulted in three of the four engines failing, while the fourth was losing power, despite every measure being taken to clear the ice. This resulted in the aircraft making a belly landing in a field with a partially lowered undercarriage, just south of Lamar, Colorado. TWA then modified the carburetor heating themselves and the aircraft was repaired and returned to service.

Boeing made claims both in their period advertising and in their current web site that it was the first high-altitude commercial transport and the first with a flight engineer. However, its first flight, on December 31, 1938, was later than that of the Renard R-35, which also had a pressurized cabin for passengers and flew on April 1, 1938, but that craft crashed and its development was abandoned. As for employing a flight engineer, it was preceded in the US on a commercial aircraft by Maddux Air Lines Ford Trimotors, whose "Mate" had the same responsibilities as a flight engineer. Additionally, all German World War One Riesenflugzeug multi-engine bombers had flight engineers as they were integral to the specification.

== Design ==
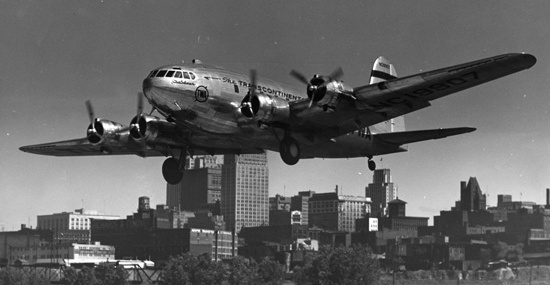
TWA Boeing SA-307B NC19907, Zuni, fleet number 402, landing with slotted flaps lowered, prewar

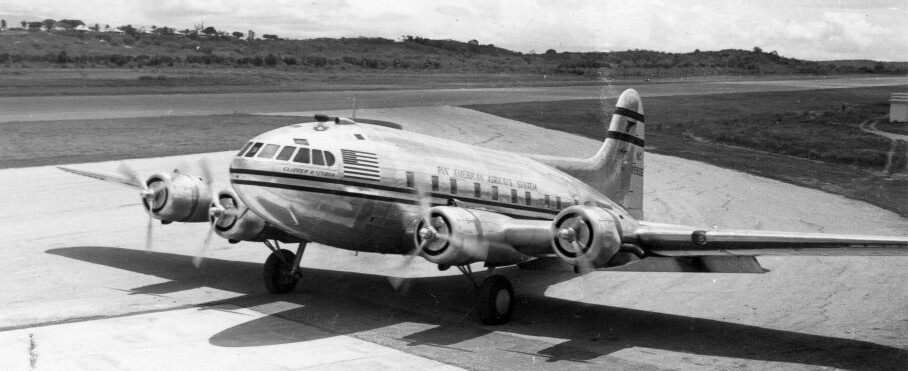
Pan Am Boeing S-307 Stratoliner NC19902 Clipper Rainbow with blanking plates installed on engines to prevent engine over-cooling

As built, the Stratoliner used the all-metal stressed-skin cantilever wings from the B-17C mounted low on the fuselage to a constant-chord center section faired to the fuselage, with four 1,100 hp (820 kW) Wright GR-1820 Cyclone air-cooled radial engines. TWA examples used GR-1820-G105A engines fitted with two-stage superchargers for high-altitude performance, while the Pan Am examples used the GR-1820-G102 with a single-stage supercharger. To reduce noise, engine exhaust collector rings and mufflers were installed. TWA aircraft were fitted with cowl flaps, to adjust engine cooling air, while Pan Am aircraft had fixed cowling rings without cowling gills. When operating in cooler conditions, the Pan Am aircraft could be fitted with blanking disks that partially covered the fronts of the engines. Both versions had sufficient power to maintain altitude on only two engines, one of the KLM requirements. Both used three-bladed Hamilton Standard Hydromatic constant-speed propellers, and new high-octane fuels were developed to help the engines operate under the increased supercharger pressure. Both versions had trailing-edge flaps controlled with electric motors, although the SA-307B, for TWA, and the SB-307B, for Hughes, featured slotted flaps with prominent external hinges, while the Pan Am examples had simpler split flaps with flush hinges, similar to those used on the B-17s. All of the fuel was carried in the wings, with, in each wing, a 212.5 US gal (804 L; 176.9 imp gal) tank between the inboard nacelle and the fuselage, a 425 US gal (1,610 L; 354 imp gal) main tank, and a 212.5 US gal (804 L; 176.9 imp gal) tank between the inner and outer nacelles, making a total capacity of 1,700 US gal (6,400 L; 1,400 imp gal) in six tanks. With the fuselage being 3.5 ft (1.1 m) wider than that of the B-17, the span had increased from 103 ft 9 in (31.62 m) to 107 ft 3 in (32.69 m) compared to early B-17s. After being modified, the SA-307B-1s used the wings and elevators from the B-17G, with split flaps, and 1,200 hp (890 kW) Cyclones. On most, but not all, examples, the leading edges of the wings, horizontal stabilizer, and fin were fitted with rubber expanding-type de-icing boots, which would inflate and deflate repeatedly to break ice from the flying surfaces. All movable surfaces, including the rudder, ailerons, and elevators had fabric over metal structures and were aerodynamically balanced and fitted with adjustable trim tabs to lighten flight loads. The rudder and elevators also had hydraulic boost to lighten control forces. The partially retractable main undercarriage had hydraulic brakes, used Goodyear 55×19×23 tires, and was raised and lowered with electric motors. Manual backups were provided for electrically driven systems, but the power had to be turned off before being used. A parking brake was provided, along with an emergency air brake system run off a bottle of compressed air, while the tailwheel was fully retractable.

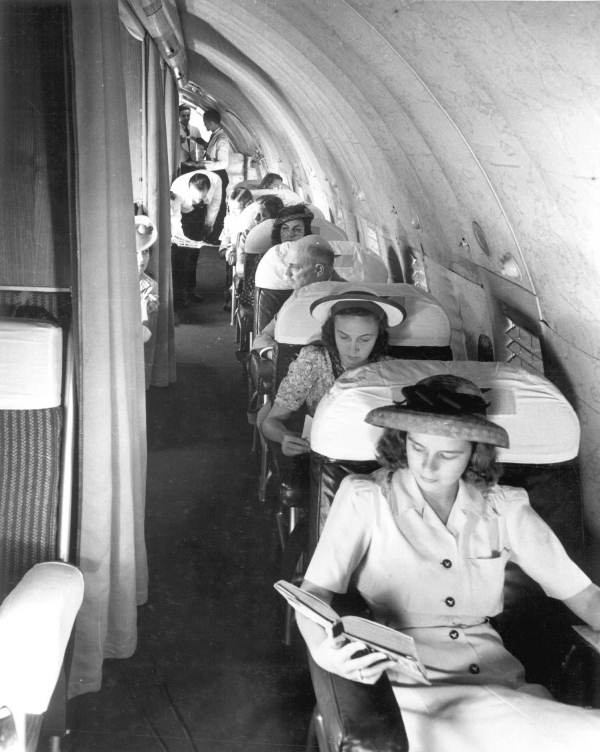
Passengers on Pan Am Strato-Clipper in the Raymond Loewy-designed interior. Seats on the left could be folded into sleeper bunks.

The fuselage was described as being dirigible-shaped and was an elongated teardrop, with a 11.5 ft (3.5 m) constant-diameter tube lengthening it at its widest point. The circular-section fuselage was of all-metal construction, skinned with 24ST Alclad and capable of maintaining a cabin pressure equivalent to 8,000 ft (2,400 m) when flying at a 16,000 ft (4,900 m) altitude and 12,000 ft (3,700 m) when at 20,000 ft (6,100 m), with a maximum pressure difference of 2.5 lb/sq ft (12 kg/m^{2}). The structure was designed with strength reserves so as to handle as much as 6 lb/sq ft (29 kg/m^{2}), but a pressure relief valve prevented the pressure difference from exceeding 2.65 lb/sq ft (12.9 kg/m^{2}). The structure consisted of continuous longitudinal stiffeners spaced every nine degrees around the fuselage with radial hoop stiffeners mounted every 16 in (410 mm) along the fuselage, reinforcing the similarity to a dirigible. The skin seams were sealed with tape impregnated with sealing compound trapped between lapped joints which were secured with two rows of rivets spaced 5/8 in (16 mm) apart, while doors and hatches were sealed with soft rubber gaskets and control cables entered the pressurized cabin through specially developed glands designed to allow free movement of the cables with a negligible amount of air leakage. The main cockpit windows were made from 5/8 in (16 mm) thick la glass, while the rest of the windows were made of Plexiglass or Lucite sealed into rubber channels. A large ram-air scoop on the cabin roof was provided to supply cooling air while at lower altitudes, and it was shut off when the cabin was pressurized at higher altitudes. The cockpit was fitted with an autopilot, radios, and a radio direction finder (RDF) for navigation.

The industrial designer Raymond Loewy designed the passenger cabin, with furnishings provided by Marshall Field's. It was divided into four compartments, each with six deep comfortable reclining chairs which could be converted into sixteen sleeping berths. Each compartment was provided with adjustable air conditioning vents, reading lights, and a call button. Nine additional seats were provided along the port side of the aircraft, while washrooms which doubled as dressing rooms were provided at both ends of the cabin. The rear washroom was for women and was named the Ladies’ Charm Room. Its walls were covered in heavy plate-glass mirrors, and it contained in its 34 sq ft (3.2 m^{2}) area two dressing tables, each with a sink, plush upholstered stools, soft indirect lighting provided by fluorescent lamps, ashtrays, hot and cold running water, shelves with towels, and a separate cubicle for the toilet. The men's washroom was in front as the Men's Lounge and also had a separate cubicle for the toilet, two sinks, and outlets to run electric razors. A galley of just 28 sq ft (2.6 m^{2}) providing hot food was situated at the rear of the cabin, behind which was positioned the rear hemispherical pressure bulkhead. Up to 412 cu ft (11.7 m^{3}) or 6,590 lb (2,990 kg) of baggage could be stowed under the floor of the cabin, both between the wing spars and behind the rear spar, and it was accessible in flight, through a hatch in the cabin floor, or on the ground through three hatches on the underside of the fuselage. Extensive use was made of the latest in soundproofing, and the Dynafocal engine shock mounts were designed to reduce vibrations felt by passengers. The air-conditioning system used both electrical and mechanical approaches, with a vent in the leading edge of each wing near the root to bring outside air to two engine-driven superchargers that compressed the air, which was then passed through radiator condensers to cool the air, and it was then run through channels to the vents in the cabin. External hookups allowed ground air conditioner units to cool the cabin air when the engines were off.

=== Crew ===
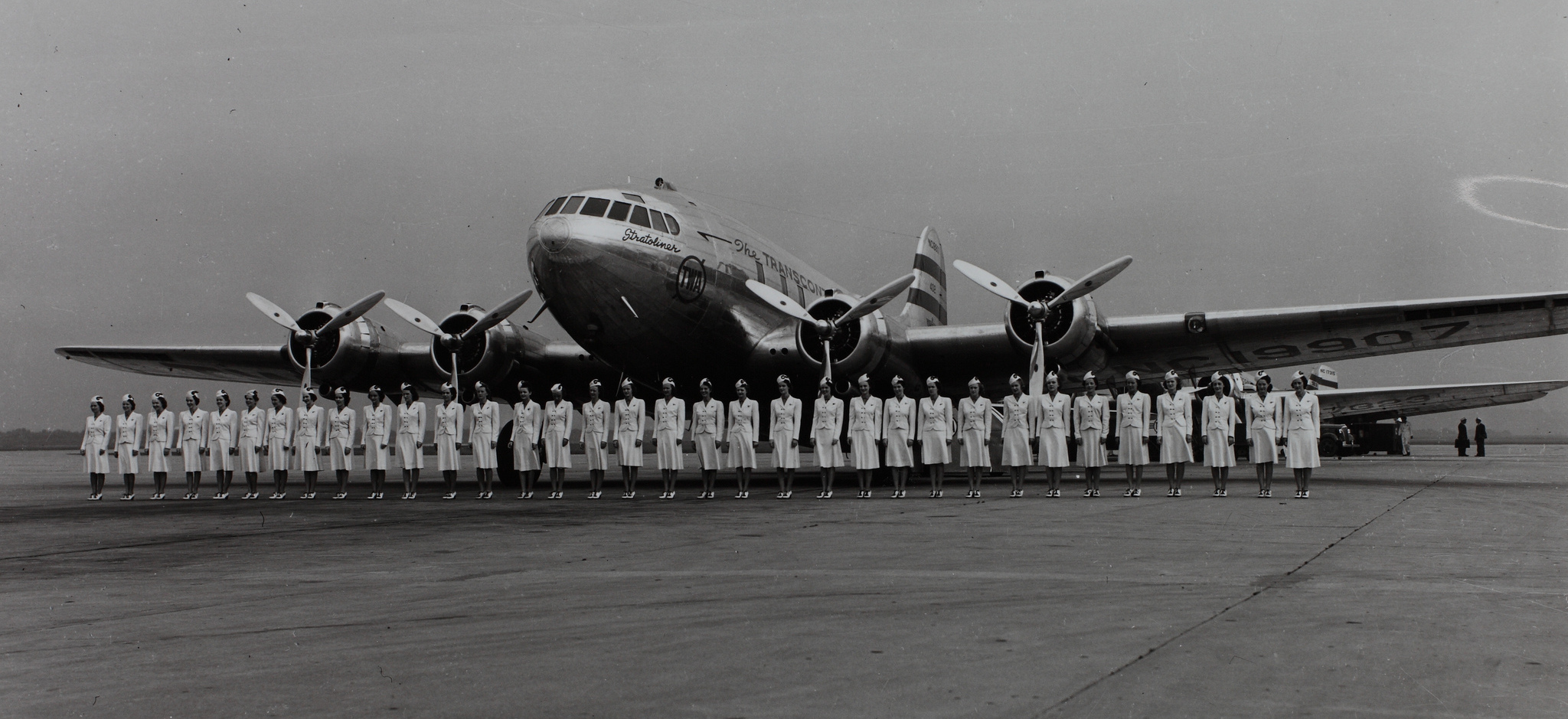
Newly graduated Hostesses lined up in front of Zuni, TWA's Stratoliner NC19907, in early to mid-1940

The Stratoliner was normally flown with a pilot and co-pilot, and both Pan Am and TWA aircraft carried a flight engineer to reduce the workload on the two pilots by monitoring the engines for any problems and fine tuning them, while they also controlled fuel consumption from each of the tanks to maintain the aircraft's fore–aft and lateral balance. Too much fuel used in one tank could result in the aircraft becoming uncontrollable. They also monitored other aircraft systems, including hydraulics and the cabin pressurization system. The flight engineer was also an aircraft maintenance engineer (AME) and, aside from operating the radio, which required training in Morse code, he was also responsible for all technical issues and would carry out repairs and maintenance on the 307. Each Pan Am aircraft had one additional crew member compared to TWA aircraft: Because they made long overwater flights, they carried a navigator, who was not yet considered necessary by the CAA for overland flights, which were served by a network of beacons across the continent when the aircraft were not being flown by visual flight rules (VFR).

Both TWA and Pan Am normally carried two flight attendants on each aircraft. TWA began using Hostesses, as they called them, as cabin crew in late 1935, while Pan Am continued to use male stewards until late in World War II.

=== C-75 conversion ===
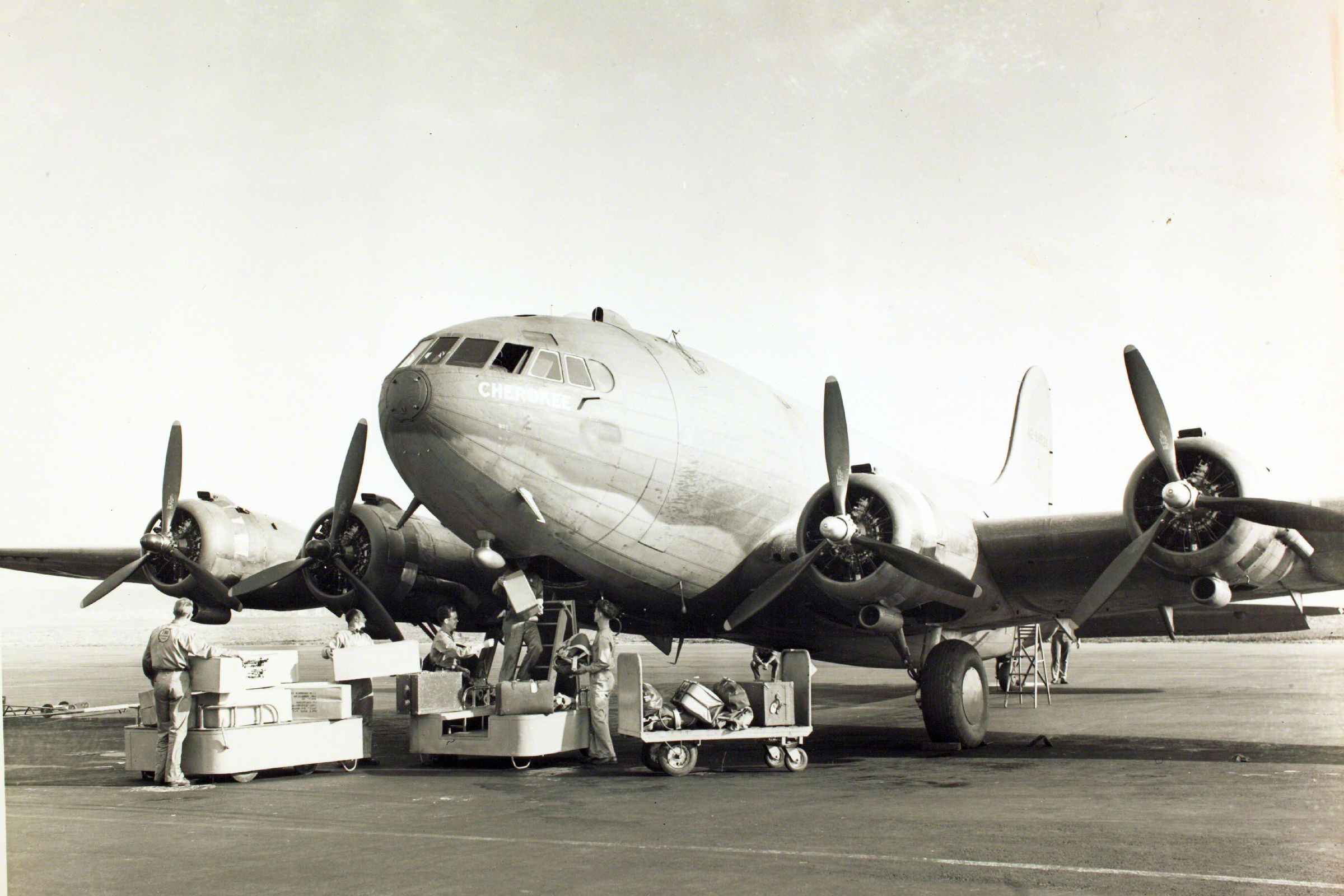
42-88623 Cherokee loading up following conversion to C-75 standard

Following the entry of the United States into World War II in December 1941, long-range transports were needed to ferry government and military officials around the globe and many aircraft, including TWA's Boeing 307s, were pressed into service. Beginning in February 1942, these were flown to Albuquerque, New Mexico for conversion, which included the removal of the plush, but heavy, civilian fittings, including the massive mirrors in the women's "charm room", and the pressurization system, to save weight. The sound insulation was also stripped out leaving the cabin much noisier than it had been. The forward (men's) washroom and the forward two of the four passenger compartments were replaced with five gravity-fed 212.5 US gal (804 L; 176.9 imp gal) fuel tanks and a 45 US gal (170 L; 37 imp gal) oil tank fed with a wobble pump, along with a rest area for the crew. A desk was added behind the pilot for a radio operator, who had a 50-Watt Bendix TA-12 high-frequency Morse transmitter and a BC-348 tunable receiver. A 400 ft (120 m) trailing wire antenna was used with a 5 lb (2.3 kg) lead weight on the end – which the radio operator needed to remember to reel in, by hand, when landing. Inexperience sometimes led to the antenna either being torn off or lashing against the fuselage. An astrodome was fitted and the Perspex top windows, which produced excessive parallax, were replaced with optically flat glass to allow the navigator to compare the positions of stars to the horizon to determine latitude when crossing large bodies of water. The SA-307B-1s retained the astrodomes when converted back from C-75 in 1944. To further aid navigation, a B-3 driftmeter was installed along with an aperiodic compass that did not lag or lead in turns as a conventional compass does. Mae West life vests and life rafts were also provided.

The landing gear was strengthened, and the maximum takeoff weight was increased from 45,000 to 56,000 lb (20,000 to 25,000 kg), leaving the Stratoliner underpowered, and the climb suffered accordingly. The overloading burnt out engines and destroyed piston rings, but closely monitoring engine oil consumption often caught failures before they occurred.

Passenger facilities were reduced to four bunks which when folded away allowed seating for twelve, along with four seats along the opposite side of the aircraft. Removable tables were provided in the cabin to lay out maps and do paperwork. The exterior was then camouflaged in standard USAAF colours, with olive drab upper surfaces and neutral grey undersides, and each aircraft had its name painted on the nose and over the cabin door, which would also be used by many later operators. The names had previously been used in TWA publicity but not painted on the aircraft.

After three years the USAAF had amassed sufficient long-range transports that it no longer needed the C-75s, and they sold the fleet back to TWA, who paid to have them converted back to civil standard under Boeing's SA-307B-1 designation. CAA concerns over cracks in the wing spar tubing led to the TWA Stratoliners getting new B-17G wings and horizontal stabilizers, with the leading edge of the longer-span, narrower-chord horizontal stabilizers moved about 3 ft (90 cm) aft, while more powerful versions of the same Wright Cyclone engines increased power from 1,100 to 1,200 hp (820 to 890 kW), but without the B-17G's turbosuperchargers. New propellers and landing gear were also installed. The change to the tailplane required that the structural bulkhead supporting the forward spar be moved aft, while the rear bulkhead was reworked and additional fuselage stiffeners were added. The tailwheel switched to using B-17G wheels and 26 in (66 cm) smooth-tread tires, which required that the wheel well be enlarged and structure supporting the tailwheel reinforced. The main undercarriage wheels, tires, tubes, and brakes remained unchanged, although the legs themselves were strengthened. The fuselages were stripped to bare metal and rewired with a 24 VDC 1800-Amp system from the B-29 Superfortress, replacing the original 24 VDC 800-Amp system. Maximum weight was increased to 54,000 lb (24,000 kg) and the maximum landing weight rose to 47,000 lb (21,000 kg). Slots were re-incorporated into the wingtip leading edges as they had been with the pre-war airliners. The cabin was redesigned and passenger capacity was increased from 33 to 38, with the cabin divided into a 10-seat front section and a 28-seat rear section, with no sleepers. The cabin pressurization system was never re-installed. The B-17G wings came with turbo-supercharger ducting for the engines that was not needed for the simpler supercharger installation used on the Stratoliner, while one duct opening was retained on each wing between the engine nacelles to provide additional cabin air. Further mods made by TWA included improved soundproofing and temperature control, and on March 15, 1945, the B-1 recertification tests were completed to the CAA's satisfaction. The estimated cost to repurchase and refurbish the five aircraft was $2 million. (Note: equivalent to $35,767,098 in 2025)

== Variants ==
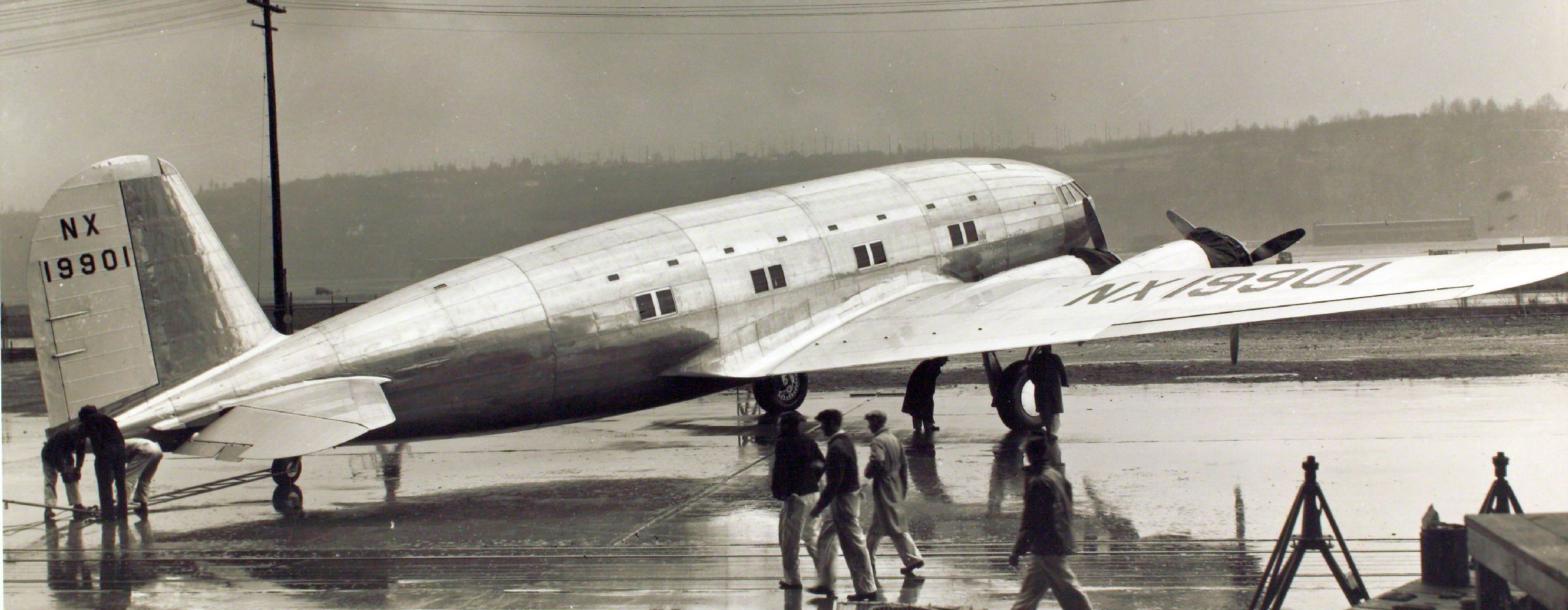
Prototype of the S-307, with the small tail used initially on the first three examples built

300
Original unpressurized 35,200 lb (16,000 kg) proposal, with seating for 16–24 passengers, which began as a four-engined Boeing 247.

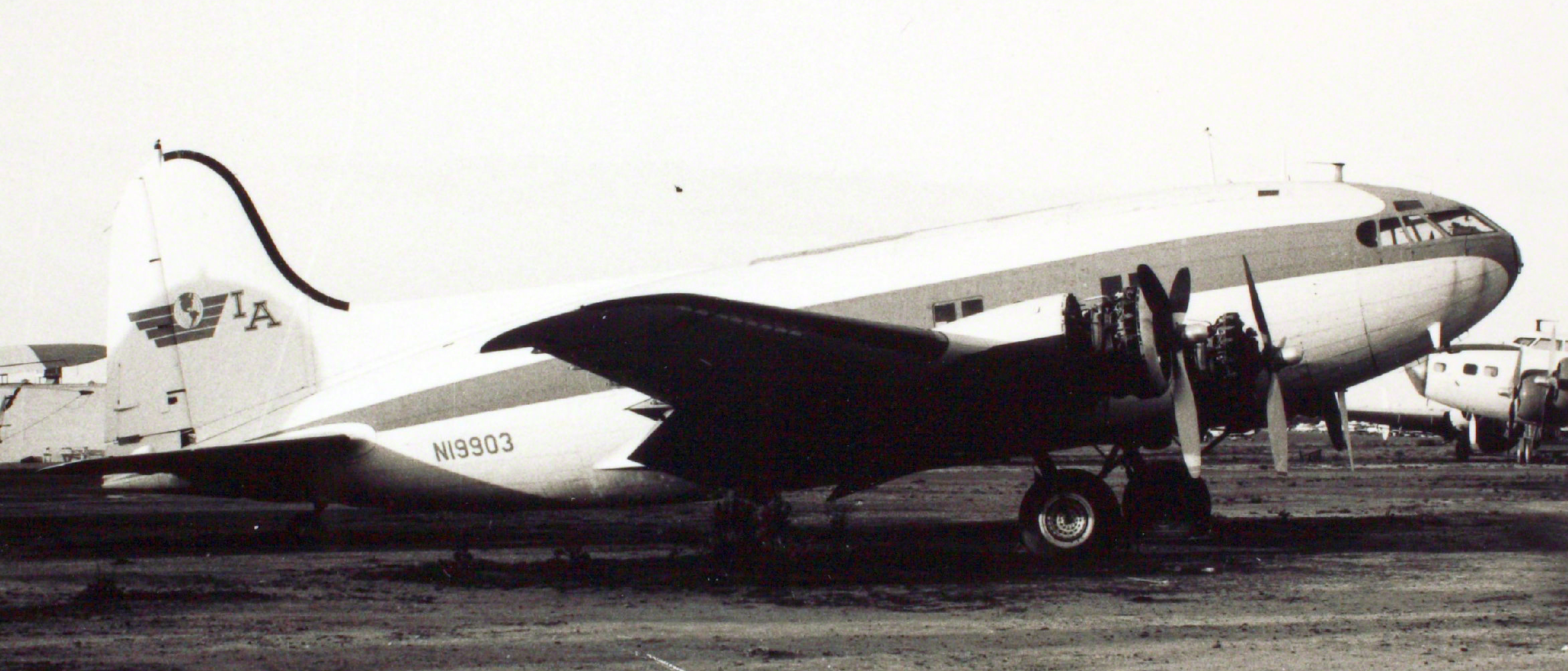
Ex-Pan Am Inter-American Inc. Boeing S-307 Strato-Clipper N19903 after returning to the US from Haiti, before being bought by the Smithsonian

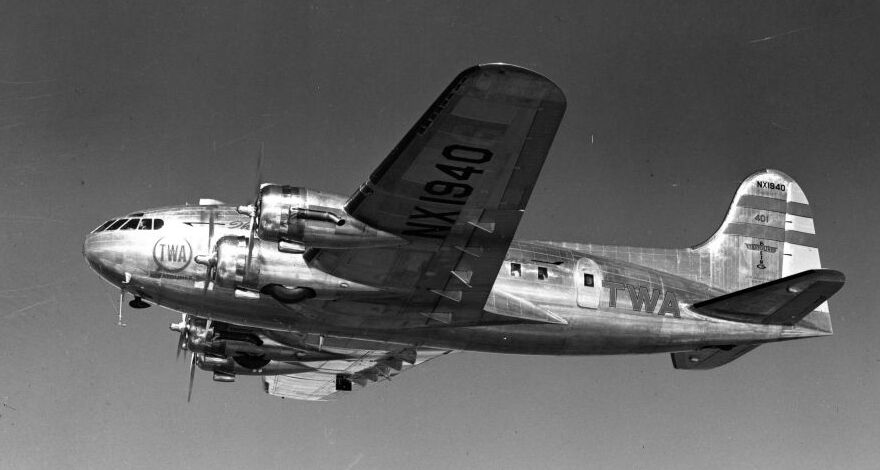
TWA Boeing SA-307B Cherokee as built

PAA-307 or S-307 Strato-Clipper
Designation for three aircraft built for Pan Am under ATC 719. Visible external differences included engine cowlings without cowl flaps. Four 1,100 hp (820 kW) Wright GR-1820-G102A Cyclone engines were fitted, with single-speed superchargers. Crew of six. Strato-Clipper was Pan Am's name for the type.
SA-307B
Designation for five aircraft built for TWA under ATC 726. These differed externally from the Pan Am aircraft in having large external flap actuators. Four 1,100 hp (820 kW) Wright GR-1820-G105A Cyclone engines were fitted, with two-speed superchargers. Crew of five.
SB-307B
Designation for one uncertified aircraft built for Howard Hughes.
C-75
Five Trans World SA-307Bs were impressed into the USAAF. The cabin pressurization was removed to save weight and the external flap actuators replaced.
SA-307B-1
The C-75s were overhauled and updated with modified B-17G wings (with 307 wing slots) and larger tailplanes mounted further aft. 1,200 hp (890 kW) Wright GR-1820-G205A Cyclone engines were fitted, along with B-29 electrical systems.
307C
50-passenger development with more powerful versions of the same Cyclone engines, boosted to 1,350 hp (1,010 kW). Boeing wanted $267,230 + 13,000 per engine (or $319,230 (Note: equivalent to $5,838,469 in 2025)) but development was cancelled in favour of the 377 Stratocruiser, based on the B-29.
316
Airliner project developed from the XB-15 with pressurized cabin similar to that used on the Stratoliners, offered to KLM as a larger Stratoliner but not followed through with.
322
Development of 307 with similar fuselage but with a mid-mounted wing and a nosewheel, as a bomber. Eventually evolved into the B-29.

== Operational history ==
Ten 307s were built. NC19906 was temporarily marked as NX1940 and NC1940 for publicity purposes.

C/N	Registration	Delivery Customer	Model	Names (fleet number)	Other identities
1994	NX19901	none	S-307	none	none
1995	NC19902	Pan American Airways	S-307	Clipper Rainbow	F-BHHR, XW-TAC
1996	NC19905	Transcontinental & Western Air	SA-307B/after 1944 SA-307B-1	Comanche (400)	42-88624/288624, F-BELV, XW-TAA
1997	NX19904	Howard Hughes	SB-307B	The "Flying Penthouse", Shamrock	NC19904
1998	NC19906	Transcontinental & Western Air	SA-307B/after 1944 SA-307B-1	Cherokee (401)	42-88623/288623, NX1940, NC1940, F-BELU, XW-TFP
1999	NC19907	Transcontinental & Western Air	SA-307B/after 1944 SA-307B-1	Zuni (402)	42-88625/288625, F-BELX, XW-TAB, XW-TFR
2000	NC19908	Transcontinental & Western Air	SA-307B/after 1944 SA-307B-1	Apache (403)	42-88626/288626, F-BELY, XW-PGR
2001	NC19909	Transcontinental & Western Air	SA-307B/after 1944 SA-307B-1	Navajo (404)	288627, F-BELZ
2002	NC19910	Pan American Airways	S-307	Clipper Comet, Quito	HC 004, N75385
2003	NC19903	Pan American Airways	S-307	Clipper Flying Cloud	2003, N9307R, N19903

=== Prototype ===
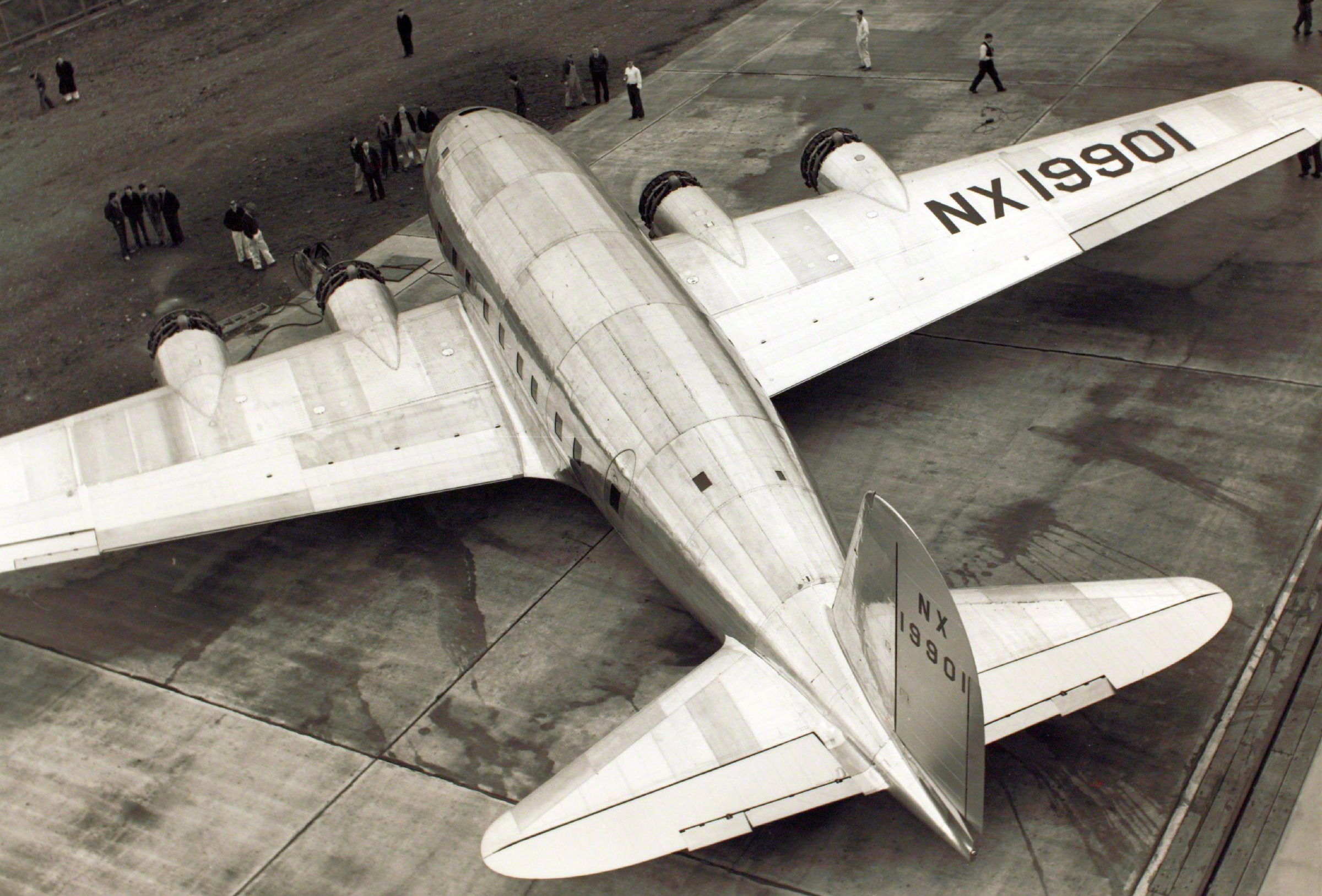
Boeing 307 prototype from above, showing the wing and tail planform

The first Boeing 307 Stratoliner, serial 1994, registration NX19901, made its first flight from Boeing Field, near Seattle, on December 31, 1938, prior to its intended delivery to Pan Am following testing and certification. As related above, it crashed on a test flight on March 18, 1939, killing all ten occupants, and forced several design changes, of which the fin and rudder are the most immediately obvious.

=== Koninklijke Luchtvaart Maatschappij N.V. (KLM) ===
KLM was considering four-engine airliners for the European routes and a longer-ranged four-engine aircraft for their routes to the Netherlands East Indies (now Indonesia). Aircraft considered included the Douglas DC-4(E), the Boeing 307, the Junkers Ju 90, the Focke-Wulf Fw 200 Condor, and the Bloch 160, of which only the DC-4 and 307 came close to meeting requirements.

Boeing made a proposal to KLM on September 20, 1936, for an exclusive option on 10 certified 307s for $2.4 million (Note: equivalent to $55,683,453 in 2025) with options for 18 aircraft and with first delivery in 14 months. By January 14, 1937, the price had increased for 18 aircraft to $265,000 each, not including pressurization equipment. KLM let Boeing know that they were interested in four aircraft, for use as an interim measure pending a larger, more suitable design, and that they would use it for familiarization training with four-engine aircraft. They required that it fly on just two engines, use Pratt & Whitney automatic mixture controls, have a 2,500 mi (4,000 km) range, be able to carry freight or mail, and have moderate tire ground pressure. KLM then requested a quote for three 307s, with either Wright Cyclones or Pratt & Whitney 1830 engines, fitted with constant-speed propellers and automatic carburettor mixture control and with additional fuel capacity to provide a range of 3,400 mi (5,500 km). Boeing responded that the price for three aircraft would be $289,000 each if fitted with Cyclone engines and $314,000 if fitted with R-1830s, plus $3,100–$4,000 per aircraft to increase fuel capacity to either 1,700 US gal (6,400 L; 1,400 imp gal) or 2,125 US gal (8,040 L; 1,769 imp gal), provided that the US Government gave permission to export the engines. After not hearing back, Boeing sent a new quote to KLM for $300,000 per aircraft, or $320,000 for the pressurized version. December 20, 1938, the KLM board made the decision to order two four-engine aircraft, with consideration of the Boeing 307 and Focke Wulf Fw 200 Condor; however, the Condor was not suitable for the East Indies route.

Following TWA defaulting on payments, the first three TWA aircraft were offered to KLM in late 1939, but a quick decision was needed by Saturday, March 18, 1939. KLM was unable to make that decision before the offer expired and requested an extension. On March 21, 1939, KLM confirmed that they still planned to buy 307s and insisted that they were content with Boeing's progress. Ultimately, though, KLM did not buy the 307s because their representatives' test-flight insurance coverage was rejected, and KLM found Boeing's response to providing for the next of kin unsatisfactory, a disagreement that was not cleared up until after World War II. The insurance coverage on the aircraft was sufficiently large that it had the insurance industry worried about fallout, and, as was the norm at the time, neither passengers nor crew could get coverage from any insurance company, but the aircraft itself was covered for a replacement cost of $500,000, with hull coverage and passenger liability, carried by Aero Insurance Underwriters and Associated Aviation Underwriters, despite the fact that Boeing was offering to sell the aircraft to KLM for much less than that.

=== Australian National Airways (ANA) ===
Another company that Boeing was in discussions with was Australian National Airways, who they quoted $310,000 per Stratoliner, or $340,000 for a pressurized version, on July 27, 1938, but nothing came of these discussions and ANA never operated the type.

=== Howard Hughes and Cosmic Muffin ===
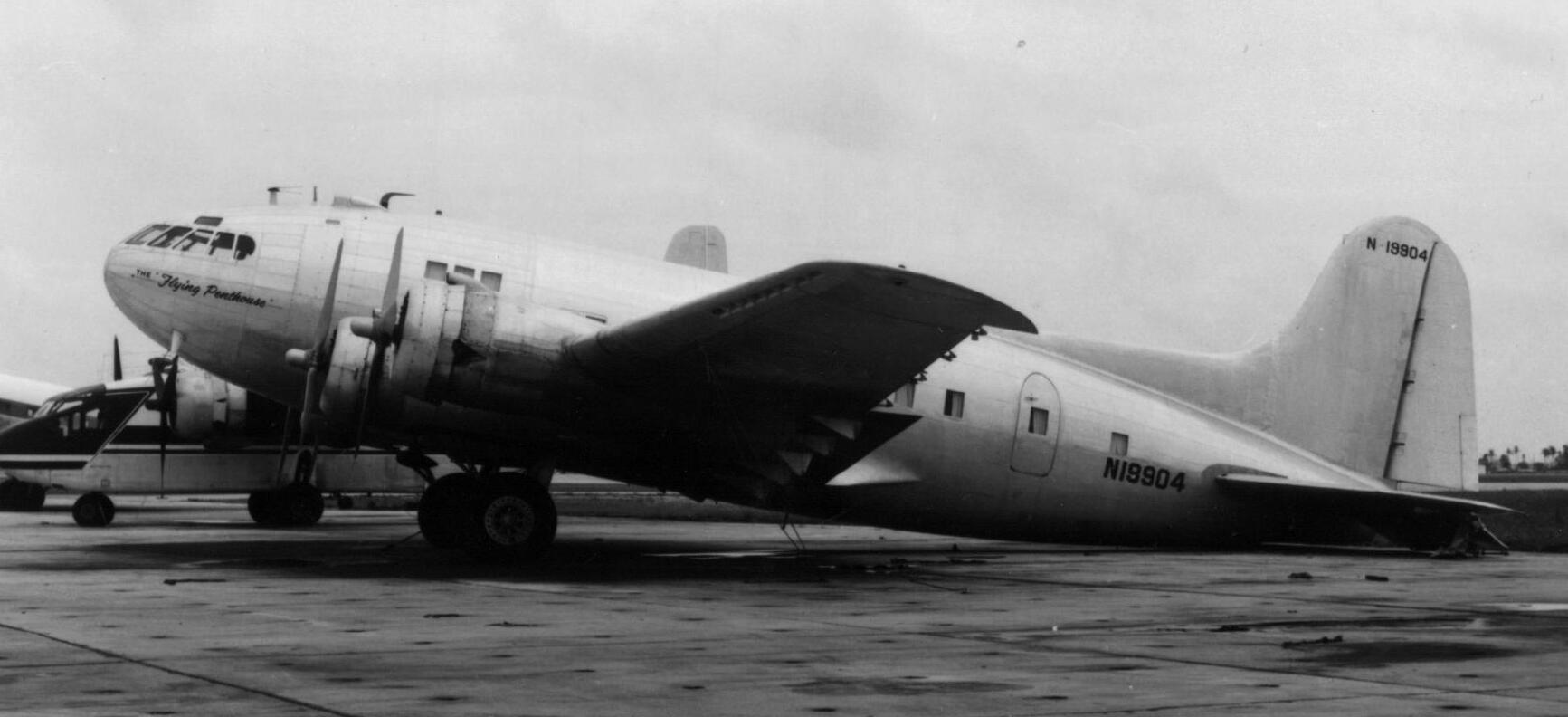
Howard Hughes's SB-307B after conversion into The "Flying Penthouse"

The first customer delivery was to millionaire Howard Hughes on July 13, 1939. He bought aircraft serial number 1997, registered as NX19904, for $315,000 (Note: equivalent to $7,290,969 in 2025) for a round-the-world flight, hoping to break his own record of 91 hours 14 minutes set between July 10 and 14 in 1938 in a Lockheed Model 14 Super Electra. Hughes' Stratoliner was fitted with extra fuel tanks and was ready for the first leg of the round-the-world attempt when Nazi Germany invaded Poland on September 1, 1939, causing the attempt to be cancelled. Hughes' aircraft was stored in Glendale, California for the duration of the war, prior to being converted into a flying condo. Hughes had the extra fuel tanks removed and, for around $250,000, (Note: equivalent to $4,127,560 in 2025) had it fitted with much more powerful Wright R-2600 engines for its transformation into "The Flying Penthouse", which included a bedroom, two bathrooms, a galley, and a bar as well as a living room. In 1949, Hughes spent an additional $100,000 (Note: equivalent to $1,353,147 in 2025) renovating it so he could sell it, which, like the TWA and Pan Am aircraft, then included an interior designed by Raymond Loewy. Oil tycoon Glenn McCarthy bought it to coincide with the opening of his new Shamrock Hotel, renamed it Shamrock, and had it repainted; however, McCarthy defaulted on payments and it was returned to Hughes. It languished unflown until August 1965, when it was damaged beyond repair by Hurricane Cleo, with only about 500 hours on the airframe. It was then bought for $69 by Kenneth W. London, who cut the damaged wings and tail off, built a hull under it, and installed a pair of V-8 engines to convert it into a houseboat which he named Londonaire. After various repossessions, deaths, and failed sales, it became the Cosmic Muffin, in which form it survives.

=== Transcontinental & Western Air (TWA) ===
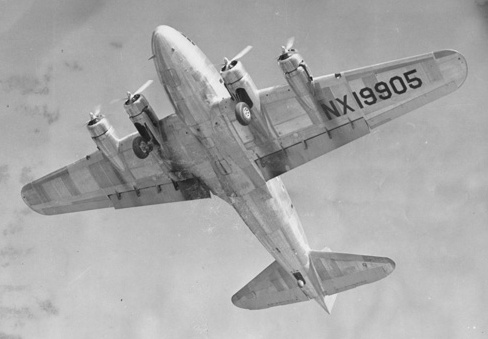
TWA Boeing SA-307B NC19905, Comanche underside, showing the 11.5 ft (3.5 m) fuselage width. The external arms for the slotted flaps are visible, as are the hatches on the underside providing access to the baggage hold.

As one of the companies sponsoring the development of the Douglas DC-4, Transcontinental & Western Air lost interest due to delays and poor performance, but the agreement they signed with Douglas limited the maximum weight of any replacement design to 43,000 lb (20,000 kg). After discussing their needs with Boeing, TWA signed a contract with Boeing to buy six 307s with an option for 13 more for $1,590,000 on January 29, 1937, with deliveries to be made in mid-1938. TWA defaulted on their payments, though, and the TWA markings which had already been applied to their airframes were removed. TWA filed a lawsuit against Boeing for default of contract, and Boeing sued TWA for breach of contract over the non-payment. Hughes had begun secretly buying up TWA shares and, by March 1939, Hughes had a controlling interest in Trans-World Airlines (or TWA, as it was rebranded once he had taken over), with roughly 46% of the shares. By August 1939, TWA and Boeing had resumed negotiations, and TWA would get five 307s, and Hughes would get one. The cost to TWA had risen and was then $1,750,000, (Note: equivalent to $41,095,267 in 2025) or $350,000 (Note: equivalent to $41,095,267 in 2025) per aircraft – three times the cost for Douglas DC-3s. In early 1940, Hughes bought up all remaining outstanding TWA shares not otherwise reserved for employees.

TWA received its first Stratoliner on May 6, 1940, and the last of their five was delivered on June 4, 1940. It was not their first four-engine airliner, as one of their parent companies, Western Air Express, had operated the Fokker F-32. All five were named in TWA promotional material for North American Indigenous tribes – names that would be used throughout their careers, continuing long after they left TWA. War intervened in December 1941, and civil aircraft production was halted, preventing any further deliveries. The date chosen for TWA's first service flight was July 8, 1940, to coincide with the anniversary of TAT's 48-hour coast-to-coast service, in which trains were used for night legs. TWA's Stratoliners flew between Los Angeles and New York, making three stops.

TWA's Burbank–La Guardia flight via Chicago was two hours quicker than with a DC-3 (13:40 east and 15:38 west) with three stops in each direction. The main route was La Guardia, New York, to Chicago, Illinois, to Kansas City, Missouri, to Albuquerque, New Mexico, to Burbank, California, and the reverse.

1940 was the best year for TWA, with a 50% increase in passenger traffic over 1939, but they were still running exclusively in the red.

On September 9, 1940, a TWA Stratoliner from Chicago to New York set a commercial speed record flying the 778 mi (1,252 km) in two hours and fifty-two minutes at an average speed of 271.4 mph (436.8 km/h). A few weeks later, on September 26, a TWA Stratoliner bound for New York, at 17,000 ft (5,200 m), with a jetstream providing a strong tailwind, reached a ground speed of 387 mph (623 km/h).

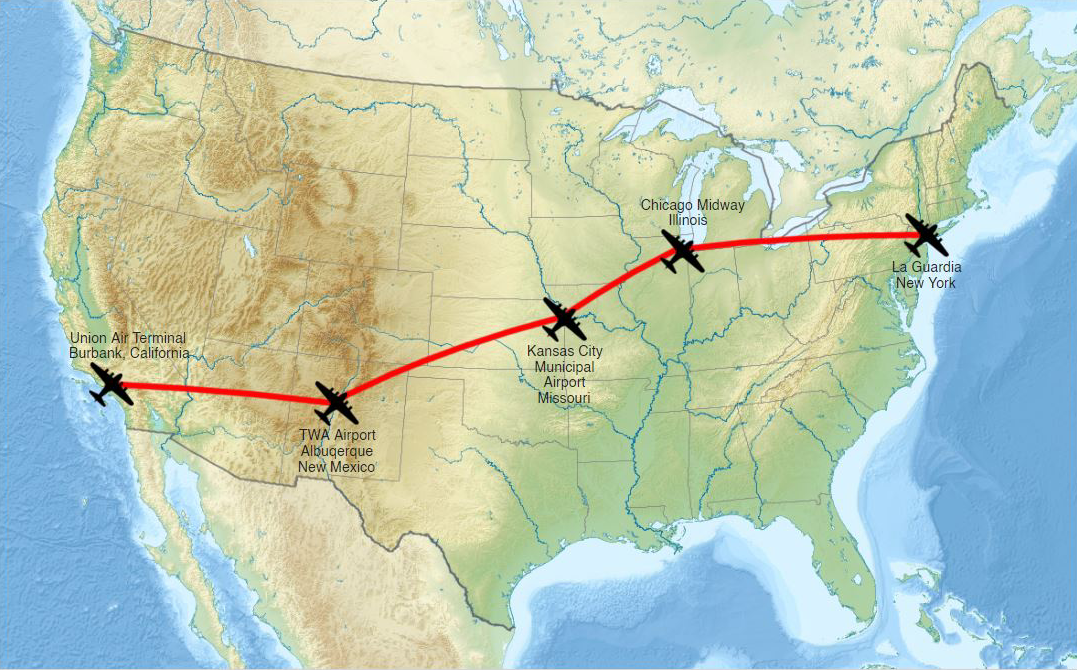
Map of 1940 TWA Boeing 307 routes

1940 TWA Boeing 307 routes and fares
Flight No.	Route	Route name	Price (one way)	Price (return)	Sleeper surcharge
7	New York to Burbank (via CHI, MKC and ABQ)	Super Sky Chief	$149.95 (Note: One-way airfare equivalent to $3,446.00 in 2025)	$269.90 (Note: Return airfare equivalent to $6,202.57 in 2025)	$119.95 (Note: Sleeper surcharge equivalent to $2,756.57 in 2025)
8	Burbank to New York (via ABQ, MKC and CHI)	Super Sky Chief	$149.95	$269.90	$119.95
40	Kansas City to New York (via Chicago)	Times Square (Note: Daytime flights only)	$66.45 (Note: One-way airfare equivalent to $1,527.09 in 2025)	$119.60 (Note: Return airfare equivalent to $2,748.53 in 2025)	$8.80 (Note: Sleeper surcharge equivalent to $202.23 in 2025)
41	New York to Chicago (non-stop)	Times Square	$44.95 (Note: One-way airfare equivalent to $1,033.00 in 2025)	$80.90 (Note: Return airfare equivalent to $1,859.16 in 2025)	$5.60 (Note: Sleeper surcharge equivalent to $128.69 in 2025)
42	Chicago to New York (non-stop)	Sky Century	$44.95	$80.90	$5.60
45	New York to Kansas City (via Chicago)	Star Duster	$66.45	$119.60	$8.80

Flight 45 added stops at Philadelphia and Pittsburgh on December 1, 1940.

==== TWA ICD Wartime operations ====
C/N	Old TWA registration	Name	USAAF serial	Also marked as
1996	NC19905	Comanche	42-88624	288624
1998	NC19906	Cherokee	42-88623	288623
1999	NC19907	Zuni	42-88625	288625
2000	NC19908	Apache	42-88626	288626
2001	NC19909	Navajo	42-88627	288627

On December 14, 1941, representatives from various airlines as well as the Air Transport Association of America (ATA) met with Colonel Robert Olds of the Air Corps Ferrying Command (later renamed Air Transport Command) over the use of their airliners in wartime. Pan Am had already signed a contract on the 13th, in which it would keep its 307s but sell the 314s to the government. TWA sold all five of its 307s to the USAAF but would then operate them on behalf of the USAAF on a cost-plus basis through a new subsidiary. At the time the Stratoliner was the only available landplane transport capable of transatlantic flights with any payload. Seaplanes were too slow and not numerous enough, while the Douglas C-54 Skymaster would not enter service until March 1942 and took months to be available in any numbers. Aside from a few ad-hoc conversions from Consolidated B-24 Liberator bombers, the Consolidated C-87 Liberator Express would not be ready until September 1942, and the Lockheed C-69 Constellation would not fly until January 1943, while two-engine aircraft were considered unsafe for ocean crossings with VIPs aboard.

On the entry of the United States into World War II, Pan Am continued operating its Stratoliners on routes to Central and South America, but under direction of the Army Air Forces' Air Transport Command. All five TWA Stratoliners were withdrawn from operations on December 24, 1941, while TWA created a subsidiary, the Intercontinental Division (ICD), whose civilian crews would operate them on behalf of the United States Army Air Forces. Otis Bryan was made head of the ICD. The Stratoliners were sold to the USAAF, who assigned the type the C-75 designation, and each of them was given a USAAF serial number. The first of these was accepted by the USAAF on March 1, 1941, and the last on December 17, 1942. ICD crews included pilots, first & second officers, navigators, flight engineers, flight radio operators, and pursers. ICD Supervisor pilots and captains were paid $1100/month, (Note: equivalent to $24,078 in 2025) first officers $800/month, (Note: equivalent to $17,511 in 2025) Navigators $600/month, (Note: equivalent to $13,133 in 2025) Flight Engineers (FEs) $500/month, (Note: equivalent to $10,945 in 2025) and Flight Radio Operators (FROs) $400/month. (Note: equivalent to $8,756 in 2025) Personnel were issued USAAF uniforms, which they wore with rank stripes (two solid stripes for a captain) but with civilian insignia.

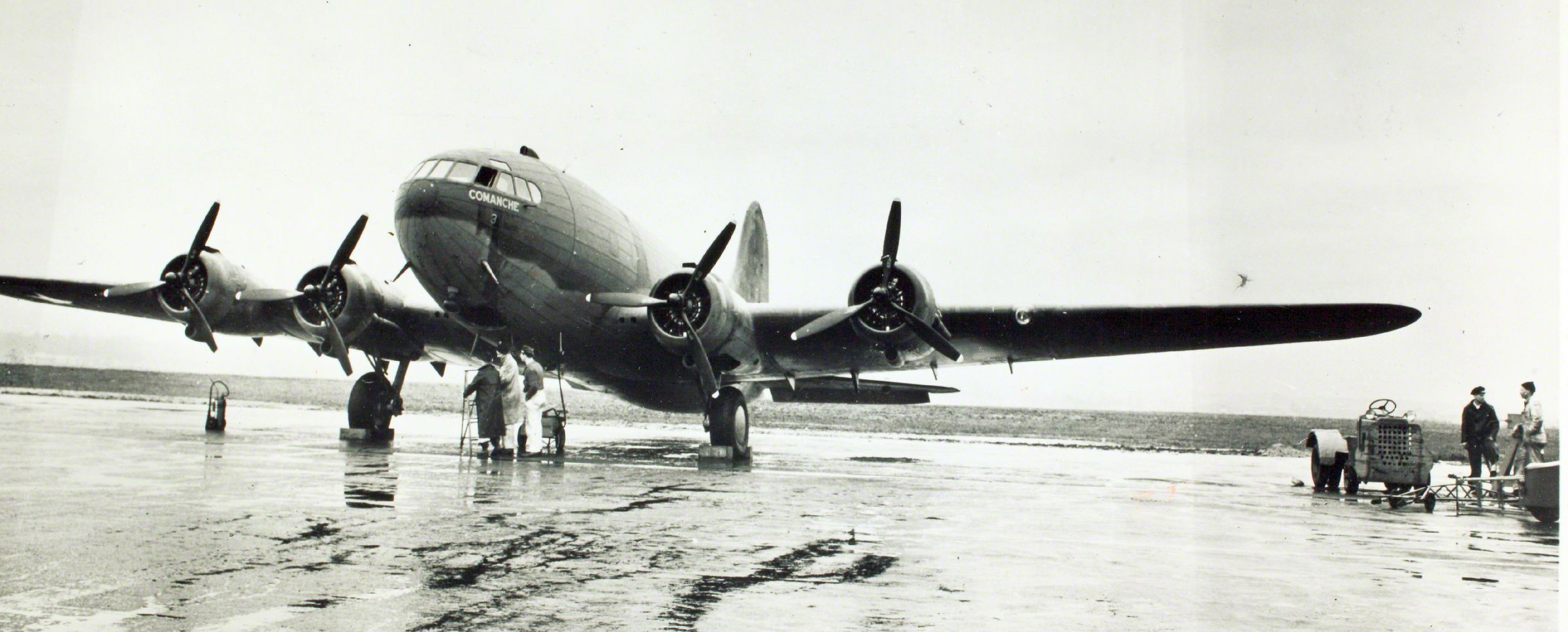
USAAF C-75 42-88624 Comanche in wartime camouflage

ICD service began on February 26, when a 307 flew south to Brazil from Washington, before crossing the South Atlantic to Africa, and north to Cairo, before continuing on to Prestwick, Scotland, where they arrived on April 20, 1942, having primarily carried 25,000 rounds of armour-piercing shells to British troops in Cairo, who were facing Rommel and his Afrika Corps. The ICD was initially set up at the crowded Washington Bolling Field but soon transferred all of their operations to nearby Washington National Airport. Passengers continued to be loaded at Bolling Field, after the aircraft flew the short hop from Washington National Airport.

The first North Atlantic crossing was in March 1942, when a flight from Washington to Prestwick carried senior military and government officials including the Army Chief of Staff General George C. Marshall, General Dwight D. Eisenhower (to command Operation Torch for the invasion of North Africa), Deputy Chief of Staff of Army Ground Forces General Mark W. Clark, Operation Torch Air Force liaison officer Colonel Hoyt Vandenberg, Chief of the Navy's Bureau of Aeronautics Rear Admiral John Henry Towers, who oversaw Navy aircraft procurement and training, and presidential advisors W. Averell Harriman and Harry Hopkins, who were crossing to negotiate the Lend-Lease program. From April 22, regular crossings were being made and the ICD was growing rapidly, from 71 personnel in January to 343 by April, and they were then making sixteen ocean crossings a month. Following his April 1942 raid on Tokyo, but before it had been made public, Jimmy Doolittle took a C-75 from Karachi, then in India, through Khartoum, Kano, and Accra to Robertsfield Airport, crossed the Atlantic to Natal, Brazil, and headed north to Belém and, from there, with an additional fuel stop, flew to Washington, D.C., arriving in time for the news of the raid to be made public. Many of the surviving members of the raid followed soon after in another Stratoliner.

The North Atlantic ferry route was set up with help from former Arctic explorer Colonel Bernt Balchen, who assisted with Bluie East Two and Bluie East Eight in Greenland to reduce the length of the Gander-to-Prestwick leg. The first aircraft to land at these fields, which were north of the Arctic Circle, was an ICD C-75, on April 20, 1942.

Marshall, Eisenhower, "Hap" Arnold, and Admirals King and Towers flew to London from Washington via Montreal, Gander, and Prestwick on May 23, 1942, and returned to Washington via Prestwick, Reykjavik, and Gander. On June 20, 1942, Air Corps Ferrying Command became Air Transport Command

The exiled (but not yet deposed) King Peter II of Yugoslavia was flown in July 1942 from London to Washington to meet with North American leaders, with the air–fuel mixture so lean that numerous stops could be skipped, and when the craft arrived in Washington it had been airborne for 21 hours 16 minutes through the trip.

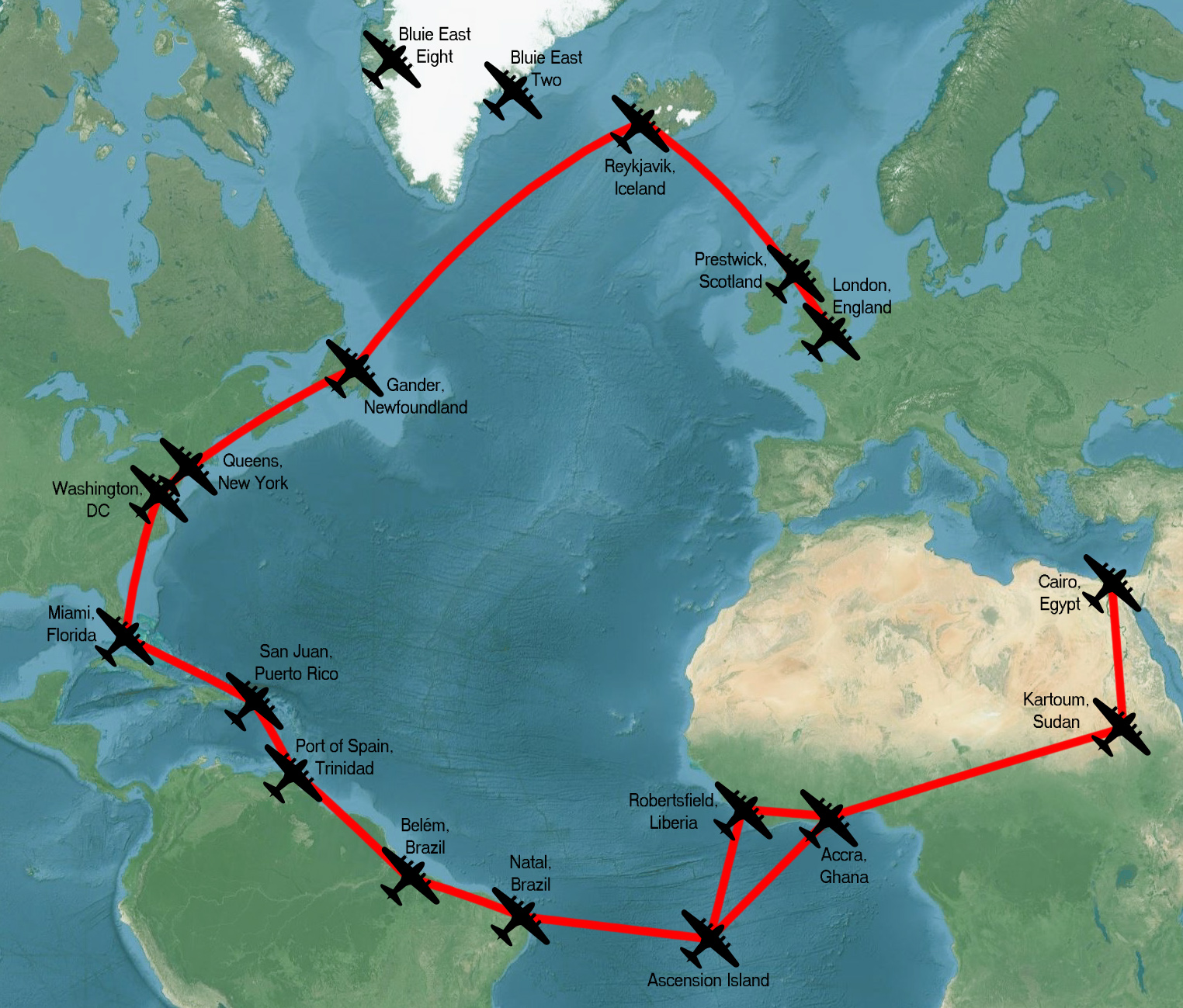
Boeing C-75 ICD primary wartime transatlantic routes after July 1942, when the airfield at Ascension Island shortened the South Atlantic crossing. Bluie Two and Eight were added in 1942 as diversionary airfields in case excessive headwinds were encountered in the North Atlantic. When conditions allowed it, usually on summer eastbound crossings, direct flights were sometimes made between Gander and Prestwick.

On July 10, 1942, Ascension Island's airfield opened in the South Atlantic, shortening the hazardous transatlantic leg enough that smaller aircraft could make the crossing, and the ICD C-75s would routinely lead flights of USAAF twin-engined aircraft, such as Douglas A-20s, across.

In November 1943, a C-75 carried Soong Mei-Ling, wife of the Chinese Nationalist warlord Chiang Kai-Shek, from Chungking to Washington to receive medical care and to negotiate military aid for China.

Two main routes were flown, between Washington, D.C., and Cairo across the South Atlantic, and between New York and Prestwick, Scotland, across the North Atlantic. They often flew non-stop the 2,122 mi (3,415 km) between Gander, Newfoundland and Prestwick, Scotland in the north, and the 2,500 mi (4,100 km) between Natal, Brazil, and Accra, Ghana, in the south. After July 1942 a refueling stop at Ascension Island was added in the South Atlantic. In the north, stops in Iceland or Greenland were often necessary when flying west against unusually strong prevailing winds. As Douglas C-54 Skymasters took over the Gander–Prestwick route, the C-75s operated between Marrakesh and Prestwick over the Atlantic.

The ICD C-75 crews crossing the Atlantic had to be careful to avoid Allied convoys and German U-boats to avoid being shot at. Cherokee, carrying returning American troops from Reykjavik to Gander at 1,000 ft (300 m), was shot at by a US Navy ship that left over 200 holes in the aircraft's tail and nearly severed the elevator controls. Many transatlantic trips were made at night so the navigators could get good star sightings.

By 1944 the USAAF had enough long-range transports that it no longer needed the small number of C-75s it had, and it sold the fleet back to TWA, with the aircraft being transferred between January 6, 1944, and December 19, 1944. On August 11, 1942, the ICD had received the first of 12 C-54s, and Pan Am would also supplement their Stratoliners with 12 C-54s. TWA received two C-54s in August and had five by September and a full allotment of 12 by November, along with the first three C-87s, to supplement the C-75s. At the same time Curtiss C-46 Commandos and Douglas C-47s and C-53s provided feeder links to the C-75s, C-54s and C-87s, as their range was inadequate for the Atlantic.

By the time they were withdrawn, over 3,000 trans-oceanic crossings had been made, and they had flown 21,284 while in USAAF service with the ICD. The sole accident occurred during a night landing at Natal when an undercarriage leg was torn off by a mound of dirt.

It cost TWA about $2 million (Note: equivalent to $36,578,450 in 2025) to have the five aircraft rebuilt by Boeing, and the first of them resumed passenger service on April 1, 1945. The CAA recertified these as SA-307B-1 civilian airliners with their original registration numbers.

==== TWA post-war service and disposal ====
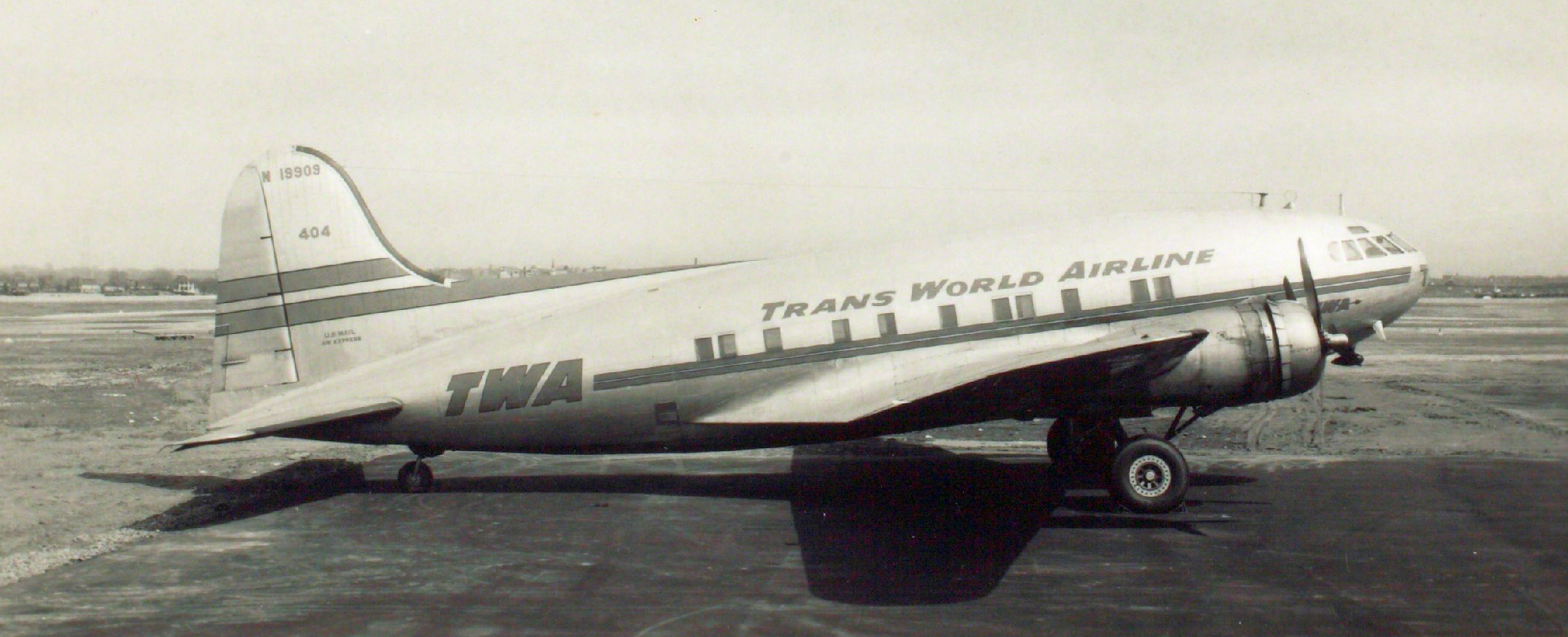
TWA Boeing SA-307B-1 N19909 Navajo, fleet number 404, as it appeared when offering coach-class seating only, showing the rearward location of the higher-aspect-ratio B-17G tailplane, whose hinges were then aligned with the rudder hinge

On April 1, 1945, the first post-war civil commercial flight was made by Zuni, as an SA-307B-1, from La Guardia to San Francisco via Pittsburgh, Saint Louis, Kansas City, Albuquerque, and Burbank, but the second transcontinental flight did not happen until a month later, when on May 1, 1945, a flight was made from Washington, DC to Spokane, Washington, via Dayton Municipal Airport, St Louis, Kansas City, Albuquerque, and Burbank, reflected a loosening of the tightly controlled government access to routes. TWA's fare structure remained the same as pre-war. New TWA flight routes were added, with routes 370 & 371, between La Guardia and Spokane through Chicago, Albuquerque, for fuel, and Burbank, and routes 48 & 49, between La Guardia and Kansas City through St Louis. At this time the TWA Stratoliner was briefly the sole four-engine commercial airliner in domestic service in the US.

On July 10, 1939, TWA had signed a contract with Lockheed to develop the Constellation, which was to be capable of 350 mph (560 km/h), compared to the Stratoliner's 246 mph (396 km/h), but, with production diverted to military for the duration of the war, the first TWA Constellations did not enter service until February 1946, and they were soon grounded, dealing with the usual teething problems encountered with a new type, from July 11 to September 20, 1946, while the Douglas DC-4s began arriving in 1946 in small numbers and, similarly, the Douglas DC-6 from 1947. In May 1949, due to strong competition from non-scheduled flights using cheaply purchased war-surplus Douglas C-54s, the Stratoliners were downgraded to a coach-only service with the fares slashed by a third. The first coach service, from New York La Guardia to Chicago via Pittsburgh, was made on June 1, 1949, with a full load of 38 passengers.

In November 1950, TWA introduced the similarly sized but cheaper-to-operate twin-engine Martin 2-0-2A on domestic routes and transferred some DC-4s from international routes to domestic service, supplementing the Stratoliners, which were mainly being used for service between La Guardia and cities in the Midwest, until TWA finally phased them out between April and July 1951. At that time the aircraft had an average of 25,205 hours flying time each, with Cherokee having the most at 26,324 hours, and they had covered 7,500,000 mi (12,100,000 km) while in ICD service.

=== Pan American Airways (Pan Am) ===
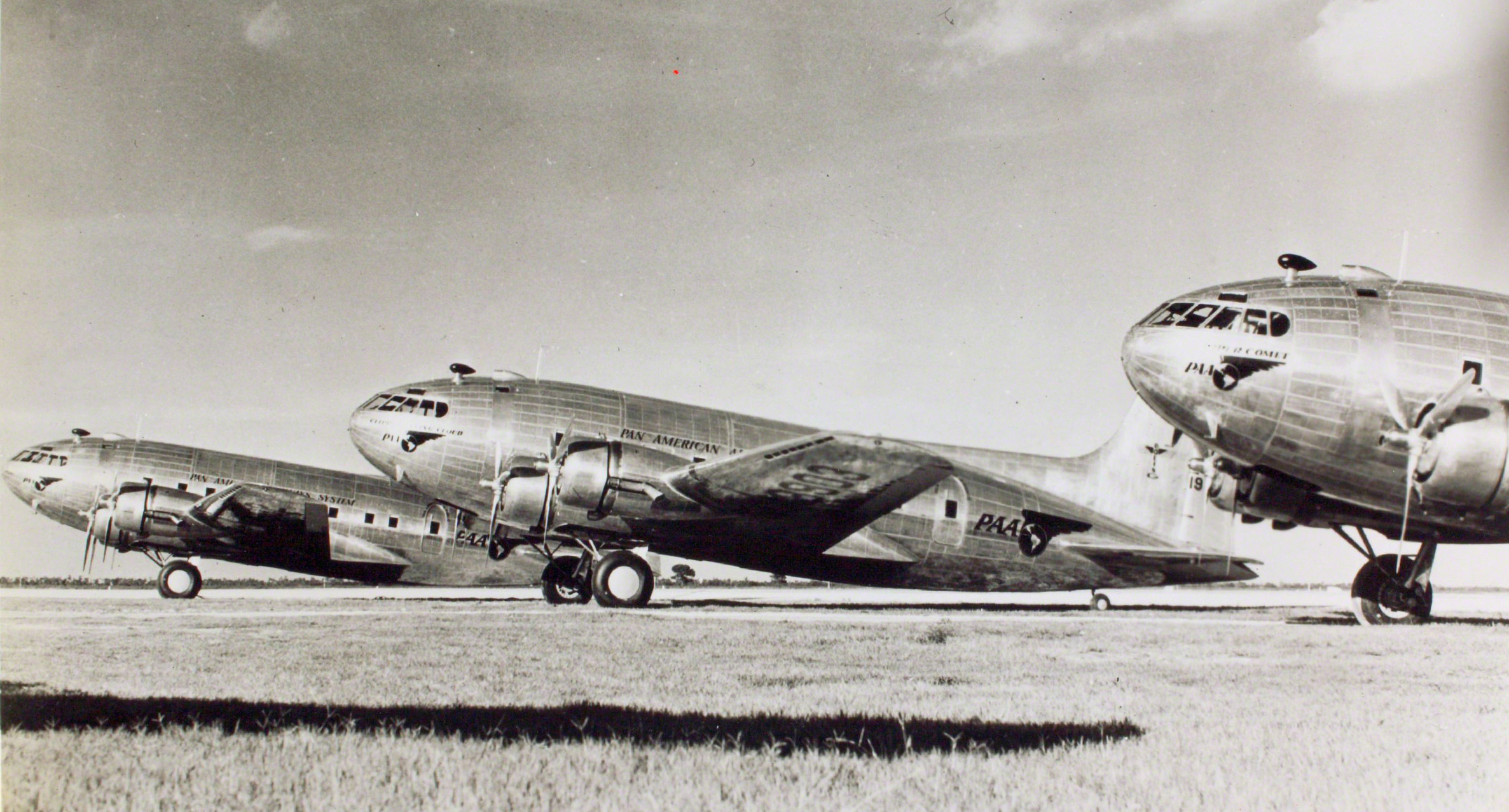
Lineup of all three Pan Am Strato-Clippers

C/N	Registration	Name	Namesake
1995	NC19902	Clipper Rainbow	Clipper ship Rainbow
2002	NC19910	Clipper Comet	Clipper ship Comet
2003	NC19903	Clipper Flying Cloud	Clipper ship Flying Cloud

In 1937 Pan American Airways placed their first order for two Stratoliners, which they soon increased to six. Deliveries to Pan Am started in March 1940, and they had received their first three before war intervened and civil aircraft production halted. The other three would not be built. All three were named for historically notable Clipper ships. Pan Am carried out their first revenue flight on July 4, 1940, with service between Miami, Brownsville, Texas, and Los Angeles. Unlike TWA, Pan Am did not exclusively assign their aircraft to specific routes, and instead they were used for their Latin American routes and ranged from Miami and Los Angeles to Brazil.

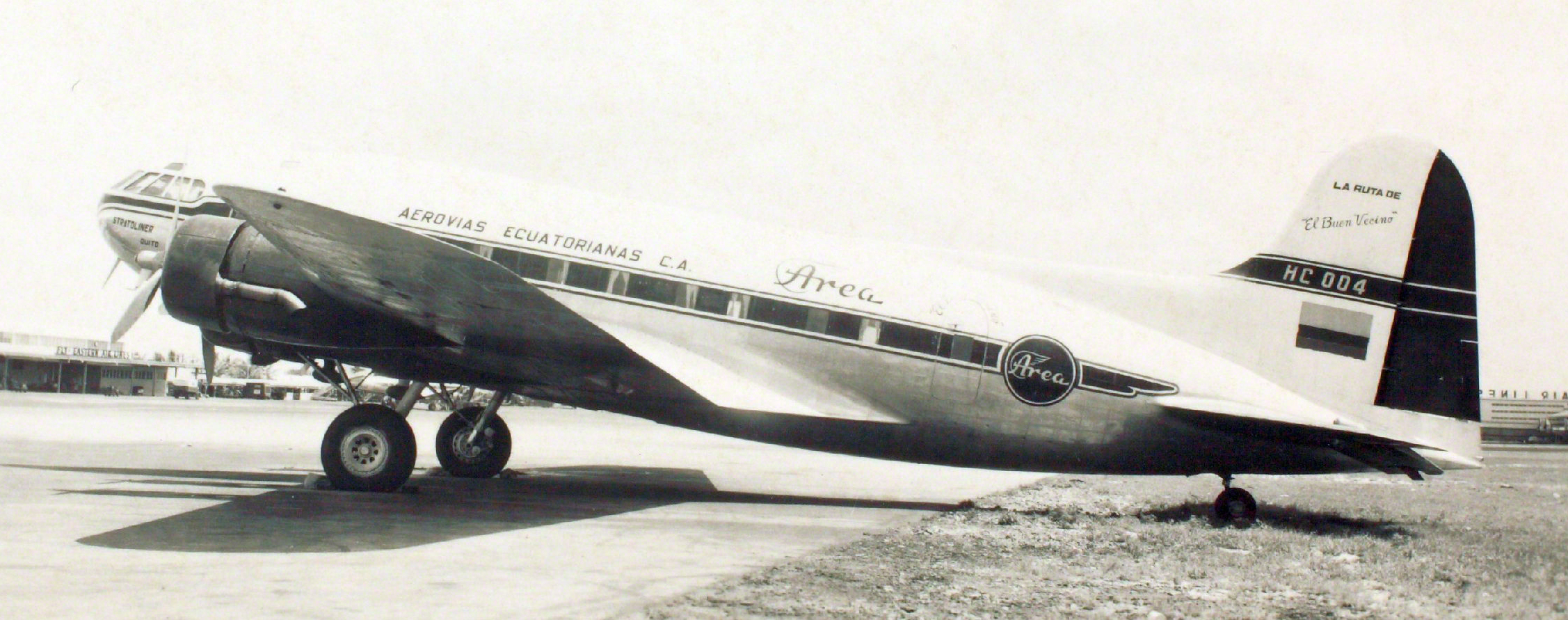
Aerovias Ecuatorianas C.A. (AREA) Boeing S-307 Strato-Clipper HC 004

When TWA's Stratoliners were getting new wings and tails, Pan Am's 307s were being modified in Miami to repair the cracked spar tubing with doublers and did not get new wings or engines; the maximum gross weight remained the same. Pan-Am flights then resumed between Miami, the Caribbean, and Belém, until all three were sold to the Airline Training Company of Miami in late 1948 and early 1949, before being sold on to other operators.

The former Clipper Comet NC19910 was sold to Aerovias Ecuatorianas (AREA) in Ecuador, in 1951, who used it as Quito with the registration HC 004 to provide service between Ecuador and Miami. From 1955, it was with Quaker City Airways for two years as N75385, making non-scheduled charter flights. On May 10, 1958, while still carrying the same registration and after having been stored for some time, it was being readied to be ferried to Boeing for modification for use as a crop duster, but flight tests were carried out despite finding fuel leaks whose source could not be determined, and with untested auxiliary fuel tanks installed in the cabin. During the flight test, it caught fire, and while the crew landed it safely on a boulder-strewn mesa and escaped unharmed, the airframe was destroyed by the fire.

The former Clipper Rainbow NC19902 was to have been sold to the short-lived Mercury Airways of South Africa and was even given the South African registration ZS-BWU. However, the sale was never completed, and, similarly, it was supposed to have been sold to Aerovias Ecuatorianas, with registration HC-SJC-003, but that sale also appears to have fallen through. In 1951 it was sold to Aigle Azur as F-BHHR.

The former Clipper Flying Cloud NC19903 was purchased by the Haitian Air Force (French: Corps d’Aviation d’Garde d’Haïti) in 1954 and assigned the number 2003, but plans to use it for a passenger service by the Compagnie Haïtienne de Transports Aériens (CoHaTA) were cancelled and it was fitted out as a presidential transport. When François "Papa Doc" Duvalier came into power in 1957 he chose not to use it and instead had the aircraft sold the same year, with the money from the sale going toward five North American T-6G Texan training aircraft. This aircraft returned to the US and, after briefly being registered as N9307R and N19903, is now restored and at the Smithsonian Museum as NC19903.

=== Aigle Azur and Union Aéromaritime de Transport ===
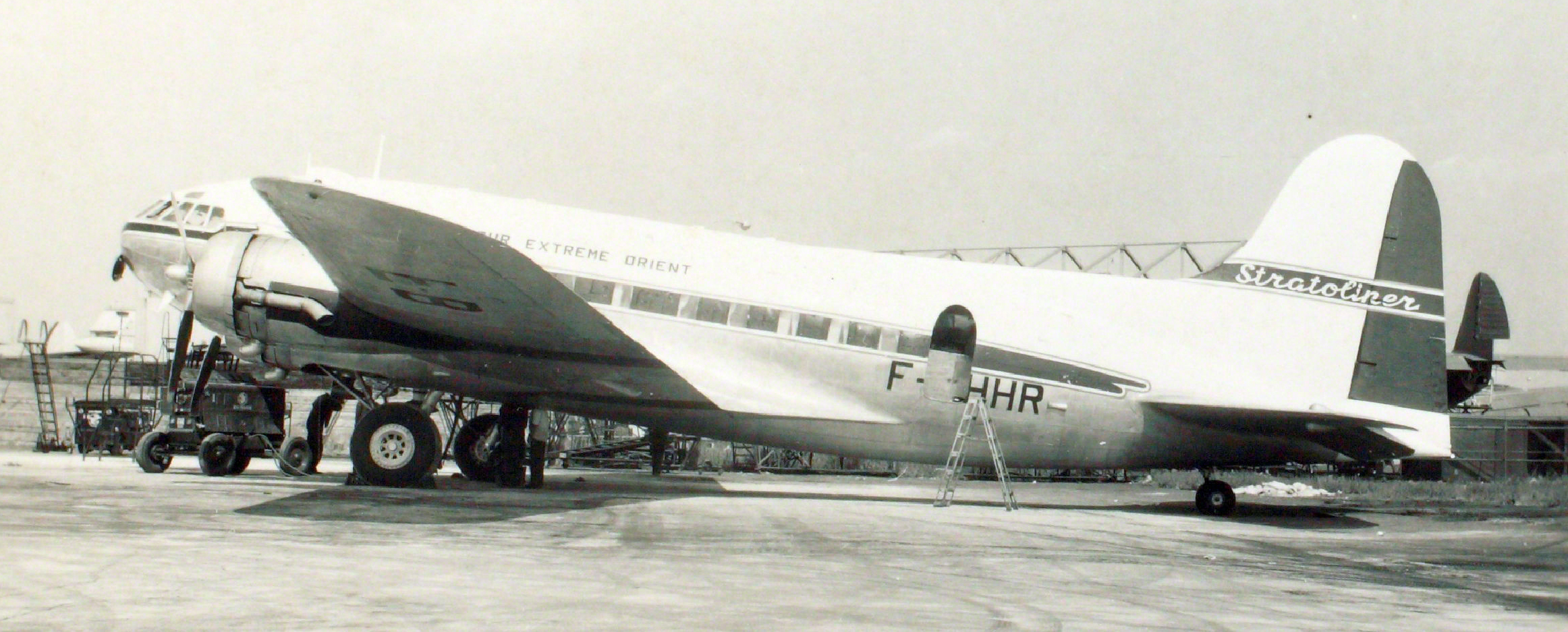
Aigle Azur Extrême-Orient Boeing S-307 Strato-Clipper F-BHHR in New York just before delivery

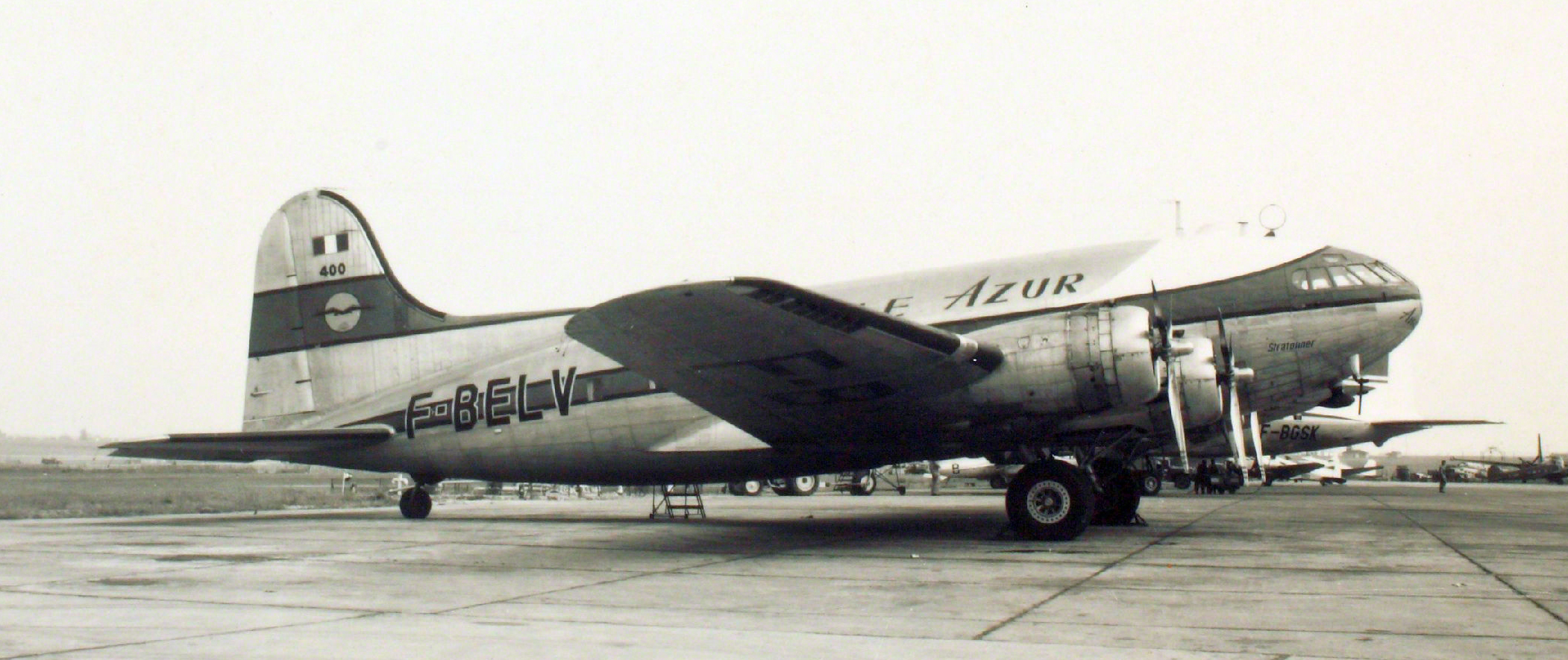
Aigle Azur Boeing SA-307B-1 F-BELV on the ramp

TWA sold all five TWA SA-307B-1s to the French operator Aigle Azur (French for Blue Eagle) in April 1951, for $525,000, (Note: equivalent to $6,512,019 in 2025) along with their remaining supply of spares. Aigle Azur received them between May 14, 1951, and December 19, 1951. The aircraft were modified for 48-passenger capacity and used on scheduled flights between Paris and French North Africa (e.g. Casablanca, Tunis), French West Africa, French Equatorial Africa, and Madagascar, and later in 1952, French Indo-China.

The Stratoliners were no longer competitive against the larger and faster Douglas DC-6 and Lockheed Constellation then entering service, which on May 1, 1955, led to Aigle Azur along with its subsidiary in Asia, Aigle Azur Indochine, being bought by Union Aéromaritime de Transport (UAT). On the same date, Aigle Azur Indochine was renamed Aigle Azur Extreme-Orient. On September 16, 1955, F-BELV, F-BELX, F-BELY, and F-BELZ were transferred from Europe to Aigle Azur Extreme-Orient, mainly for charter work. During 1955 and 1956, F-BELU and F-BELY and F-BELZ returned to Europe to be leased to Airnautic. The former Pan Am aircraft, F-BHHR, had joined Aigle Azur in 1951 and was transferred to Aigle Azur Extreme-Orient in March 1957. Aigle Azur Extrême-Orient branding was retained for several years before the aircraft were repainted in UAT Aéromaritime colors.

After four years in service in Asia, during which it was briefly leased to Air Laos Transport Aériens (later renamed Royal Air Lao) and assigned the Laotian XW registration XW-TAC, F-BHHR was destroyed in an accident on May 22, 1961, while being operated by Aigle Azur Extreme-Orient on a non-scheduled Saigon–Vientiane passenger flight, with 28 on board. It had departed from Tan Son Nhat International Airport in Saigon and was heading for Vientiane when the number four engine had to be shut down, and when it returned to land it overshot the runway in deteriorating weather and a violent squall or microburst blew it sideways, causing it to hit the ground. All 28 people on board survived but the aircraft was destroyed.

Union Aéromaritime de Transport merged with Transports Aériens Intercontinentaux to become Union de Transports Aériens (UTA) on October 1, 1963, but by then had already sold all of its Stratoliners to CITCA.

=== Airnautic ===
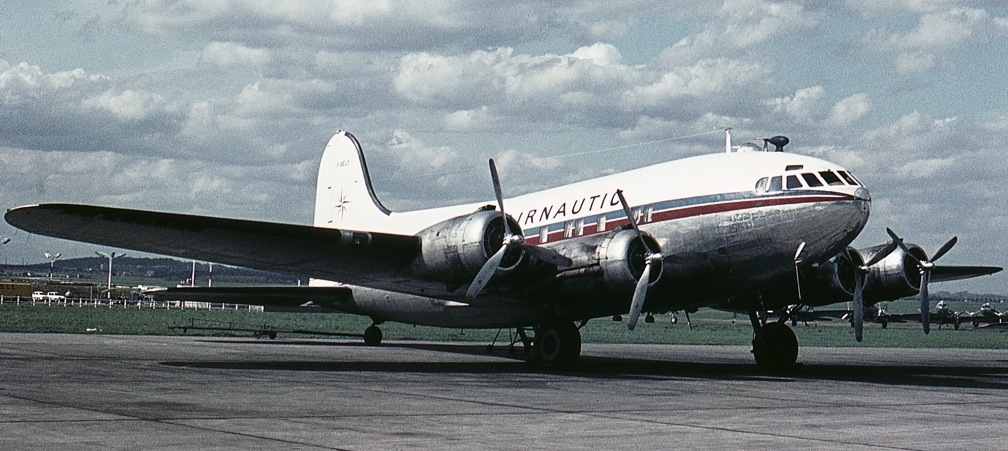
Airnautic Boeing SA-307B-1 F-BELY

Airnautic (or Air Nautic) received three ex-Aigle Azur SA-307B-1s in 1955 and 1956 including F-BELU, F-BELY, and F-BELZ, which were operated in southern Europe around the Mediterranean providing charter flights, especially around Corsica.

On December 29, 1962, F-BELZ collided with a mountain while on a charter flight with 22 basketball players and fans while flying from Bastia to Ajaccio, on the island of Corsica. It was flying at an altitude of about 7,500 ft (2,300 m), despite having been cleared for 12,000 ft (3,700 m), and at 12:12 pm slammed into a sheer rock face just 165 ft (50 m) from the peak, before falling about 300 ft (100 m) down the side of the mountain.

In 1965, F-BELY and F-BELU were returned to CITCA, who then leased them to other operators.

Air France became the principal shareholder of Airnautic in 1962, at which time it purchased DC-6s, and in 1966 Airnautic ceased to exist, having been absorbed into Air France.

=== Compagnie Internationale de Transports Civil Aériens (CITCA) ===
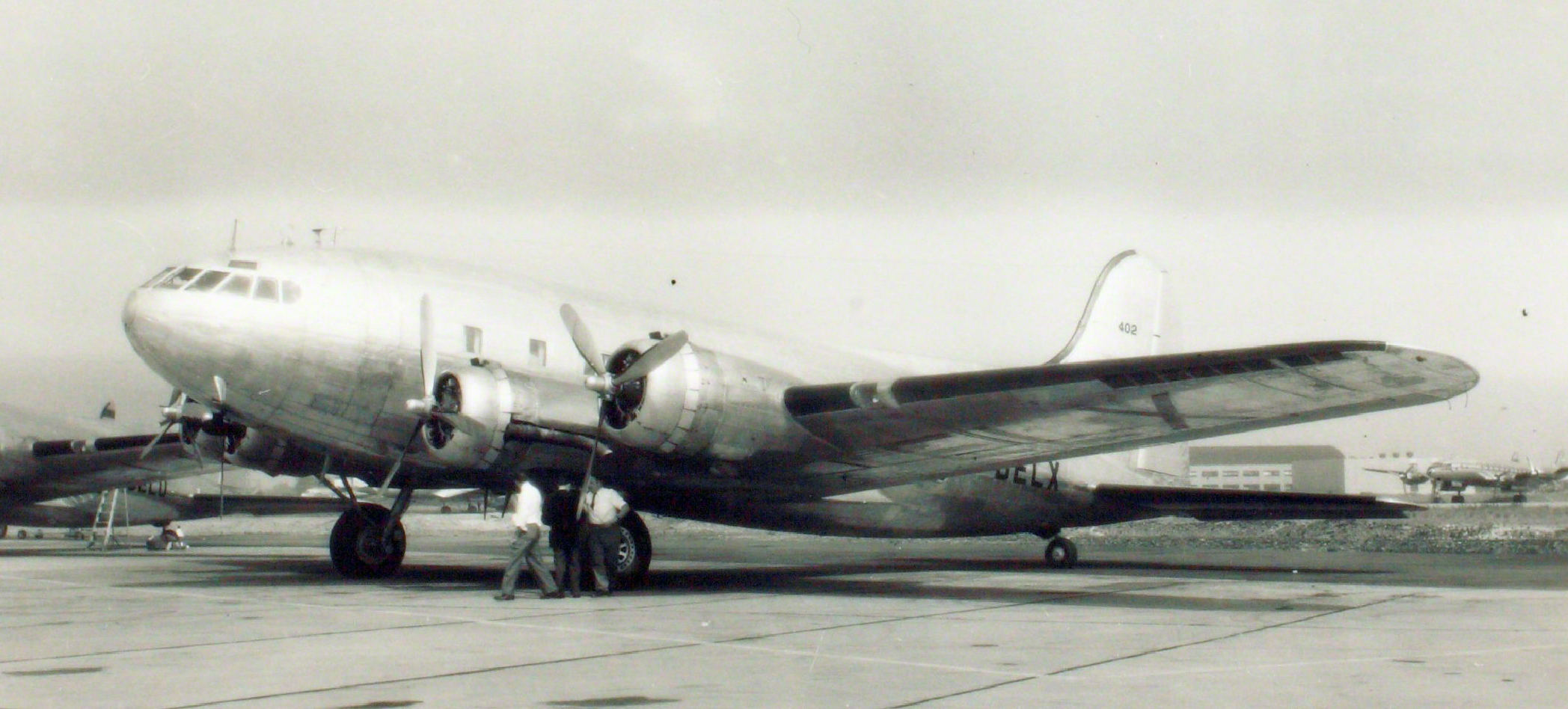
Boeing SA-307B-1 Stratoliner F-BELX, likely while with Cambodia Air Commercial

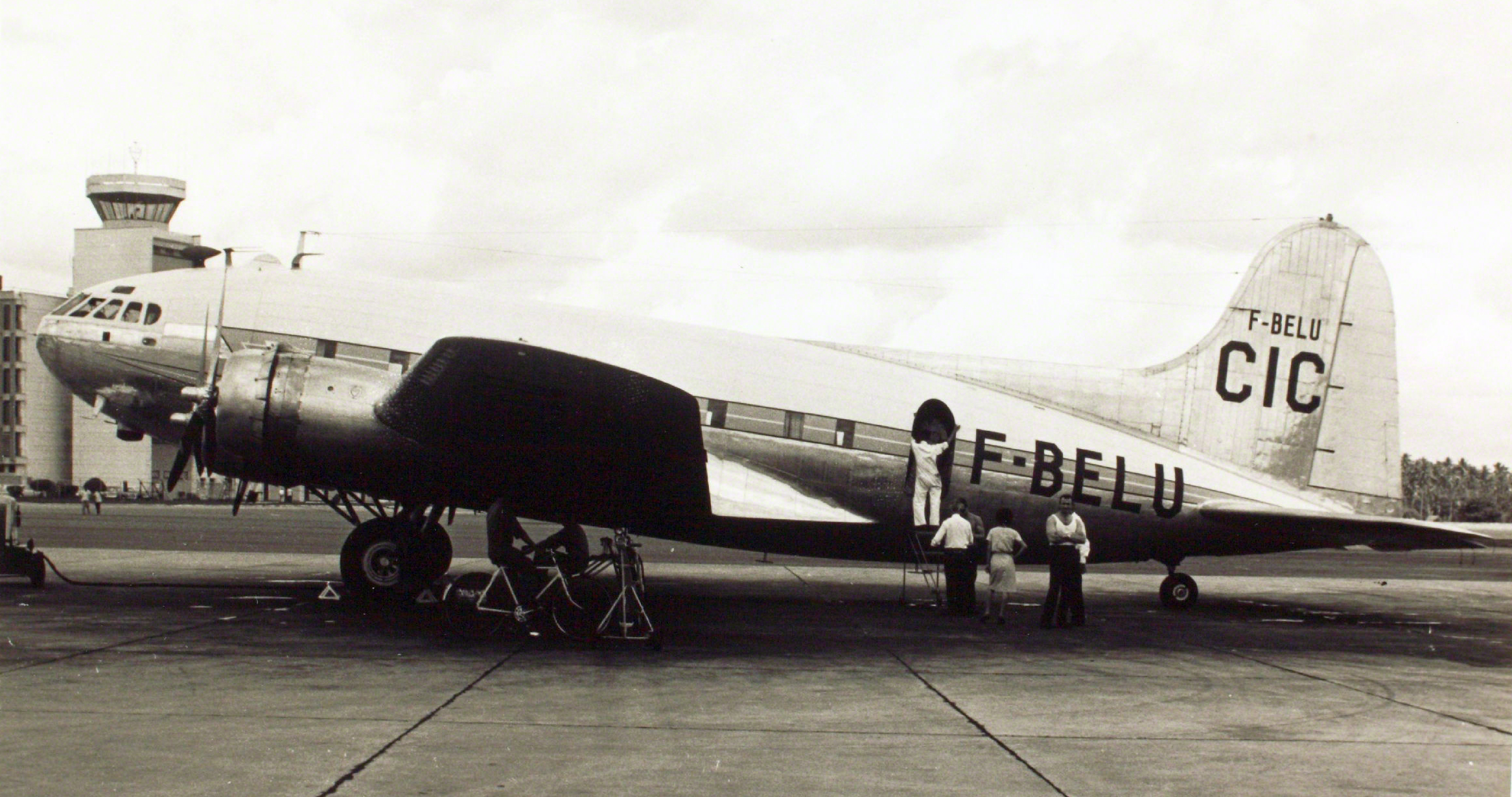
SA-307B-1 F-BELU with the CIC/ICC

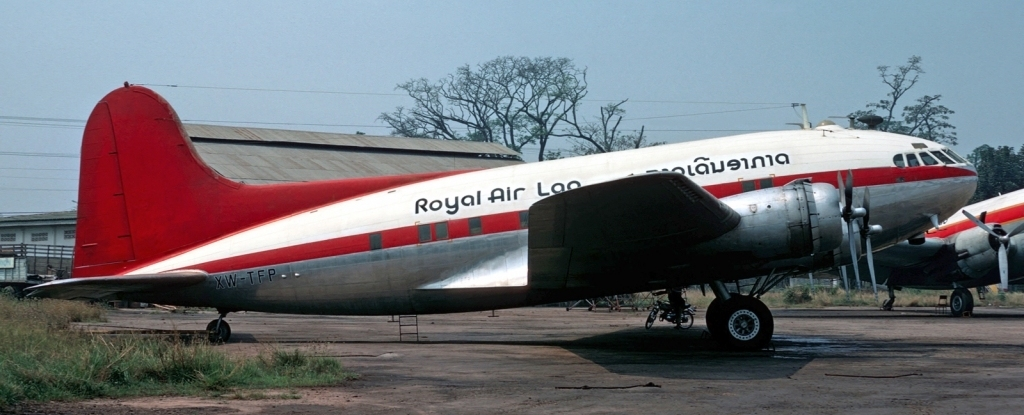
Royal Air Lao SA-307B-1 XW-TFP two days before ditching in the Mekong river

Compagnie Internationale de Transports Civil Aériens (CITCA) bought five Stratoliners, F-BELU, F-BELV, F-BELX, F-BELY, and F-BELZ, which were leased out to other operators.

In 1965, Cambodia Air Commercial leased F-BELY as XW-PGR, and F-BELU as XW-TFP, before both went to Royal Air Lao the same year, which then leased all five of the CITCA Stratoliners, which were also assigned Laotian XW registrations, and F-BELV became XW-TAA and F-BELX XW-TFR. The Air Laos Transport Aériens and Royal Air Lao Stratoliners were flown between Vientiane and Hong Kong with a large detour around North Vietnam. Royal Air Laos was operating XW-TFP and XW-PGR when they were destroyed in accidents, while F-BELV would be leased to Royal Air Cambodge.

On February 27, 1971, XW-PGR collided with a Lao Air Force Douglas C-47 while landing at Luang Prabang, Laos, and damage to the left wing was irreparable due to a lack of spares.

The International Control Commission (ICC; French: Commission Internationale de Contrôle, or CIC) and its successor, International Commission of Control and Supervision, leased three aircraft in 1964 under their old French registrations of F-BELV, F-BELU, and F-BELX, which then had seating for as many as 60 and were used to provide what were often hazardous diplomatic flights around South-East Asia until 1974, when it suspended operations with the impending defeat of US forces in Vietnam. They were flown under diplomatic immunity along specially delineated 20 mi (32 km) wide corridors between Saigon in South Vietnam, Vientiane in Laos, Phnom Penh in Cambodia, and Hanoi in North Vietnam. Passengers were usually diplomats, members of the Red Cross, press, businessmen, and Control Commission officials.

When F-BELV disappeared on October 18, 1965, it was flying from Vientiane-Wattay Airport in Laos to the Gia Lam Airport (Hanoi), in Vietnam, and was supposed to have been cleared to fly at 11,800 ft (3,600 m) and 165 kn (190 mph; 306 km/h). On this flight there were five CIC delegates from India, three from Canada, and one from Poland, as well as four French crew members, and all passengers and crew died. Due to radio interference a message indicating that their clearance period had been delayed was never received. Poor communications meant it took around 19 hours before anyone realized the aircraft had gone missing as the destination airport had assumed it had returned to its point of origin, and that airport was unaware it had not arrived at its destination. The search for the downed aircraft was delayed further due to the need to negotiate access to the likely crash area, with several warring parties wary from previous experience of the search mission being a cover for intelligence gathering or other military activities. A Canadian investigation long after the war determined that the craft had likely been shot down by North Vietnamese anti-aircraft fire, but they were unable to determine if it was intentional or not.

XW-TFR (previously F-BELX and briefly XW-TAB) had been returned to Cambodia Air Commercial when it was destroyed in an accident on June 27, 1974, following three of the four engines failing while climbing out from Battambang Airport. During the forced landing it collided with trees, causing extensive damage including one wing being torn off before the aircraft caught fire. Seventeen passengers and 2 crew members out of the 39 on board died in the crash that the crash investigation blamed on poor maintenance.

The pilot of XW-TFP was forced to ditch in the Mekong river on March 13, 1975, near the Laos–Thailand border while on a flight from Hong Kong to Vientiane. Both the pilot and co-pilot escaped the wreck but were captured by the communist Pathet Lao and held until May. The wreckage was still there in 1986.

== Operators ==
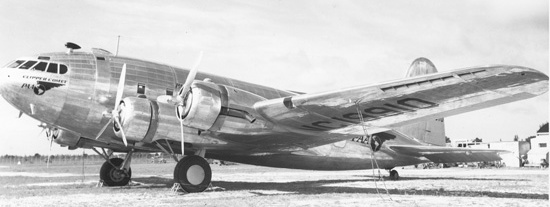
Pan Am Boeing S-307 Strato-Clipper NC19910 Clipper Comet

=== Civilian operators ===
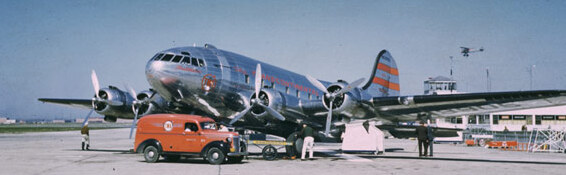
TWA Stratoliner pre-war, at Chicago airport

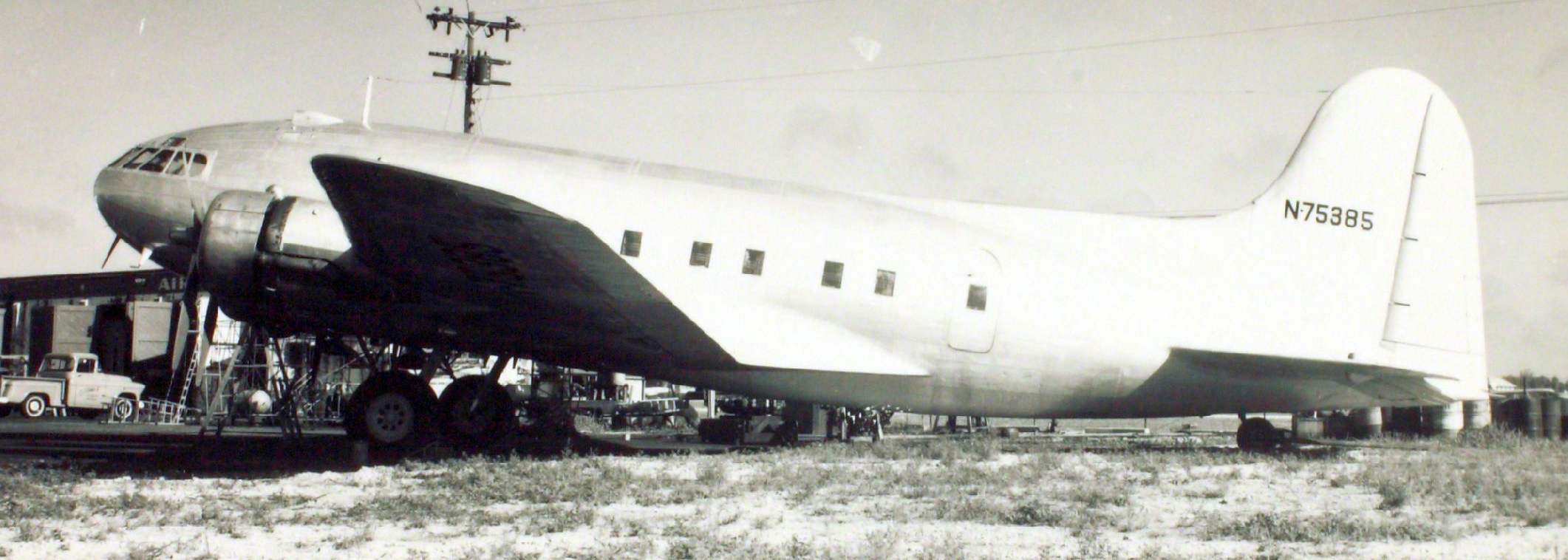
Quaker City Airways Boeing S-307 Stratoliner N75385

United States

- Howard Hughes bought one aircraft. (Note: Original operator, received aircraft from Boeing.)
- Inter-American Inc. (IA) bought ex-Pan Am Clipper Flying Cloud from the Haitian Government.
- Pan American Airways (PAA: Pan Am) received three aircraft.
- Trans World Airlines (TWA) received five aircraft.
- Quaker City Airways, operated ex-Pan Am Clipper Comet.

Ecuador

- Aerovias Ecuatorianas CA/AREA Ecuador, operated an ex-Pan Am aircraft as HC 004.

France

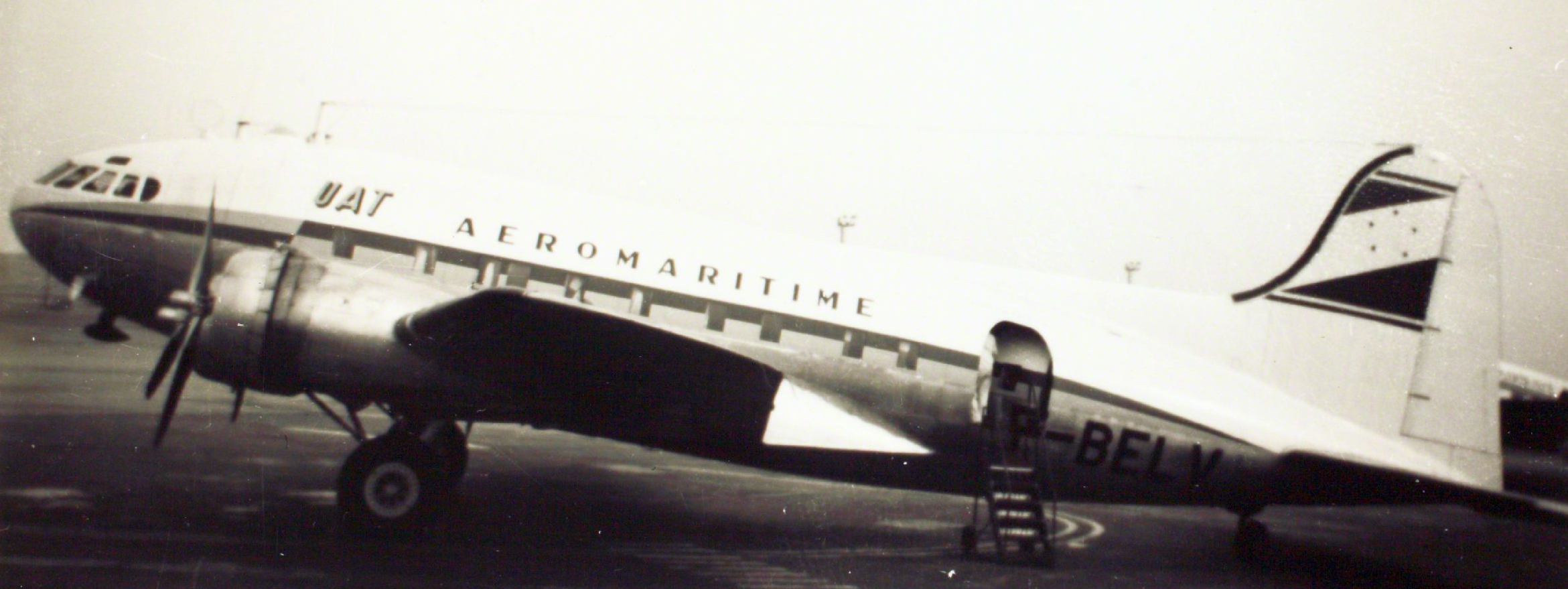
UAT Aeromaritime Boeing SA-307B-1 F-BELV

- Aigle Azur (en:Blue Eagle) operated five ex-TWA aircraft and one Pan-Am aircraft, all bought in 1951.
- Air Nautic (or Airnautic) operated three aircraft.
- Commission Internationale de Contrôle (International Control Commission in English) (CIC/ICC) and its successor International Commission of Control and Supervision operated at least three aircraft leased from UAT and CITCA.
- Compagnie Internationale de Transports Civil Aériens (CITCA) leased out ex-UAT aircraft to other operators.
- Union Aéromaritime de Transport (UAT) operated the Aigle Azur aircraft after buying them out.

Laos

- ອາກາດລາວ (Fr: Air Laos/Air Laos Transport Aériens) leased one ex-Pan Am/ex-Aigle Azur aircraft, before being renamed Royal Air Lao.
- ລາຊະວົງ ສາຍການບິນ ພາສາລາວ (En:Royal Air Lao) operated four ex-Aigle Azur aircraft.

Cambodia

- អាកាសចរណ៍ភូមិន្ទ កម្ពុជា (Fr: Royal Air Cambodge) operated one aircraft with French registration.
- Cambodia Air Commerciale operated several aircraft, under Laos registrations.

=== Military operators ===
Haiti

- Haitian Air Corps
  - Compagnie Haïtienne de Transports Aériens (CoHaTA) (a Military transport organization) operated one ex-Pan Am 307.

United States

- United States Army Air Forces operated five ex-TWA SA-307Bs as C-75s. Three Pan Am 307s operated under USAAF direction, but ownership remained with Pan Am.

== Accidents and incidents ==
The Boeing 307 was involved in eight hull-loss incidents with 67 fatalities. Four of the ten incidents involved fatalities, with one craft likely being shot down while in a war zone.

Date	Operator	Model	C/N	Reg'n	Location	Occupants	Fatalities	Synopsis	Sources
March 18, 1939	Boeing	S-307	1994	NX19901	Alder, Washington	10	10	Airframe severely overstressed after difficult spin recovery while carrying several customer representatives	
May 17, 1940	TWA	SA-307B	1999	NC19905	Pritchett, Colorado	19	0	Carb ice caused loss of power while flying in mountains which resulted in a wheels-up landing in field. Aircraft was repaired and returned to service.	
May 10, 1958	Quaker City Airways	S-307	2002	N75385	Madras, Oregon	2	0	Test flight before ferry to new operator with known fuel leaks of unknown origin. In-flight muffled cabin explosion followed by fire. Safely landed on rock-strewn mesa, but fire consumed aircraft.	
May 22, 1961	Aigle Azur; Extrême Orient	S-307	1995	F-BHHR	Ho Chi Minh, South Vietnam	28	0	Engine failure forced it to return after takeoff and aircraft destroyed after being blown off the runway by a wind gust while landing.	
December 29, 1962	Airnautic	SA-307B-1	2001	F-BELZ	Monte Renoso, Corsica	25	25	Collided with the tip of a mountain on Bastia–Nice–Ajaccio–Nice–Ajaccio–Bastia charter flight, for the worst 307 accident	
October 18, 1965	ICC/CIC	SA-307B-1	1996	F-BELV	Between Vientiane, and Hanoi, Vietnam	13	13	Likely shot down by North Vietnamese AA fire while on a scheduled non-commercial diplomatic flight carrying CIC/ICC observers	
February 27, 1971	Royal Air Lao	SA-307B-1	2000	XW-PGR	Luang Prabang, Laos	2+	0	Wing was damaged in collision with Royal Lao Air Force Douglas C-47 while landing, and a lack of spares prevented repairs.	
June 27, 1974	Cambodia Air Commercial (CACO)	SA-307B-1	1999	XW-TFR	Battambang Airport, Cambodia	39	19	Three engines failed during takeoff due to poor maintenance, and the forced landing destroyed the aircraft after a tree tore the right wing off.	
March 13, 1975	Royal Air Lao	SA-307B-1	1998	XW-TFP	Mekong River, Laos	2	0	Forced landing on Hong Kong-Vientiane cargo flight. Both pilots imprisoned by Pathet Lao. The wreck was located in 1986.	
March 28, 2002	National Air and Space Museum	S-307	2003	N19903	Elliott Bay, Washington	4	0	Ran out of fuel and ditched during shakedown test flights from Boeing Field to Everett-Paine Field, following restoration. Raised and re-restored.	

== Surviving aircraft ==
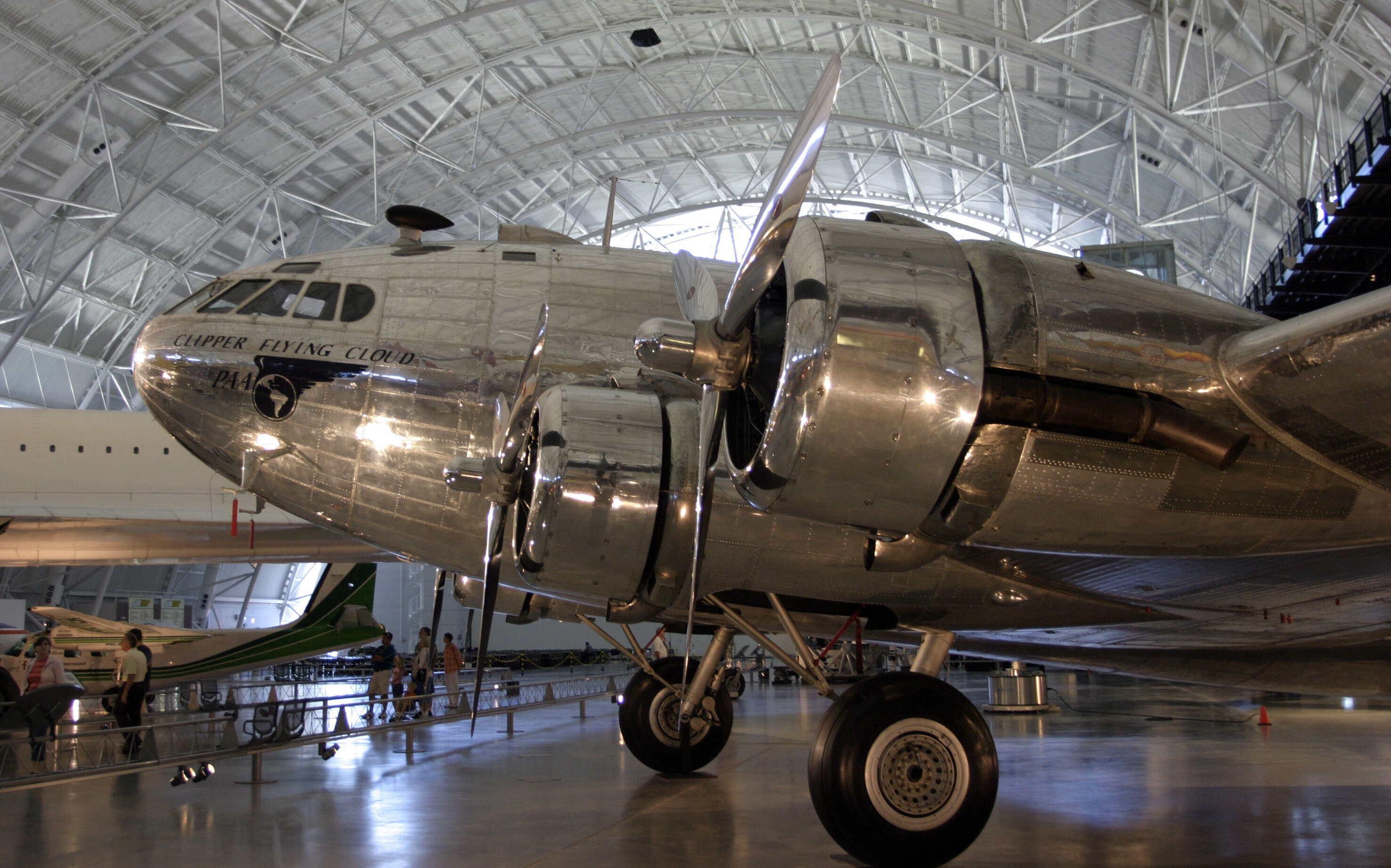
Restored ex-Pan Am Stratoliner NC19903 displayed in the Steven F. Udvar-Hazy Center

The sole intact Boeing 307 Stratoliner, NC19903, is preserved in flying condition at the Smithsonian's Steven F. Udvar-Hazy Center. After having been restored to flying condition, it was being delivered to the Smithsonian on what was to be its last flight when it ran out of fuel and ditched in Elliott Bay in Seattle, Washington, on March 28, 2002. Despite the incident, it was raised and again restored, and it completed its flight to the Smithsonian, where it was placed on display.

The forward fuselage of Howard Hughes' 307 (NX19904) also survives, although it was stripped of flying surfaces and the rear fuselage and converted into a houseboat. The aircraft was awaiting restoration at Fort Lauderdale International Airport in August 1964 but was severely damaged when Hurricane Cleo tore it loose from its tiedowns and it was blown into a stand of trees. The aircraft was later salvaged and converted into a houseboat, and the interior remains notable for the additions made when owned by Hughes. It was part of the Florida Air Museum collection. As per a Kermit Weeks Facebook post, in February 2024, it was stored with Weeks' collection at the Fantasy of Flight Museum in Florida.

== Specifications (Boeing SA-307B, ATC#726) ==
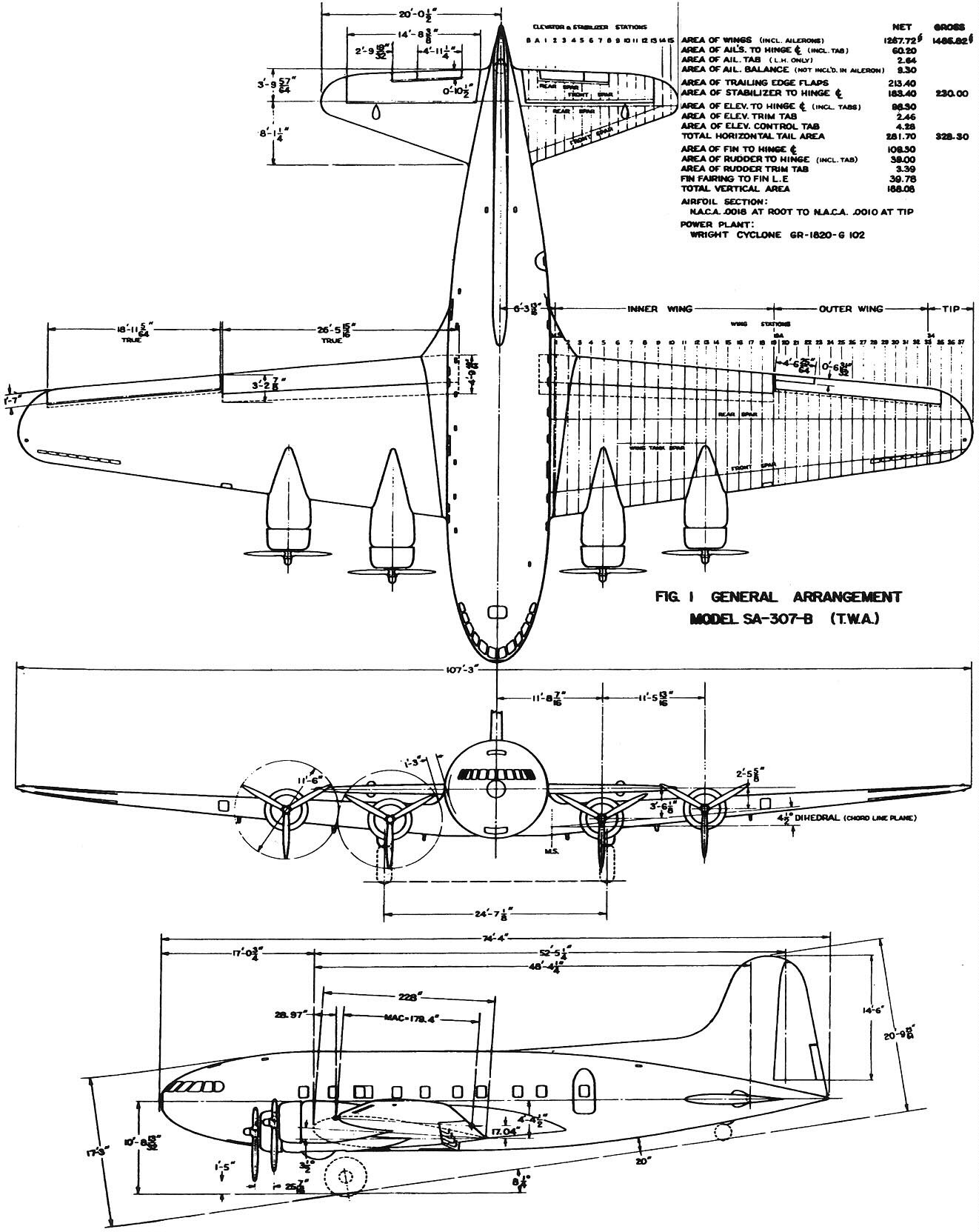
Boeing SA-307B Stratoliner three-view drawing

Data from Juptner, Joseph P. (1980). US Civil Aircraft: Vol. 8 (ATC 701–800). Aero Publishers. pp. 102–104. ISBN 978-0816891788.

General characteristics

- Crew: Five, including pilot, co-pilot, flight engineer and two flight attendants
- Capacity: Daytime seating for 33, nighttime capacity 25, in 16 berths and 9 reclining chairs
- Length: 74 ft 4 in (22.66 m)
- Wingspan: 107 ft 3 in (32.69 m) (Note: Span was greater than for the B-17 because of the wider fuselage)
- Wing chord: 19 ft 0 in (5.79 m) at root and 9 ft 4.5 in (2.858 m) at tip rib
- Height: 20 ft 9 in (6.32 m) at rudder
- Undercarriage track: 295 in (7.5 m)
- Wing area: 1,486 sq ft (138.1 m^{2})
- Airfoil: NACA 0018 at root, NACA 0010 at tip
- Wing dihedral: 4.5° from chord line
- Wing incidence: 3.5° constant root to tip
- Empty weight: 30,000 lb (13,608 kg) to 31,200 lb (14,200 kg) in overload condition.
- Gross weight: 45,000 lb (20,412 kg)
- Maximum load: 15,000 lb (6,800 kg), with 30 passengers, 650 lb (290 kg) of baggage and 1,275 US gal (4,830 L; 1,062 imp gal)/5,750 lb (2,610 kg) of fuel,
- Fuel capacity: 1,275 US gal (4,830 L; 1,062 imp gal) normal, carried within the wings. Overload up to 1,800 US gal (6,800 L; 1,500 imp gal)
- Fuel consumption: 200 US gal (760 L; 170 imp gal)/hr
- Oil capacity: 100–180 US gal (380–680 L; 83–150 imp gal)
- Powerplant: 4 × Wright GR-1820-G105A Cyclone air-cooled radial engines with two-stage superchargers, 1,100 hp (820 kW) each at 2400 rpm for sea level takeoff, reduced to 900 hp (670 kW) at 2300 rpm at 17,300 ft (5,300 m)
- Propellers: three-bladed Hamilton Standard all-metal Hydromatic constant-speed propellers, 11 ft 6 in (3.51 m) diameter

Performance

- Maximum speed: 250 mph (400 km/h, 220 kn) at 16,200 ft (4,900 m)
- Cruise speed: 222 mph (357 km/h, 193 kn) at 19,000 ft (5,800 m) and 75% power
- Minimum control speed: 70 mph (110 km/h, 61 kn) with flaps
- Takeoff run: 1,800 ft (550 m)
- Landing run: 2,050 ft (620 m)
- Range: 1,300 mi (2,100 km, 1,100 nmi) at 19,000 ft (5,800 m) & 75% power
- Service ceiling: 23,800 ft (7,300 m) , reduced to 18,000 ft (5,500 m) when on three engines
- Cruising altitude: 15,000–20,000 ft (4,600–6,100 m)
- Absolute ceiling: 25,200 ft (7,700 m)
- Rate of climb: 1,200 ft/min (6.1 m/s) initial, from sea level
- Wing loading: 30 lb/sq ft (150 kg/m^{2})
- Power loading: 12.5 lb/hp (7.6 kg/kW) takeoff, 10.25 lb/hp (6.23 kg/kW) cruise

== See also ==
- Boeing 377 Stratocruiser
- Renard R.35 (first airliner with a pressurized cabin)

Related development

- Boeing B-17 Flying Fortress

Aircraft of comparable role, configuration, and era

- de Havilland Albatross
- Bloch MB.160
- Douglas DC-4E
- Fairey FC1 (project only)
- Focke-Wulf Fw 200 Condor
- Junkers Ju 90
- Lockheed Model 44 Excalibur (project only)
- Piaggio P.108C
- Potez 662
- Short S.32 (project only)

Related lists

- List of aircraft of World War II
- List of civil aircraft
- List of military aircraft of the United States

== Bibliography ==
- "Historical Snapshot: Model 307 Stratoliner – Boeing". Boeing. 2022. Archived from the original on July 5, 2022.
- Abzug, Malcolm J.; Larrabee, E. Eugene (2005). Airplane Stability and Control: A History of the Technologies that Made Aviation Possible. Cambridge, UK: Cambridge University Press. ISBN 978-0521021289.
- Abel, Drina Welch, ed. (1991). Paul Matt Scale Airplane Drawings. Vol. 1. Destin, Florida: Aviation Heritage/Aviation Book Co. p. 37. ISBN 978-0943691046.
- Beall, Wellwood E. (March 1945). "Rebuilding the Boeing Stratoliners". Aviation. Vol. 44, no. 3. Albany, NY: McGraw-Hill. pp. 148–151.
- Betts, Ed (November 1989). "The La Guardia Airport 50 years". TARPA Topics. Belhaven, NC: the Active Retired Pilot's Association of TWA. pp. 66–75.
- Betts, Ed (August 1990). "The Boeing "Stratoliner" (1935 thru 1940)". TARPA Topics. Belhaven, NC: the Active Retired Pilot's Association of TWA. pp. 55–74.
- Betts, Ed (February 1992). "The Intercontinental Division". TARPA Topics. Belhaven, NC: the Active Retired Pilot's Association of TWA. pp. 59–85.
- Betts, Ed (1993). "The Boeing Stratoliners and TWA". American Aviation Historical Society Journal. 38 (3).
- Betts, Ed (August 1994). "The Boeing 307 Stratoliners 1945-1951". TARPA Topics. Belhaven, NC: the Active Retired Pilot's Association of TWA. pp. 51–62.
- Bowers, Peter M (1989). Boeing Aircraft since 1916 (Third ed.). London: Putnam. ISBN 978-0851778044.
- Cartwright, C.M., ed. (March 23, 1939). ""Stratoliner" Crash sets insured loss record in Aviation – $500,000 Plane Covered for Full Replacement Cost: Partly Reinsured Abroad". The National Underwriter. Vol. 43, no. 12. Chicago, IL: National Underwriter Co.
- Davies, R.E.G. (1987). Pan Am – an Airline and its Aircraft – An illustrated history of the world's greatest airline and the airplanes that revolutionized air transport from 1927 to the present. New York City: Orion Books. p. 49. ISBN 978-0517566398.
- Davies, R.E.G. (2000). TWA – an Airline and its Aircraft – 75 years of pioneering progress. McLean, Virginia: Paladwr Press. ISBN 978-1888962161.
- De Wulf, Herman (September 1978). "A Belgian Rare Avis". Air International. Vol. 15, no. 3. Bromley, UK: Fine Scroll. pp. 147–149.
- Dietrich, Noah; Thomas, Bob (1972). Howard, The Amazing Mr. Hughes. Greenwich: Fawcett Publications. p. 148. ISBN 978-0449136522.
- Dijkstra, Ronald (2016). "Boeing 100 jaar – 80 jaar samenwerking met de KLM". Luchtvaart Historisch Tijdschrift LUCHTVAARTKENNIS (en:Aviation Historical Magazine AVIATION KNOWLEDGE) (in Dutch). Vol. 3, no. 65. Holland: Vereeniging ter Bevordering van de Luchtscheepvaart (en:Association for the Promotion of Aviation). pp. 75–82. ISSN 1381-9100.
- Ford, Daniel (March–April 2004). "First and Last Strat: Boeing's Model 307 and its Survivors". Air Enthusiast. Vol. 110. pp. 54–60. ISSN 0143-5450.
- Gardner, Lester D., ed. (November 1940). "News Review". Journal of the Aeronautical Sciences Aeronautical Review Section. 8 (1). Easton, Pennsylvania: Institute of the Aeronautical Sciences: 9–10. doi:10.2514/8.10434.
- Haddow, G.W.; Grosz, Peter M. (1962). The German Giants, The Story of the R-planes 1914–1919. London: Putman.
- Hagedorn, Daniel P. (1993). Central American and Caribbean Air Forces. Kent, UK: Air-Britain (Historians). p. 133. ISBN 978-0851302102.
- McLarren, Robert (July 1938). "The Plane on the cover". Model Airplane News. Vol. 9, no. 1. Mount Morris, IL: Jay Publishing. pp. 31 & 40.
- Hardy, Michael John (1982). Boeing. World Aircraft. NY: Beaufort Books. p. 30. ISBN 978-0850595079.
- Hardy, Mike (January 2004). "The Stratoliner Story (Part 1)". Air International. Vol. 46, no. 1. pp. 21–24. ISSN 0306-5634.
- Hardy, Mike (February 2004). "The Stratoliner Story (Part 2)". Air International. Vol. 46, no. 2. pp. 69–72. ISSN 0306-5634.
- Juptner, Joseph P. (1980). US Civil Aircraft: Vol. 8 (ATC 701–800). Aero Publishers. pp. 75–77 & 102–104. ISBN 978-0816891788.
- Marrett, George J. (2004). Howard Hughes : aviator. Annapolis: Naval Institute Press. ISBN 978-1591145103.
- Minshall, R. J. (May 1940). "Into the Sub-Stratosphere". Aviation. pp. 47–49.
