= Jacques Fath =

French fashion designer (1912–1954)

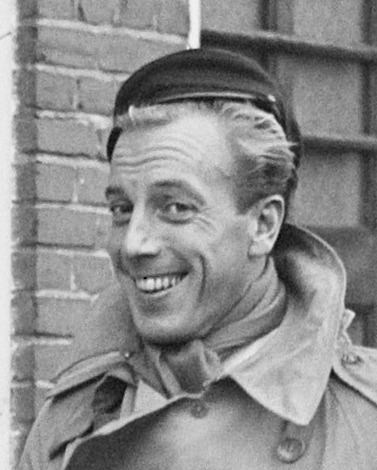
- Born: 6 September 1912; Maisons-Laffitte, France
- Died: 13 November 1954 (aged 42); Paris, France
- Education: Vincennes University
- Known for: Fashion Design
- Style: Haute Couture
- Spouse: Geneviéve Boucher de la Bruyére
- Partner: Léonide Moguy
- Children: 1
- Awards: Croix de Guerre; Légion d'honneur Neiman Marcus Fashion Award

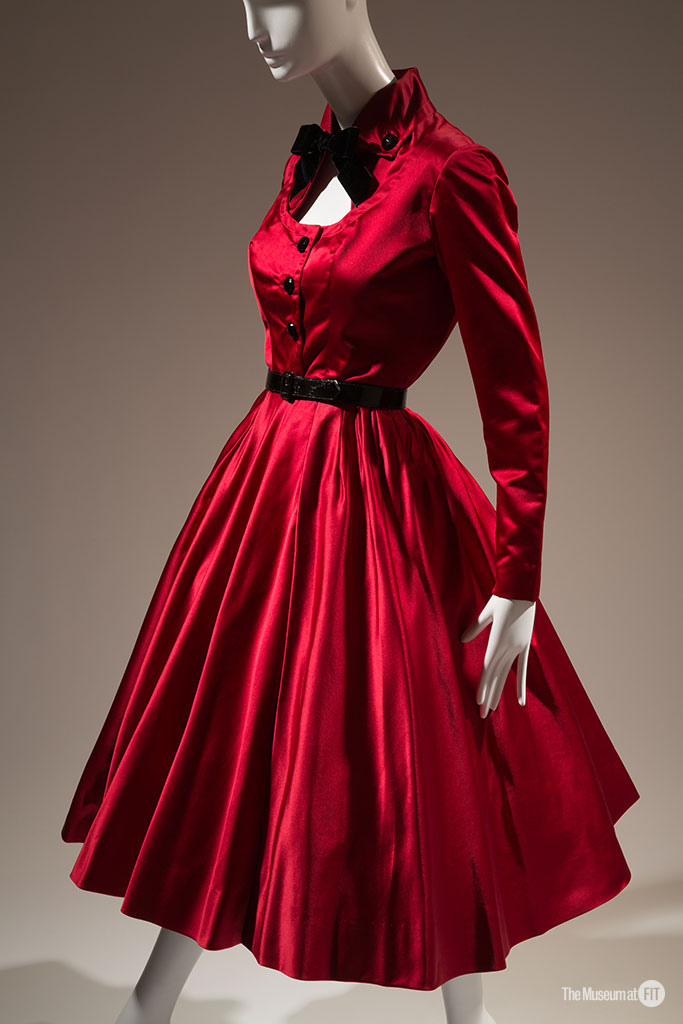
Jacques Fath for Joseph Halpert Cocktail Dress

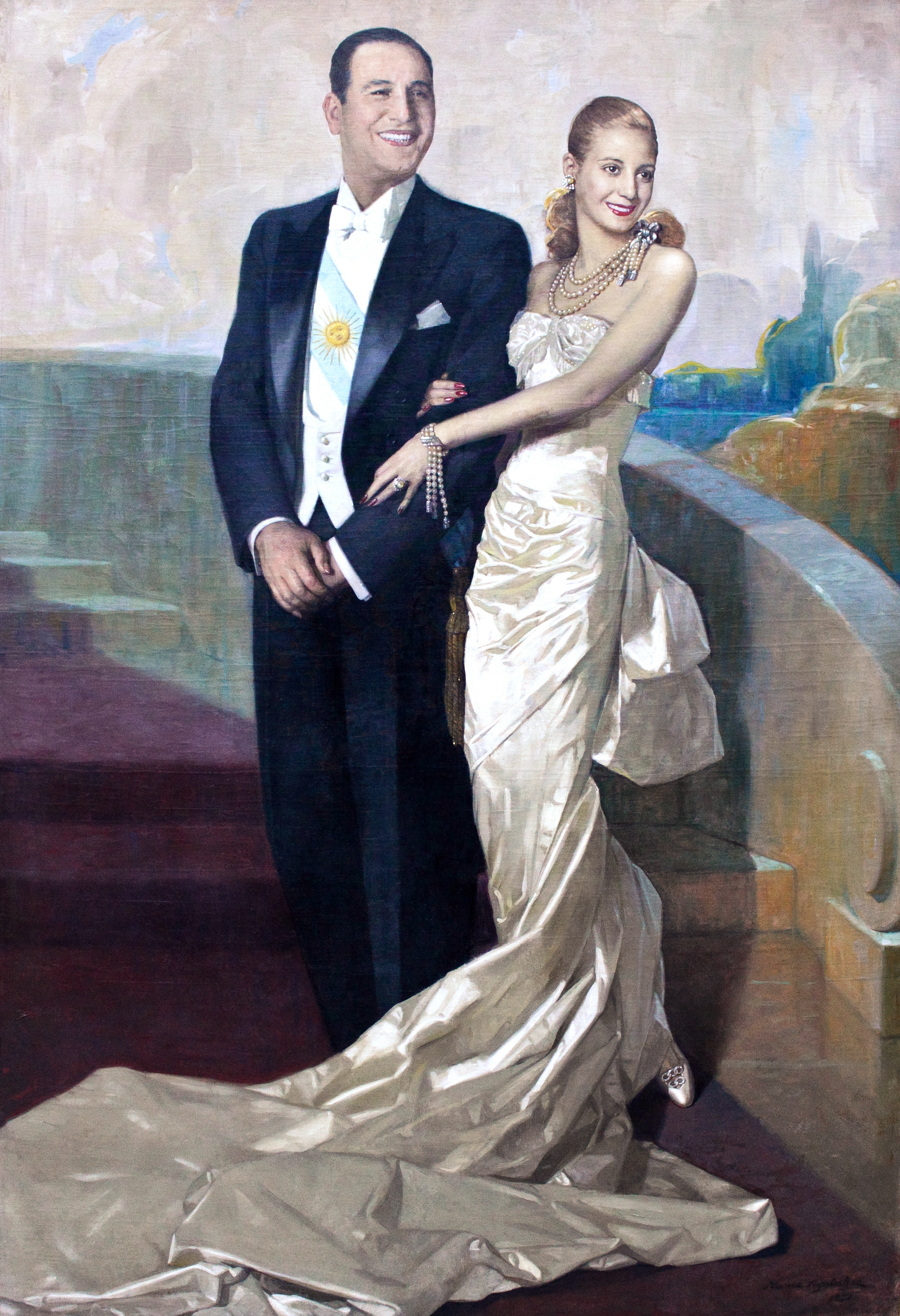
Fath's Dress for Eva Perón, 1948

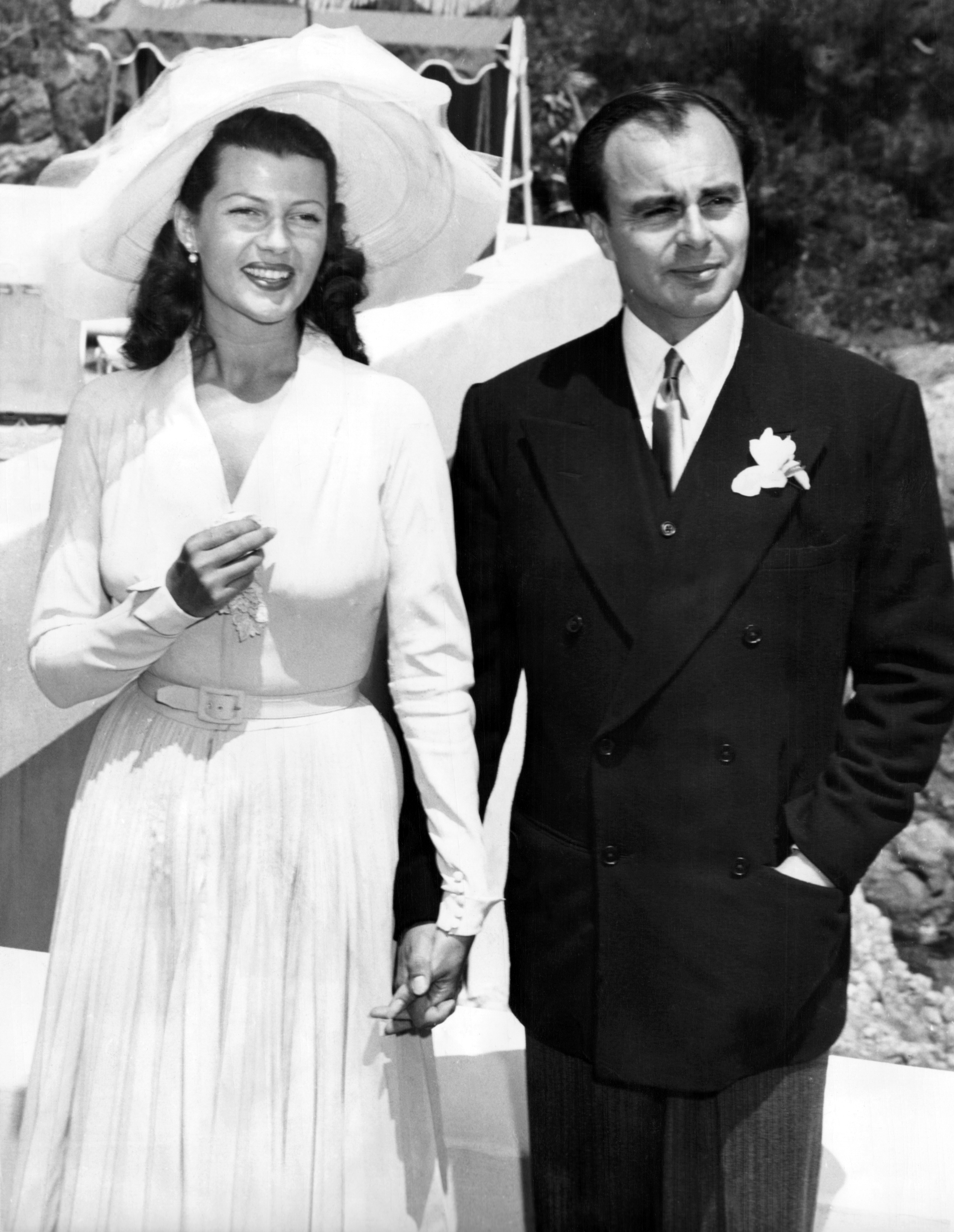
Fath's Wedding Dress for Rita Hayworth, 1949

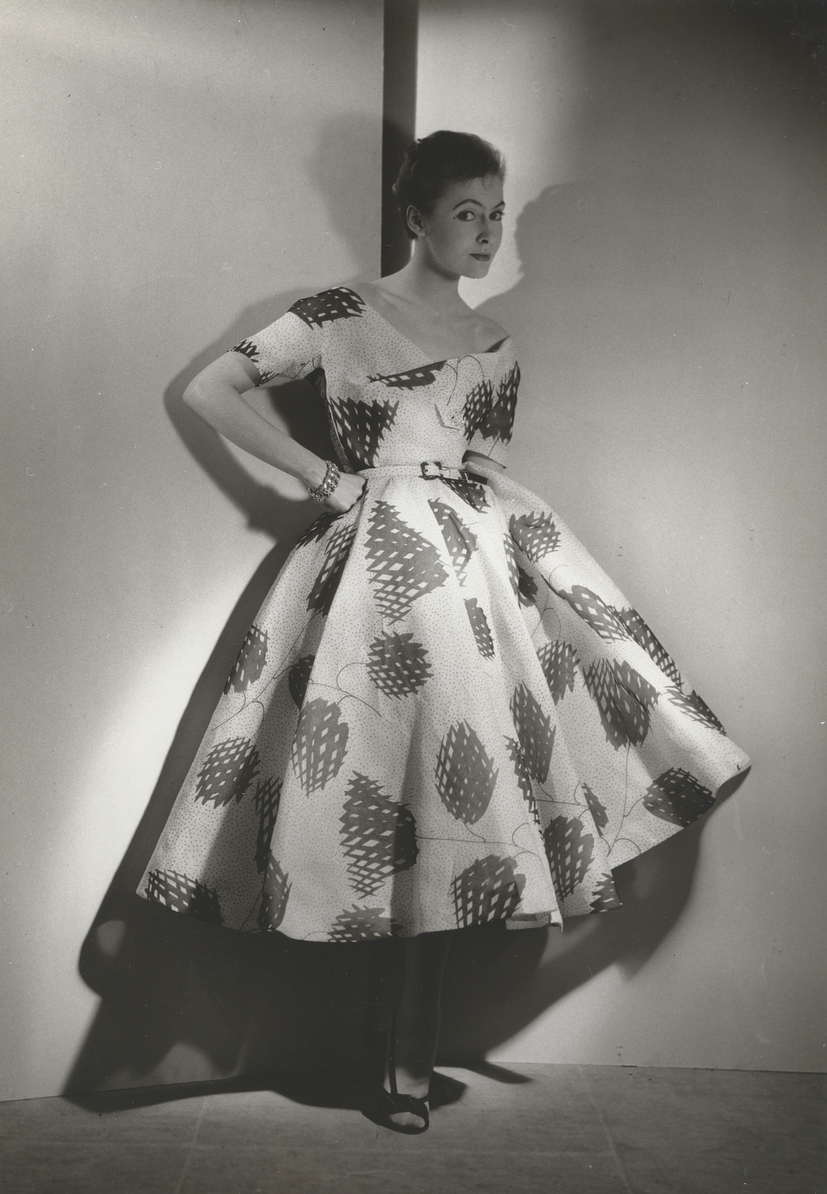
A Fath Cocktail Dress c 1946

Jacques Fath (6 September 1912 – 13 November 1954) was a French fashion designer who was one of the Big Four of post-war haute couture, the others being Christian Dior, Pierre Balmain and Jean Dessès.

== Early life and education ==
Fath was the son of André Fath, an Alsatian-Flemish insurance agent, and Béatrix Maurin, a painter. His paternal great-grandmother, Caroline Fath, was a fashion illustrator. His great-grandfather Georges Fath was a playwright and his paternal grandfather, Rene-Maurice Fath, was a landscape painter. Jacques' family encouraged him to go into business and he briefly studied accounting and law at Vincennes University before spending two years working as a stockbroker. He completed his year of mandatory military service, then spent a short time in drama school. He took classes in pattern-making and fashion drawing, but that was the extent of his formal education in fashion; most of what he knew was learned by reading books and attending museum exhibits, the theatre, the opera and the ballet.

== Career ==
In 1937, with the backing of the socialite Nevarte Essayan Gulbenkian, Fath established the House of Fath in a two-room salon on the Rue La Boétie; that year, he held his first show. In 1939, he was drafted into the French Army as a second-class gunner and, as France fell, was captured and held prisoner. He was released after a month and, in August 1940, discharged. He received the Croix de Guerre and the Légion d'honneur.

While other designers closed their businesses because of the war, Fath continued undaunted. In 1940, he bought out Mme Gulbenkian and re-opened his studio, this time on the Rue Francois Ier. In 1944, he moved into his last location at 39 Avenue Pierre Ier de Serbie, and hired Hubert de Givenchy, Valentino Garavani and Guy Laroche as assistants. Among his models were "the original supermodel" Lisa Fonssagrives and Lucie Daouphars, who would become the muse of Christian Dior.

Fath's business was dramatically changed in 1945, when he hired a model named Simone Graziani. In keeping with his somewhat eccentric personality, Fath declared that he already had a model named Simone and changed Graziani's name to Bettina. Fath was a disorganized person and Graziani, an aspiring fashion designer, was tireless, resourceful and efficient. She worked for Fath full-time, not only as a model, but as the organizer and promoter of his fashion shows, and as his public relations and marketing person. Bettina Graziani, eventually nicknamed "Queen Bettina", would become Givenchy's muse and one of the most famous models in the world.

In 1945, Fath created four designs for Théâtre de la Mode, a traveling exhibition of fashion dolls intended to promote French fashion. In 1948, the American manufacturer Joseph Halpert contracted Fath to design two ready-to-wear collections annually, to be sold at high-end department stores under the label "Jacques Fath for Joseph Halpert". This agreement, one of the first of its kind, allowed American women access to haute couture at more affordable prices. The American connection led him to Hollywood, where he was hired as the costume designer for the massively successful film The Red Shoes, after which his work was much in demand by other directors. He designed elaborate accessories, such as silk stockings with jeweled garters. He also went into the fragrance business, releasing Chasuble (1945), Iris Gris (1946), Green Water (1947), Canasta (1950) and Fath de Fath (1953). In 1953, he launched "Jacques Fath Université", a ready-to-wear line that included scarves, hats, ties, and hosiery.

Fath was charming, charismastic and cheerful, and his youthful, glamorous and sexy designs made him extremely popular with the public, and with the media, which dubbed him the "Little Prince of Paris Haute Couture"; in 1949, Life Magazine declared him the heir to the Dior throne. In wartime, he'd had to get creative with scarce materials and, throughout his career, used the unconventional, including hemp, upholstery cord, bugle beads, crystals, and sequins made of walnut and almond shells. His style was marked by undulating lines, asymmetry, pleating, and volume. He perfected a clean and tailored hourglass shape, enhancing it with plunging necklines, padded bras, sharp pocket details, dramatic pleats and daring color combinations. Voluminous skirts, for day and evening, cascaded from constricted waistlines, or appeared as explosions of fabric under large coats and jackets. Gowns of velvet and lace might include highly structured boned bodices and crinolines. All garments were made so that they could be re-sized, and the purchase of a piece included alterations and repairs, a level of service which made Fath's clients extremely loyal to him. He was also the first couturier to introduce themed seasonal collections; the skirts in his 1950 collection 'Lily' were shaped to resemble flowers.

Fath's international clients included Ava Gardner, Greta Garbo, Lana Turner, Marlene Dietrich, Grace Kelly, Josephine Baker, Jacqueline Kennedy and Rita Hayworth, who wore a Fath dress for her 1949 wedding to Prince Aly Khan. Lady Alexandra Howard-Johnston wore a Fath gown to the 1947 wedding of Princess Elizabeth and Philip Mountbatten. Eva Perón is wearing a Fath gown in A Place to Stand, the 1948 portrait of Eva and Juan Perón now in the Museo del Bicentenario in Buenos Aires.

== Personal life and death ==
While in acting school, Fath met the director Léonide Moguy, who cast Fath in his first film. The two were lovers and companions until c. 1938. In 1939, Fath married their mutual friend Geneviéve Boucher de la Bruyére, an aristocrat and model who had been at drama school with Fath. While it was widely considered a lavender marriage, as Geneviéve was thought to be a lesbian, they had one son, Philippe (born 1943). The two became the power couple of Paris. They were seen everywhere and became known for hosting lavish parties, including themed balls for as many as 800 people, at the Château de Corbeville, their grand home in Orsay.

In 1952, Fath was diagnosed with leukemia and died on 13 November 1954. Approximately 4,000 people attended his funeral at Saint-Pierre de Chaillot Church; Pathé News filmed the funeral and included memorial images in the reel. He was buried on the grounds of the Château de Corbeville.

== The House of Fath post-1954 ==
Geneviéve ran the Fath house after her husband's death. He had not stopped working after his cancer diagnosis and left behind many designs. In 1955, with the help of designers Catherine Brivet and Pierre Matthey, and fabric expert Suzanne Renoult, The House of Fath presented these designs in a well-regarded collection titled Symphony in Gray. Geneviéve then closed the haute couture division and, from 1957, the house produced perfumes, gloves, hosiery, and other accessories. Geneviéve died in 1993, age 72.

The house returned in 1992, under the ownership of Altus Finances Group, part of Credit Lyonnais. Fath haute couture was relaunched, along with ready-to-wear, all under the direction of Dutch designer Tom Van Lingen. Altus bought back the Fath fragrance licenses, which had been held by L'Oréal from 1964. Green Water and Fath de Fath were re-launched. By 1994, the brand's sales rose to USD$10 million, with $3.2 million from fragrances and sales divided almost equally between France, the USA, Japan and the rest of Europe.

By 1996, the house was not profitable and in 1997 it was sold to Groupe Emmanuelle Khanh. Lingen was replaced by Elena Nazaroff, whose three-year contract was terminated after five months—her one collection, which was mostly of synthetic fabrics, was dubbed "prostitute chic" by the French press and did not attract retail attention. Nazaroff was replaced by Octavio Pizarro, who continued with haute couture and accessories until 2002. In 1998, the fragrances license had been sold to Star Fragrance International. L'Oréal had released Fath's Love (1968) and Expression (1977); in 1998, Star added Fath Pour L'Homme and, in 1999, Yin and Yang.

In 2001, Groupe Emmanuelle Khanh became the France Luxury Group, which included Emmanuelle Khanh, Jean-Louis Scherrer, Harel Paris and Jacques Fath. Lizzy Disney was appointed as the chief designer of Jacques Fath. In December 2002, France Luxury Group was acquired by investment banker Alain Duménil and Disney left two months later. Fath became dormant until 2007 when Duménil, which had named his company the Alliance Designers Group, re-launched Fath as an accessories line under the creative direction of his daughter, Laurence Duménil. The new line was introduced in 2010 but soon closed.

In 2008 the Panouge Group acquired the Fath perfume license. In 2025 a Jacques Fath Parfums boutique opened on Paris' Avenue Victor-Hugo. As of 2026, there are 47 fragrances marketed under the Fath name.

In 2026, Maison Jacques Fath embarked on a new creative direction. On 11 May 2026, the couture house resumed operations at Rue Saint-Honoré.

== Film and television ==
=== As costume designer ===
- Jenny Lamour (Quai des Orfèvres), for Simone Renant, 1947
- The Red Shoes, for Moira Shearer, 1948
- Between Eleven and Midnight, for Madeleine Robinson, 1948
- The Barton Mystery (Le mystère Barton), for Françoise Rosay and Madeleine Robinson, 1949
- Portrait of a Killer, aka Portrait of an Assassin, for Maria Montez and Arletty, 1949
- Here Is the Beauty (La belle que voilà), for Michèle Morgan, 1950
- The Moment of Truth (La minute de vérité), for Michèle Morgan 1952
- La vierge du Rhin, for Elina Labourdette 1953
- Death of a Cyclist (Muerte de un ciclista), for Lucia Bosè 1955
- Abdullah the Great, aka Abdullah's Harem, for Kay Kendall and Marina Berti 1955

=== Other ===
- Fath had a minor role in Léonide Moguy's 1938 film Prison sans barreaux, for which he also designed costumes.
- Fath appeared as a character in the 1949 film Scandal on the Champs-Élysées, directed by Roger Blanc. That year, he was also twice interviewed on The Faye Emerson Show.
- In 1951, in an episode titled "Jacques Fath Fashion Girls", Fath's models appeared on The James Melton Show.
- In 1952, he was featured in Reflets de Cannes, the first show about the Cannes Film Festival.
- Fath was the subject of a 1993 documentary by Pascal Franck called Les Folies de Fath.
- In 2007, Fath appeared in an episode of the Netflix series L'invité.

== Gallery ==
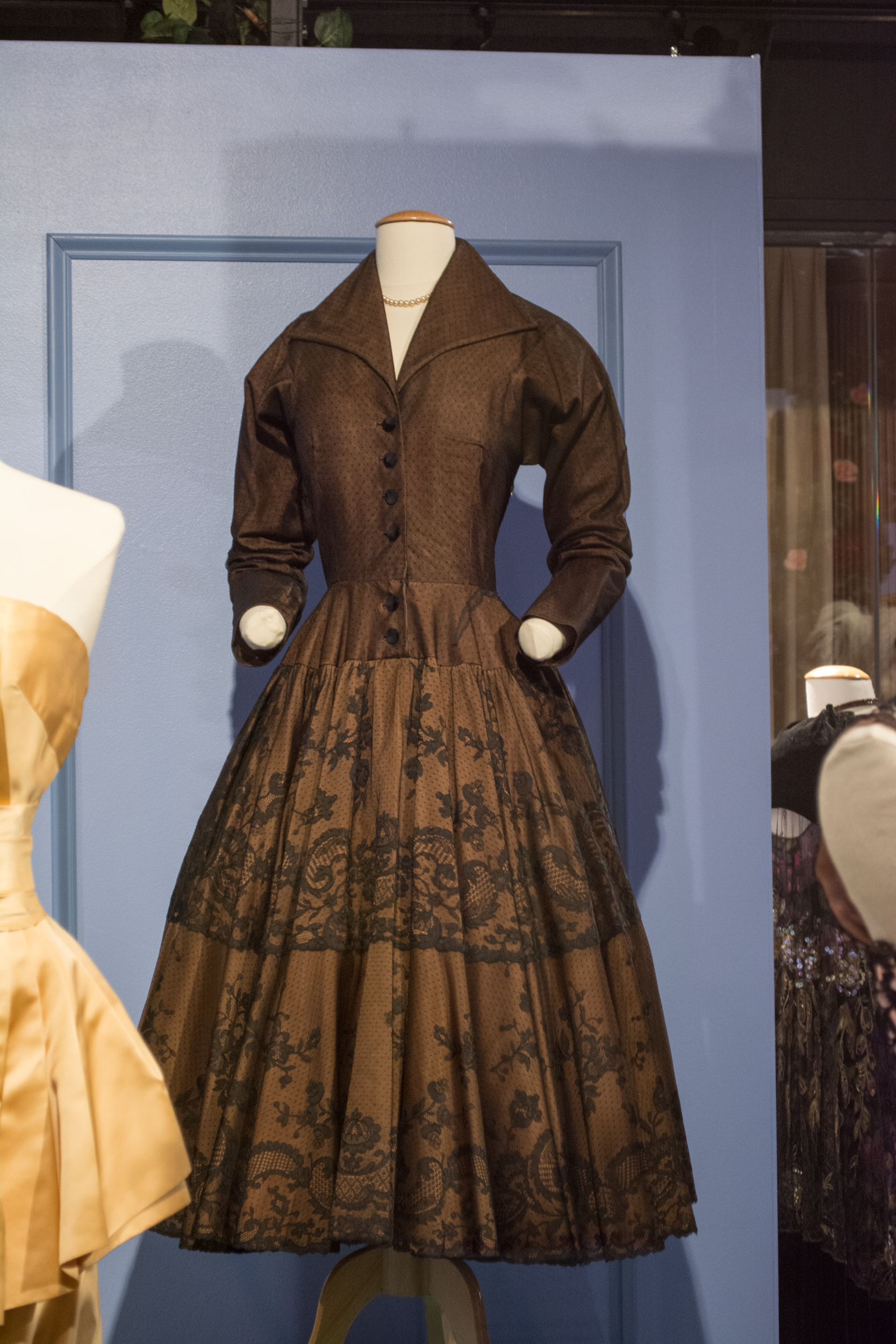
Fath Cocktail Dress 1951

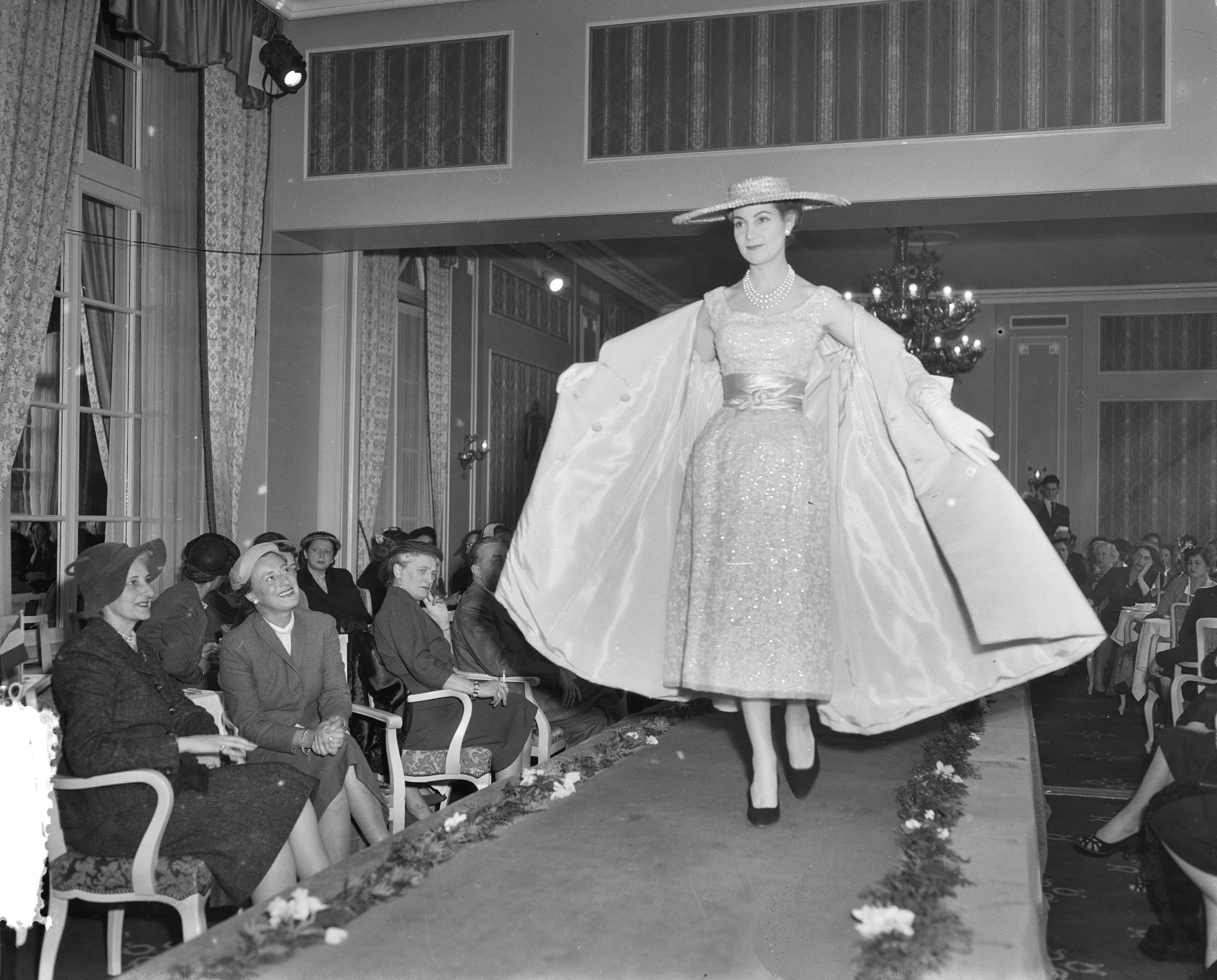
A Fath Show at the Victoria Hotel, Amsterdam 1953

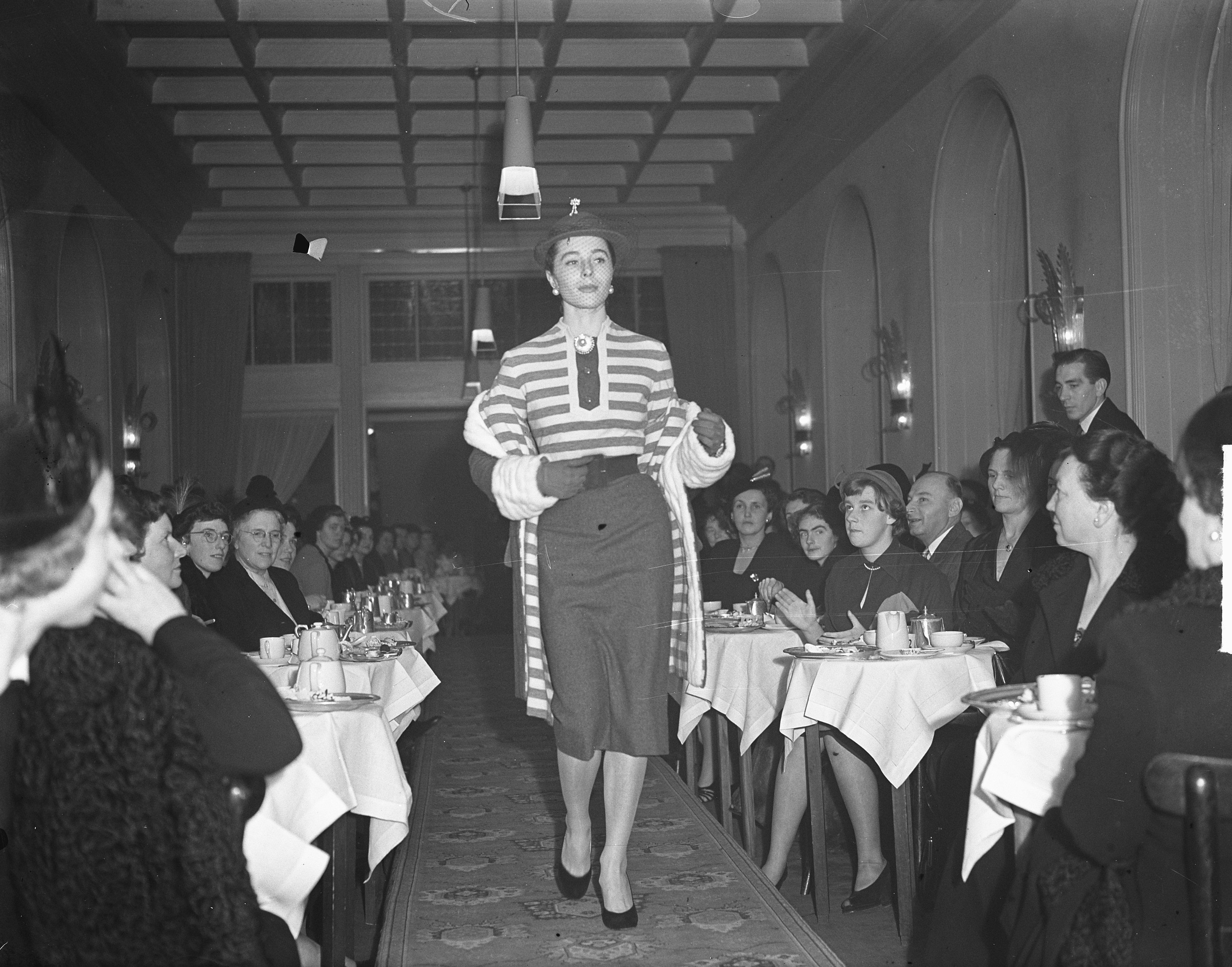
Graziana at the Victoria Hotel Show 1953

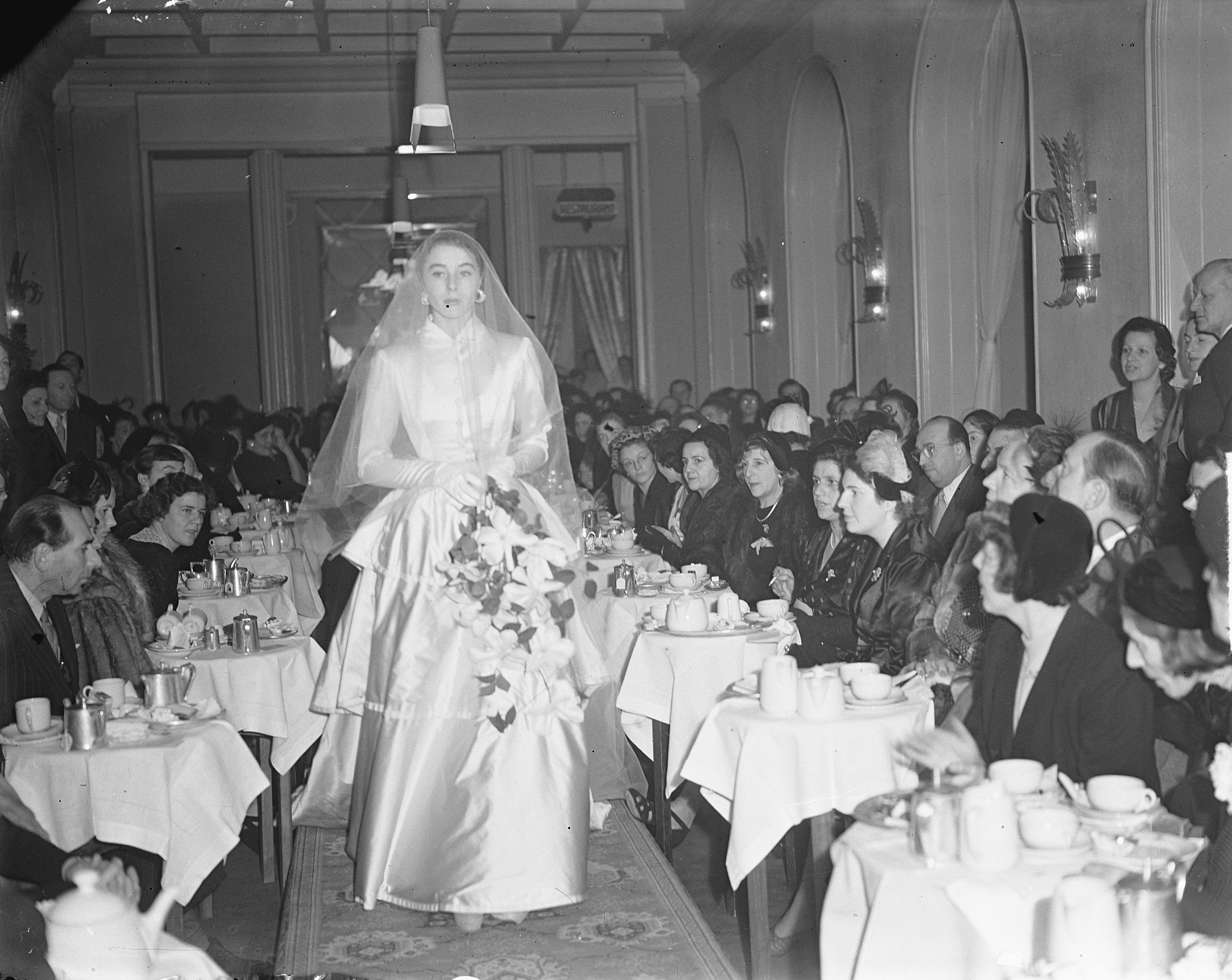
Graziana at the Victoria Hotel Show 1953

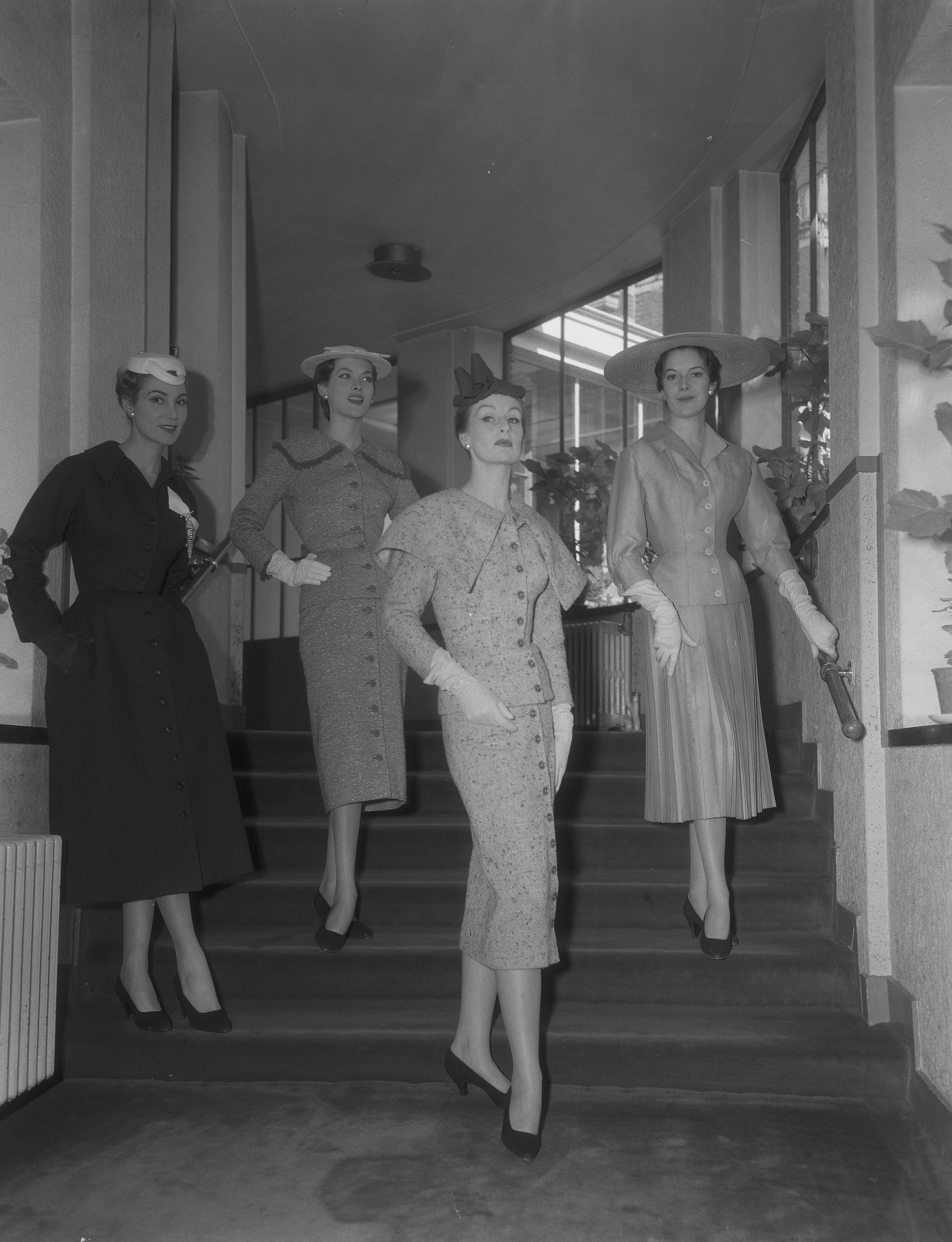
The Victoria Hotel Show 1953

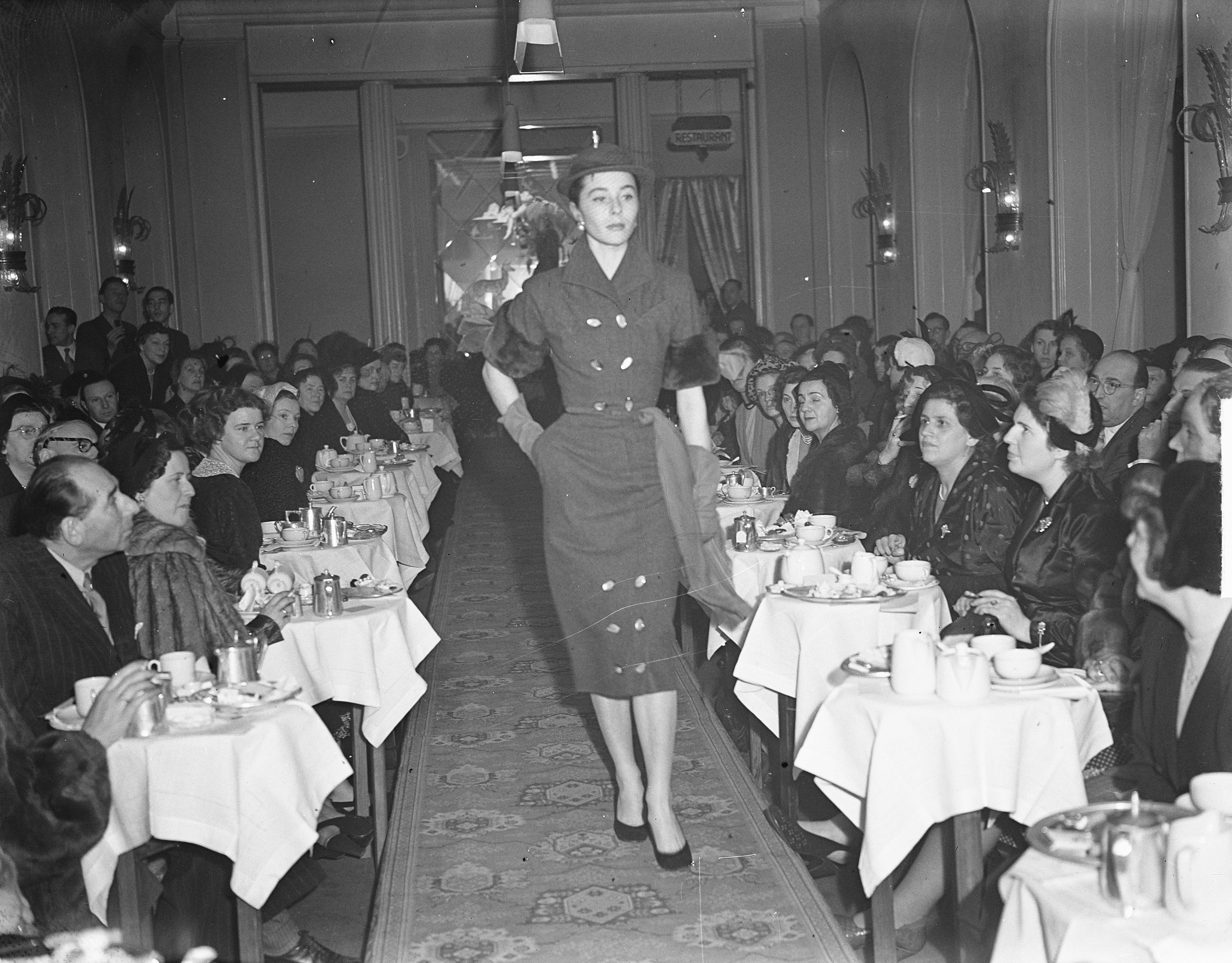
Graziana at the Victoria Hotel Show 1953

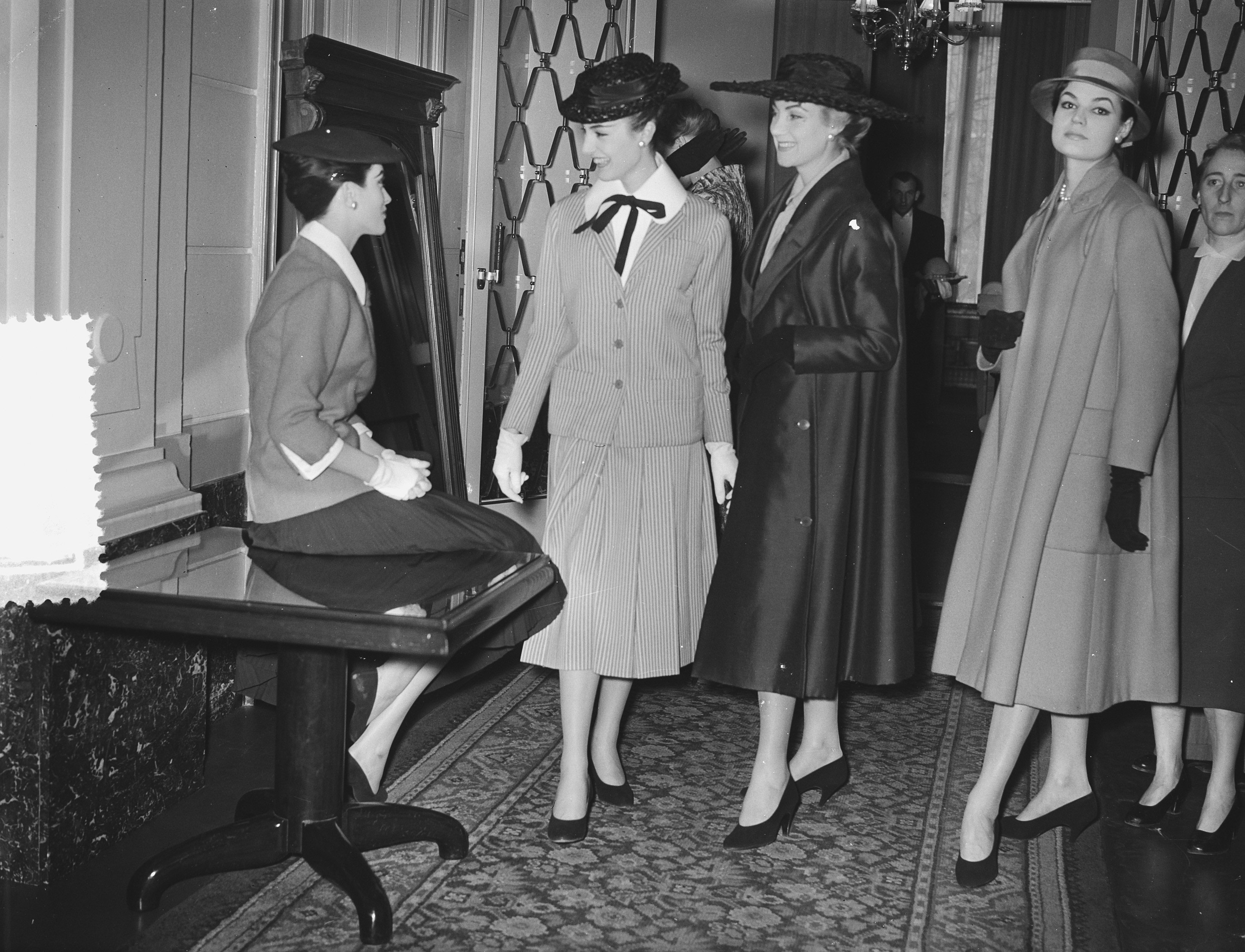
The Victoria Hotel Show 1953

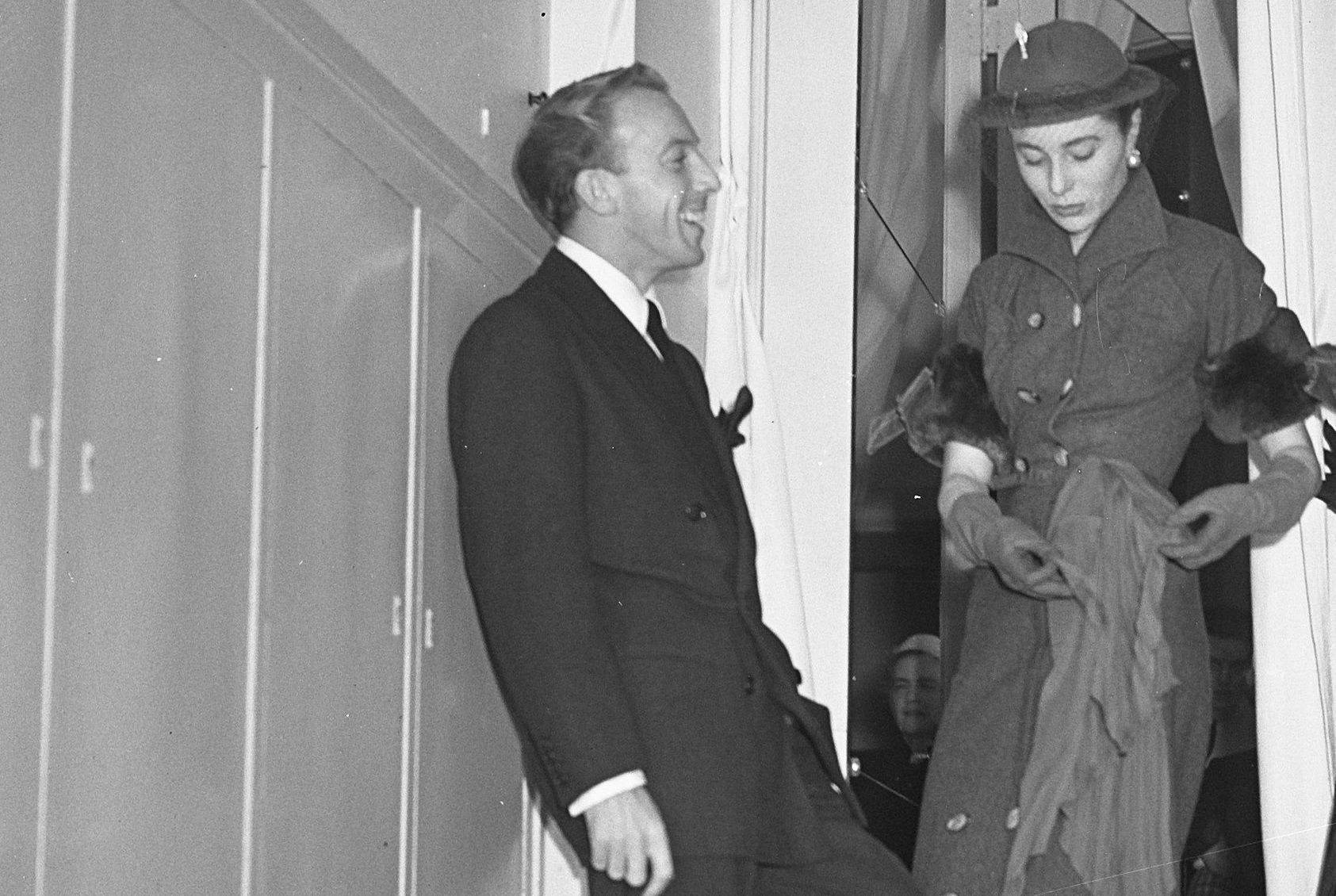
Fath with Graziani at The Victoria Hotel Show 1953

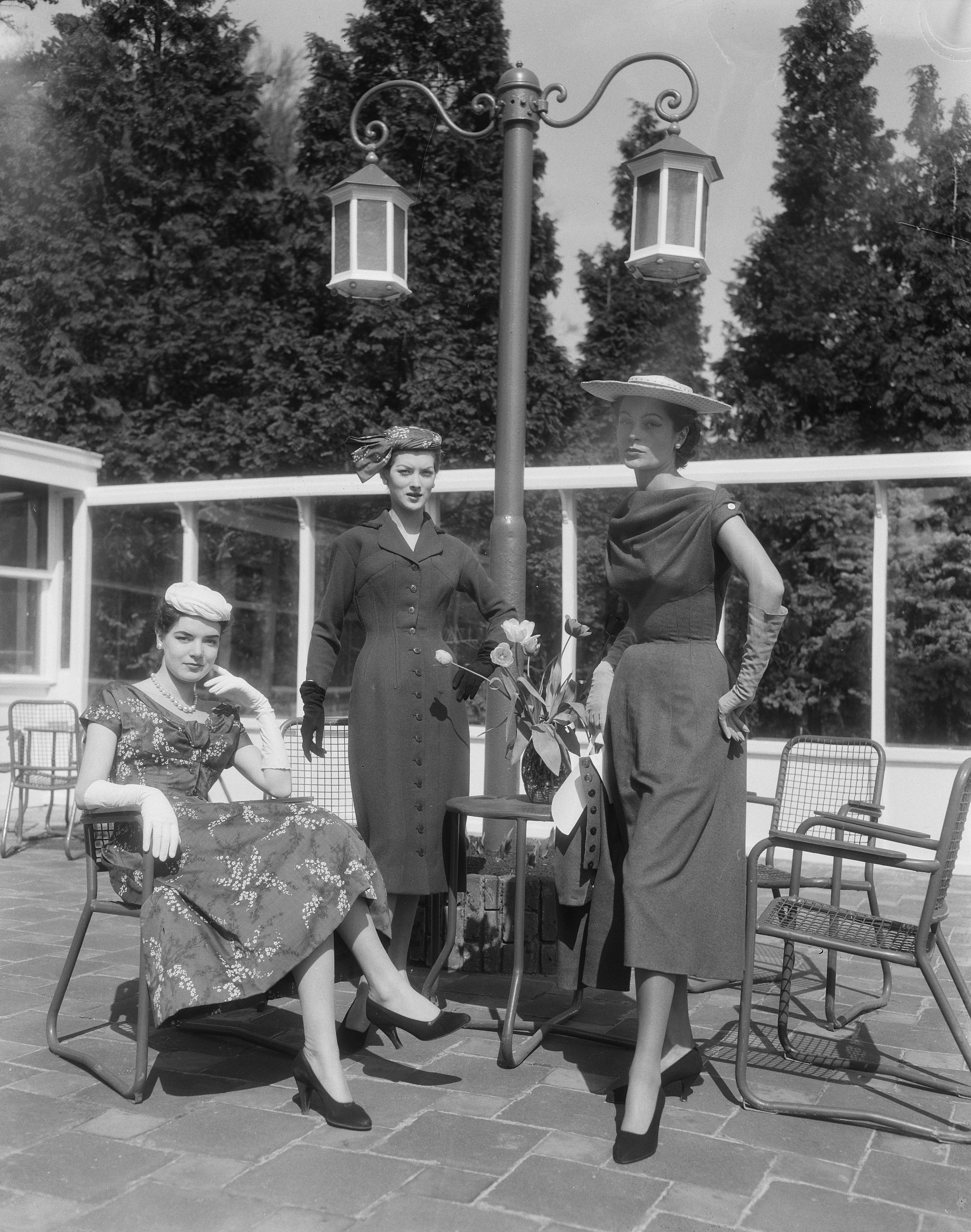
Fath Daywear 1953

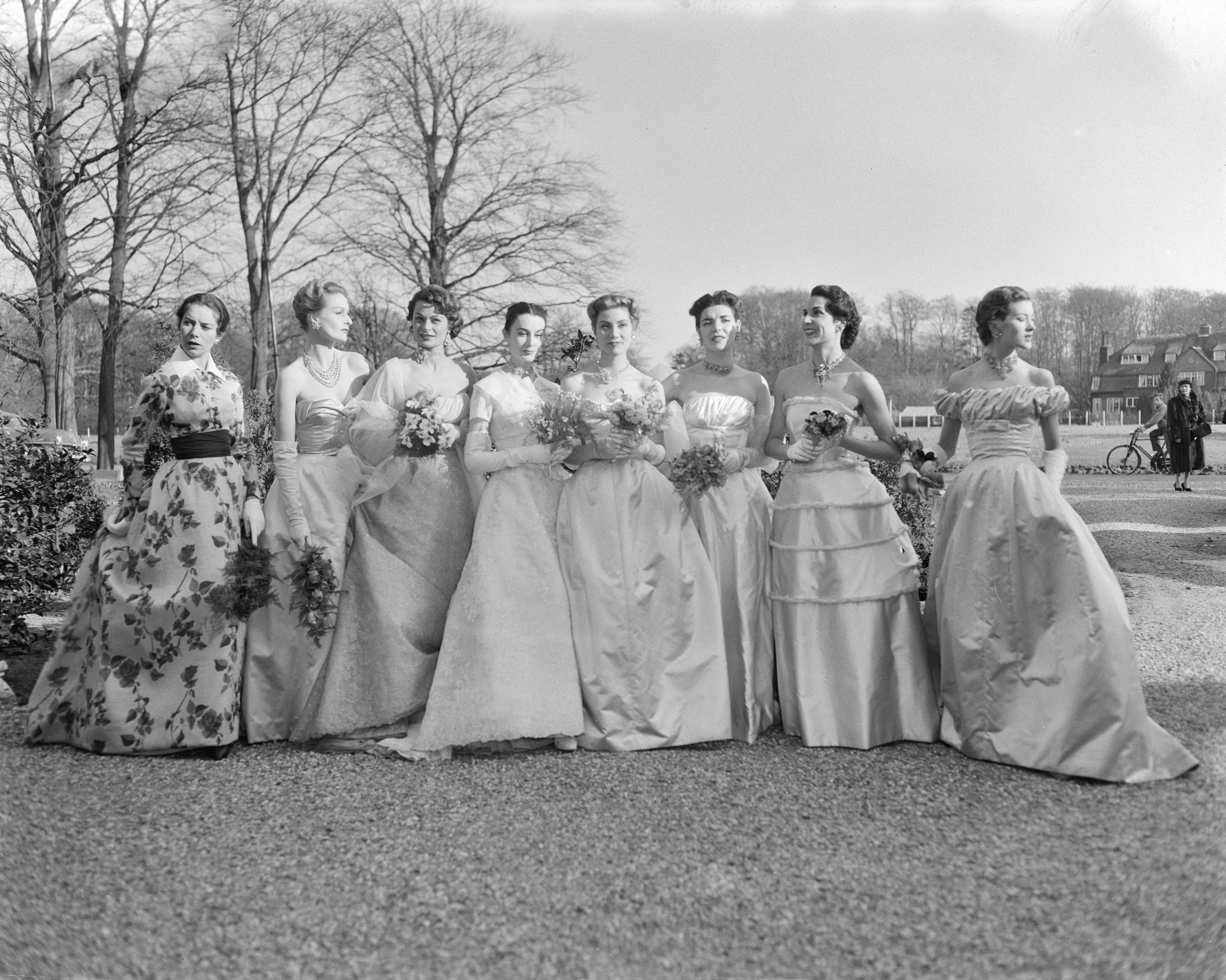
Gowns 1953

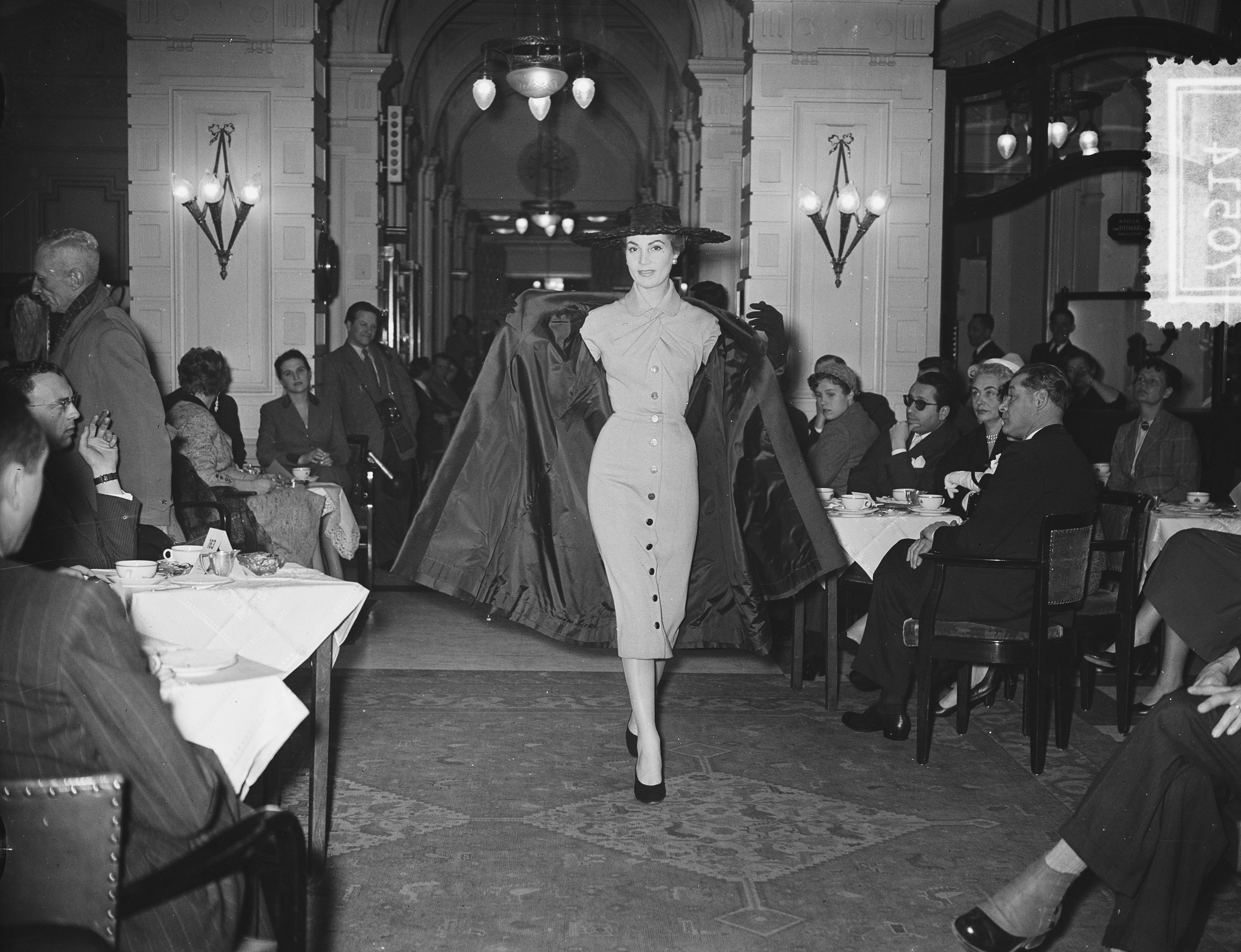
At the House of Fath Show in Amsterdam 1955

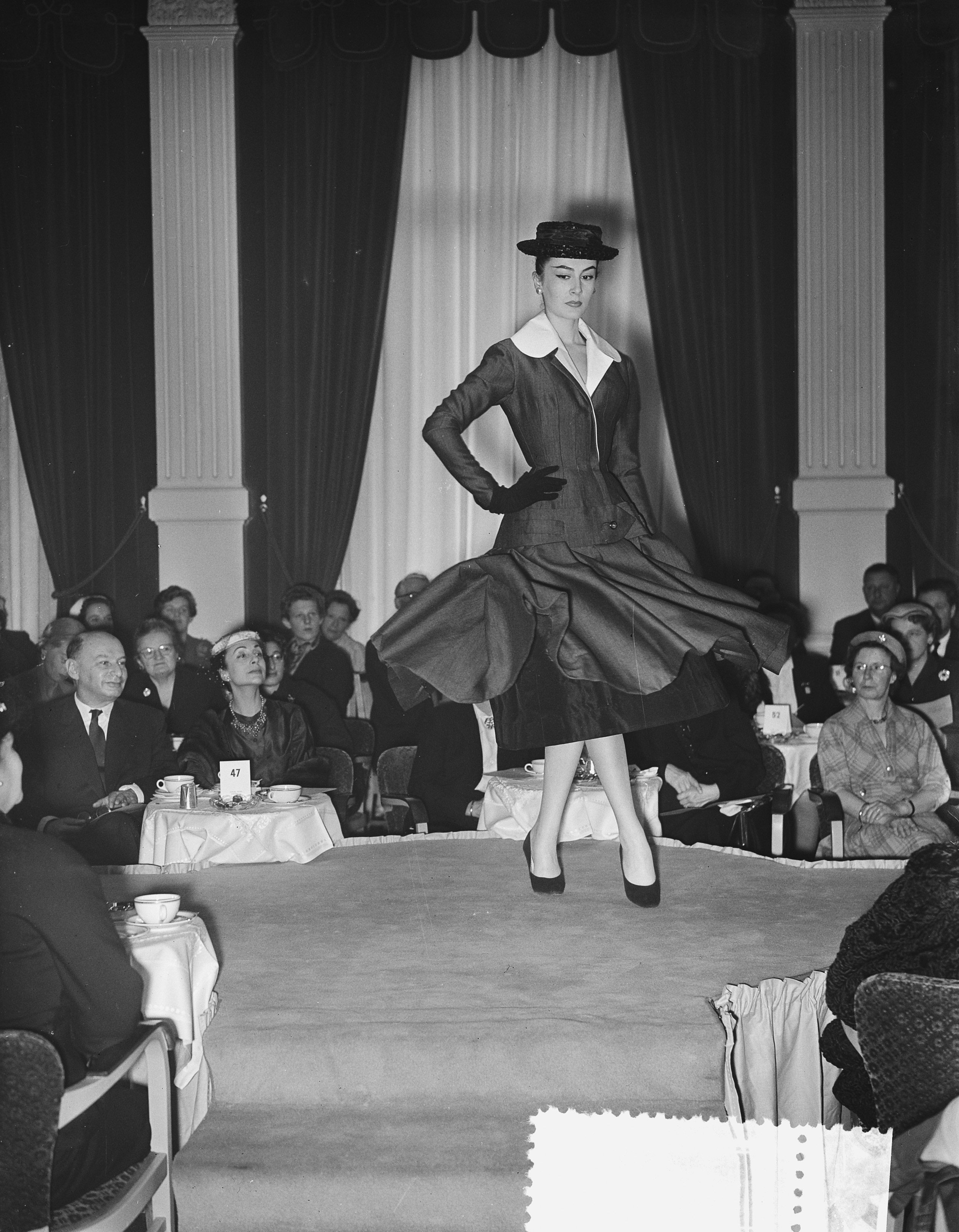
At the Amsterdam show 1955

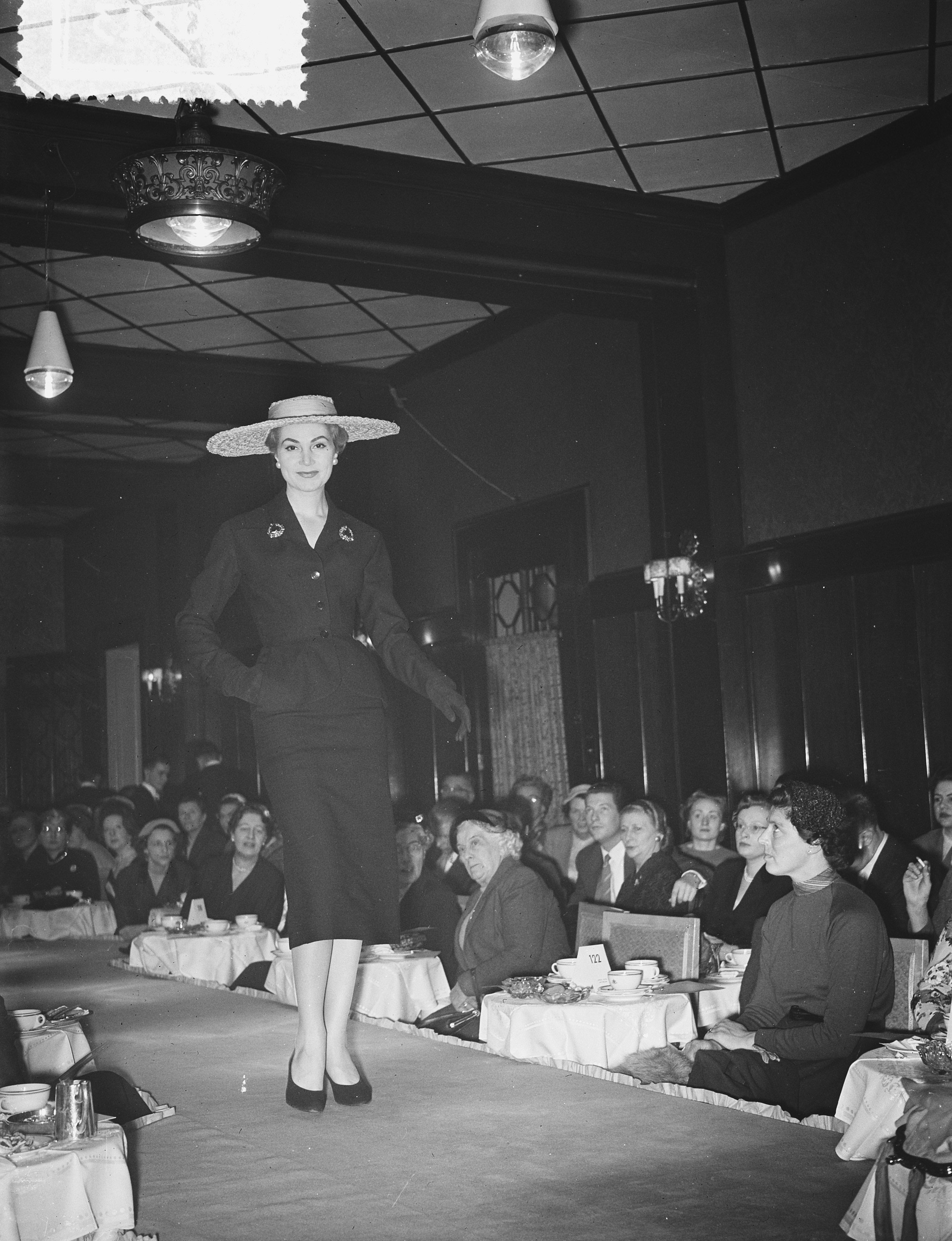
At the Amsterdam show 1955

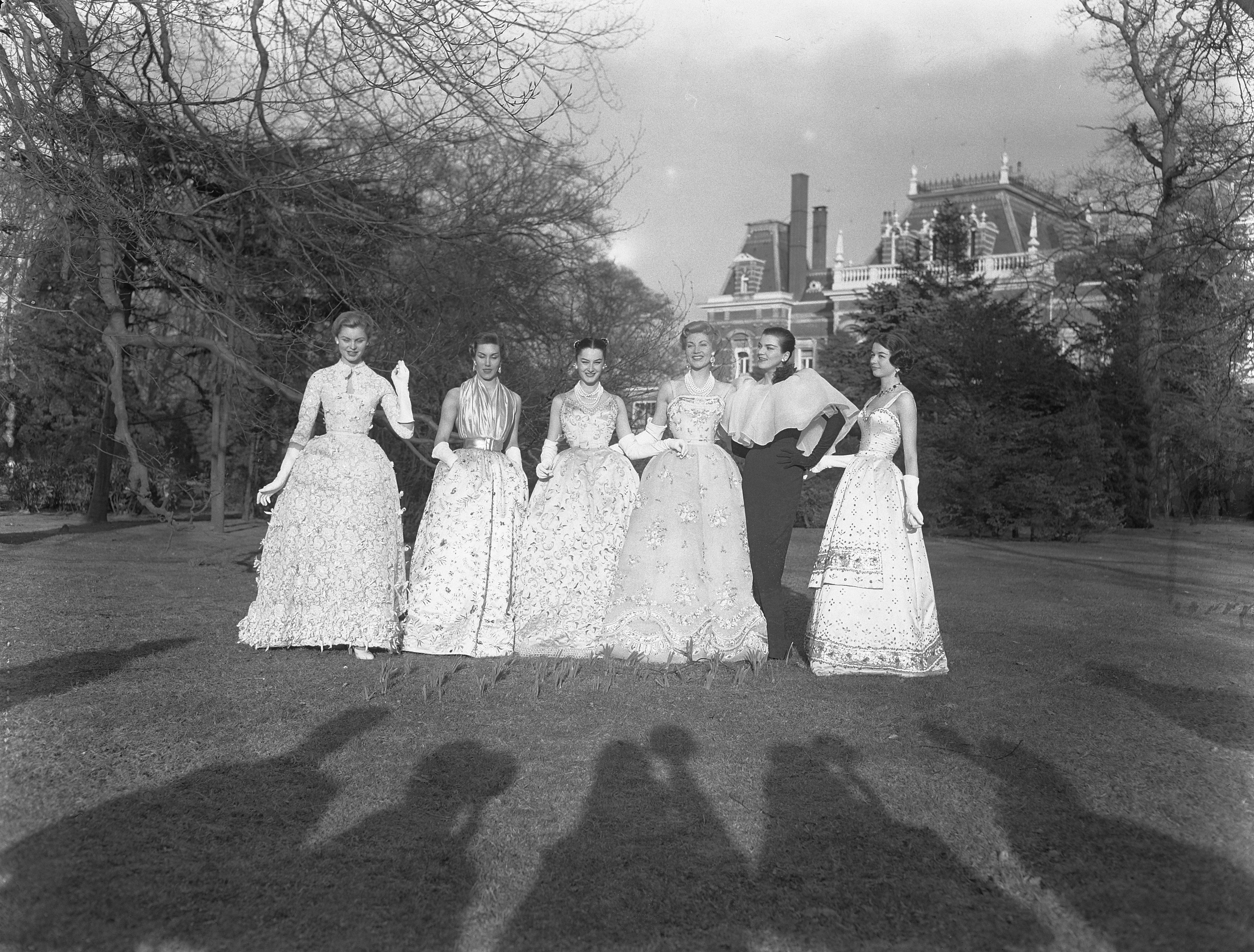
At a 1956 Fashion Show in Wassenaar

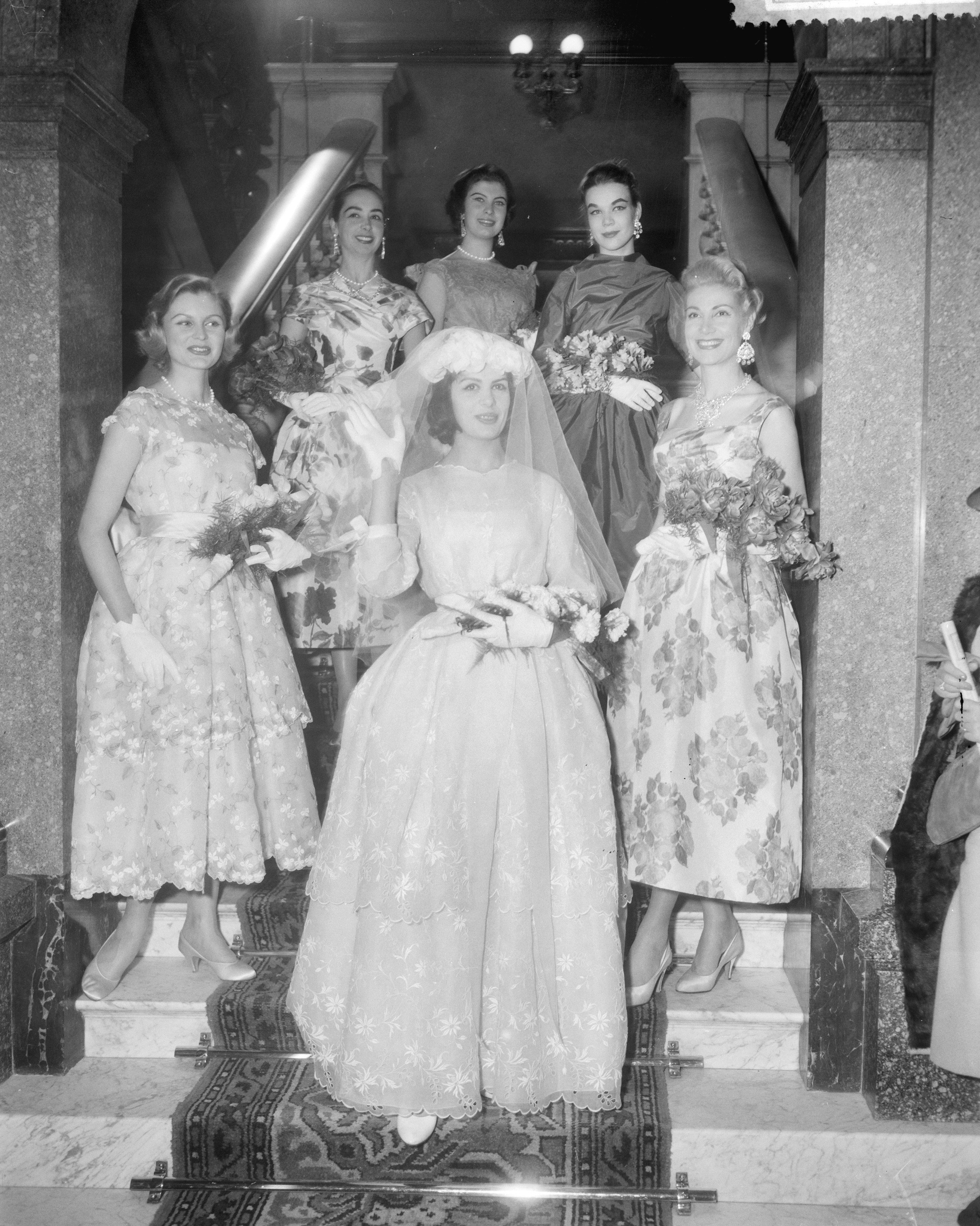
At the Wassenaar show 1956

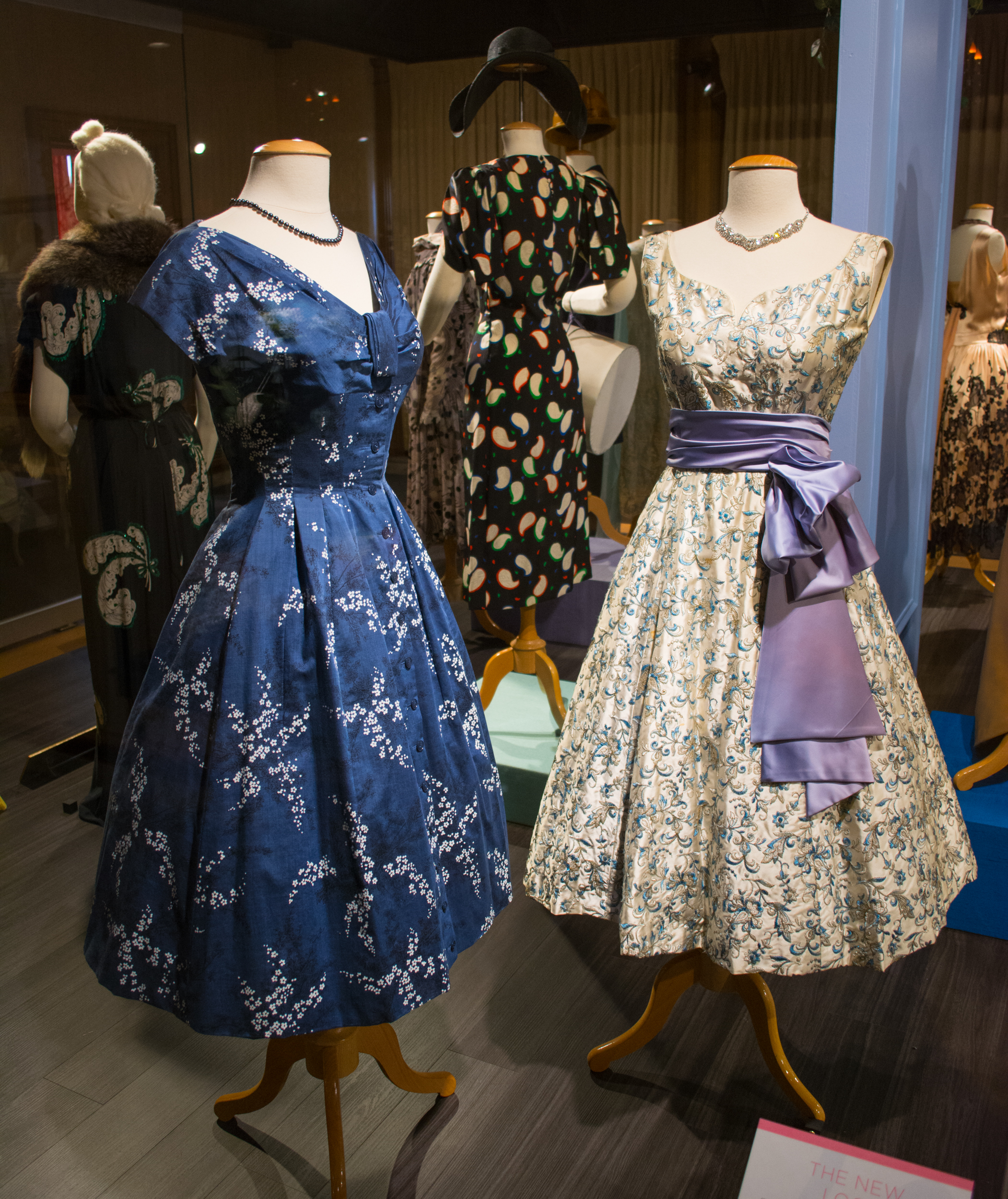
A blue cocktail dress

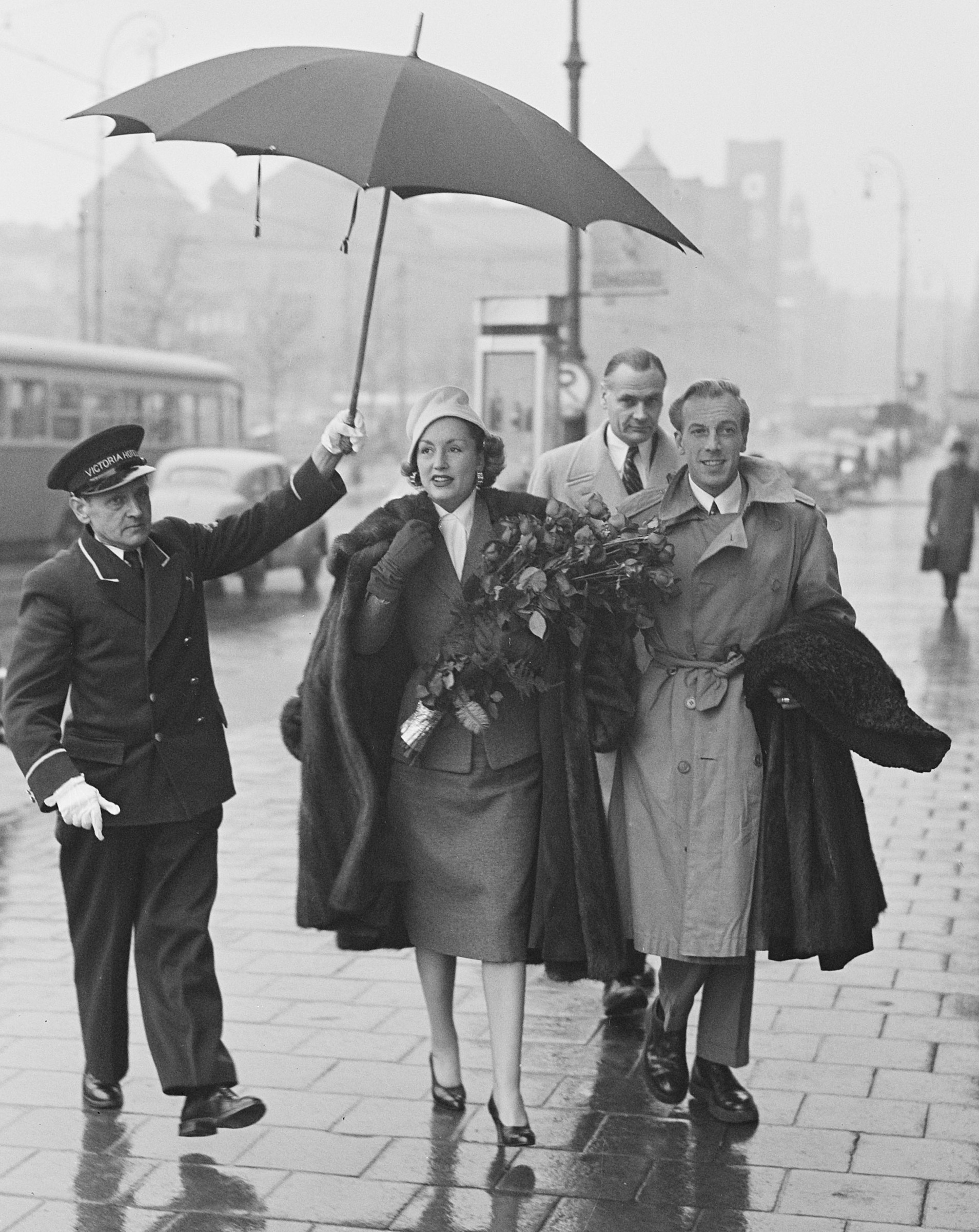
Fath and Giovanna 1953

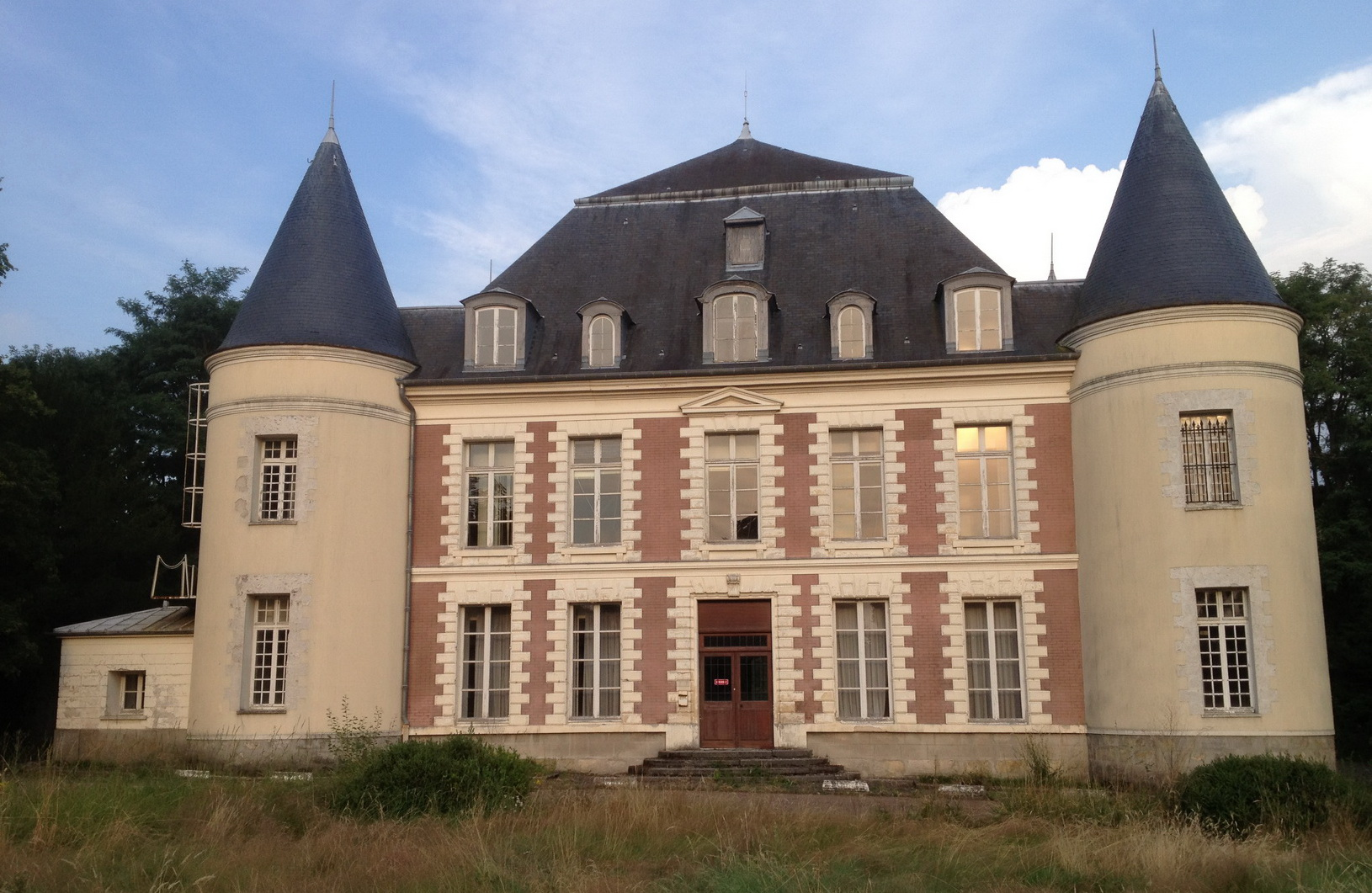
Fath's Home, the Château de Corbeville

== Images ==
- Jacques Fath Collection, Victoria & Albert Museum.
