= Here Is the Beauty =

La Belle que voilà
- Directed by: Jean-Paul Le Chanois
- Written by: Jean-Paul Le Chanois; Françoise Giroud
- Produced by: Ludmilla Goulian
- Starring: Michèle Morgan; Henri Vidal
- Cinematography: Armand Thirard
- Music by: Joseph Kosma
- Production company: Les Films Gibé
- Release date: 1950
- Running time: 120 min
- Country: France
- Language: French

La Belle que voilà (English title: Here Is the Beauty) is a 1950 French drama film directed by Jean-Paul Le Chanois who co-wrote screenplay with Françoise Giroud, based on the novel Die Karriere der Doris Hart by Vicki Baum. The film stars by Michèle Morgan and Henri Vidal.

It depicts the annoyed love between a sculptor and a dancer.

== Cast ==
- Michèle Morgan : Jeanne Morel
- Henri Vidal : Pierre Leroux
- Henri Arius: Tordo, le patron de l'hôtel
- Jean Debucourt : M. de la Brunerie
- Édouard Delmont : Un gardien de prison
- Jean d'Yd : Ceccati
- Marcelle Géniat : Varbara Ostovska
- Bernard Lancret : Edmond Reybaud de la Brunerie
- Léo Lapara : Le chirurgien
- Gérard Oury : Bruno
- Jean Pâqui : Renaud, l'ingénieur
- Ludmilla Tchérina : Mireille Oslava
- Jean Témerson : Théophile
- Harriet Toby: Tania
