= Elena Nazaroff =

Elena Nazaroff (born 10 July 1969) was one of the founders of "Ev & El" during the 90s.

In 1997, she worked as design director at the House of Jacques Fath in Paris.

== Early years ==
Elena was born and raised in Moscow, Soviet Union. At the age of 19 she immigrated to America.

== Career ==
Her career in fashion began in New York where, after graduating from Parsons School of Design, Elena and another person founded ready-to-wear label EV&EL. Elena's fresh and feminine approach to design, sexy details and innovative silhouettes was an instant hit. With a hip store in the heart of Soho and a small factory in fashion district of New York, Ev&El became one of major 1990s trendsetting brands in New York City. Her client list included such names as Prince, Mariah Carey, Ivanka Trump and Drew Barrymore, as well as the television shows Melrose Place and Beverly Hills 90210.

Following her success at Ev&El Elena accepted the position of Creative Director at the legendary Parisian Couture House Jacques Fath. She is first Russian designer to be a head of Paris Couture House.

After just one season Elena branched out on her own again. She founded Elena Nazaroff Design and based herself out of a Parisian Atelier, where she dressed French society, celebrities and the European elite. Later expanding to Los Angeles and continued her custom work, this time catering to the entertainment industry. Her outstanding designs, which so uniquely combined glamour and functionality won her the Venus Award as Best New Designer in 1996, and CFDA nomination as Best New Designer in 1997.

In 1997, CNN named her one of the most influential designers of the century, and her creations were featured in Vogue, Cosmopolitan, Elle, VSD, L'Officiel, Gala and many other fashion publications around the world.

In early 2000 Elena became increasingly conscious about an environmental issues and founded her own line of consciously sourced and eco-friendly street-wear “Eternal Source” and collaborated with well-known denim companies to farther her efforts in conscious fashion.

In 2009 Elena once again returned to High Fashion and New York where she worked as Design Director for Mario Moya, and Zac Posen. After two years she made a decision to relocate to Europe to be closer to her parents and dedicate full-time to her young son.

In the last couple of years she explored Architectural and environmental design. Collaborate with start-ups who promote conscious fashion and life style, through this transition she became a cross-disciplinary designer. Her design projects to date have included product design and development, concepts, and interiors. She now designs across all fields and allows innovation, progress and sustainability to be her driving force.

Elena recently created and patented two fashion-tech startups Metamorfus & ShoeApp which were launched in 2017.
