= Bloch MB.160 =

1930s French airliner

MB.160
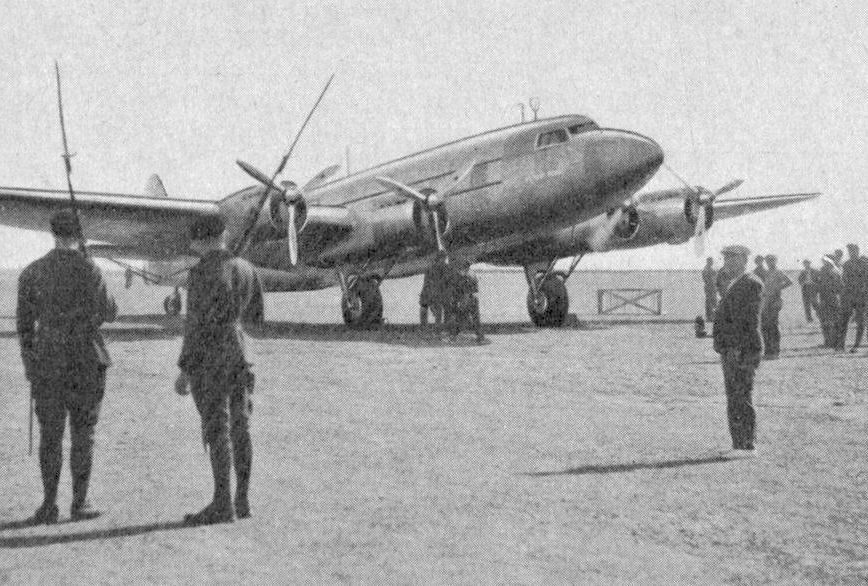

General information
- Type: Airliner
- National origin: France
- Manufacturer: Société des Avions Marcel Bloch
- Number built: 3

History
- First flight: 18 June 1937
- Variants: Bloch MB.162; Sud-Est SE.161 Languedoc

The Bloch MB.160 was a fourteen-seat French airliner intended for use in the French African colonies. Three were built and two entered service with Régie Air-Afrique at the start of World War II. Developments included the Bloch MB.162 bomber which was too late for service and the Sud-Est SE.161 Languedoc, one hundred of which were built post-war.

== Development ==
The first flight of the Bloch MB.160 was on 18 June 1937, piloted by André Curvale at Villacoublay, Marcel Bloch's base.

On 20 August, now named the Lieutenant-Génin, it was one of thirteen aircraft from three countries (France, Italy and the UK) to take part in a 6,190 km (3,850 mi) race from France to Syria and back, flying from Istres to Damascus and returning to Paris. Nine finished, with Italian Savoia-Marchetti SM.79s in the first three places; the Bloch, piloted by Captain François, was seventh, taking 17h 38 min at an average speed of 273 km/h (170 mph).

On 17 October the MB.160 set a new world speed record for an aircraft carrying a 5,000 kg (11,000 lb) useful load over 2,000 km (1,200 mi), averaging 307.455 km/h (191.044 mph; 166.012 kn).

By March 1938 it had completed testing at Marignane and had returned to Villacoublay for minor aileron alterations and for some internal revision. By this time a second example was under way. As late as November 1938 one Bloch MB.160 was back for further modifications to the wing. In July 1939 the first of two delivered to Air-Afrique (only the second and third Bloch 160s appeared on the French civil register) had completed its exploration flights, with passengers, in Algeria.

Though only three MB.160s were built a development of it, the MB.161, was the pre-war prototype of the Sud-Est SE.161 Languedoc. Its first flight was in September 1939; one hundred of them were built post-war. The Languedoc had a 7% greater span, twin end plate fins and a slightly shorter fuselage. 1,150 hp (860 kW) Gnome-Rhône 14N44/45 radial engines replaced the Hispano-Suizas in the prototype but production aircraft had 890 kW (1,200 hp) Pratt & Whitney R-1830-92 Twin Wasp radials.

The MB.162 was the final MB.160 variant, initially developed for long range flights but flown as a bomber. Like the MB.161, it had twin fins and Gnome-Rhône 14N engines. Only one was built, making its first flight on 1 June 1940.

== Design ==
The all-metal Bloch MB.160 was designed to meet the needs of Régie Air-Afrique on its routes between French colonies in Africa.

It was a four engine, cantilever low wing monoplane. In plan the wing was triangular apart from elliptical tips, with sweep only on the leading edge. It had three parts, a centre section that extended just past the outer engines and carried split flaps which continued under the fuselage, and two outer sections with trailing edges largely occupied by balanced ailerons. The wing had two longerons on each side, the forward ones parallel to the leading edge and the rear at right angles to the fuselage. These were bound together in the centre section by a trellis of box-girders. The wing skin was stressed Vedal sheet, flush riveted together.

The Bloch MB.160 was powered by four 540 kW (720 hp) Hispano-Suiza 12Xirs.1 V-12 engines. They were water-cooled with oval radiators immediately behind the propeller disc and were mounted well ahead of the leading edge, enclosed in cowlings which extended a little way aft of the leading edge. Their fuel was in centre section tanks.

It had an oval section fuselage formed by a series of frames and bulkheads, joined by longerons and covered in stressed Vedal. The four crew, two pilots, a flight engineer and a radio operator, worked together in a well-glazed cockpit linked by a corridor to the passengers' cabin. Their accommodation was configurable but the Air-Afrique layout provided chaise-longues/couchettes for ten and armchairs for four. With a pair of armchairs in the place of each chaise-longue, twenty-four passenger might have been carried. At the rear of the cabin there was a bar, toilets and, behind them, a baggage compartment.

The MB.160 had conventional empennage, with the tailplane and elevators mounted near the top of the fuselage. Together, they were tapered and round tipped; the elevators, like the rudder, had trim tabs. The latter was straight-edged and balanced. Though it extended to the keel, it was hinged non-vertically so was far enough back to clear the elevators. The fin was essentially triangular. All the rear surfaces had steel internal structures rather like those of the wing.

It had retractable conventional landing gear mounted just behind the leading edge of the wing under the inner engines and hydraulically retracting into their nacelles between the engine and the forward wing spar. This produced a track of 5.25 m (17 ft 3 in). Each undercarriage unit carried a single low pressure wheel, equipped with a brake, between two oleo-pneumatic legs. There was a fork-mounted tailwheel.

== Variants ==
MB.160
3 built.
MB.161
Prototype of the SE.161 Languedoc. Similar to MB.160 but with twin fins, Gnome-Rhône 14N44/45 radial engines and revised dimensions. 33 passengers, 100 built postwar with Pratt & Whitney R-1830 Twin Wasps.
MB.162
Designed as long range variant of MB.160, with twin fins, shorter fuselage and Gnome-Rhône 14N. Built as a heavy bomber but only 1 completed.

== Operators ==
- Régie Air-Afrique

== Specifications (MB.160) ==
Data from Les Ailes January 1938

General characteristics

- Crew: Four,:pilot, co-pilot/navigator, flight engineer and radio-operator
- Capacity: Up to twenty-four passengers, depending on configuration
- Length: 26.50 m (86 ft 11 in)
- Wingspan: 27.40 m (89 ft 11 in)
- Height: 4.90 m (16 ft 1 in)
- Wing area: 105 m^{2} (1,130 sq ft)
- Empty weight: 9,400 kg (20,723 lb)
- Gross weight: 14,500 kg (31,967 lb)
- Powerplant: 4 × Hispano-Suiza 12Xirs.1 liquid-cooled upright V-12, geared down, 540 kW (720 hp) each at 2,200 m (7,200 ft)
- Propellers: 3-bladed Hamilton

Performance

- Maximum speed: 355 km/h (221 mph, 192 kn) at 2,100 m (6,900 ft)
- Cruise speed: 310 km/h (190 mph, 170 kn) at 2,000 m (6,600 ft)
- Range: 1,700 km (1,100 mi, 920 nmi) with fourteen seats
- Service ceiling: 5,800 m (19,000 ft) practical
