= Octavio Pizarro =

Chilean and French fashion designer

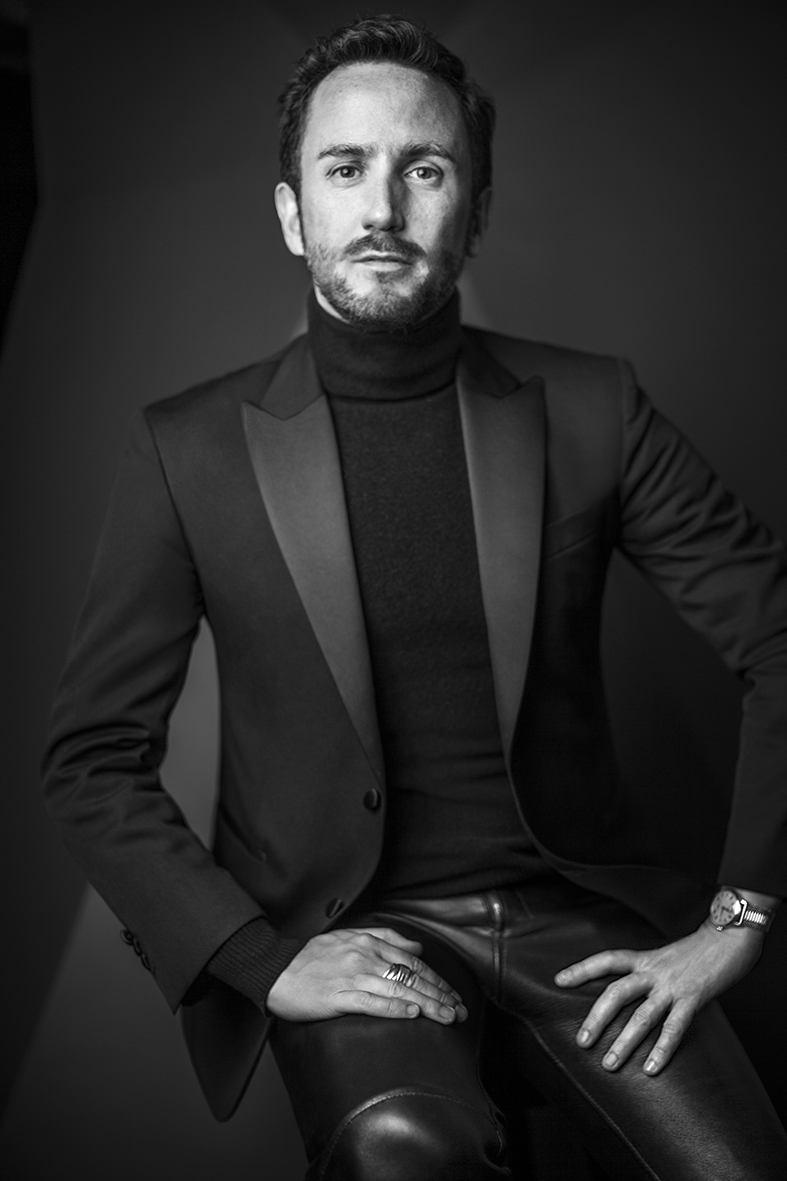
Octavio Pizarro

Octavio Pizarro is a Franco-Chilean creator born in Santiago, Chile. He studied visual arts at the Museum of Fine Arts, design at the school of fine arts of Santiago and at the Ecole de la Chambre Syndicale de la Couture Parisienne. After being the artistic director of Jacques Fath, he became designer for Guy Laroche. In 2006, he launched his own collection of textile accessories. His eponymous collection of ready-to-wear was created in 2011.

== Biography ==
When he was still a child, Octavio Pizarro realized he had a passion for drawing, painting and fashion. After having graduated in Visual Arts at the Museum of Fine Arts and in Fashion Design and Manufacturing at the Fine Arts School f Santiago, he settled in Paris in order to accomplish his dreams. He then graduated in design at the Ecole de la Chambre Syndicale de la Couture Parisienne.

He started out in 1997 as first assistant at Jean-Louis Scherrer Couture House. From 1998 to 2003, he worked at Jacques Fath's as artistic director. He developed the different collections of ready-to-wear and couture and launched a new line of accessories. The brand codes were transformed and galvanized. From 2003 to 2005, he takes on Guy Laroche's ready-to-wear collection. He reinvented the collections and dedicated himself mainly to the techniques of drapery.

In 2006, he launches his own line of accessories and creates, amongst other things, luxurious alpaca scarves using ancestral techniques from the Andean plateaus. He reinvents scarves, wraps, capes and ponchos. All of his designs are inspired by the work of stitches and knitting. He wraps women up in the finest and most valued wool. « I like the idea of a woman wrapped up, nestled in my designs. » the designer declares. One article described his scarves as being « the most beautiful in the world ». His line of accessories is sold worldwide.

Between 2006 and 2007, he created a collection of scarves that was noticed by Loulou de la Falaise. In addition, one of his wedding gowns was chosen in 2007 to be exhibited next to Jean-Paul Gaultier's and Dior's models at the Fashion Museum of Santiago. In 2008, he opened his first couture showroom-studio at Santiago in Chile.

His eponymous ready-to-wear collection is born in 2011 and shown for the first time at the Joyce Gallery at the Palais Royal in Paris. For three seasons, Octavio Pizarro is chosen by the French Federation of Couture to present his collections at the “Designers Apartment” showroom. He also made his collections well-known as a guest during the Catwalks of Budapest, Puerto Rico and in Santiago, Chile. In July 2015 he displayed his collection of ready-to-wear couture at the House of South America in Paris during Couture Fashion Week.

November 2015, Octavio Pizarro has been rewarded with the “Grand Prix de la Création” of the City of Paris in partnership with the French Federation of Prêt à Porter Féminin for his outstanding work especially for his knitting work.

On April 21, 2016, Octavio Pizarro has launched his first capsule collection for the Falabella Department Store Group in Chile under the label « Octavio Pizarro pour Basement édition limitée ». The autumn/winter 2016 collection encompasses tailored pieces in the designer’s signature colour black, with touches of white and red, as well as original beautiful knitwear pieces. Octavio Pizarro has headed the Artistic Direction on every major step of the project including the design of the Advertising campaigns, the shopfit of the corners, the design of the POS materials along with the promotion of the project with the press. The evening launch event occurred in the Alto Las Condes privatised store in partnership with Caras Magazine. The models showed 28 original pieces to 300 guests including the Chilean socialite crowd, the major press journalist and press stylists. The collection is distributed in the 4 main Santiago Falabella stores, Alto las Codes, Parque Arauco, La Dehesa and Costanera Center.

== Style ==
It is during his trips in the north of Chile and Peru that Octavio Pizarro got interested in Alpaca wool and its blending with other material. This traditional material in link with his cultural roots will then be the object of his aesthetic researches. He is one of the first fashion designers to use it for his creations. He discovered two ways to work the wool: handmade in order to enhance the authentic aspect of traditional work around wool; and using Jacquard and incrustation to skilfully sculpt the body with perfect finishing touches. He likes playing around with the contrast between material and techniques. He is looking for « mixing the extremes ». Thus, we can see Alpaca wool incrusted with Swarovski crystals, the mix between leather and fur. The chic and the look of his lines are reinforced by the play on the geometric shapes, the graphic prints and transparencies

== See also ==
- Diane Pernet
