= Bloch MB.162 =

1940s French bomber aircraft

MB.162
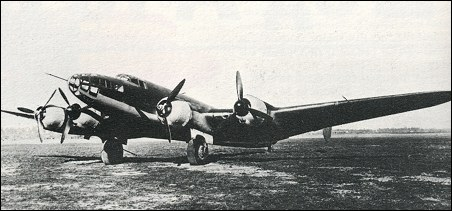

General information
- Type: Heavy Bomber
- National origin: France
- Manufacturer: Société des Avions Marcel Bloch
- Primary user: Luftwaffe
- Number built: 1

History
- Introduction date: 1943
- First flight: 1 June 1940
- Developed from: Bloch MB.161

The Bloch MB.162 was a French four-engine, long-range bomber developed by Société des Avions Marcel Bloch in the late 1930s. Only one prototype was built; after capture by German forces, it was pressed into service with the Luftwaffe as a transport.

== Development ==
The designation MB.162 was originally applied to a long-range derivative of the MB.160 four-engined colonial airliner, to be powered by four Gnome-Rhône 14P engines. While intended for use as a mail plane and long-range communication aircraft, the "MB.162 Raid" was planned to take part in the 1937 Istres–Damascus–Paris Air Race, and when slow development meant that it could not be completed in time to compete in the race, development was abandoned, with the first prototype MB.160 being entered in its place.

The MB.162 01 bomber prototype first flew in June 1940 and was captured subsequent to the Armistice. Had the MB.162 entered production in 1941 as planned, it would have been a notable and fast heavy bomber for the French, somewhat analogous to the B-17 but much faster and less well-armed.

== Operational history ==
The MB.162 did not fly a single combat mission, nor did the MB.162 B.5 production model ever enter production. The prototype was used by the Luftwaffe in I/KG 200 for clandestine affairs during 1943–1944.

== Variants ==
MB.160:

civil transport prototype with smaller span, longer, single central fin. Three built.
MB.161
produced postwar as airliner SE.161 Languedoc. 100 built
MB.162 Raid
Long-range mailplane version
MB.162.01
prototype, one built
MB.162 Bn.5
Production model - never produced

== Military operators ==
France

- Armee de l'Air (postwar)

Germany

- Luftwaffe

== Specifications (MB.162 B5) ==
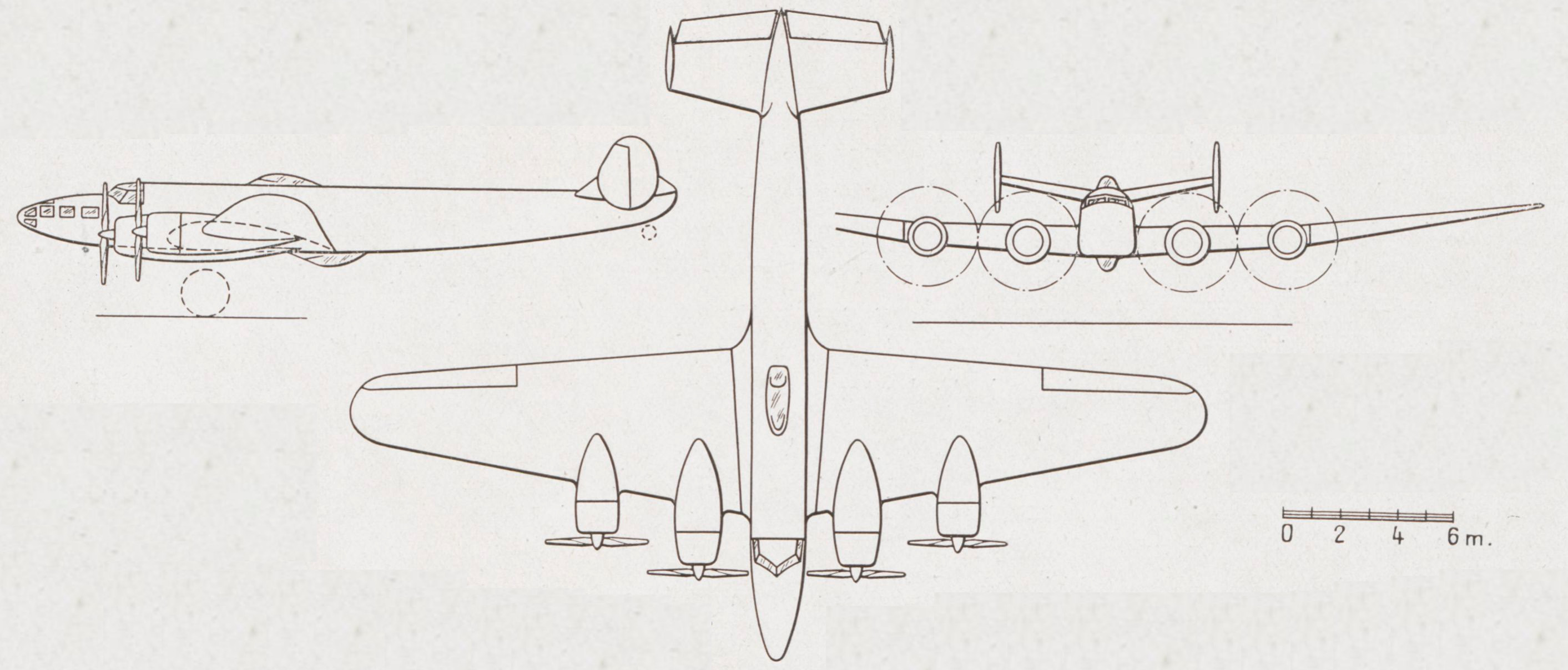
3-views of the Bloch MB.162 B5.

Data from War Planes of the Second World War: Volume Seven

General characteristics

- Crew: 5
- Length: 21.91 m (71 ft 11 in)
- Wingspan: 28.1 m (92 ft 2 in)
- Height: 3.76 m (12 ft 4 in)
- Wing area: 109 m^{2} (1,170 sq ft)
- Empty weight: 11,890 kg (26,213 lb)
- Gross weight: 19,040 kg (41,976 lb)
- Powerplant: 2 × Gnome-Rhône 14N-48 14-cylinder two-row air-cooled radial engine, 820 kW (1,100 hp) each LH rotation
- Powerplant: 2 × Gnome-Rhône 14N-49 14-cylinder two-row air cooled radial engine, 820 kW (1,100 hp) each RH rotation
- Propellers: 3-bladed variable-pitch propellers

Performance

- Maximum speed: 551 km/h (342 mph, 298 kn) at 5,500 m (18,000 ft)
- Range: 2,399 km (1,491 mi, 1,295 nmi)
- Service ceiling: 9,000 m (30,000 ft)
- Time to altitude:

- 2,000 m (6,600 ft) 5 minutes 48 seconds
- 5,000 m (16,000 ft) in 18 minutes

- Wing loading: 175 kg/m^{2} (36 lb/sq ft)
- Power/mass: 0.17 kW/kg (0.10 hp/lb)

Armament

- Guns: 2 × 7.5 mm (.295 in) MAC 1934 machine guns in nose and ventral positions
- 2 × 20 mm Hispano-Suiza HS.404 cannon in ventral and dorsal positions
- Bombs: 3,600 kg (7,937 lb) of bombs

== See also ==
Related development

- SNCASE Languedoc

Related lists

- List of aircraft of the French Air Force during World War II

== Bibliography ==
- Green, William (1967). War Planes of the Second World War: Bombers and Reconnaissance Aircraft. Vol. VII. London: Macdonald. OCLC 1044981058.
- Ricco, Phillipe (December 2012 – January 2013). "Le Bloch 162". Aero Journal (in French). No. 32. pp. 60–65. ISSN 1962-2430.
