= Harriet Toby =

American ballerina

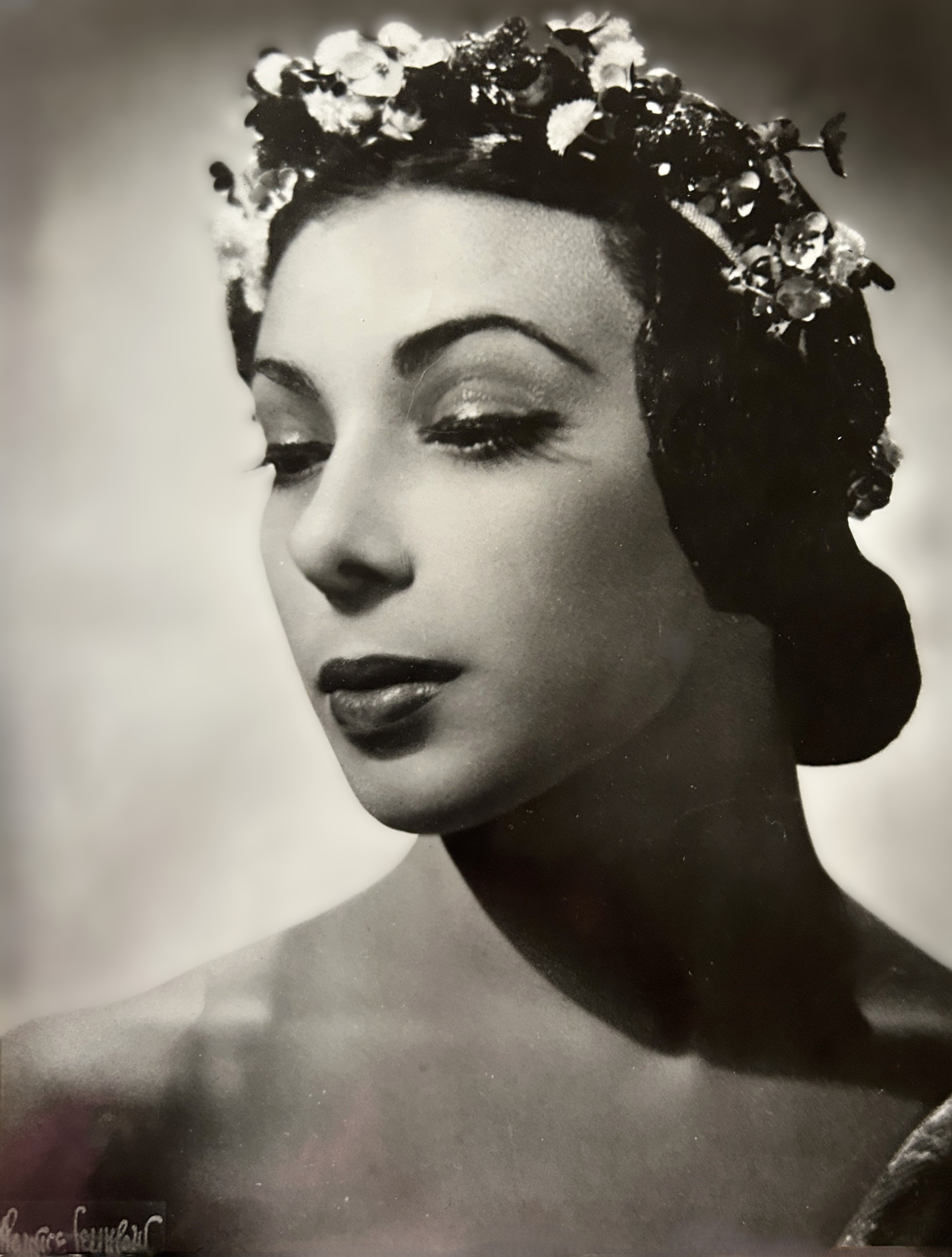
- Harriet Toby, American ballerina, in a publicity photo by Maurice Seymour, 1951.
- Born: Harriet Joan Katzman; December 12, 1929
- Died: March 3, 1952 (aged 22); Nice, France
- Burial place: Cimetière du Père-Lachaise
- Occupation: Ballerina
- Years active: 1944 - 1952

Harriet Toby (born Harriet Joan Katzman; December 12, 1929 – March 3, 1952) was an American ballerina who died in a plane crash at the age of 22. In a 1951 column for the New York Herald Tribune, Art Buchwald described her as “one of the youngest top-flight ballerinas in the business.” Dance critic Gérard Mannoni described her as “beautiful and technically strong” and regarded her as “one of the great hopes of international dance”—a testament to her remarkable talent and promise in the world of ballet.

== Early life ==
Harriet Toby was born in Brooklyn, New York, and was given the name Harriet Joan by her American parents, Toby and Abraham Katzman. In 1932, the family relocated to Paris, France, where she began studying ballet at the age of eight under Alexandre Volinine, a Russian dancer who had been a premier danseur noble with the Bolshoi Ballet and Anna Pavlova’s most famous partner. Volinine later established one of the leading ballet schools in Paris.

In 1940, as World War II intensified and German forces advanced to within 125 miles of Paris, 10-year-old Harriet Toby and her parents and sister, Renée, were forced to flee the city. Abandoning all of their possessions, they joined the mass exodus of civilians escaping the Nazi onslaught. In a long convoy of cars, packed tightly bumper to bumper, the family traveled south toward the border. They ultimately crossed into Spain by way of Hendaye, France, narrowly evading the German occupation.

== Ballet career ==
After returning to New York City, Toby enrolled at the Professional Children’s School and continued her ballet studies at the School of American Ballet, founded by Lincoln Kirstein and George Balanchine. There, she trained under famed Russian dancers Ludmilla Schollar and Anatole Vilzak.

On December 7, 1944, she made her first professional appearance—credited as Harriet Katzman—in the Broadway musical The Seven Lively Arts at the Ziegfeld Theater, performing alongside Alicia Markova and Anton Dolin. By 1945, she had adopted her mother’s given name as her stage surname and became known professionally as Harriet Toby. In 1945, she began dancing with the Ballet Russe de Monte-Carlo, touring with the troupe until 1949. In 1948, the Ballet Russe de Monte-Carlo performed the Ruth Page (ballerina) and Bentley Stone ballet Frankie and Johnny with Toby as Frankie at the New York City Center.

After the end of World War II, Toby returned to Paris with her parents, who resumed their business there. She joined Roland Petit and his Ballets de Paris. She appeared as Tanya in the French film La Belle que voilà, released in 1950, in which she both danced and acted. In 1949, she began performing with the Grand Ballet du Marquis de Cuevas (formed by Jorge Cuevas Bartholín, known as George de Cuevas), touring across Europe, North America, and North Africa. She quickly rose to prominence as one of the company’s principal soloists, performing in Les Biches, Del amor y de la Muerte and David Lichine’s Le Moulin Enchanté, often dancing alongside Serge Golovine. Toby made her final New York City appearance with the Marquis de Cuevas company at the Century Theatre, where she danced the central role in George Balanchine’s Concerto Barocco to critical acclaim, earning praise from The New York Times.

== Circumstances of death ==
Toby might have escaped death that day, but as some of her colleagues noted, “she had put her slippers on the table!”—a gesture considered bad luck in the ballet world. The Marquis de Cuevas troupe had departed the Côte d’Azur by train in route to a performance in Brussels. All members took the train—except Toby. Hoping to reach Paris early for a day of shopping, she chose to fly instead.

On March 3, 1952, Toby and 36 others were killed when their Air France flight from Nice crashed shortly after takeoff near the Saint-Augustin station, narrowly missing nearby homes. Initially thought to have struck a flock of migratory birds—seagull feathers and wings were found in the engines—a later investigation determined the cause to be mechanical failure. It was traced to a design flaw in the aircraft a SNCASE SE.161 Languedoc

One passenger survived the initial impact but died shortly after at the hospital; before her death, she described panic and confusion aboard the aircraft in its final moments.

At the Nice cemetery where the victims’ coffins were laid out, a personal representative of the Aga Khan III (Sir Sultan Muhammad Shah) arrived to place flowers on Toby’s coffin. The Aga Khan, a devoted ballet lover, had frequently attended performances in which Toby danced leading roles with the Marquis de Cuevas Ballet Company.

In a final irony, Toby’s last performance—on the night before her death—was in the Spanish ballet Del amor y de la muerte (Of Love and Death).

== Burial and monument ==
Harriet Toby is buried in Paris, at Cimetière du Père-Lachaise. Her grave is marked by a stele featuring a marble bas-relief depicting her as a ballerina; the sculptor is unknown. She is interred in Division 88 of the cemetery.
