= 1951 Misrair SNCASE Languedoc crash =

Aviation accident in Iran

Coordinates: 35°41′21″N 51°18′49″E

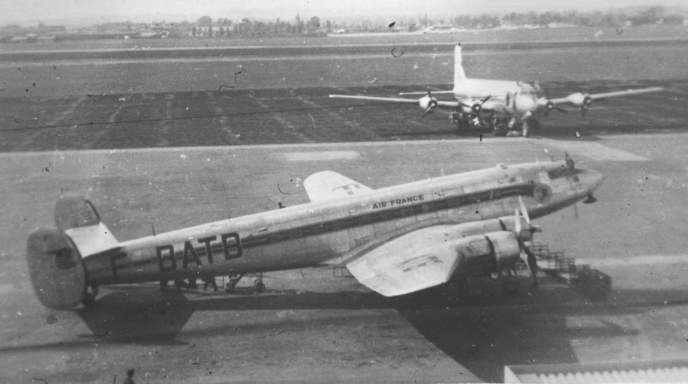
- SNCASE Languedoc of Air France, similar to the accident aircraft

Accident
- Date: 22 December 1951
- Summary: Weather
- Site: Tehran, Iran

Aircraft
- Aircraft type: SNCASE Languedoc
- Operator: Misrair
- Registration: SU-AHH
- Flight origin: Baghdad Airport, Iraq
- Destination: Tehran Airport, Iran
- Occupants: 22
- Passengers: 18
- Crew: 4
- Fatalities: 22
- Survivors: 0

On 22 December 1951 a SNCASE Languedoc four-engined airliner of Misrair operating an international scheduled passenger flight from Baghdad Airport, Iraq to Tehran, Iran crashed whilst attempting to land at Tehran Airport during a snowstorm. All 22 people on board were killed.

== Aircraft ==
The aircraft was SNCASE Languedoc msn 41, registration SU-AHH.

== Accident ==
The aircraft, operating an international scheduled passenger flight from Baghdad Airport, Iraq to Tehran Airport was reported to have crashed 10 nautical miles (19 km) west of Tehran in a snowstorm. All five crew and fifteen passengers on board were killed. The aircraft is reported to have circled Tehran four times before contact was lost with the control tower at about 8pm local time. It was assumed that the aircraft had returned to Baghdad. The wreckage was subsequently discovered the next day in a ravine. Seventeen passengers were listed, but two of them had not boarded the flight in Baghdad. Four members of the Technical Cooperation Administration (TCA), which oversaw the Point Four Program, were killed, including director American Henry G. Bennett.
