= 1952 Air France SNCASE Languedoc crash =

1952 plane crash

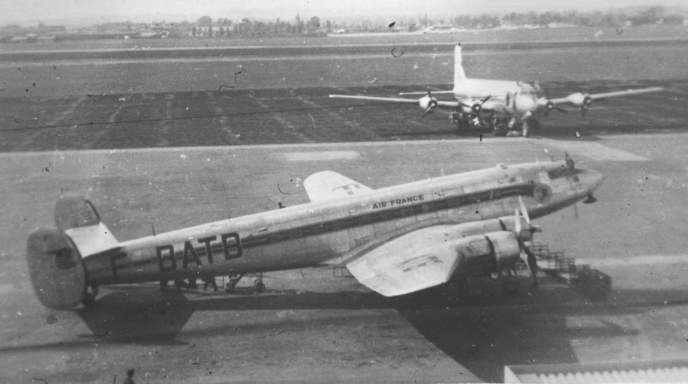
- A SNCASE Languedoc of Air France, similar to the accident aircraft

Accident
- Date: March 3, 1952
- Summary: Jammed controls, design error
- Site: ca 1 km N of Nice-le Var Airport; 43°40′00″N 7°12′28″E

Aircraft
- Aircraft type: SNCASE SE.161/P7 Languedoc
- Operator: Air France
- Registration: F-BCUM
- Flight origin: Tunis-El Aouina Airport (TUN/DTTA), Tunisia
- Stopover: Nice-le Var Airport (NCE/LFMN), Nice
- Destination: Paris-Le Bourget Airport (LBG/LFPB), Paris
- Passengers: 34
- Crew: 4
- Fatalities: 38
- Survivors: 0

The 1952 Air France SNCASE Languedoc crash occurred on 3 March 1952 when a SNCASE SE.161/P7 Languedoc aircraft of Air France crashed on take-off from Nice Airport for Le Bourget Airport, Paris, killing all 38 people on board. The cause of the accident was that the aileron controls had jammed, which in itself was contributed to by a design fault. The accident was the third-deadliest in France at the time and is the deadliest involving the SNCASE Languedoc.

== Aircraft ==
The accident aircraft was a SNCASE SE.161/P7 Languedoc, msn 43, registration F-BCUM. The aircraft was powered by four 1,220-horsepower (910-kilowatt) Pratt & Whitney R-1830 SIC-3-G engines.

== Accident ==
John Emlyn-Jones

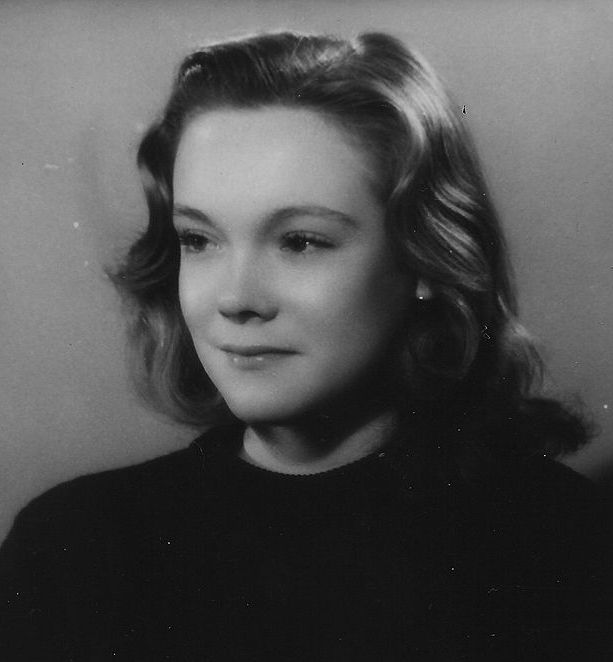
Lise Topart.

Shortly after take-off from Nice Airport on a scheduled domestic passenger flight to Le Bourget Airport, Paris, the aircraft was seen to bank to the left, roll onto its back and crash about 1 kilometre (1,100 yd) north of the airport. All four crew and 34 passengers on board were killed. The flight had originated in Tunis, Tunisia. The accident was the third deadliest in France at the time and is the deadliest involving the SNCASE Languedoc.

Thirteen of the victims were British, including shipowner John Emlyn-Jones and his wife. Amongst the other victims were the French actresses Lise Topart and Michèle Verly and the American actress and ballet dancer Harriet Toby. A Frenchwoman was initially reported to have survived the crash seriously injured, but she died later in hospital, bringing the total to 38 deaths.

== Investigation ==
An investigation found that the cause of the accident was that the co-pilot's aileron controls had jammed due to a chain slipping off its sprocket. The difficulty of setting and inspecting the chains in the dual control columns was cited as a contributory factor in the accident.
