= Lucie Daouphars =

French model (1922–1963)

- Born: 1922
- Died: 1963
- Occupation: Model

Lucie Daouphars (1922–1963) was a French fashion model known as Lucky, who worked extensively for Christian Dior and Jacques Fath. Lucky was Dior's favourite model.
