= SNCASE SE.161 Languedoc =

French four-engined airliner (1946–1964)

SE.161 Languedoc
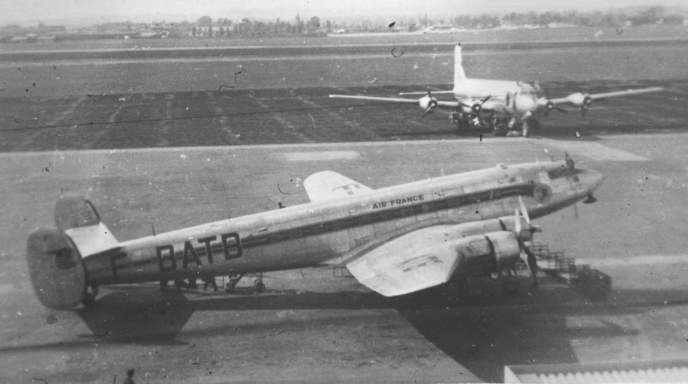
- SE.161 Languedoc of Air France at Paris (Le Bourget) Airport in 1951

General information
- Type: Airliner
- National origin: France
- Manufacturer: SNCASE
- Designer: Marcel Bloch
- Primary users: Air France French Air Force; French Navy
- Number built: 100

History
- Manufactured: 1945–1948
- Introduction date: 1946
- First flight: 15 December 1939
- Retired: 1964
- Developed from: Bloch MB.160

The SNCASE SE.161 Languedoc was a French four-engined airliner produced by SNCASE (Sud-Est). Developed from the Bloch MB.160 and known in the late 1930s as the (SNCASO) Bloch MB.161, the SE.161 was in service with Air France and the French military after World War II.

== Design and development ==
In 1936, Air Afrique needed a new airliner for its African services. Marcel Bloch proposed a development of his Bloch MB.160 aircraft, the Bloch MB.161, which after World War II became the SNCASE SE.161 Languedoc. Design work on the new aircraft began in 1937. The prototype, F-ARTV, first flew on 15 December 1939, shortly after the start of the Second World War. It was powered by four Gnome-Rhône 14N radial engines of 1,020 hp (760 kW) each. The aircraft underwent a slow development programme; test flying was not completed until January 1942. The French Vichy government placed an order for twenty in December 1941, but none were built. The programme was finally abandoned following Allied bombing of the factory at Saint-Martin-du-Touch, Haute-Garonne in 1944.

After the liberation of France the provisional government led by General De Gaulle authorised production of the aircraft, now designated SE.161, to be resumed. The first series production aircraft, registered F-BATA, first flew either on 25 August 1945 or 17 September 1945. An initial batch of 40 aircraft was completed for Air France between October 1945 and April 1948.

The Languedoc was an all-metal four-engined low wing cantilever monoplane airliner with twin fins and rudders. It had a crew of five (pilot, co-pilot/navigator, radio operator, flight engineer and steward) Standard cabin accommodation was for 33 passengers seated in eleven rows of three, two on the starboard and one on the port side. An alternative first class arrangement was for 24 seats. A 44-seat higher-density version was introduced by Air France in 1951.

The Languedoc was fitted with underwing retractable main undercarriage wheels and a tailwheel landing gear, and was powered by four 1,020 hp (760 kW) Gnome-Rhône 14N 44/45 or 54/55 radial engines in wing-leading edge nacelles, with partial convertibility to inline water-cooled pistons.

A total of 100 aircraft were built for Air France, the French Air Force and French Navy. Several examples were utilised as test aircraft with the CEV at Villacoublay and elsewhere. The only export customer for new production aircraft was the Polish airline LOT, which bought five, some being refitted with Pratt & Whitney R-1830 Twin Wasp radial engines.

== Operational history ==
The SE.161 was named the Languedoc before it entered service with Air France on the Paris to Algiers route from 28 May 1946. By October they were withdrawn from service with a number of faults, including landing gear problems, poor view from the cockpit when landing in bad weather and a lack of de-icing equipment and cabin heating. The Gnome Rhône engines also had a very short time between overhauls. They re-entered service in 1947, re-engined with reliable American-built Pratt & Whitney R-1830 engines; also de-icing equipment, medium-range cockpit radios, and limited cabin heating, the designation changing to SE.161.P7. These costly enhancements partially reassured commercial airline customers. The Languedoc was soon a familiar type on Air France's increasing European network and continued to operate scheduled services to London Heathrow, Berlin Tempelhof, Paris Le Bourget and Brussels Melsbroek until summer 1952, when they were steadily replaced by the reliable and popular Douglas DC-4.

The Languedoc was never as reliable as the Douglas DC-4 or the ultra-modern turboprop Vickers Viscount, and many French passengers refused to fly on the unreliable, unheated and noisy aircraft. Air France ultimately sold some of its Languedocs to Air Liban of Lebanon, Misrair of Egypt and Aviaco of Spain. Others were transferred to the French military.

Ten ex-Air France aircraft were converted for operation in the Search and Rescue (SAR) role with SGACC. They were modified with a large ventral gondola, observation windows and a ventral search radar under a transparent fairing, similar to the design adopted in the French Navy SAR Avro Lancasters.

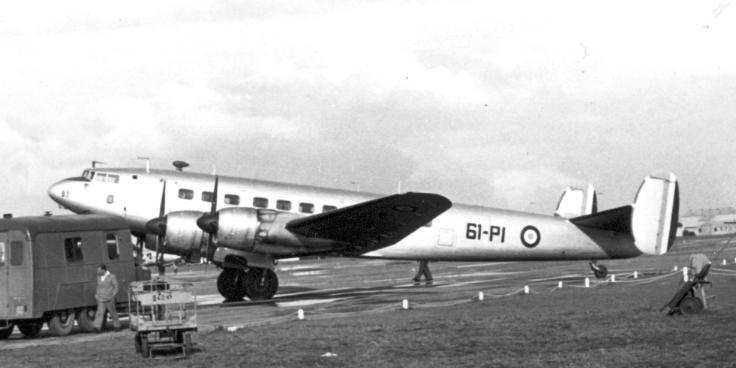
SE.161 Languedoc No. 92 of GT II/61 French Air Force in 1955

The largest military operator was the French Navy, which operated 25 different Languedoc aircraft over the years. The first aircraft were delivered in 1949 and used as long-range transports between Paris, Marseille and Lyon in France, and North Africa. Later aircraft were used as flying classrooms, modified with a nose radar and a ventral "dustbin" radar, for non-pilot aircrew training. The aircraft was withdrawn from Naval service in 1959.

A few Languedocs were used as flying testbeds and mother ships, succeeding the pair of He 274 prototype airframes left behind by the Luftwaffe in 1944 that were partly being used as "mother ships" for high-speed French aerodynamic research aircraft, with four Languedocs being used as mother ships for René Leduc's experimental ramjet aircraft in place of the hard-to-maintain He 274s, which were scrapped in 1953. Languedocs were also used for other types of experimental work including an unsuccessful use as live airborne television relay for Charles de Gaulles's Algerian visit in 1958.

The last Air France Languedoc, now unable to compete with more modern airliners, was withdrawn from domestic service in 1954.

== Accidents and incidents ==
- On 2 April 1943, F-ARTV force-landed and overturned at La Chapelle-Baloue, Creuse with one fatality.
- On 7 October 1947, F-BATY of Air France crashed at Bône, Algeria.
- On 26 January 1948, F-BCUC of Air France crashed at Romainville, Seine-Saint-Denis whilst on a training flight, killing all nine people on board.
- On 4 February 1948, F-BATK of Air France was damaged beyond economical repair at Marignane Airport, Bouches-du-Rhône.
- On 10 February 1948, F-BATH of Air France was damaged beyond economical repair at Orly Airport, Paris. Its fuselage subsequently served for many years as a ground training airframe.
- On 14 June 1948, F-BATG of Air France crashed at Coulommiers - Voisins Aerodrome, Seine-et-Marne.
- On 29 August 1948, F-BATO of Air France crashed at Le Bourget Airport, Paris.
- On 23 November 1948, F-BATM of Air France crashed at Toulouse, Haute-Garonne whilst on a test flight, killing one of the five people on board. The cause of the accident was that the aileron controls had been assembled incorrectly.
- On 9 April 1949, F-BATU of Air France overran the runway at Nice Airport, Alpes-Maritimes and was damaged beyond economic repair.
- On 30 July 1950, F-BCUI of Air France was damaged beyond economic repair when its undercarriage collapsed on landing at Marignane Airport, Marseille.
- On 22 December 1951, SU-AHH of Misrair crashed west of Tehran, Iran killing all 20 people on board. The aircraft was operating an international scheduled passenger flight from Baghdad, Iraq to Tehran.
- on 3 March 1952, F-BCUM of Air France crashed shortly after take-off from Nice Airport killing all 38 people on board. The cause of the accident was that the aileron controls had jammed. The aircraft was operating a domestic scheduled passenger flight from Nice to Orly Airport, Paris.
- On 7 April 1952, F-BATB of Air France was damaged beyond economic repair when it overran the runway on take-off from Le Bourget Airport, Paris. The aircraft was operating an international scheduled passenger flight from Le Bourget to Heathrow Airport, London.
- On 30 July 1952, SU-AHX of Misrair was damaged beyond economic repair in a wheels-up landing at Almaza Air Base, Cairo, Egypt. The aircraft was operating an international scheduled passenger flight from Almaza to Khartoum Airport, Sudan; it returned to Cairo following a fire in No. 1 engine.
- On 23 October 1952, F-RAPC of Aéronavale crashed at Bonneuil en France, Val-d'Oise, killing all eleven people on board.
- On 6 January 1954, OD-ABU of Air Liban crashed on take-off from Bir Hassan Airport, Beirut and was destroyed by fire. The aircraft was operating a scheduled international passenger flight from Beirut to Kuwait Airport, Kuwait.
- On 24 April 1954, SU-AHZ of Misrair was written off at Damascus Airport, Syria when the starboard undercarriage collapsed on landing.
- On 29 September 1956, EC-AKV of Aviaco crashed on approach to Los Rodeos Airport, Tenerife killing one person on the ground. The aircraft was operating a domestic scheduled passenger flight from Málaga Airport to Tenerife.
- On 4 December 1958, EC-ANR of Aviaco crashed into the La Rodilla de la Mujer Muerta mountain, in the Guadarrama Mountains, Spain, killing all 21 people on board. The aircraft was operating a domestic scheduled passenger flight from Vigo Airport to Barajas Airport, Madrid.

== Variants ==
Bloch 161-01
Prototype powered by 2 × 900 hp (670 kW) Gnome-Rhône 14N-38 & 2 × 900 hp Gnome-Rhône 14N-39, first flown on 15 December 1939.
SE.161/1
Production aircraft with 2 × 1,150 hp (860 kW) Gnome-Rhône 14N-44 & 2 × 1,150 hp (860 kW) Gnome-Rhône 14N-45 radial engines, LOT aircraft were fitted with 14N-54 / 14N-55 engines and later re-engined with 14N-68 / 14N-69 engines. Aeronavale aircraft were also fitted with 14N-68 / 14N-69s.
SE.161/P7
Re-engined Air France aircraft with four 1,220 hp (910 kW) Pratt & Whitney R-1830 SIC-3-G engines.

== Operators ==
Egypt

- Misrair

France

- Vichy French Government
- Air France
- Compagnie Air Transport
- French Air Force
  - EARS 99
  - GT I/61 "Maine"
- French Navy
  - Escadron 31S
  - Escadron 10S
  - Escadron 54S
  - Escadron 56S

Lebanon

- Air Liban

Morocco

- Air Atlas

Poland

- LOT Polish Airlines bought five aircraft in 1947 (reg. SP-LDA to LDE). Due to engine failures, the fleet was suspended in 1948 and broken up in 1950.

Spain

- Aviaco

Tunisia

- Tunis Air

== Specifications (SE.161/1) ==
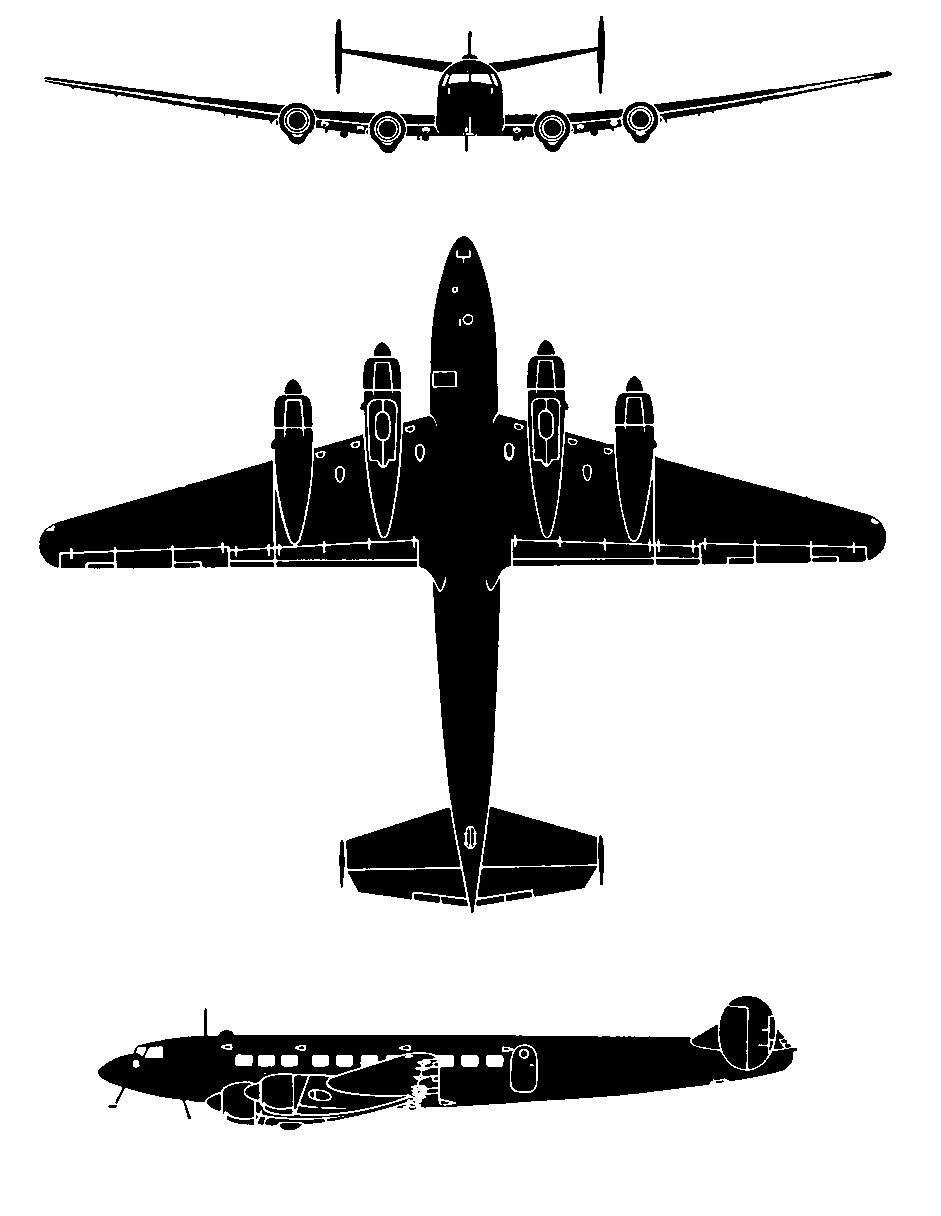
S.E.161 Languedoc

Data from French Postwar Transport Aircraft

General characteristics

- Crew: 5
- Capacity: 33
- Length: 24.26 m (79 ft 7 in)
- Wingspan: 29.39 m (96 ft 5 in)
- Height: 5.14 m (16 ft 10 in)
- Wing area: 111.32 m^{2} (1,198.2 sq ft)
- Empty weight: 12,651 kg (27,891 lb)
- Gross weight: 20,577 kg (45,365 lb)
- Fuel capacity: 8,420 L (2,220 US gal; 1,850 imp gal) in 4 pairs of wing tanks and 1 reserve tank in fuselage
- Powerplant: 4 × Gnome-Rhône 14N 44/45 radial engines , 858 kW (1,150 hp) each
- Propellers: 3-bladed Ratier variable-pitch propellers, 3.30 m (10 ft 10 in) diameter

Performance

- Maximum speed: 440 km/h (270 mph, 240 kn)
- Range: 3,200 km (2,000 mi, 1,700 nmi)
- Service ceiling: 7,200 m (23,600 ft)
- Rate of climb: 3 m/s (590 ft/min)

== See also ==
Related development

- Bloch MB.160
- Bloch MB.162

Aircraft of comparable role, configuration, and era

- Avro Lancastrian
- Douglas DC-4
- Focke-Wulf Fw 200

== Bibliography ==
- Bridgman, Leonard. Jane's All The World's Aircraft 1948. London: Sampson Low, Marston & Company, Ltd, 1948.
- Chillon, Jacques; Dubois, Jean-Pierre & Wegg, John (1980). French Post-War Transport Aircraft. Tonbridge, UK: Air-Britain. ISBN 0-85130-078-2.
- Cuny, Jean (1989). Les avions de combat français, 2: Chasse lourde, bombardement, assaut, exploration [French Combat Aircraft 2: Heavy Fighters, Bombers, Attack, Reconnaissance]. Docavia (in French). Vol. 30. Ed. Larivière. OCLC 36836833.
- Munson, Kenneth. Civil Airliners since 1946. London: Blandford Press, 1967.
- The Illustrated Encyclopedia of Aircraft (Part Work 1982-1985). London: Orbis Publishing, 1985.
- Ricco, Philippe (March 1999). "Le Bloch MB-161 «Bordeaux» ou...l'enfance cachée d'un avion célèbre". Le Fana de l'Aviation (in French). No. 352. pp. 30–46.
- Stroud, John. European Transport Aircraft since 1910. London: Putnam, 1966.
- Taylor, Michael J. H. Jane's Encyclopedia of Aviation. p. 844 London: Studio Editions, 1989. ISBN 978-0-517-69186-1.
