= List of aircraft (Sn) =

This is a list of aircraft in alphabetical order beginning with 'Sn'.

== Sn ==
=== SNC ===
- SNC Dream Chaser
- SNC TRJ-328
- SNC TRJ-628

=== SNCAC ===
(Société Nationale de Constructions Aéronautiques du Centre, France)

- SNCAC NC.130
- SNCAC NC.150
- SNCAC NC 211
- SNCAC NC.223
- SNCAC NC.232
- SNCAC NC.270
- SNCAC NC.271
- SNCAC NC.410
- SNCAC NC.420
- SNCAC NC.433
- SNCAC NC.470
- SNCAC NC.471
- SNCAC NC.472
- SNCAC NC.510
- SNCAC NC.530
- SNCAC NC.600
- SNCAC NC.700 Martinet
- SNCAC NC.701 Martinet
- SNCAC NC.702 Martinet
- SNCAC NC.800
- SNCAC NC.810
- SNCAC NC.820
- SNCAC NC.830
- SNCAC NC.832 Chardonneret
- SNCAC NC.840 Chardonneret
- SNCAC NC.841 Chardonneret
- SNCAC NC.850
- SNCAC NC.851
- SNCAC NC.853
- SNCAC NC.854
- SNCAC NC.855
- SNCAC NC.856
- SNCAC NC.858
- SNCAC NC.859
- SNCAC NC.860
- SNCAC NC.900
- SNCAC NC.1070
- SNCAC NC.1071
- SNCAC NC.1080
- SNCAC NC.2001 Abeille (Intermeshing rotors)
- SNCAC NC.3021 Belphégor

=== SNCAM ===
(Société Nationale de Constructions Aéronautiques du Midi) see Dewoitine

=== SNCAN ===
(Société Nationale de Constructions Aéronautiques du Nord)

- Nord N 262
- Nord N 500
- Nord 1000 Pingouin
- Nord 1001 Pingouin I
- Nord 1002 Pingouin II
- Nord 1100 Me208 / Noralpha prototypes
- Nord 1101 Noralpha
- Nord 1101 Ramier I
- Nord 1102 Noralpha
- Nord 1101 Ramier II
- Nord 1104 Noralpha
- S.F.E.R.M.A.-Nord 1110 Nord-Astazou
- Nord 1200 Norécrin
- Nord 1201 Norécrin I
- Nord 1202 Norécrin
- Nord 1203 Norécrin
- Nord 1204 Norécrin
- Nord 1221 Norélan
- Nord 1222 Norélan
- Nord 1223 Norélan
- Nord 1226 Norélan
- Nord 1400 Noroit
- Nord 1401 Noroit
- Nord 1402 Noroit
- Nord 1402 Gerfaut
- Nord 1405 Gerfaut II
- Nord 1500 Griffon II
- Nord 1500 Noréclair
- Nord 1601
- Nord 1700 Norélic
- Nord 1710
- Nord 1750 Norelfe
- Nord 2000
- Nord 2100 Norazur
- Nord 2101
- Nord 2102
- Nord 2200
- Nord 2500
- Nord 2501 Noratlas
- Nord 2501 Gabriel
- Nord 2502
- Nord 2503
- Nord 2504
- Nord 2505
- Nord 2506
- Nord 2507
- Nord 2508
- Nord 2509
- Nord 2510
- Nord 2520
- Nord 2800
- Nord 3200
- Nord 3201
- Nord 3202
- Nord 3400 Norbarbe
- Nord NC.850
- Nord NC.851
- Nord NC.852
- Nord NC.853
- Nord NC.854
- Nord NC.855
- Nord NC.856
- Nord NC.858
- Nord NC.859

=== SNCAO ===
(Société Nationale de Constructions Aéronautiques de l'Ouest)

- SNCAO CAO-30
- SNCAO CAO-200
- SNCAO CAO-400
- SNCAO CAO-600
- SNCAO CAO-700

=== SNCASE ===
(Société Nationale de Constructions Aéronautiques du Sud Est)

- SNCASE SE.100 (LeO 50)
- SNCASE SE.101
- SNCASE SE.102
- SNCASE SE-116 Voltigeur
- SNCASE SE.161 Languedoc (Bloch MB.161)
- SNCASE SE.200 Amphitrite
- SNCASE SE-210 Caravelle
- SNCASE SE.212 Durandal
- SNCASE SE-316
- SNCASE SE-400
- SNCASE SE.500
- SNCASE SE-520
- SNCASE SE-532 Mistral
- SNCASE SE-535 Mistral
- SNCASE SE.580
- SNCASE SE-582 fighter derived from the Dewoitine D.520
- SNCASE SE-600 reconnaissance aircraft project
- SNCASE SE-700
- SNCASE SE-700A
- SNCASE SE-700B
- SNCASE SE-701
- SNCASE SE-702
- SNCASE SE.800
- SNCASE SE-1000
- SNCASE SE-1010
- SNCASE SE-1030
- SNCASE SE-1200 large, long-range transatlantic passenger flying boat
- SNCASE SE-1210 scale model of the SE-1200
- SNCASE SE-1800 flying model for SST
- SNCASE SE-2000 Armagnac prototype for SE-2010
- SNCASE SE-2010 Armagnac
- SNCASE SE-2100
- SNCASE SE-2300
- SNCASE SE-2310
- SNCASE SE-2311
- SNCASE SE-2400
- SNCASE SE-2410 Grognard I
- SNCASE SE-2415 Grognard II
- SNCASE SE-2418 Grognard
- SNCASE SE-2421 Grognard
- SNCASE SE-3000
- SNCASE SE-3100
- SNCASE SE-3101
- SNCASE SE-3110
- SNCASE SE-3120 Alouette
- SNCASE SE-3130 Alouette II
- SNCASE SE-3131 Gouverneur
- SNCASE SE-3140
- SNCASE SE-3150 Llama
- SNCASE SE-3160 Alouette III
- SNCASE SE-3200 Frelon
- SNCASE SE-3210 Super Frelon
- SNCASE SE-5000 Baroudeur
- SNCASE SE-5003 Baroudeur
- SNCASE Aquilon
- SNCASE Vampire Mk 53
- SNCASE SE-S.55

=== SNCASO ===
(Société Nationale de Constructions Aéronautiques du Sud Ouest)

- SNCASO SO.30 Bretagne
- SNCASO SO.30 Bellatrix
- SNCASO SO.80 Biarritz
- SNCASO SO.90 Cassiopée
- SNCASO SO.93 Corse
- SNCASO SO.94 Corse II
- SNCASO SO.95M Corse III
- SNCASO SO.175
- SNCASO SO.177
- SNCASO SO.1100 Ariel I
- SNCASO SO.1110 Ariel II
- SNCASO SO.1120 Ariel III
- SNCASO SO.1221 Djinn
- SNCASO SO.1310 Farfadet
- SNCASO SO.3050
- SNCASO SO.M1
- SNCASO SO.M2
- SNCASO SO P.1
- SNCASO SO.4000
- SNCASO SO.4050 Vautour II
- SNCASO SO.6000 Triton
- SNCASO SO.6020 Espadon
- SNCASO SO.6021 Espadon
- SNCASO SO.6025 Espadon
- SNCASO SO.6026 Espadon
- SNCASO SO.7010 Pégase
- SNCASO SO.7050
- SNCASO SO.7055 Deauville
- SNCASO SO.7060 Deauville
- SNCASO SO.8000 Narval
- SNCASO SO.9000 Trident I
- SNCASO SO.9050 Trident II
- SNCASO SO.9050 Trident III

=== SNECMA ===
(Société Nationale d'Etudes et de Construction de Moteurs d'Avions)

- SNECMA Coléoptère
- SNECMA ATAR Volant

=== SOSA ===
(Société Oyonnaxienne des Sports Aériens)

- Léglise L.500 Jumbo

=== Snell ===
(Harry B Snell, Toledo, OH)

- Snell 1910 helicogyre

=== SnoBird ===
(SnoBird Aircraft Company)

- SnoBird Explorer

=== Snoke ===
(R Snoke)

- Snoke Swifty Jr

=== Snow Aeronautical ===
( (Leland) Snow Aeronautical Co, Olney, TX)

- Snow S-1
- Snow S-2

=== Snyder ===
(Motor Gliders Inc, Johnson Airport (fdr: Orville H "Bud" Snyder) a.k.a. Aire Kraft Inc, Dayton, OH)

- Snyder Baby Bomber
- Snyder Buzzard Light Plane a.k.a. MG-1
- Snyder OHS-III

=== Snyder ===
(Charles Snyder, Lockport, IL)

- Snyder FS-1

=== Snyder ===
(Dr. Cloyd L. Snyder)

- Snyder Glider
- Snyder Dirigiplane
- Snyder A-2

=== Snyder-Macready ===
(Orville H. Snyder & Lt John A. Macready, Dayton, OH)

- Snyder-Macready Baby Bomber
