= Snoke (disambiguation) =

Supreme Leader Snoke is a character in the Star Wars franchise.

Snoke may also refer to:

- David Snoke, a physics professor at the University of Pittsburgh
- Snoke Swifty Jr, a midget racer airplane manufactured by R Snoke in 1959
