= Dewoitine HD.730 =

HD.730

General information
- Type: Reconnaissance floatplane
- National origin: France
- Manufacturer: Dewoitine/SNCAM
- Status: Prototype
- Number built: 3

History
- First flight: February 1940

The Dewoitine HD.730 was a prototype French reconnaissance floatplane of the 1940s. It was a single-engined, low-wing monoplane that was designed as a catapult-launched reconnaissance aircraft to operate from warships of the French Navy. Two flew in 1940, and a third aircraft was built to a modified design in 1941, but no production followed.

== Development and design ==
The Dewoitine HD.730 was designed by Emile Dewoitine's team at the Société nationale des constructions aéronautiques du Midi (SNCAM), which was formed in 1937 when Dewoitine's Société Aéronautique Française was nationalised, in order to meet a French Navy requirement for a light catapult-launched observation aircraft, with two prototypes ordered in 1938. It was a low-wing monoplane of all-metal stressed-skin construction. It was fitted with an inverted gull-wing, which folded immediately outboard of the twin floats to aid storage on board ship, and it had twin tail fins. The two-man crew of pilot and observer sat in tandem under an enclosed canopy. The observer was armed with a single flexibly mounted machine gun, and a fixed machine gun was operated by the pilot. It was powered by a single 164 kW (220 hp) Renault 6Q inverted six-cylinder air-cooled piston engine driving a two-blade propeller.

The first prototype flew in February 1940, with the second following in May. Testing showed that it was underpowered, and it was proposed that the planned 40 production aircraft would be use a 261 kW (350 hp) Béarn 6D. These plans were stopped by the French surrender in June 1940, with the two prototypes being stored.

Despite the Armistice, development continued, with a significantly revised third prototype being built by the Société nationale des constructions aéronautiques du Sud-Est (SNCASE) at Marignane, the HD.731.01. This was powered by a Béarn 6D and was smaller than the HD.730, with a wingspan of 10.21 m (33 ft 6 in) compared with 12.60 m (41 ft 4 in) for the HD.730. In order to avoid Axis controls on the production of military aircraft, it was officially described as a commercial liaison aircraft for use in France's overseas colonies, but despite this, it was still fitted with folding wings. It made its maiden flight on 11 March 1941, but testing revealed that its wings were too small and the HD.731 was abandoned. SNCASE meanwhile resumed work on the HD.730, refitting the second prototype with a Béarn 6D, testing starting again in July 1941 and continuing until being prohibited by the Italian Control commission in December.

Work on the HD.730 restarted again after the German retreat from the south of France, with the second prototype being fitted with a single fin and rudder, flying again on 21 July 1945. While testing was successful, the French Navy now had no need for a catapult floatplane, as catapults had been removed from its ships, and although consideration was given to using the type as a trainer, the SCAN 20 was selected instead and the HD-730 was abandoned.

== Specifications (HD.730-01, original form) ==
Data from War Planes of the Second World War: Volume Six Floatplanes

General characteristics

- Crew: 2
- Length: 9.06 m (29 ft 9 in)
- Wingspan: 10.28 m (33 ft 9 in)
- Height: 3.18 m (10 ft 5 in)
- Wing area: 20.00 m^{2} (215.3 sq ft)
- Empty weight: 1,173 kg (2,586 lb)
- Gross weight: 1,870 kg (4,123 lb)
- Powerplant: 1 × Renault 6Q-03 inverted air-cooled six-cylinder, 160 kW (220 hp)

Performance

- Maximum speed: 230 km/h (143 mph, 124 kn) at 2,000 (6,560 ft)
- Cruise speed: 230 km/h (140 mph, 120 kn) at 1,500 m (4,920 ft)
- Range: 1,350 km (840 mi, 730 nmi)
- Service ceiling: 5,100 m (16,800 ft)
- Time to altitude: 14 min 37 sec to 4,200 m (13,800 ft)

Armament

- Guns: 1× fixed forward firing 7.5mm Darne gun and one flexibly mounted Darne gun in rear cockpit
- Bombs: 8× 10 kg (22 lb) bombs

== See also ==
Related lists

- List of flying boats and floatplanes
