= SNCAC NC.860 =

NC.860

General information
- Type: Civil utility aircraft
- National origin: France
- Manufacturer: SNCAC
- Number built: 1

History
- First flight: 28 March 1949
- Developed from: NC.853

The SNCAC NC.860 (also known as the Aérocentre NC.860) was a French twin-engined development of the NC.853 light aircraft.

== Development ==
The NC.860 was developed from the earlier NC.853 single-engined high-wing monoplane, major changes included a four-seat cabin and the fitting of two 105 hp (78 kW) Walter Minor 4-III engines on a re-designed wing. With the engines mounted on the high-wing the wing span was increased and the NC.860 had a tricycle landing gear.

The NC.860, registered F-WFKJ, first flew 28 March 1949.

== Specification ==
Data from

General characteristics

- Crew: 1
- Capacity: 3
- Length: 7.7 m (25 ft 3 in)
- Wingspan: 13.42 m (44 ft 0 in)
- Wing area: 20.0 m^{2} (215 sq ft)
- Empty weight: 760 kg (1,676 lb)
- Gross weight: 1,200 kg (2,646 lb)
- Powerplant: 2 × Walter Minor 4-III four-cylinder inverted inline air-cooled engine, 78 kW (105 hp) each

Performance

- Maximum speed: 240 km/h (150 mph, 130 kn)
- Cruise speed: 210 km/h (130 mph, 110 kn)
- Range: 1,000 km (620 mi, 540 nmi)
