= SNCAC NC.3021 Belphégor =

NC.3021 Belphégor

General information
- Type: Upper altitude research aircraft
- National origin: France
- Manufacturer: SNCAC
- Designer: Marcel Roca
- Number built: 1

History
- First flight: 6 June 1946
- Retired: 1947
- Developed from: SNCAC NC.3020 wartime project

The SNCAC NC.3021 Belphégor was a French high altitude research aircraft designed and built at the end of World War II. Only one was completed and it was not a success, in part because of problems with its unusual engine.

== Design and development ==
The Belphégor had its origins during World War II in Marcel Roca's SNCAC NC.3020 design, an ultimately unbuilt aircraft powered by a coupled pair of Hispano-Suiza HS.12Z engines mounted side by side in the nose driving coaxial propellers. When work on the design resumed at the war's end these engines were replaced with a similarly arranged Daimler-Benz pair, resulting in a revised type, the NC.3021. The Belphégor was intended to provide a high altitude laboratory for studies of the meteorology of the upper atmosphere, high altitude aerodynamics and also of incoming cosmic rays. The measurements were to be made at altitudes between 10,000 m (32,800 ft) and 14,000 m (45,900 ft). The pressurization system was fed from a large scoop intake below the engine into engine driven compressors. The pressurized cabin, slightly wider than high had an average diameter of about 2.45 m (8 ft 0 in) allowing the two observers comfortable working room and a total cabin volume of 11 m^{3} (390 cu ft). They had observation windows in the cabin roof and in its floor. The crew positions were also in the pressurized region: the pilot's cockpit placed his head above the upper fuselage under a clear canopy. Two other crew, navigator and radio operator sat wholly within the cabin.

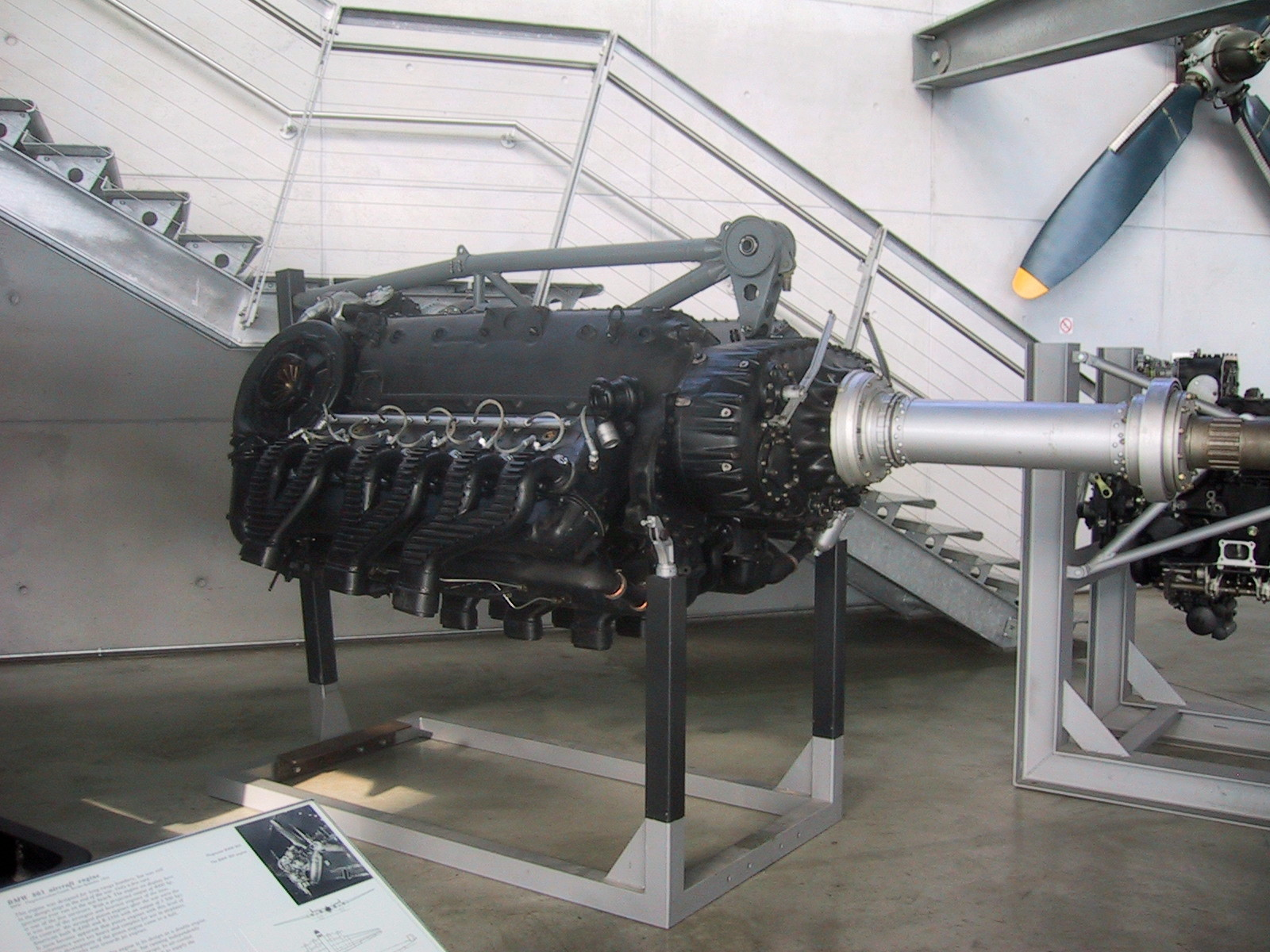
Museum-preserved DB 610 "power system" twin-crankcase "coupled engine", similar to the Belphegor's powerplant.

The Belphégor was a cantilever mid-wing monoplane. The three part, high aspect ratio wing was strongly tapered in plan, mid-positioned and built around a single steel main spar with two auxiliary spars which were wooden in the outer sections. The broad chord wing roots were carefully faired into a near circular fuselage. The ailerons, fitted with tabs, were metal framed but fabric covered. Two part, hydraulically operated camber changing metal slotted flaps were fitted. Its semi-monocoque fuselage was in three sections; the metal forward part contained the German-designed 2,200 kW (2,950 hp) Daimler-Benz DB 610A twin-crankcased "power system" engine unit weighing some 1.5 tonnes by itself, with its circular radiator in the nose and driving a single four blade propeller as well as the pressurization system. Behind it a tubular Dural structure supported the double skinned cabin and a final, wooden tail section. The tail unit was conventional, with a single tall straight edged, round topped fin and rudder. All the flight controls, whether on the wings or the tail, were both dynamically and aerodynamically balanced. The tail wheel undercarriage had inward retracting main legs.

Its first flight was on 6 June 1946 from Toussus-le-Noble Airport. Flight tests were made difficult, if not dangerous, by the DB 610's tendency to overheat and they were abandoned either in 1947 in the absence of financial support or in 1949, after only forty flying hours, because of the continuing mechanical problems.

== Specifications ==
Data from Flight 12 June 1947, p.534

General characteristics

- Crew: Three
- Capacity: Two observers
- Length: 17.50 m (57 ft 5 in)
- Wingspan: 23.55 m (77 ft 3 in)
- Height: 5.82 m (19 ft 1 in)
- Wing area: 49.8 m^{2} (536 sq ft)
- Aspect ratio: 10
- Empty weight: 7,500 kg (16,535 lb)
- Max takeoff weight: 10,000 kg (22,046 lb)
- Powerplant: 1 × Daimler-Benz DB 610A side by side pair of DB 605 V-12 inverted, water-cooled engines geared together onto a single propeller shaft, 2,200 kW (2,950 hp) at sea level
- Propellers: 4-bladed, 4.5 m (14 ft 9 in) diameter

Performance

- Maximum speed: 560 km/h (348 mph, 302 kn) at 9,800 m (32,000 ft)
- Cruise speed: 449 km/h (279 mph, 242 kn) at 12,000 m (39,300 ft)
- Endurance: 4 hr
- Service ceiling: 13,000 m (42,000 ft)
- Landing speed: 140 km/h (87 mph)
