= SNCASE SE-700 =

SE-700

General information
- Type: Three seat passenger autogyro
- National origin: France
- Manufacturer: SNCASE
- Number built: 2

History
- First flight: 25 May 1945

The SNCASE SE-700 was a three-seat passenger autogyro designed during World War II. Two were completed but only the first flew and the programme was soon abandoned.

== Design and development ==
Design of the SE-700 began in 1939 but World War II delayed its completion and first flight until 25 May 1945. Compared with most autogyros of its time it had a very advanced appearance, with a sleek, streamlined fuselage, an enclosed central engine and a three blade rotor on a straight edged, aerofoil section pylon. The enclosed cabin, which seated three, was ahead of the engine and behind a nose which tapered smoothly into the spinner of the two blade propeller.

At the rear of the short fuselage was a low aspect ratio tailplane, externally braced to the fuselage underside and fitted with elevators. It carried swept, oval tail fins taken from the SNCASE SE-100 twin engine fighter at its tips, which were externally braced to the tailplane underside. The fins were fitted with rudders and, more unusually, wheels; the SE.100 had fin mounted tail wheels but the SE.700 had tricycle gear so these became the main wheels, tidily faired into the bottom of the fins. Its nosewheel retracted backwards, placing the wheel partly in the fuselage and its leg within a small ventral fairing.

The first prototype, piloted by Stakenburg, flew with a 164 kW (220 hp) Renault 6Q-01 six cylinder, inverted air-cooled inline engine. It proved difficult to control and crashed after a few test flights. Though the damage was not great, the SE-700 was not repaired and SNCASE decided instead to complete a more refined second prototype, the SE-701 or SE-700A. This was fitted with a more powerful 246 kW (330 hp) Béarn 6D-07 engine, another six cylinder, inverted air-cooled inline. However, the company then decided that the post-war market for small commuter autogyros was too limited to proceed, so the SE-700A did not fly and a proposed production series of four SE-702s or 700Bs were not begun.

== Specifications (SE-700A) ==
Data from Gaillard (1990), p.33, Jane's all the World's Aircraft 1947 Performance data estimated.

General characteristics

- Crew: One
- Capacity: Two passengers
- Length: 6.55 m (21 ft 6 in)
- Width: 4.60 m (15 ft 1 in) tailplane span plus thickness of wheel fairings
- Height: 3.80 m (12 ft 6 in)
- Empty weight: 1,400 kg (3,086 lb)
- Max takeoff weight: 2,000 kg (4,409 lb)
- Powerplant: 1 × Béarn 6D-07 6 cylinder, air-cooled, inverted, in-line, 250 kW (330 hp)
- Main rotor diameter: One × 13.3 m (43 ft 8 in)
- Main rotor area: 123 m^{2} (1,320 sq ft) three bladed main rotor
- Propellers: 2-bladed Ratier electrically operated constant-speed airscrew

Performance

- Maximum speed: 265 km/h (165 mph, 143 kn) at 2,000 m (6,562 ft)
- Cruise speed: 220 km/h (140 mph, 120 kn) *Minimum forward speed: 45 km/h (28 mph; 24 kn) at sea level
- Range: 660 km (410 mi, 360 nmi)
- Endurance: 3 hours
- Service ceiling: 4,500 m (14,800 ft)
- Disk loading: 16.26 kg/m^{2} (3.33 lb/sq ft) at maximum weight
