= SNCAC NC.1070 =

Ground attack and torpedo bomber

NC.1070
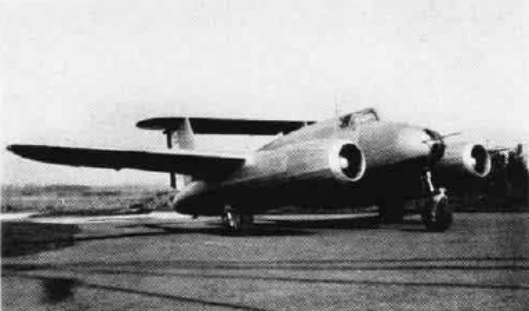
- The Rolls-Royce Nene powered NC.1071

General information
- Type: Ground attack and torpedo bomber
- National origin: France
- Manufacturer: SNCAC
- Number built: 2 (NC.1070 and NC.1071)

History
- First flight: 25 May 1947
- Developed into: SNCAC NC.1071

The SNCAC NC.1070 was a piston engined attack and torpedo bomber designed and built in France shortly after World War II. The second prototype, the NC.1071, was the first French multi-jet turbine powered aircraft.

== Design and development ==
Built shortly after World War II, the NC.1070 was a contemporary of the Nord 1500 Noréclair and was intended to take a similar role. It was a twin engine aircraft of unconventional layout with twin booms, twin fins and a double horizontal tail. The central fuselage was not a pod, though short compared with the wing span, and extended beyond the tail.

The NC.1070 was powered by a pair of SNECMA 14R fourteen-cylinder, two-row, air-cooled radial engines mounted well ahead of the wing. The fairings behind them extended around the wings and beyond as booms; at their rear, rectangular fixed tailplanes linked the booms to the fuselage. A straight tapered fin and rudder with trim tabs was mounted at the end of each boom with a constant chord, round tipped main tailplane mounted on top of them, carrying a one-piece elevator.

The wings were mid-mounted and strongly tapered with slightly swept leading edges and marked curvature on the trailing edges. They were fitted with tabbed ailerons and flaps. There were three crew, a bomb aimer/observer housed in a partially glazed nose, the pilot in a conventional cockpit which merged into a raised rear fuselage and, in the extreme tail just beyond the fins, a rear gunner in a turret. The NC.1070 had retractable tricycle gear, the nose leg slightly offset to port and each leg with a large single wheel.

The NC.1070 was first flown on 23 May 1947. Tests continued into 1948 but, piloted by Fernand Lasne, it was seriously damaged in a belly landing at Toussus-le-Noble Airport on 9 March 1948 and did not fly again. Instead, SNCAC concentrated on the jet powered second prototype, the NC.1071.

This was powered by a pair of 22.24 kN (5,000 lbf) Rolls-Royce Nenes, mounted in booms like the piston engines of the NC.1070, though rather further forward, positioned below the wing and with their tailpipes emerging from the previously pointed boom ends. Because of the lowered booms/tailpipes the lower, fixed horizontal tail was removed. The rear gun position was replaced by a partially glazed observer's position and the bottom of the rudder was clipped to avoid the jet exhaust. Apart from these engine induced changes the NC.1071 was aerodynamically very similar to the NC.1070, with the same dimensions and only 130 kg (287 lb) heavier empty. Its maximum speed was increased by nearly 40% at altitude and it had a greater ceiling, (13,000 m (43,000 ft)) but its range, much reduced, was only 1,000 km (620 mi)

The NC.1071 made its first flight on 12 October 1948. It suffered damage to its undercarriage on 27 April 1949, flew again in 1950 and was modified the following May after significant structural distortion appeared in flight. Though both an all weather fighter variant (NC.1072) and an attack bomber (NC.1073) were considered, they were not built and development was abandoned at the end of NC.1071's flight tests.

== Variants ==
NC.1070
The piston-engined first prototype. Abandoned after landing accident on 9 March 1948.
NC.1071
Rolls-Royce Nene-powered second prototype, first flown 12 October 1948. The first French multi-jet aircraft.

== Specifications (NC.1070) ==
Data from Les Avions Francais de 1944 à 1964

General characteristics

- Crew: Three
- Length: 10.20 m (33 ft 6 in)
- Wingspan: 20 m (65 ft 7 in)
- Height: 4.60 m (15 ft 1 in)
- Wing area: 50 m^{2} (540 sq ft)
- Empty weight: 7,850 kg (17,306 lb)
- Max takeoff weight: 10,700 kg (23,589 lb)
- Powerplant: 2 × SNECMA 14R 14 cylinder two-row air-cooled radial engine, 1,200 kW (1,600 hp) each

Performance

- Maximum speed: 578 km/h (359 mph, 312 kn)
- Range: 3,400 km (2,100 mi, 1,800 nmi)
- Service ceiling: 9,950 m (32,640 ft)

Armament

- Guns: 4 in rear turret
- Bombs: Torpedo

== Bibliography ==
- Buttler, Tony. X-Planes of Europe II: Military Prototype Aircraft from the Golden Age 1946–1974. Manchester, UK: Hikoki Publications, 2015. ISBN 978-1-90210-948-0
- Carbonel, Jean-Christophe (2016). French Secret Projects. Vol. 1: Post War Fighters. Crecy Publishing. ISBN 978-1-91080-900-6.
- Cuny, Jean (1989). Les avions de combat français, 2: Chasse lourde, bombardement, assaut, exploration [French Combat Aircraft 2: Heavy Fighters, Bombers, Attack, Reconnaissance]. Docavia (in French). Vol. 30. Ed. Larivière. OCLC 36836833.
- Gaillard, Pierre (1990). Les Avions Francais de 1944 à 1964. Paris: Éditions EPA. ISBN 2-85120-350-9.
- Green, William; Cross, Roy (1955). The Jet Aircraft of the World. London: McDonald. p. 88.
- Marchand, Alain (May 1977). "Les N.C.1070 et 1071 (2)". Le Fana de l'Aviation (in French) (90): 34–37. ISSN 0757-4169.
- Marchand, Alain (June 1977). "Les N.C.1070 et 1071 (3)". Le Fana de l'Aviation (in French) (91): 34–38. ISSN 0757-4169.
- Marchand, Alain (July 1977). "Les N.C.1070 et 1071 (4)". Le Fana de l'Aviation (in French) (92): 36–37. ISSN 0757-4169.
- Marchand, Alain (August 1977). "Les N.C.1070 et 1071 (5)". Le Fana de l'Aviation (in French) (93): 34–38. ISSN 0757-4169.
- Receveau, Roger (September 1977). "Le N.C.1071". Le Fana de l'Aviation (in French) (94): 28–29. ISSN 0757-4169.
