= Aviator Shershen' =

Shershen'

General information
- Type: Two seat sport biplane
- National origin: Russia
- Manufacturer: Aviator

History
- First flight: 2005
- Developed from: Aviator Retro

The Aviator Shershen' (Russian: Шершень; English: Hornet) is a Russian two seat biplane, sold in kit form. It first flew in 2005 and several variants have been produced, with a choice of engines.

== Design and development ==
The Shershen' is a development of the company's earlier Retro. It is a kit built tandem seat single bay biplane; the prototype, Shershen'-3 and -14 have V-form interplane struts, their forward members in broad chord fairings, but the Shershen'-2 has more slender, N-form struts. All have diagonal flying wire bracing and an upper wing 8° of quarter-chord sweep, with an unswept lower wing. The -2 is rigged with 3° of dihedral (aircraft) on the upper wing and 2.33° on the lower one. The upper wing is held well above the fuselage, above the forward open cockpit, by a pair of N-form cabane struts; the wing has a trailing edge cut-out to improve the upward vision from this cockpit. The prototype had flaperons on the lower wings only but later versions have separate flaps and ailerons on both planes, the latter externally rod connected.

The Shershen' has a fabric covered flat sided fuselage with a steel tube frame. Rounded decking is cut away locally for the two cockpits. Both have windscreens and the rear cockpit has a prominent headrest. The Shershen's tailplane is mounted at mid-fuselage height, with an angle of incidence that can be adjusted for trimming. Additionally, there is a port elevator trim tab. The rudder is broad and rounded, extending down to the keel on all models, though two styles of fin have been used. The prototype and the -14 variant have fins with a full rounded leading edge but those of the -2 and -3 are straight edged and vertical. A fixed, conventional undercarriage with a small tailwheel has mainwheels on faired V struts hinged on the lower fuselage. On all but the -3, half-axles with bungee cord shock absorbers run to a central compression frame. The -3 variant has instead oleo legs attached to the outside of the V struts and to the mid fuselage sides.

Two different engine types have been used. The prototype and the -2 variant have the 116 kW (156 hp) Subaru EJ25 flat-four, driving a three blade, ground adjustable pitch propeller, whereas the -3 has a 119 kW (160 hp) Walter Minor III inline, inverted four cylinder unit driving a wooden, fixed pitch, two blade propeller.

== Variants ==
Shershen'
Prototype. Subaru engine, 3 blade propeller, round fin, 7.07 m (23 ft 2 in) span, bungee undercarriage. Airfoil RII, thickness/chord ratio 12%. First flown 2005.
Shershen'-2
Subaru engine, 3 blade propeller, straight fin, bungee undercarriage. As specifications. Airfoil NACA 23012, thickness/chord 12%. First flown 2007.
Shershen'-3
Walter engine, 2 blade propeller, straight fin, oleo undercarriage. First flown 2008.
Shershen'-14
Subaru engine, round fin, bungee undercarriage. First flown 2009.

== Specifications (Shershen'-2) ==
Data from Jane's All the World's Aircraft 2013-14 pp.514-5

General characteristics

- Capacity: Two
- Length: 6.05 m (19 ft 10 in)
- Wingspan: 7.35 m (24 ft 1 in)
- Height: 2.63 m (8 ft 8 in)
- Wing area: 16.0 m^{2} (172 sq ft)
- Airfoil: R III 12
- Powerplant: 1 × Subaru EJ25 flat-four, 116 kW (156 hp)
- Propellers: 3-bladed

Performance

- Maximum speed: 185 km/h (115 mph, 100 kn)
- Cruise speed: 150 km/h (93 mph, 81 kn) normal
- Stall speed: 70 km/h (43 mph, 38 kn) clean
- Never exceed speed: 250 km/h (160 mph, 130 kn)
- Range: 450 km (280 mi, 240 nmi)
- Endurance: 3 h
- Service ceiling: 2,000 m (6,600 ft) service
- g limits: +8/-4
- Take-off run: 190 m (624 ft)
- Landing run: 200 m (657 ft)
