= Hispano-Suiza 24Y and 24Z =

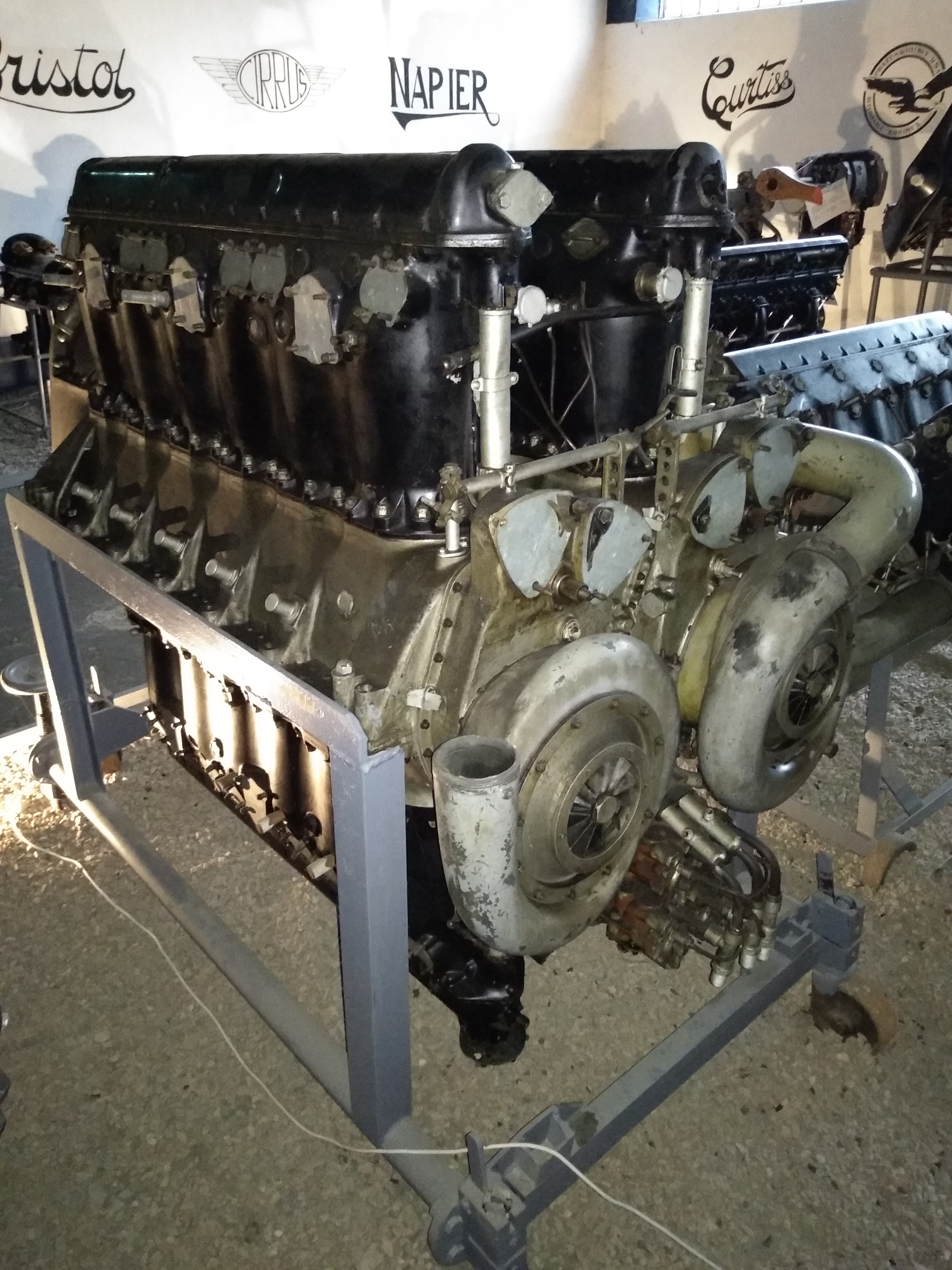
Surviving Type 82 prototype (Polish Aviation Museum)

Hispano-Suiza 24Y and 24Z are 24 cylinder engines with a H layout, developed before and during World War II by Hispano-Suiza in France.

== 24Y Type 82 ==
In 1936, the French Air Ministry issued a requirement for a new aircraft engine in the 2000 horsepower range, for a transatlantic flying boat project. At this point in time, Hispano-Suiza was already producing its 12Y, a 1000 hp V12 used mostly in fighters. Thus, the company decided to use the 12Y as a basis for a 24-cylinder design. However, unlike Allison with its V-3420 and Daimler-Benz with its DB 606 a bit later, Hispano-Suiza engineers didn't choose to assemble two V12's side-by-side on a common gearbox. Rather, while the cylinder banks were reused from the 12Y, and many parts remained interchangeable, the whole engine was rearranged into a compact H layout. The engine is composed of two vertical Flat-12's, each having its own crankshaft, connected on a common gearbox. Superchargers, cooling systems, pumps, and other systems were directly borrowed from the 12Y. A prototype was tested, but the development was suspended in favor of more pressing military need. The prototype was rediscovered in Poland after WWII. The circumstances in which it was transported to Poland are unclear.

== 24Y Type 90 ==
This version was developed in parallel with the Type 82. The difference was that it didn't join the power from both crankshafts into a single propeller. Rather, each crankshaft drove one of two contra-rotating propellers, making the two parts of the engines quite independent, without any mechanical connection. The prototype disappeared during WWII.

== 24Z Type 95 ==
Work on this engine started in 1943, in Tarbes, where Hispano-Suiza's design team had been relocated. This design was similar to the Type 90 (driving contra-rotating propellers), but was based on the 12Z, a more advanced version of the French V12 design featuring 4 valves per cylinder, rather than the 12Y. The engine was theoretically capable of 3600 hp. Its first intended application was the SNCASE SE.580 fighter. After WWII, attempts were made to market the engine for civilian use (it was displayed at the Paris Air Show in November 1946), but without success. A prototype is preserved in the Musée de l'air et de l'espace.

== See also ==
- Hispano-Suiza
- Hispano-Suiza 12Y, related engines
- Arsenal 24H, Daimler Benz DB 606, Allison V-3420 : engines with similar design philosophy (24 cylinders designs based on existing V12 engines)
