= Nord 2100 Norazur =

French light airliner with 2 piston engines, 1947

2100 Norazur

General information
- Type: Ten-passenger transport monoplane
- National origin: France
- Manufacturer: Nord Aviation
- Number built: 1

History
- First flight: 30 April 1947

The Nord 2100 Norazur was a 1940s French military transport monoplane designed and built at Courbevoie near Paris by SNCAN.

== Design and development ==
The Norazur was a high-wing cantilever monoplane with a retractable tricycle landing gear. Powered by two wing-mounted Potez piston engines in pusher configuration. It had an enclosed cabin for ten passengers or freight.

Designed to meet a post-war requirement for a light transport and training aircraft the Norazur first flew at Les Mureaux on 30 April 1947. An additional prototype with 290 kW (390 hp) Béarn 6D-07 engines is believed to have been built. With other similar designs available the type did not enter production.

== Variants ==
N2100
Prototype light transport with two 310 kW (420 hp) Potez 8D-03 inverted, air-cooled V-8 piston engines in pusher configuration, one built.
N2101
Prototype with alternate 290 kW (390 hp) Béarn 6D-07 inverted, air-cooled V-6 piston engines in pusher configuration, believed to have been built.
N2102
Projected variant with two SNECMA 12S engines in tractor configuration.

== Specifications ==
Data from

General characteristics

- Crew: 2
- Capacity: 10 passengers
- Length: 13.5 m (44 ft 3 in)
- Wingspan: 18.0 m (59 ft 1 in)
- Height: 3.85 m (12 ft 8 in)
- Wing area: 38 m^{2} (410 sq ft)
- Empty weight: 3,280 kg (7,231 lb)
- Gross weight: 4,630 kg (10,207 lb)
- Powerplant: 2 × Potez 8D-03 inverted V-8 piston engines in pusher configuration, 310 kW (420 hp) each

Performance

- Maximum speed: 340 km/h (210 mph, 180 kn) at 1500m
- Cruise speed: 312 km/h (194 mph, 168 kn) at 3000m
- Range: 1,100 km (680 mi, 590 nmi)
- Service ceiling: 6,500 m (21,300 ft)

== Bibliography ==
- Bridgman, Leonard (1950). Jane's All the World's Aircraft 1950-51. London: Sampson, Low, Marston and Co. Ltd. p. 150c.
- Chillon, Jacques; Dubois, Jean-Pierre & Wegg, John (1980). French Post-War Transport Aircraft. Tonbridge, UK: Air-Britain. ISBN 0-85130-078-2.
- Photo of N-2100
