= Walter Minor =

1920s Czech piston aircraft engine

Minor
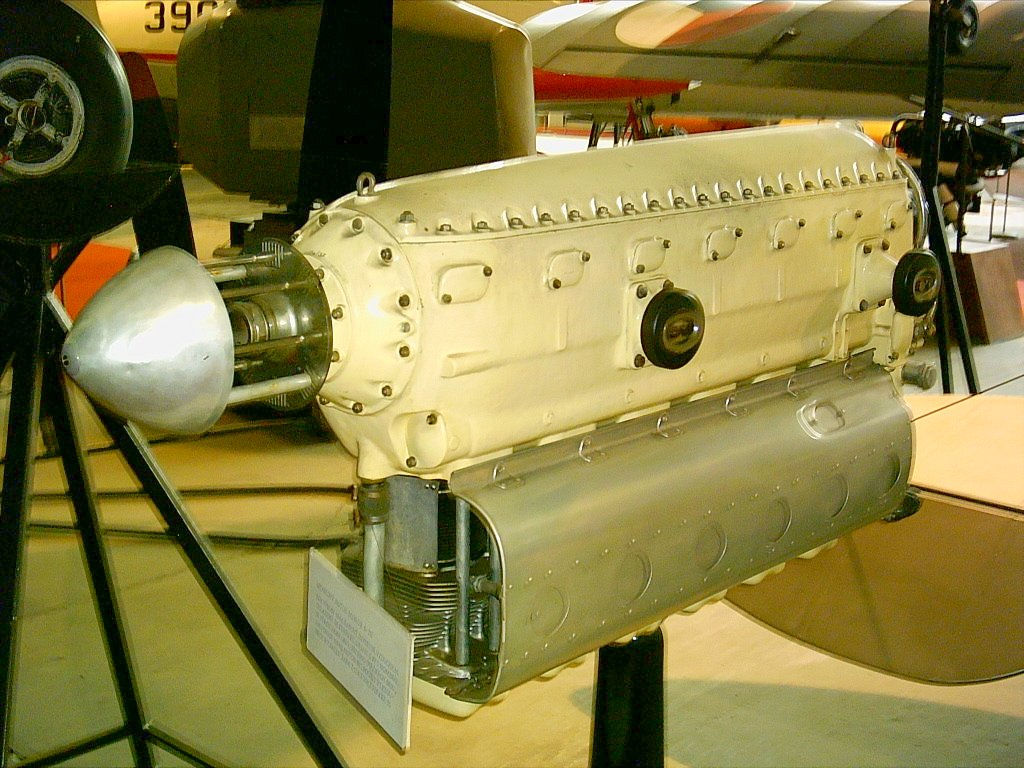
- Preserved Walter Minor 6-III
- Type: Inline piston engine
- National origin: Czechoslovakia
- Manufacturer: Walter Aircraft Engines
- First run: 1929

The Walter Minor is a family of four- and six-cylinder inverted inline air-cooled engines, developed under auspices of ing. Šimůnek and used on light aircraft. First produced in 1929, the Minor engines' family has an advanced design for the period and sports steel cylinders, aluminum heads and overhead valves, with identical bore and stroke of 105 mm (4.1 in) and 115 mm (4.5 in), respectively. Typical power ratings varied from 105 to 160 hp (78 to 119 kW).

After Walter concentrated on the turbine powerplants only, the production of piston engines has been transferred to the Avia company that further developed the family, bringing fuel injection, as the Avia M-137 and M-337. Nowadays the smallest of the family, the four-cylinder carburetted Minor, is produced by a small company in the Czech Republic, while the M337 was available from the LOM Prague.

== Variants ==
=== 4 Cylinder ===
Minor 4-I
Minor 4-II
Minor 4-III
Minor 4-IIIS
A 4-III fitted with a crankshaft driven supercharger.
Minor M 332 (4 cyl.)

=== 6 Cylinder ===
Minor 6-I
Minor 6-II
Minor 6-III
Minor 6-IIIS
A 6-III fitted with a crankshaft driven supercharger.
Minor M 337 (6 cyl.)

=== Others ===
Minor Sc.

== Applications ==
- Aero Ae 45
- Aero Ae 50
- Aviator Shershen'
- Beneš-Mráz Beta-Minor
- Fry Esprit VFII
- IAR 814
- Ikarus Aero 2
- Ikarus Kurir
- LAZ-7
- Let L-200 Morava
- LIBIS KB-6
- LWD Zuch
- Manzolini Libellula II
- Nord NC.856
- Nord NC.859
- Nord NC-860
- OFW OK-15
- Orličan L-40 Meta Sokol
- Pasotti Airone
- Praga E-210
- Praga E-211
- RG-7 Șoim
- RG-7 Șoim III
- Starck AS-57
- Zlin 22
- Zlin Trener

== Specifications (Minor 4-cylinder) ==
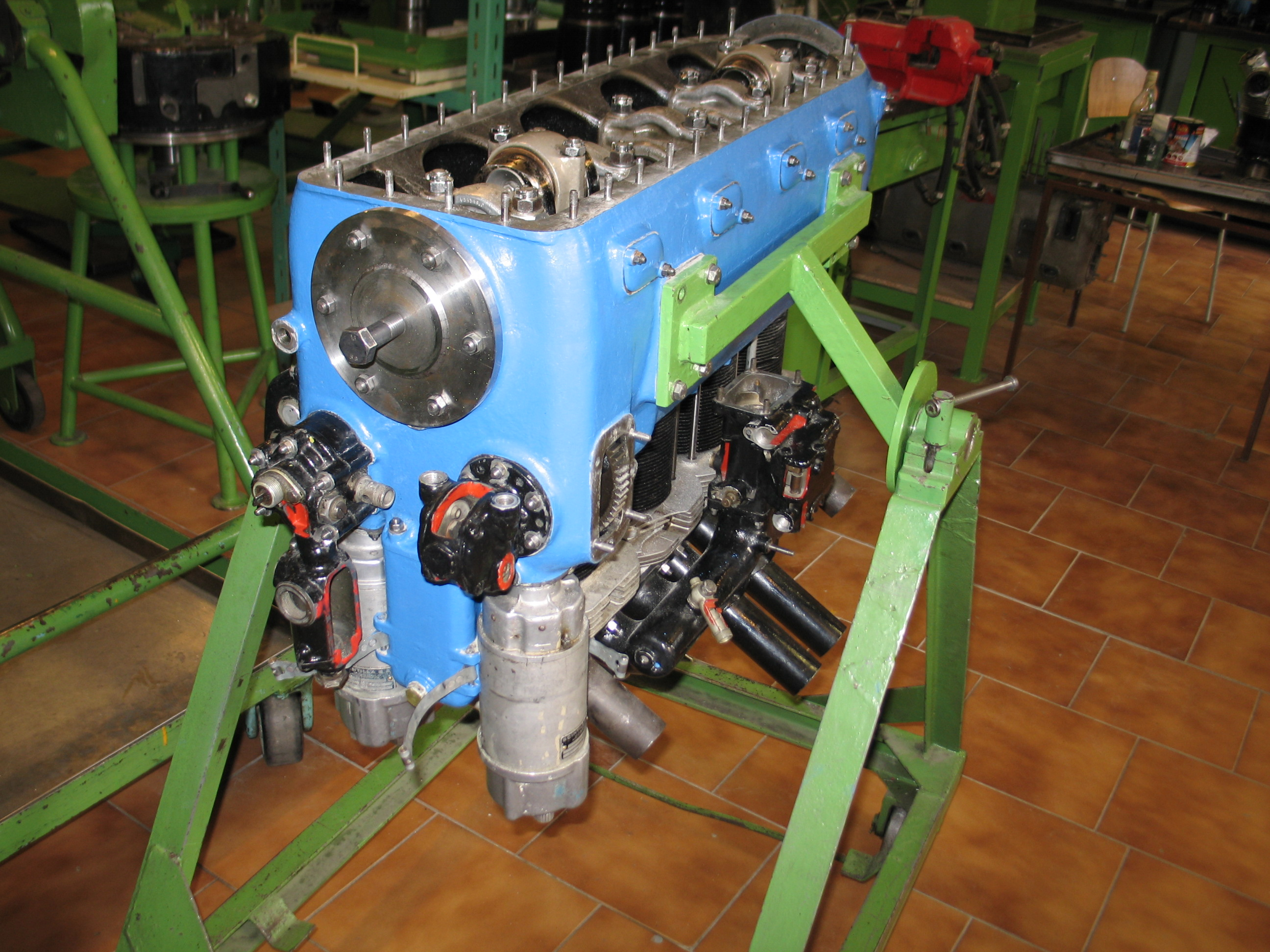
Walter Minor 4-III

Data from: Oldengine.org

=== General characteristics ===
- Type: 4-cylinder inverted inline air-cooled
- Bore: 105 mm (4.14 in)
- Stroke: 115 mm (4.53 in)
- Displacement: 4 L (244 cu in)
- Length: 1,119 mm (44.09 in)
- Width: 440 mm (17.32 in)
- Height: 630 mm (24.80 in)
- Dry weight: 93 kg (205 lb)

=== Components ===
- Valvetrain: 1 inlet and 1 exhaust valve per cylinder
- Fuel system: 1 Claudel carburetor
- Fuel type: 68 octane
- Cooling system: Air-cooled

=== Performance ===
- Power output: 95 hp (71 kW) at 2,550 rpm
- Compression ratio: 5.3:1
- Power-to-weight ratio: 0.76 kW/kg (0.46 hp/lb) at cruise power

== See also ==
Comparable engines

- Argus As 8
- Blackburn Cirrus Minor
- de Havilland Gipsy Minor

Related lists

- List of aircraft engines
