= SNCAC NC.130 =

NC.130

General information
- Type: Research aircraft
- National origin: France
- Manufacturer: Société Nationale de Constructions Aéronautiques du Centre
- Number built: 1

History
- First flight: 10 October 1939

The SNCAC NC.130 was a French high-altitude research aircraft of the 1930s. A single example flew in 1939, but was destroyed during the Second World War.

== Design and development ==
The French aircraft manufacturer Farman designed and built the Farman F.1000 series of high altitude aircraft in the early 1930s. When Farman was nationalised to form part of the Société Nationale de Constructions Aéronautiques du Centre (SNCAC) in 1936, SNCAC continued its interest in high altitude aircraft, proposing a number of high-altitude projects, including the NC.140 four-engined heavy bomber (a pressurised derivative of the Farman F.223.3) and the twin-engined NC.150 bomber.

In order to aid the design of these projects and, in particular, the pressure cabins that they needed, SNCAC designed a pressurised twin-engined research aircraft, the SNCAC NC.130. The NC.130 was a low-winged cantilever monoplane with a fixed tailwheel undercarriage. It was powered by two 720 hp (540 kW) Hispano-Suiza 12Ybr engines. Its crew of three were accommodated in a cylindrical riveted duralumin pressure cabin in the nose of the aircraft, with the pilot provided with thick glass portholes in the upper part of the cabin to allow outward vision.

== Operational history ==
The NC.130 made its maiden flight on 10 October 1939. In May 1940, it was evacuated to the former Hanriot airfield at Bourges to escape the German invasion, interrupting the aircraft's test programme, it having flown 41 hours 18 minutes by this time. The evacuation was not successful, as the NC.130 was destroyed later that year.

== Specifications ==
Data from French Projects—1940

General characteristics

- Crew: 3
- Length: 11.75 m (38 ft 7 in)
- Wingspan: 16.63 m (54 ft 7 in)
- Height: 4.19 m (13 ft 9 in)
- Wing area: 40.30 m^{2} (433.8 sq ft)
- Gross weight: 4,501 kg (9,922 lb)
- Powerplant: 2 × Hispano-Suiza 12Ybr liquid-cooled V12 engines, 540 kW (730 hp) each

Performance

- Maximum speed: 300.0 km/h (186.4 mph, 162.0 kn)
- Service ceiling: 10,600 m (34,776 ft)

== See also ==
Aircraft of comparable role, configuration, and era

- Henschel Hs 130
