= Potez 75 =

French ground-attack aircraft prototype

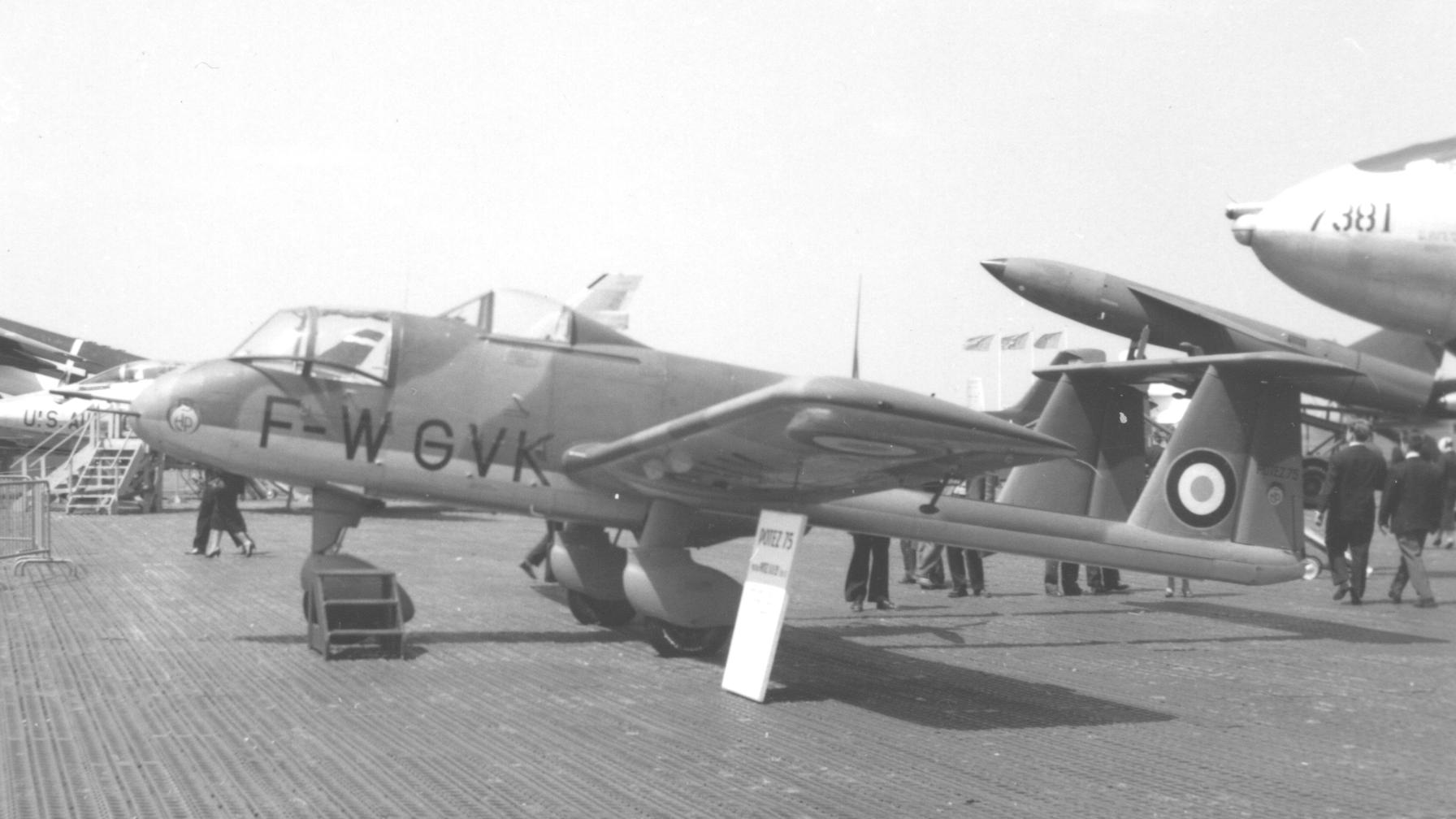
- The Potez 75 prototype exhibited at the Paris Air Salon in May 1957. It shows the later enclosed pilot's position and fully glazed cockpit.

General information
- Type: Light ground attack aircraft
- National origin: France
- Manufacturer: Potez
- Status: Scrapped
- Number built: 1

History
- First flight: 10 June 1953

The Potez 75 was a low-cost, simple, ground-support, observation and launch aircraft for anti-tank missiles, designed and built in the early 1950s, for use in colonial conflicts. An order for 115 was placed in 1956, but cancelled in 1957.

== Design and development ==
The Potez 75 was developed by the reformed Potez Company which had originally been founded by Henry Potez in 1919. The type was designed to meet the requirement for a launching platform for Nord SS.10 wire-guided anti-tank missiles. It was of all-metal construction, with a pusher engine. The twin fins and tailplane were carried on two booms extending from the lower rear fuselage and it was fitted with a fixed tricycle undercarriage. The missile operator sat in the nose, behind which was a small upper cabin accommodating the pilot. Initially the operator's cabin had windows and the pilot's position was open, but later modifications enclosed the latter and provided the operator with better visibility by full glazing.

== Operational history ==
The aircraft first flew on 10 June 1953 with experimental registration F-ZWSA, but later as F-WGVK and finally as the military F-MAFY. It had four 7.5 mm guns in the lower nose and could carry eight under-wing rockets. It was tested by the French military and found unsatisfactory as a missile platform. It was modified to light ground attack configuration and tested in the Algerian War, excelling in this role and orders were placed for 15 pre-production and 100 production machines in 1956. This order was cancelled the following year as part of defence budget cuts. Exhibited at the May 1957 Paris Air Show, the prototype was subsequently used as a liaison aircraft and scrapped after crash landing on 16 September 1958.

== Specifications ==
Data from Aircraft of the World, Jane's all the World's Aircraft 1955-56, Fliegerweb: Potez 75

General characteristics

- Crew: 2
- Length: 9.16 m (30 ft 1 in)
- Wingspan: 13.1 m (43 ft 0 in)
- Height: 2.75 m (9 ft 0 in)
- Wing area: 28.7 m^{2} (309 sq ft)
- Aspect ratio: 5.98
- Empty weight: 1,780 kg (3,924 lb)
- Gross weight: 2,515 kg (5,545 lb)
- Max takeoff weight: 2,865 kg (6,316 lb)
- Fuel capacity: 1,200 L (320 US gal; 260 imp gal)
- Powerplant: 1 × Potez 8D.32 inverted V-8 air-cooled piston engine, 480 kW (640 hp) at take-off

183 kW (245 hp) at 3,500 m (11,500 ft)

- Propellers: 3-bladed variable-pitch pusher propeller, 2.8 m (9 ft 2 in) diameter

Performance

- Maximum speed: 275 km/h (171 mph, 148 kn) at sea level

294 km/h (183 mph; 159 kn) at 3,000 m (9,800 ft)

- Cruise speed: 234 km/h (145 mph, 126 kn) at 2,000 m (6,600 ft)
- Range: 660 km (410 mi, 360 nmi)
- Ferry range: 780 km (480 mi, 420 nmi)
- Endurance: 3 hours 20 minutes
- Service ceiling: 8,600 m (28,200 ft)
- Rate of climb: 5.8 m/s (1,140 ft/min)
- Time to altitude: 1,000 m (3,300 ft) in 3 minutes

3,000 m (9,800 ft) in 10 minutes

- Wing loading: 99.8 kg/m^{2} (20.4 lb/sq ft)
- Power/mass: 0.15 kW/kg (0.091 hp/lb)
- Take-off run: 290 m (950 ft)
- Landing run: 320 m (1,050 ft)

Armament

- Guns:

- 1 × 12.7 mm (0.500 in) DEFA machine gun with 480 rounds
- 4 × 7.5 mm (0.295 in) fixed machine-guns in the nose with 1000 rpg

- Rockets: 8 × under-wing rockets
- Missiles: 8 × Nord SS.10 wire-guided anti-tank missiles
