= SCAN 20 =

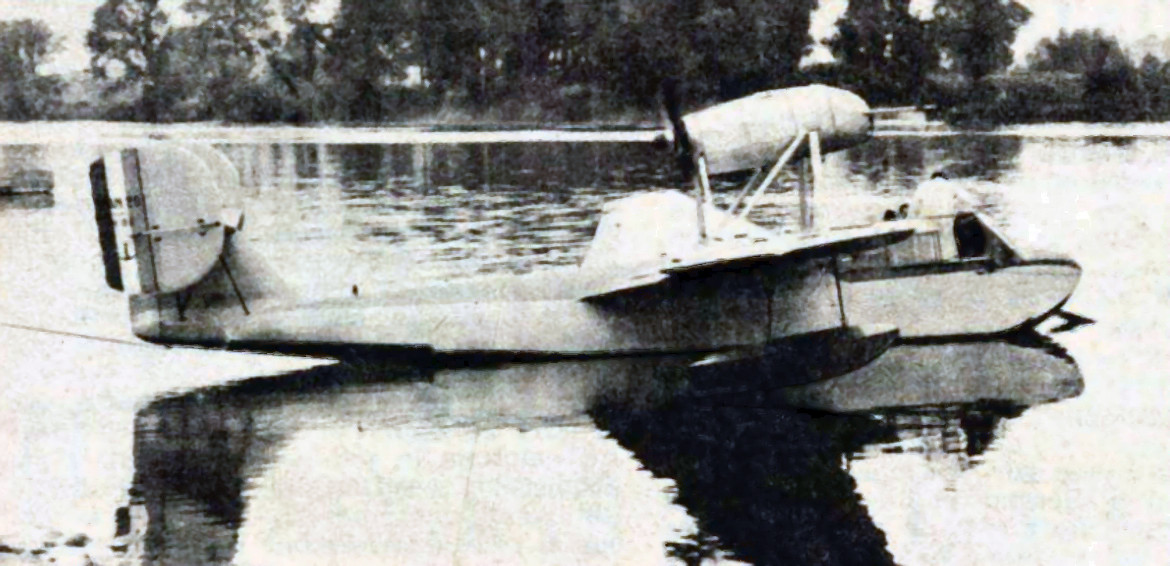

General information
- Type: Flying-boat trainer
- National origin: France
- Manufacturer: SCAN
- Primary user: French Navy
- Number built: 24

History
- Introduction date: 1951
- First flight: 1945

The SCAN 20 was a 1940s French flying-boat training monoplane designed and built by Société de Constructions Aéro-Navales de Port-Neuf (SCAN). The prototype was built in secret in 1941. It was hidden until the liberation of France and first flown in 1945.

== Design and development ==
The SCAN 20 was designed to meet a French Air Ministry requirement for a small flying-boat trainer. The SCAN 20 was a high-wing cantilever monoplane flying-boat with strut-mounted floats under each wing. It had twin fin with rudders on a raised tailplane and an enclosed cockpit with side-by-side seating for two. Built in secret during 1941 it was not flown until after the liberation of France in October 1945. The prototype had a single 425 hp (317 kW) Béarn 6D inline engine strut-mounted above the wing. An order for 30 aircraft with a more powerful engine was placed for the French Navy but only 23 were delivered.

== Operators ==
France

- French Navy

== Specifications ==
Data from Jane's all the World's Aircraft 1947

General characteristics

- Crew: 2
- Capacity: 2 pax
- Length: 11.79 m (38 ft 8 in)
- Wingspan: 15 m (49 ft 3 in)
- Height: 3.62 m (11 ft 11 in)
- Wing area: 32 m^{2} (340 sq ft)
- Max takeoff weight: 2,500 kg (5,512 lb)
- Powerplant: 1 × Béarn 6D 6-cyl in-line air-cooled piston engine, 242 kW (325 hp) :::or

1x Potez 8D V-8

or

1x Salmson 8 As.00 V-8

- Propellers: 3-bladed Ratier variable-pitch pusher propeller

Performance

- Maximum speed: 230 km/h (140 mph, 120 kn) at 2,000 m (6,600 ft)
- Cruise speed: 200 km/h (120 mph, 110 kn) *Alighting speed: 80 km/h (50 mph; 43 kn)}
- Range: 1,000 km (620 mi, 540 nmi)
- Service ceiling: 5,000 m (16,000 ft)
- Wing loading: 78.1 kg/m^{2} (16.0 lb/sq ft)

== See also ==
Related lists

- List of seaplanes and flying boats
