= Béarn 6 =

Béarn 6D
- Type: 6-cyl. inverted air-cooled inline piston aircraft engine
- National origin: France
- Manufacturer: Constructions mécaniques du Béarn (CMB)

The Béarn 6 was a six-cylinder air-cooled piston aircraft engine produced in France in the late 1930s, 1940s and early 1950s.

== Design and development ==
The Béarn 6 suffered from lack of development and was not a commercial success, most production engines had been removed from service by 1950 due to poor reliability.

== Variants ==
6C
6D
6D.07

== Applications ==
- Dassault MD-303
- Nord 2101 Norazur
- Dewoitine HD.731
- SFCA Lignel 16
- S.C.A.N. 20
- SNCASO SO.90
- SNCASE SE-700A
- S.N.C.A.C. NC.420

== Specifications (Béarn 6D) ==
Data from Aircraft Engines of the World 1946.

=== General characteristics ===
- Type: 6 cylinder, inverted, in-line, four-stroke piston engine
- Bore: 130 mm (5.12 in)
- Stroke: 135 mm (5.31 in)
- Displacement: 10.7 L (653 cu in)
- Length: 1,500 mm (59.06 in)
- Width: 450 mm (17.72 in)
- Height: 825 mm (32.48 in)
- Dry weight: 290 kg (640 lb)
- Frontal Area: 0.33 m^{2} (3.6 sq ft)

=== Components ===
- Valvetrain: 2 overhead valves per cylinder, pushrod actuated.
- Supercharger: Gear driven single-speed supercharger with 11.15:1 gear ratio.
- Fuel system: 1x Zenith 80RGSL-05 updraught carburettor with automatic boost control
- Fuel type: 87 octane petrol
- Oil system: Pressure fed at 4.8 bar (70 psi), dry sump
- Cooling system: Air-cooled
- Reduction gear: Planetary reduction gear, 0.67:1 ratio adapted for Ratier or Chauvière variable-pitch propellers
- Starter: Air Equipment 51020 electric inertia starter
- Ignition: 2 x R.B. GPBA magnetos, 2 x spark plugs per cylinder fed by a shielded ignition harness.

=== Performance ===
- Power output:
  - Take-off: 310 kW (410 hp) at 2,800rpm, 1,160 mm (46 in) / +3.6 kg (7.9 lb) boost with 100/130 octane petrol
  - Normal: 260 kW (350 hp) at 2,700rpm at 2,000 m (6,600 ft)
  - Cruising: 190 kW (260 hp) at 2,200rpm at 2,000 m (6,600 ft)
- Specific power: 27.89 kW/L (0.63 hp/cu.in)
- Compression ratio: 7.2:1
- Specific fuel consumption: 0.322 kg/(kW h) (0.53 lb/(hp h))
- Oil consumption: 0.00669 kg/(kW h)(0.011 lb/(hp h))
- Power-to-weight ratio: 0.968 kW/kg (0.585 hp/lb)

== See also ==
Related lists

- List of aircraft engines
