= SNCAC NC.271 =

1940s French aircraft

NC.271

General information
- Type: Experimental aircraft
- National origin: France
- Manufacturer: Aérocentre / Société Nationale de Constructions Aéronautiques du Centre (SNCAC)
- Number built: 2

History
- First flight: 28 January 1949 (free flight)

The SNCAC NC.271 was a French experimental aircraft built by SNCAC in the late 1940s, as a 1:2.5 scale model of the proposed SNCAC NC.270 jet bomber, featuring swept-back wings, using SNCASE SE-161 Languedoc N0.31 F-BCUT as a launch platform.

== Variants ==
NC.270
A proposed jet bomber, to have been powered by two Rolls-Royce Nene turbojet engines. Development was curtailed in June 1949 with the liquidation of the Aerocentre combine.
NC.271-01
A 1:2.5 scale NC.270 glider research aircraft; first free flight on 28 January 1949.
NC.271-02
A powered version of the NC.271, fitted with a 7.848 kN (1,764 lbf) Walter HWK 109-509A liquid-fuelled rocket engine; development was abandoned with the collapse of Aérocentre.

== Specifications (NC.271-01) ==
Data from Aviafrance: NC.271, Les Avions Francais de 1944 a 1964

General characteristics

- Crew: One
- Length: 8.11 m (26 ft 7 in)
- Wingspan: 7.60 m (24 ft 11 in)
- Height: 2.94 m (9 ft 8 in)
- Wing area: 11.44 m^{2} (123.1 sq ft)
- Max takeoff weight: 1,725 kg (3,803 lb)

Max Take-off weight NC.271-02: 3,400 kg (7,500 lb)

- Powerplant: 1 × Walter HWK 109-509A liquid-fuelled rocket, 7.848 kN (1,764 lbf) thrust (NC.271-02)

Performance

- Maximum speed: 900 km/h (560 mph, 490 kn) (NC.271-02)

== Bibliography ==
- Buttler, Tony. X-Planes of Europe II: Military Prototype Aircraft from the Golden Age 1946–1974. Manchester, UK: Hikoki Publications, 2015. ISBN 978-1-90210-948-0
- Carbonel, Jean-Christophe (2017). French Secret Projects. Vol. 2: Cold War Bombers, Patrol and Assault Aircraft. Manchester, UK: Crecy Publishing. ISBN 978-1-91080-906-8.
- Gaillard, Pierre (November 1970). "Il aurait du être le "Canberra" français: N.C.270" [It Should Have Been the French Canberra]. Le album de fanatique de l'Aviation (in French) (16): 20–22. ISSN 0757-4169.
- Ricco, Philippe (December 1998). "NC-270, le bombardier à réaction qui volait par procuration" [NC-270: The Jet Boomber that Flew by Proxy]. Le Fana de l'Aviation (in French) (349): 18–27. ISSN 0757-4169.
