= Turkish regional jet project =

Turkish Regional Jet TRJ-328 TRJ-628
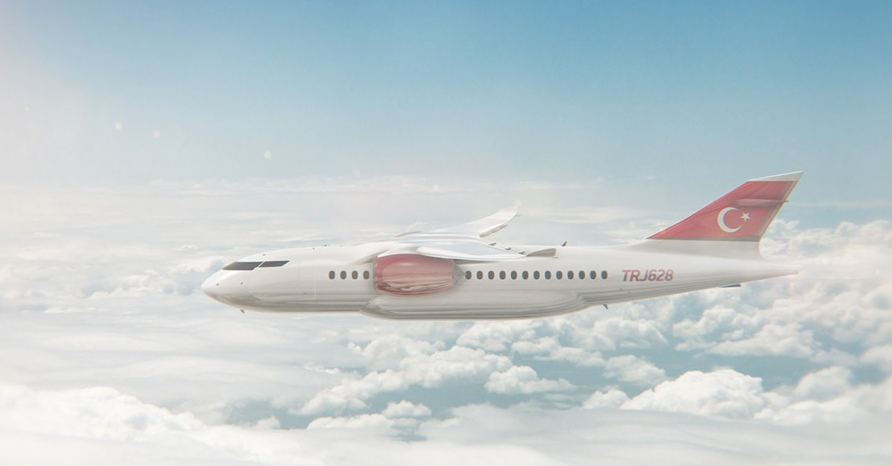
- Concept art of the TRJ-628

General information
- Type: Regional jet
- National origin: Turkey
- Manufacturer: Sierra Nevada Corporation
- Status: Cancelled in 2017

History
- Introduction date: 2015

The Turkish Regional Jet (TRJ) was a project to produce Turkey's first regional airplane. The project would use a modified version of the Dornier 328, the TRJ-328 and TRJ-628. The project was cancelled in 2017 because it was “economically unfeasible”.

== TRJ-328 ==
The TRJ-328 was to be used as a test bed for the TRJ-628. Capacity was to be limited to 32 seats. The aircraft would fill direct and frequent flights to and from small cities in Turkey which were not then possible with larger aircraft.

== TRJ-628 ==
The TRJ-628 was to feature 60 to 70 seats and would be an overall larger airplane.
