= Farman NC.470 =

NC.470
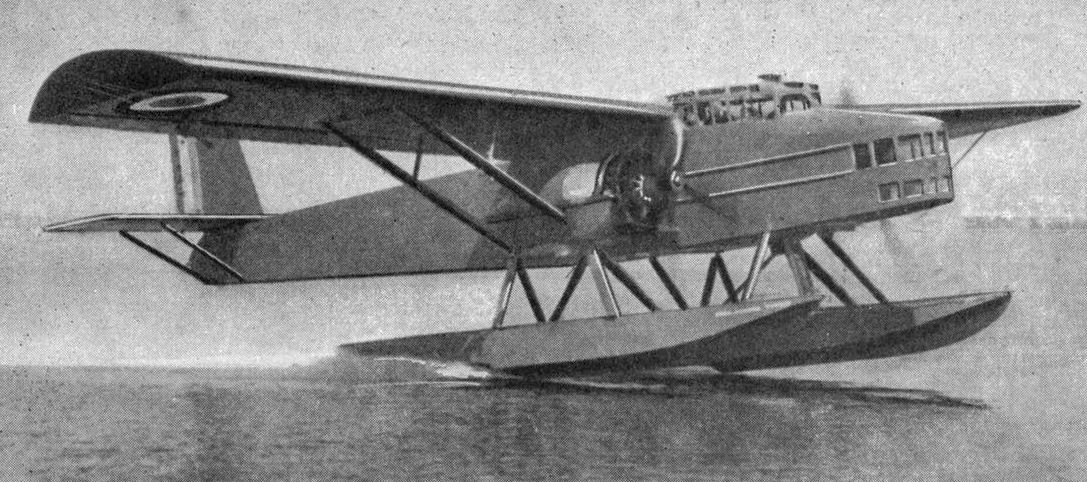
- Farman F.470

General information
- Type: Trainer floatplane
- National origin: France
- Manufacturer: SNCAC
- Primary user: French Navy
- Number built: 35

History
- First flight: 27 December 1937

The Farman NC.470 (also known as the Centre N.C-470 when Farman was nationalised to form SNCAC) was a French twin-engined floatplane designed as a crew trainer for the French Navy. It was used in small numbers for both its intended role as a trainer and as a coastal reconnaissance aircraft at the start of World War II.

== Development and design ==
In 1935, the Farman Aviation Works designed as a private venture the F-470, a twin-engined floatplane intended to be used as a crew trainer by the French Navy. A production order for ten aircraft was placed on 8 March 1936, it being intended that these aircraft would use spare floats, propellers and engines left over from now retired Farman F.168 torpedo bombers.

In 1936, Farman was nationalised, and merged with Hanriot to form the Société Nationale de Constructions Aéronautiques du Centre or SNCAC. The prototype, now redesignated NC-470, first flew, with a temporary wheeled undercarriage, on 27 December 1937.

The NC.470 was a twin-engined high-winged monoplane of mixed metal and wood construction, with two radial engines mounted on low mounted stub wings. It had a slab sided fuselage, housing the crew of two pilots in a tandem cockpit, a navigator/bombardier in the nose and a radio operator, flight engineer and gunner in the rear fuselage. The aircraft was designed to carry an armament of a single Darne machine gun on an open dorsal cockpit, together with up to 200 kg (440 lb) of bombs.

The first order for 10 NC.470s was completed by mid-1939, together with a single example of the NC.471, powered by a different model of Gnome et Rhône radial engine. Further orders brought production of the NC.470 to a total of 34.

== Operational history ==
While intended as a crew trainer, a shortage of coastal reconnaissance aircraft resulted in NC.470s being drafted into this role, with three NC-470s and the sole NC-471 being used together with three CAMS 55 flying boats to equip Escadrille 3S4 at Berre in August 1939. The NC-470 was also used by the aircrew training school at Hourtin. Fourteen aircraft were captured by Germany during the occupation of Southern France in November 1942.

== Variants ==
NC.470
Main production aircraft. Powered by two 358 kW (480 hp) Gnome-Rhône 9Akx radial engines; 34 built.
NC.471
Revised version, powered by 373 kW (500 hp) Gnome-Rhône 9Kgr engines; 2 built.
NC.472
Proposed version powered by 447 kW (599 hp) Pratt & Whitney R-1340 Wasp engines; unbuilt.

== Operators ==
France

- French Navy

== Specifications (NC.471) ==
Data from War Planes of the Second World War Volume Six, and Aviafrance : S.N.C.A.C. NC-471

General characteristics

- Crew: 6
- Length: 16.1 m (52 ft 10 in)
- Wingspan: 24.45 m (80 ft 3 in)
- Height: 4.85 m (15 ft 11 in)
- Wing area: 95.00 m^{2} (1,022.6 sq ft)
- Empty weight: 3,717 kg (8,195 lb)
- Gross weight: 6,013 kg (13,256 lb)
- Powerplant: 2 × Gnome-Rhône 9Kgr 9-cylinder air-cooled radial piston engines, 373 kW (500 hp) each
- Propellers: 3-bladed constant-speed propellers

Performance

- Maximum speed: 230 km/h (140 mph, 120 kn)
- Cruise speed: 190 km/h (120 mph, 100 kn)
- Range: 1,140 km (710 mi, 620 nmi)
- Endurance: 6 hours
- Service ceiling: 6,000 m (20,000 ft)
- Time to altitude: 2,000 m (6,600 ft) in 9 minutes 40 seconds
- Wing loading: 63.3 kg/m^{2} (13.0 lb/sq ft)
- Power/mass: 0.12 kW/kg (0.073 hp/lb)

Armament

- Guns: 1 × 7.5 mm (0.295 in) Darne machine gun firing the 7.5x54mm French cartridge
- Bombs: 4 × 50 kg (110 lb) bombs

== See also ==
Related lists

- List of aircraft of World War II
- List of seaplanes and flying boats

== Bibliography ==
- Donald, David (editor). The Encyclopedia of World Aircraft. Leicester, UK:Blitz, 1997. ISBN 1-85605-375-X.
- Green, William. War Planes of the Second World War: Volume Five Flying Boats. London:Macdonald,1968. ISBN 0-356-01449-5.
- Green, William. War Planes of the Second World War: Volume Six Floatplanes. London:Macdonald, 1962.
- Liron, Jean (1984). Les avions Farman. Collection Docavia. Vol. 21. Paris: Éditions Larivière. OCLC 37146471.
