= SNCAC NC.150 =

High-altitude bomber

NC.150
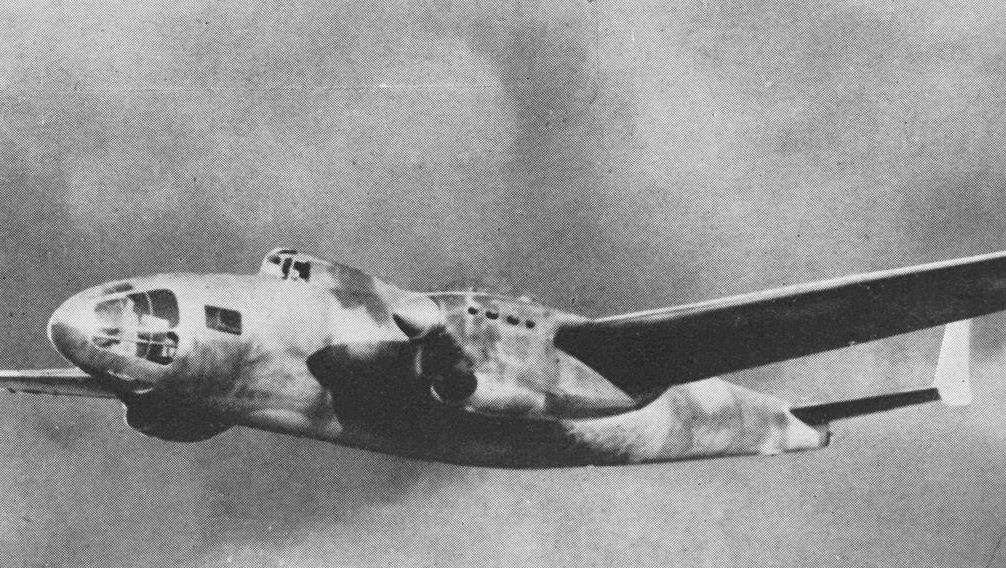

General information
- Type: High-altitude bomber
- National origin: France
- Manufacturer: SNCAC
- Number built: 1

History
- First flight: 11 May 1939

The SNCAC NC.150 (also known as the Centre NC.150) was a prototype French high-altitude bomber aircraft designed and flown just prior to the start of the Second World War. It was a twin-engined monoplane, with a third engine driving a supercharger. Although testing was promising, and orders were planned for a modified version as a back-up for the Lioré et Olivier LeO 45 and Amiot 354 bombers, the surrender of France in June 1940 ended development with only the single example being built.

== Design and development ==
When the nationalisation of the French aircraft industry resulted in the creation of the Société Nationale de Constructions Aéronautiques du Centre (SNCAC) from the merger of Farman Aviation Works and Hanriot in 1936, the new company inherited Farman's experience in high-altitude research, and this research continued. In 1937, it proposed a pressurised transatlantic mailplane derivative of the Farman F.223.3 bomber, this being developed into the unpressurised NC.223.4 transport, of which three were built for Air France.

SNCAC continued work on high-altitude aircraft, proposing two pressurised bombers in 1938. The first, the NC.140, was a four-engined bomber using the wings of the Farman F.223.3 but was quickly abandoned in favour of the smaller, twin-engined NC.150. The NC.150 was a mid-winged monoplane with a retractable tailwheel undercarriage which was designed to make maximum use of non-strategic materials such as wood. The wings were of mixed construction, with a metal centre-section, and wood outer wings that had metal spars, wooden ribs and plywood skinning. Similarly, the fuselage had wooden forward and aft fuselage section connecting to the metal centre section, while the twin tail was of wooden construction with plywood skinning. It was to be powered by two Hispano-Suiza 12Y V12 engines, with power being maintained at high altitudes by using a single three-stage supercharger driven by a separate Hispano-Suiza 12X engine mounted in the fuselage.

SNCAC began work on two prototypes as a private venture in 1938. These two prototypes were not to be fitted with cabin pressurisation, although this was planned for a third prototype. The French Air Ministry placed an order for the two prototypes on 24 April 1939, with the second aircraft to carry full armament. The first prototype, designated NC.150.01, made its maiden flight from Toussus-le-Noble on 11 May 1939. Meanwhile, the French Air Ministry had become worried about possible delays to the Lioré et Olivier LeO 45 and Amiot 354 twin-engined bombers which were planned to re-equip the medium bomber squadrons of the Armée de l'Air caused by shortages of light alloys, and after successful testing in early 1940, ordered a change of plans. Pressurisation was to be abandoned, and the unusual central supercharger with its dedicated engine (known as the "bi-tri" concept) was to be replaced by individually supercharged engines. Two production versions were planned, the NC.152, powered by Hispano-Suiza engines, and the NC.153, with imported American radial engines.

Development was stopped, however, by France's surrender to Germany in June 1940, both the second and third prototypes being abandoned before completion.

== Variants ==
NC.150.01
First prototype. Not fitted with pressurisation and unarmed.
NC.150.02
Second prototype. Unpressurised but to be fitted with full armament. Not completed.
NC.151.03
Third prototype, representing original bomber design, with pressure cabin and full armament. Not completed.
NC.152
Planned production version powered by two supercharged Hispano-Suiza 12Y engines.
NC.153
Planned production version powered by two supercharged 1,850 hp (1,380 kW) Pratt & Whitney R-2800 S1A4-G Double Wasp radial engines.

== Specifications (NC.150 - armament planned for 150.02) ==
Data from War Planes of the Second World War:Volume Seven Bombers and Reconnaissance Aircraft

General characteristics

- Crew: Four
- Length: 17.60 m (57 ft 9 in)
- Wingspan: 21.882 m (71 ft 9.5 in)
- Height: 4.19 m (13 ft 9 in)
- Wing area: 61.10 m^{2} (657.7 sq ft)
- Empty weight: 7,733 kg (17,048 lb)
- Gross weight: 10,077 kg (22,216 lb)
- Powerplant: 2 × Hispano-Suiza 12Y 32/33 liquid-cooled V12 engines, 720 kW (960 hp) each
- Powerplant: 1 × Hispano-Suiza 12Xirs liquid-cooled V12 engine driving NC-C2 supercharger, 510 kW (690 hp)

Performance

- Maximum speed: 600 km/h (373 mph, 324 kn) at 8,000 m (26,250 ft)
- Cruise speed: 510 km/h (317 mph, 275 kn) at 8,000 m (26,250 ft) (long-range cruise)
- Range: 2,200 km (1,367 mi, 1,188 nmi)
- Service ceiling: 11,380 m (37,350 ft)
- Time to altitude: 19 min 7 s to 8,000 m (26,250 ft)

Armament

- Guns: ** 1 × 20-mm Hispano-Suiza HS.404 cannon in power operated dorsal mounting,
  - 1 × 7.5 mm MAC 1934 machine gun in nose,
  - 1 × machine gun in ventral mounting
- Bombs: 1,200 kg (2,650 lb) bombs

== See also ==
Aircraft of comparable role, configuration, and era

- Lioré et Olivier LeO 45
- Amiot 354
- Petlyakov Pe-8 - originally planned with similar central engine driven supercharger
