= SNECMA Atar Volant =

French turbojet engine

Atar Volant
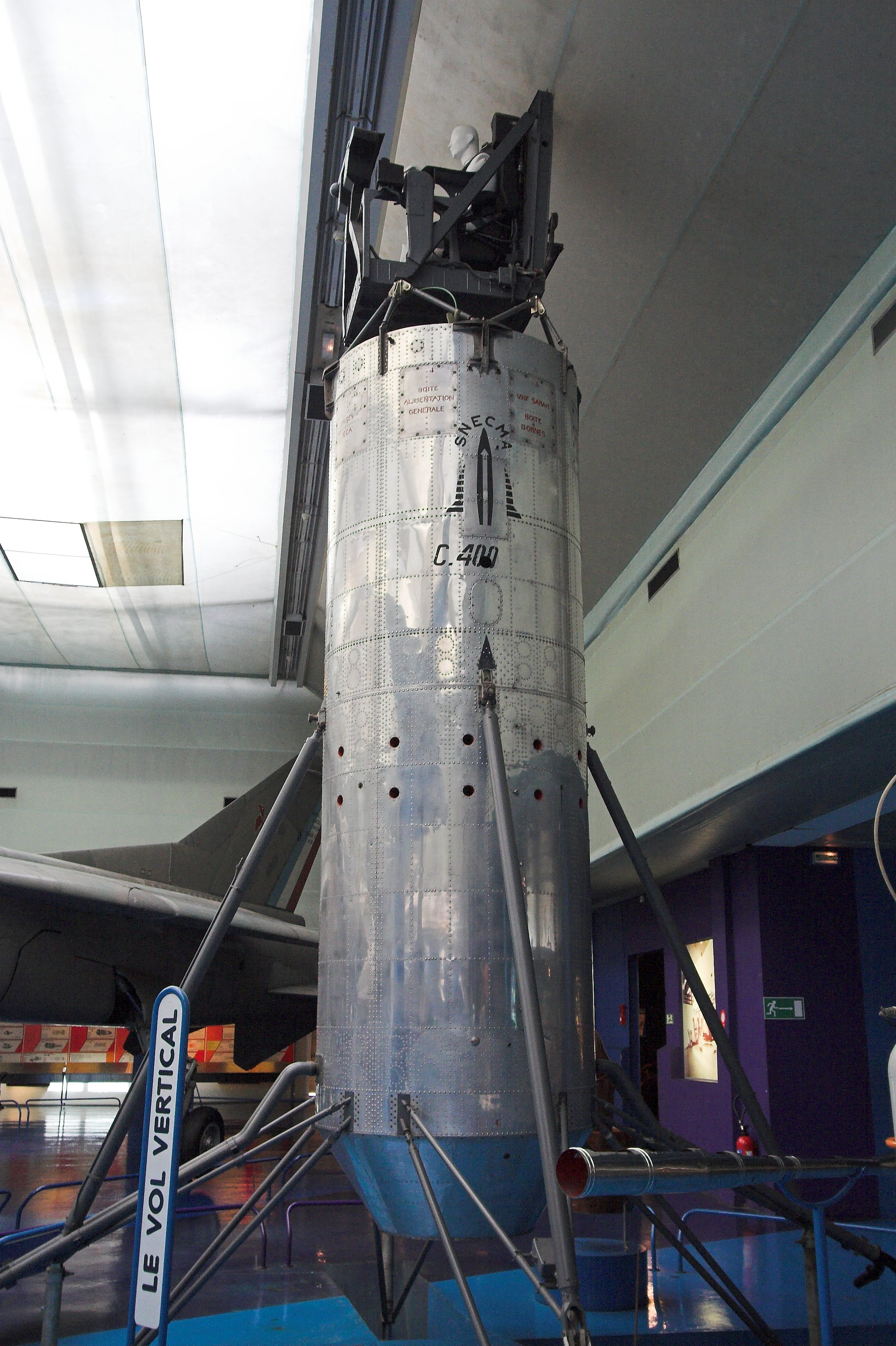
- Atar Volant C.400 P2
- Type: Turbojet
- National origin: France
- Manufacturer: Snecma
- Number built: 3
- Developed into: SNECMA C.450 Coléoptère

The SNECMA Atar Volant or C.400 P1, was a French turbojet engine produced by SNECMA as part of their "Atar" series. Encased in a basic fairing which could hold fuel and remote-control equipment, the unit weighed 5,600 pounds (2,500 kg), and generated a thrust of approximately 6,200 pounds-force (27.6 kN); the Atar Volant was able to cause vertical lift, which was precisely its purpose. There were later Atar Volant models, each making improvements and alterations to the previous designs, which eventually resulted in a fully fledged craft.

== Background and purpose ==
The Coléoptère was a VTOL or "Vertical Take-Off and Landing" aircraft that was designed by SNECMA during the 1950s. While the Coléoptère was not the first VTOL aircraft, none of its predecessors had an annular wing designed to land vertically. The benefit of this annular wing was the requirement for very little landing or take-off space. However, the design of the Coléoptère met with many problems, such as overcoming the torque imparted to a vertical engine by its own turbine wheels and rotating compressor, and discovering and developing a method of balancing the craft on the column of air released from its jet pipe during the take-off and landing phase, as well as, more particularly, during manoeuvres out of the vertical positioning. To address some of these problems, as well as to provide a way to achieve vertical lift, SNECMA set to work on what was to become the first model of the Atar Volants.

== Improvements, alterations and later models ==
There were at least four Atar Volant models constructed, each improving or making alterations on the last: the first (C.400 P.1), C.400 P.2, C.400 P.3. and the last, the C.450-01. The second in the series had much success at an international air display in Le Bourget, in Paris, and the third became a full-scale coleopter in its own right, due to numerous improvements and alterations made to the model. The C.450-01 model's maiden flight took place in May 1959. Two months later, while being put through its paces, the single prototype crashed. The pilot was seriously injured, and the prototype wrecked, resulting in the abandoning of its development and the project.

== Variants ==
Data from: Jane's All the World's Aircraft 1958-59

C.400 P.1
First remotely piloted research vehicle powered by a 28.44 kN (6,393 lbf) Atar 101DV mounted vertically.
C.400 P.2
The second research vehicle with an ejection seat for the pilot, sat on top of the fuselage. First free flight on 14 May 1957
C.400 P.3
The third research vehicle with a tilting ejection seat in an enclosed cockpit, similar to that of the SNECMA C.450 Coléoptère.

== Specifications (C.400 P.2) ==
Data from Jane's All the World's Aircraft 1958-59,

General characteristics

- Crew: 1
- Length: 7 m (23 ft 0 in)
- Diameter: 1.5 m (4 ft 11 in)
- Empty weight: 2,000 kg (4,409 lb)
- Gross weight: 2,600 kg (5,732 lb)
- Fuel capacity: 500 kg (1,102 lb)
- Powerplant: 1 × Atar 101DV turbojet engine, 28.04 kN (6,303 lbf) thrust vertically-mounted with jet-deflection nozzle

Performance

- Endurance: 4 minutes +

== See also ==
- History of Aviation
- List of VTOL aircraft

== Bibliography ==
- Buttler, Tony & Delezenne, Jean-Louis (2012). X-Planes of Europe: Secret Research Aircraft from the Golden Age 1946-1974. Manchester, UK: Hikoki Publications. ISBN 978-1-902-10921-3.
- Carbonel, Jean-Christophe (2016). French Secret Projects. Vol. 1: Post War Fighters. Manchester, UK: Crecy Publishing. ISBN 978-1-91080-900-6.
- Roux, Robert J. (May 1977). "Atar Volant et Coléoptère (2): de drôles de bêtes du temps passé" [Atar Volant and Coleoptère, Part 2: Funny Beasts from the Past]. Le Fana de l'Aviation (in French) (90): 6–9. ISSN 0757-4169.
