= Sud-Est Grognard =

1950 French ground-attack aircraft

- SE.2410 Grognard I

General information
- Type: Ground-attack aircraft
- National origin: France
- Manufacturer: Sud-Est
- Number built: 2

History
- First flight: 30 April 1950
- Retired: 1952

The SNCASE Grognard was a single-seat ground-attack aircraft designed and produced by the French aircraft manufacturer Sud-Est. Due to its unconventional and unaesthetic configuration, it garnered the derisive nickname "Hunchback".

Development of the Grognard was launched in 1946 in response to the issuing of a specification by the Armée de l'Air for a new ground attack aircraft. In response, Sud-Est designed the SE.2410, which had an unorthodox arrangement and was powered by a pair of licence-built Rolls-Royce Nene turbojet engines. On 30 April 1950, the SE.2410 prototype performed its maiden flight. Following initial flight testing, a refined twin-seat model, the SE.2415, was promptly developed. During armaments trials, the Grognard became the first French aircraft to fire an air-to-air missile. Specification changes enacted by the Armée de l'Air impacted the programme; at one stage, the SE.2421 "all-weather" fighter model and the SE.2418 attack model were being worked towards. However, work on the Grognard was ultimately terminated during 1952 after authorities favoured the more promising Sud-Ouest Vautour II.

== Design and development ==
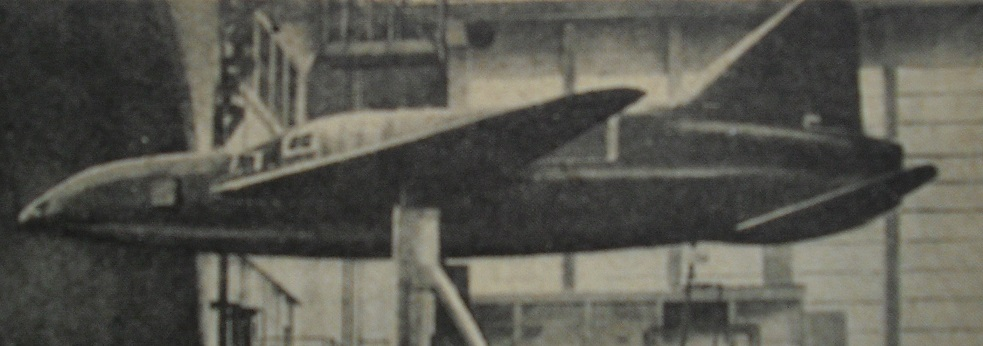
Model of the SE-2400 used for experiments in the wind tunnel of the ONERA (Chalais-Meudon) around 1950

In the aftermath of the Second World War, France set about the rebuilding and modernisation of its armed forces. In regards to aviation, this task had been made substantially more difficult due to setbacks incurred by the German occupation of France during the conflict; nearly all aircraft factories had been destroyed while individual design teams had scattered, meaning that there was little to no continuity of work and that the nation would be basically starting from scratch. Additionally, France had little technical knowledge or operational know-how with the newly developed field of jet propulsion in comparison to other powers, such as the United States and the United Kingdom. A major step towards bridging this gap was a licensing arrangement between Hispano-Suiza and British engine manufacturer Rolls-Royce Limited, under which the former would manufacture the Rolls-Royce Nene turbojet engine; accordingly, the majority of early French jet aircraft were powered by the Nene while an indigenous engine was to be developed in the form of the Snecma Atar engine.

During 1946, the Armée de l'Air issued a specification that called for a ground-attack aircraft; one goal of this specification was to incentivise France's aviation industry to produce their own indigenous jet-powered aircraft designs. The aircraft manufacturer Sud-Est decided to produce a response to this specification; early design work was heavily influenced by a series of wind tunnel tests performed using scale models by the Office National d'Etudes et de Recherches Aerospatiales (ONERA) in Chalais-Meudon. The resulting design featured a compact and bulbous fuselage and an unusual 47˚ swept wing; power was provided by a pair of stacked Nene turbojets, to which air was supplied via a single dorsal inlet. The cockpit was also unconventionally situated at the extreme end of the nose. The unorthodox nature of the aircraft's overall arrangement contributed to it quickly acquired the derisive nickname: "Hunchback".

The official name SE.2410 Grognard (French: Grumbler) was derived from the nickname for a soldier of Napoleon's Old Guard. Problems encountered in test flights led to a number of modifications to both the tail unit and ailerons. Sud-Est proceeded to build a pair of prototypes that incorporated further refinements, which were designated SE.2415 and subsequently identified as the Grognard II; this was a twin-seat development of the original design that included a stretched fuselage and a raised cockpit with a bubble canopy and reduced 32˚ wing sweep back. Following initial testing, a pair of boundary layer fences were installed on the outer wings of the SE.2415; underwing spoilers were also tested.

Although neither prototype was initially armed, the planned armaments for the type included a pair of DEFA 30mm cannon as well as bombs and rockets.

== Operational history ==
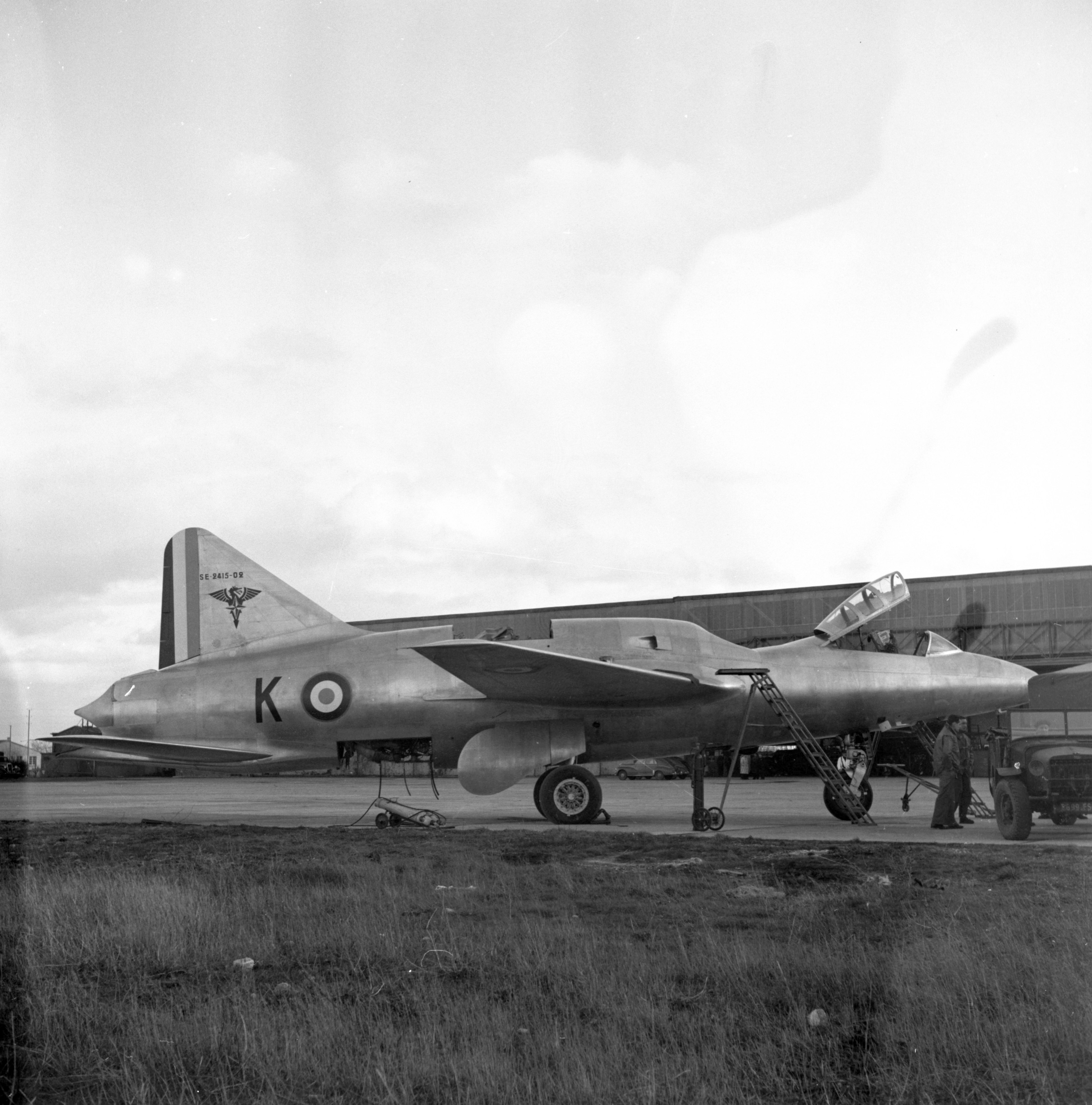
SE.2415 Grognard II, circa 1952

On 30 April 1950, the maiden flight of SE.2410 Grognard I (F-ZWRJ) took place. It was joined by the second prototype (F-ZWRK) on 14 February 1951, however, the aircraft suffered from tailplane flutter. Both prototypes underwent numerous armaments tests; notably, it became the first French aircraft to fire an air-to-air missile in the form of the Matra T-10. The Grognard II was heavily damaged in a belly landing after a false fire warning, although the airframe was salvaged and subsequently used as a target for firing tests. Amid the trials, the Armée de l'Air radically altered the specifications for fighter and bomber aircraft, virtually eliminating the attack category. This change jeopardized the continued development of the Grognard as the unpressurized airframe was not readily adaptable to other missions.

Although a dedicated "all-weather" fighter variant with a radar in the nose, the SE.2421 was planned, a definitive attack variant, the SE.2418 would have been powered by a pair of Rolls-Royce Tay turbojet engines, which could produce up to 2, 850 kgp (6,2850 lb st) and gave the aircraft an anticipated maximum speed of 1,086 km/h (675 mph) while at sea level. In terms of its basic arrangement, the SE.2418 paired the wing of the Grognard I with the lengthened fuselage and other refinements from the Grognard II. As early as January 1952, media reports were doubtful on the prospects that the Grognard would ever see serial production as it was speculated that France would procure the English Electric Canberra bomber instead. Sud-Est was preparing to undertake quantity production of the SE.2418 when the programme was terminated later that same year; this decision was made in response to a competing aircraft, the Sud Aviation Vautour multi-purpose fighter/bomber, having proved itself to be a more promising design.

The SE.2410 was promptly withdrawn; by 1954, it had reportedly been scrapped.

== Variants ==
SE.2410 Grognard I
Original specifications; one prototype.
SE.2415 Grognard II
Revised two-seat design with changes to wing, fuselage and cockpit; one prototype.
SE.2418 Grognard
Unbuilt production single-seat version with Rolls-Royce Tays replacing the Nene engines in the prototypes.
SE.2421 Grognard
Unbuilt design study for a two-seat all-weather fighter.

== Specifications (SE.2410 Grognard I) ==
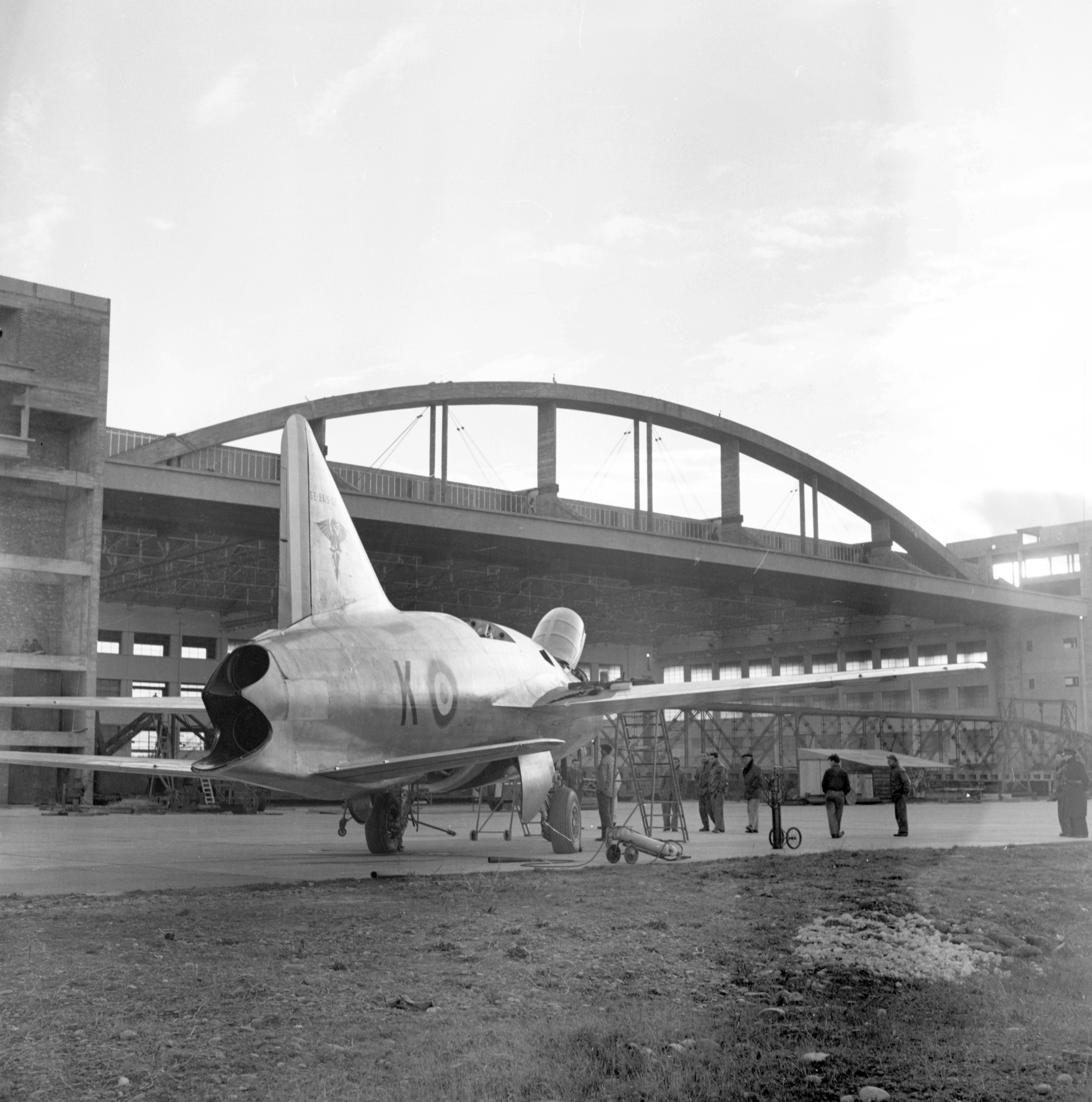
Rear view of the SE.2415 Grognard II, circa 1952

Data from The Aircraft of the World

General characteristics

- Crew: 1
- Length: 51 ft 6 in (15.4 m)
- Wingspan: 45 ft 6 in (13.57 m)
- Height: 17 ft 0 in (5.18 m)
- Wing area: 495 sq ft (150.87 m^{2})
- Max takeoff weight: 31,925 lb (14,481 kg)
- Powerplant: 2 × Rolls-Royce Nene 101 turbojet, 4,940 lbf (21.97 kN) thrust each

Performance

- Maximum speed: 645 mph (1,038 km/h, 560 kn)
- Combat range: 530 mi (853 km, 460 nmi)
- Service ceiling: 38,050 ft (11,590 m)

Armament

- Guns: 2 × 30 mm (1.2 in) DEFA cannon (planned)
- Rockets: 16 x 65 kg (143 lb) five inch HVAR rockets or 200 x 4 kg (8.8 lb) 68mm rockets located in a retractable armament bay in the lower fuselage or 4 X Matra T-10 rockets carried underwing
- Bombs: 4 x 250 kg (550 lb) or 2 x 340 kg (750 lb)

== See also ==
Related development

- Sud-Est SE.2400

Aircraft of comparable role, configuration, and era

- Blackburn Buccaneer
- English Electric Canberra
- Martin XB-51
- Sud-Ouest S.O.4000
- Sud Aviation Vautour
