= SNCAC Chardonneret =

Chardonneret

General information
- Type: Three/four seat cabin monoplane
- National origin: France
- Manufacturer: SNCAC
- Number built: 3

History
- First flight: 3 November 1946

The SNCAC Chardonneret (sometimes known as the Aérocentre Chardonneret) was a small family of 1940s French three- and four-seat cabin monoplanes with the same wings and general layout but with different engines.

== Design and development ==
The name Chardonneret (English: Goldfinch) was applied to the three completed examples of the first post-war designs from the Société Nationale de Constructions Aéronautiques du Centre (SNCAC) company at Bourges. The NC.832, NC.840 and NC.841 trio differed chiefly in their engines and the number of people they could hold. The Chardonnerets were all high-wing, braced cabin monoplanes. The NC.832 was powered by a 100 hp (75 kW) four cylinder inline inverted air-cooled Régnier 4E.O engine and carried three. It had a tail wheel undercarriage and first flew on 3 November 1946. The other two were both four-seaters. The NC.840 had a 140 hp (104 kW) Renault 4Pei engine of similar configuration to the Régnier and a tricycle wheel undercarriage. The NC.841 had a 175 hp (130 kW) Mathis 175H radial engine and a tail wheel undercarriage. Although the aircraft did not sell, the experience was used in the tail wheel landing gear NC.850.

== Variants ==
Date from:Gaillard (1990), p. 49

NC.832

Régnier 4E.O powered, three seat, tail wheel undercarriage, one built.

NC.840

Renault 4Pei powered, four seat, tricycle undercarriage, one built.

NC.841

Mathis 175H powered, four seat, tail wheel undercarriage, one built.

== Specifications (NC.840) ==
Data from Gailliard (1990), p.49

General characteristics

- Crew: 1 (pilot)
- Capacity: 3 passengers
- Length: 7.56 m (24 ft 10 in)
- Wingspan: 11.20 m (36 ft 9 in)
- Wing area: 19.0 m^{2} (205 sq ft)
- Aspect ratio: 6.6:1
- Empty weight: 608 kg (1,340 lb)
- Gross weight: 1,025 kg (2,260 lb)
- Powerplant: 1 × Renault 4Pei , 100 kW (140 hp)

Performance

- Maximum speed: 220 km/h (140 mph, 120 kn)
- Cruise speed: 190 km/h (120 mph, 100 kn)
- Range: 700 km (430 mi, 380 nmi)
