= SNCASE SE.580 =

Prototype fighter aircraft

General information
- Type: Fighter
- National origin: France
- Manufacturer: SNCASE
- Status: Cancelled
- Number built: 1 (Incomplete)

The SNCASE SE.580 was a prototype fighter designed during World War II by the French aircraft company SNCASE (Société nationale des constructions aéronautiques du Sud-Est). Loosely based on the pre-war Dewoitine D.520, it was intended to be powered by a Hispano-Suiza 24Z piston engine. Production began on a single prototype, but the program was cancelled before it was completed.

== History ==
In 1940, SNCAM began studies of a new fighter aircraft, based on the pre-war Dewoitine D.520, designated M.580. Originally, the power plant was two Hispano-Suiza 12Z engines coupled in tandem and driving a coaxial contra-rotating propeller (similar to the Arsenal VB 10). Before much design work was completed, SNCAM was absorbed into SNCASE (often referred to as Sud-Est) in late 1940, with the aircraft being redesignated SE.580.

== Specifications (Planned; 1943 version) ==
Data from Du M.580 au S.E.582; Sud-Est (SNCASE) SE 580 Fighter

General characteristics

- Crew: 1
- Length: 13 m (42 ft 8 in)
- Wingspan: 15.862 m (52 ft 0 in)
- Wing area: 28.4 m^{2} (306 sq ft)
- Empty weight: 5,143 kg (11,338 lb)
- Gross weight: 7,524 kg (16,588 lb)
- Max takeoff weight: 8,128 kg (17,919 lb)
- Fuel capacity: 2,500 L (550 imp gal; 660 U.S. gal)
- Powerplant: 1 × Hispano-Suiza 24Z 24-cylinder liquid-cooled H engine, 2,700 kW (3,600 hp)
- Propellers: 6-bladed contra-rotating propeller, 3.5 m (11 ft 6 in) diameter

Performance

- Maximum speed: 749 km/h (465 mph, 404 kn) at 9,300 m (30,500 ft)
- Combat range: 1,300 km (810 mi, 700 nmi) at 6,000 m (19,700 ft)
- Ferry range: 2,750 km (1,710 mi, 1,480 nmi) at 8,000 m (26,200 ft)
- Service ceiling: 13,600 m (44,600 ft)
- Rate of climb: 16.66 m/s (3,280 ft/min)
- Time to altitude: 6 minutes, 3 seconds to 6,000 m (19,700 ft)

Armament

- Guns: (Planned)
  - 1943:
    - 1 × 30 mm (1.2 in) HS.825 autocannon (20 rounds) in the engine hub
    - 2 × 20 mm (0.8 in) HS.404 autocannons (150 rounds/gun) in each wing
    - 4 × 7.5 mm MAC 39 machine guns (500 rounds/gun) in each wing
  - 1946:
    - 1 × 30 mm (1.2 in) HS.825 autocannon (20 rounds) in the engine hub
    - 2 × 20 mm (0.8 in) HS.404 autocannons (150 rounds/gun) in each wing
    - 3 × 12.7 mm AN/M2 machine guns (400 rounds/gun) in each wing
- Bombs: 1 × 500 kg (1,102 lb) under each wing

== See also ==
Aircraft of comparable role, configuration, and era

- Hawker Tempest
- Martin-Baker MB 3
- Vultee XP-54

Related lists

- List of fighter aircraft
