= SNCAC =

Former French aircraft manufacturer

Société Nationale des Constructions Aéronautiques du Centre
- Industry: Aerospace, defence
- Predecessor: Farman; Hanriot
- Founded: 1936
- Defunct: 1949
- Fate: Acquired (nationalization)
- Successor: liquidated
- Headquarters: France
- Products: Aircraft

SNCAC (the Société Nationale de Constructions Aéronautiques du Centre, sometimes known as Aérocentre) was a French aircraft manufacturer. SNCAC was created by the nationalisation of the Farman Aviation Works and Hanriot firms in 1936.

The company had a manufacturing facility in Boulogne-Billancourt which was damaged by Allied bombing on 3 March 1942.

It was liquidated in 1949, with assets distributed between SNCAN, SNCASO, and SNECMA, all of which were nationalised firms.

== Aircraft ==
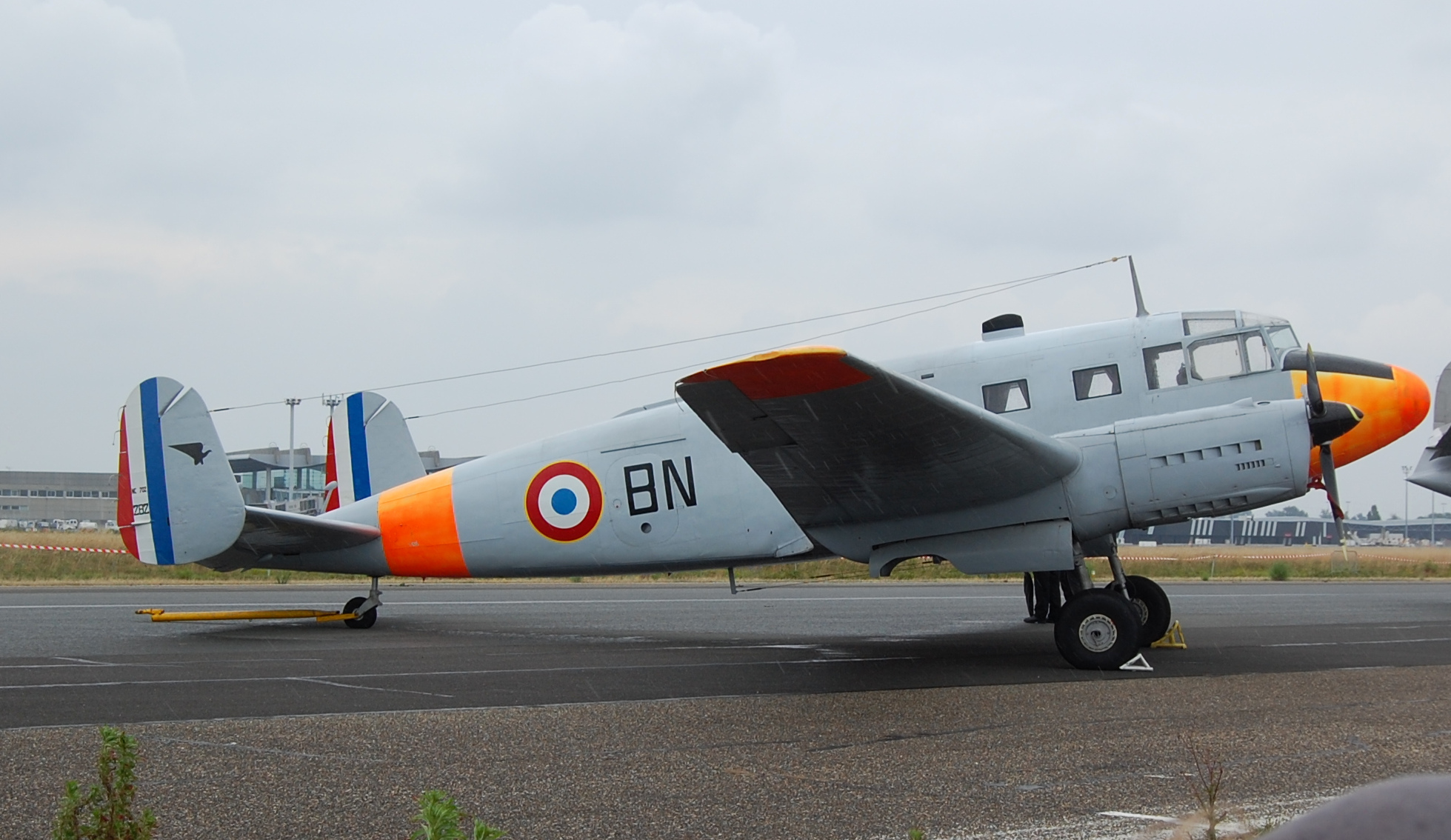
SNCAC NC 702 Martinet

- SNCAC NC.130
- SNCAC NC.150
- SNCAC NC 211 Cormoran
- SNCAC NC.270
- SNCAC NC-290 - abandoned project for a four-engined (Nene-powered) jet transport for 60 passengers.
- SNCAC NC.420
- Farman NC.470
- SNCAC NC.510
- SNCAC NC.530
- SNCAC NC-600
- SNCAC NC.701 Martinet
- SNCAC NC.702 Martinet
- SNCAC NC.800 Cab - abandoned project for a light twin-engined transport
- NC.832 Chardonneret
- NC.840 Chardonneret
- NC.841 Chardonneret
- SNCAC NC.851
- SNCAC NC.853
- SNCAC NC.854
- SNCAC NC.855
- SNCAC NC.856
- SNCAC NC.900
- SNCAC NC.1070
- SNCAC NC.1071
- SNCAC NC 1080
- SNCAC NC.2001 Abeille
- SNCAC NC.3021 Belphégor
