= Potez 8D =

1940s French piston aircraft engine

- Type: Eight cylinder air-cooled inverted V piston engine
- National origin: France
- Manufacturer: Société de Avions et Moteurs Henry Potez

The Potez 8D is the largest member of the Potez D series of air-cooled piston aircraft engines which share several common features. It is a supercharged inverted V8 engine with a take-off power of 373 kW (500 hp).

== Design and development ==
In the 1930s Potez planned a series of new engines to replace their Anzani-derived radial engines. The Potez 4D, a four-cylinder inverted inline engine ran before World War II but did not reach production until the late 1940s, when it was joined by another inverted inline, the six-cylinder Potez 6D, and the eight-cylinder inverted-V 8D. The D-series engines had much in common, most obviously sharing pistons and cylinders, with the same stroke, bore and valve gear. The larger 8D required an enhanced though similar lubrication system and different connecting rods because of its 90° V layout.

A 8D.32 powered the first prototype of the Potez 75 ground attack aircraft but budget cuts in 1957 led to the cancellation of an order for 15 pre-series and 100 series machines.

== Variants ==
8D-00
8D-10
8D-20
8D-30
Tractor configuration
8D-32
Pusher configuration, with stepped up engine driven cooling fan.
8D-40

== Applications ==
- Potez 75

== Specifications ==
Data from Jane's All the World's aircraft 1956-57 pp.431-2

=== General characteristics ===
- Type: 90° V8 air-cooled inverted piston engine, supercharged and geared down.
- Bore: 125 mm (4.92 in)
- Stroke: 120 mm (4.72 in)
- Displacement: 11.78 L (719 cu in)
- Length: 1,620 mm (63.78 in)
- Width: 795 mm (31.30 in)
- Height: 803 mm (31.61 in)
- Dry weight: (8D-30) 335 kg (739 lb) without accessories. Cooling fan of 8D-32 adds 20 kg (44 lb).

=== Components ===
- Valvetrain: Two valves/cylinder; exhaust valve sodium cooled. Valves operated from camshaft in overhead crankcase vis push-rods, roller tappets and rocker arms.
- Supercharger: Single speed, single stage centrifugal type, running at 9.83 times engine speed.
- Fuel system: One Zenith 95 RGSL carburettors with auto altitude correction. Dual magnetos, two plugs/cylinder.
- Fuel type: 100 Octane minimum
- Oil system: Dry sump; two pressure and three scavenging pumps.
- Cooling system: Air.
- Reduction gear: 0.657:1, planetary gear
- Pistons, connecting rods and crankshaft: Y-alloy pistons with two compression and two scraper rings. Fork and blade type nitrided Ni-Cr-Mo steel connecting rods, with split big-ends and lead -bronze bearings. Four throw, forged nitrided Ni-Cr-Mo steel balanced crankshaft, its rear end driving the supercharger via flexible drive. Five lead-bronze plated bearings. Cast aluminium-alloy crankcase.

=== Performance ===
- Power output: Normal at 1,900 m (6,200 ft), 321 kW (430 hp) at 2,500 rpm; take-off, 373 kW (500 hp) at 2,530 rpm.
- Compression ratio: 7:1
- Fuel consumption: At economical cruising (216 kW (290 hp)), 62.4 kg (137.6 lb)/hour.
