= Nord NC.850 =

1940s French light aircraft

NC.850
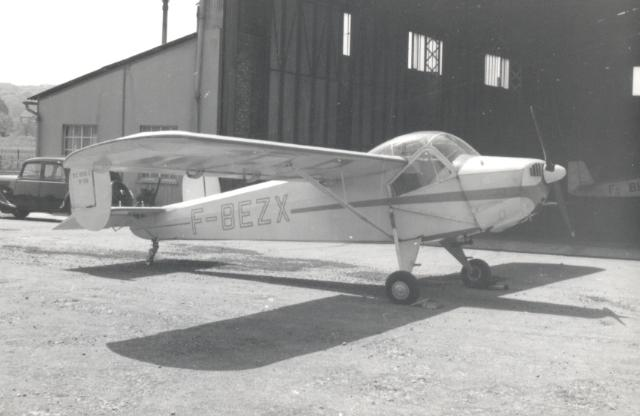
- Nord NC.858S at St Cyr l'Ecole airfield, near Paris, in May 1957

General information
- Type: Civil utility aircraft
- National origin: France
- Manufacturer: SNCAC, SNCAN
- Status: still in service
- Primary user: private owners and aero clubs

History
- First flight: April 1947

The Nord NC.850 (originally produced as the Aérocentre NC.850) was a light aircraft developed in France in the late 1940s for use by French aeroclubs, but which also saw military use as an airborne observation post.

== Development ==
The NC.850 series was developed from the Aérocentre NC.840 in response to a competition sponsored by the French government under the auspices of the SALS movement to find a domestically produced machine for club use. Aérocentre's entry was an ungainly high-wing, strut-braced monoplane with a fully enclosed cabin and fixed, tailwheel undercarriage. The fuselage construction was tubular, and the wings had a metal structure, the entire aircraft being skinned in fabric.

The competition was won by the SIPA S.90, but SALS nevertheless also ordered 100 examples of this, the runner-up design. These production examples, designated NC.853, differed from the prototypes in having twin tails, the fins mounted on the ends of the horizontal stabiliser. Only 27 of the order had been completed, however, when Aérocentre was liquidated and its assets bought by Nord. The new owners continued production, with their machines identified with designation NC.853S.

== Military version ==
In March 1951, Nord flew a heavily modified version of the design for use as an observation aircraft by the French Army. Known as the NC.856 Norvigie, this featured a more powerful engine and a lengthened and more extensively glazed cockpit. The army ordered 112 examples which were mostly flown in the artillery spotting role, and while a civil version was also offered, orders were not forthcoming and only two were built. The sole example of a floatplane version was presented as a gift to King Norodom Sihanouk of Cambodia.

== Variants ==
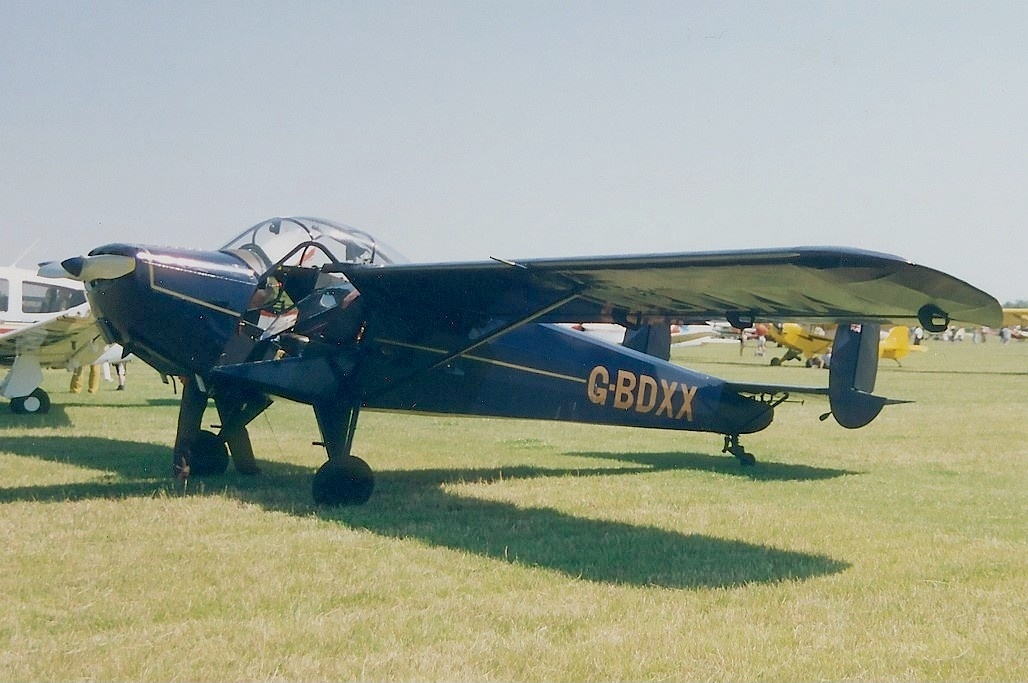
Nord NC.858S

- NC.850 - prototype with single tail and Mathis G4F engine (one built)
- NC.851 - version with Minié 4.DA.28 engine (nine built)
- NC.852 - version with Regnier 4EO engine (two built)
- NC.853 - major production version with twin tails and Minié 4.DC.32 engine (29 built)
  - NC.853S - NC.853 built by Nord (95 built)
  - NC.853G - NC.853 fitted with aile flottante system (one converted)
- NC.854 - NC.853 with Continental A65 engine (two built, plus many converted from NC.853)
  - NC.854SA - militarised NC.854 (two built)
- NC.856 - NC.853 with Walter Minor engine (one built)
  - NC.856A - military production version with redesigned cockpit, extensive glazing, and Regnier 4LO-4 engine (112 built)
  - NC.856B - four-seat version of NC.856 (one built)
  - NC.856H - floatplane version of NC.856 with triple tail (one built)
  - NC.856N - four-seat, civil version of NC.856A with Regnier 4LO-8 (two built)
- NC.858S - conversions of NC.853 with Continental C90 engine
- NC.859S - glider tug version of NC.853 with Walter Minor engine (nine built)

== Operators ==
France

- Private owners and Aero clubs
- Aviation légère de l'armée de terre

== Specifications (NC.856A) ==
Data from

General characteristics

- Crew: two
- Length: 7.3 m (24 ft 0 in)
- Wingspan: 12.2 m (40 ft 0 in)
- Height: 2.1 m (7 ft 0 in)
- Wing area: 17.0 m^{2} (183 sq ft)
- Empty weight: 651 kg (1,432 lb)
- Gross weight: 902 kg (1,984 lb)
- Powerplant: 1 × Regnier 4L.O4 four cylinder air cooled inverted inline engine , 104 kW (140 hp)

Performance

- Maximum speed: 189 km/h (118 mph, 103 kn)
- Cruise speed: 170 km/h (106 mph, 92 kn)
- Stall speed: 70 km/h (43.5 mph, 37.8 kn)
- Endurance: 3 hours
- Rate of climb: 5.0 m/s (984 ft/min)
