= SNCASE SE.100 =

French prototype of heavy fighter

Sud-Est SE.100
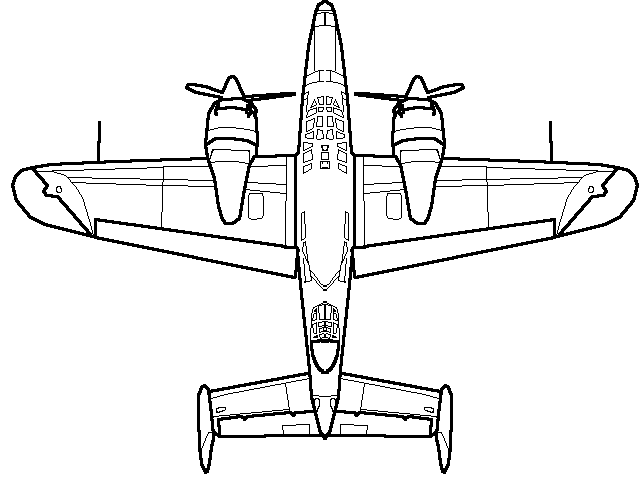
- Upper view

General information
- Type: Fighter
- National origin: France
- Manufacturer: Lioré et Olivier; SNCASE
- Designer: Pierre Mercier and Jacques Lecarme
- Primary user: French Air Force (planned)
- Number built: 1

History
- Introduction date: Late 1940 (planned)
- First flight: 29 March 1939

The SNCASE SE.100 was a French two-seat, twin-engined fighter that first flew in 1939. Mass production was planned to begin late in 1940 but the Fall of France prevented this.

== Design and development ==
The origins of the SE.100 predate the creation of the SNCASE (Sud-Est) company in the nationalisations of 1937. It was designed by Pierre Mercier and Jacques Lecarme at Lioré et Olivier and was initially designated the LeO 50. Underpowered by two Gnome-Rhône 14M engines, the design was recast to use the more powerful Gnome-Rhône 14N-20 and -21 engines, the same used in the Lioré et Olivier LeO 451 bomber, and renamed the SE.100. The aircraft was of conventional all-metal construction, having a mid-wing layout. As with most French twin-engined aircraft of the era, the engines were handed, one airscrew rotating clockwise and the other anti-clockwise, to minimise torque. The aircraft had a twin tail. In production models it was planned to redesign the wing to use components from the LeO 451 wing to ease production. The fuselage was short in appearance, with a long nose and a very short tail, the cockpit being connected to the gunner's position aft by a windowed corridor. The undercarriage was very unconventional, a taildragger with single main wheel at the front and one rear wheel fitted under each vertical tail and retracting into them, rather than two main wheels under the wings or engine nacelles and a single tail wheel as per usual practice. The aircraft was fitted with four Hispano-Suiza HS.404 20 mm cannon in the nose and one in the gunner's post.

The first prototype of the SE.100 flew on 29 March 1939 at Argenteuil, and a number of necessary changes were identified during the tests. It was destroyed in a crash on 5 April 1940. The aircraft proved to be around 100 km/h faster than the Potez 631, the French Air Force's current twin-engined fighter, and production was authorised.

While the tests were proceeding, a second prototype was being built, incorporating the changes, the most obvious of which was the removal of the windowed corridor in the fuselage and its replacement by additional fuel tanks. The armament was increased to six cannon in the nose, two in the gunner's post and one additional cannon in the floor of the gunner's post. As the second prototype was being built, the Citroën company was preparing to mass-produce the aircraft at their Paris works, deliveries planned to begin late in 1940.

At least two paper variants were studied, the SE.101 powered by Pratt & Whitney R-1830 Twin Wasp engines, and the SE.102 powered by a different version of the Gnome-Rhône 14N. The SE.500 and SE.800 were to have been a 12-passenger transport and a four-engined transport, respectively, derived from the SE.100.

== Specifications (SE.100) ==
Data from L'Aviation française de 1939 à 1942, War Planes of the Second World War; Volume One; Fighters

General characteristics

- Crew: 2
- Length: 11.8 m (38 ft 9 in)
- Wingspan: 15.7 m (51 ft 6 in)
- Height: 4.28 m (14 ft 1 in)
- Wing area: 33 m^{2} (360 sq ft)
- Aspect ratio: 7.47
- Gross weight: 7,500 kg (16,535 lb)
- Powerplant: 2 × Gnome-Rhône 14N-20/21 14-cylinder air-cooled radial piston engine, 806 kW (1,081 hp) each

Performance

- Maximum speed: 580 km/h (360 mph, 310 kn) at 6,500 m (21,300 ft)
- Cruise speed: 499 km/h (310 mph, 269 kn)
- Range: 1,300 km (810 mi, 700 nmi)
- Wing loading: 227 kg/m^{2} (46 lb/sq ft)
- Power/mass: 0.21kW/kg (0.13hp/lb)

Armament

- Guns:

Prototype

- 4 x 20 mm Hispano-Suiza HS.404 cannon in nose
- 1 x 20 mm Hispano-Suiza HS.404 cannon in rear gunner's post

Planned production version

- 6 x 20 mm cannon in the nose
- 2 x 20 mm cannon in a rear turret
- 2 x 20 mm cannon in the belly

== Bibliography ==
- Hartmann, Gérard. Les avions Lioré et Olivier. Boulogne-Billancourt, France: ETAI. 2002. ISBN 2-7268-8607-8 (in French)
- Pelletier, Alain J. (January–February 1999). "French 'Warthog': SE. 100, Cannon-armed 'Penetration' Fighter". Air Enthusiast (79): 16–20. ISSN 0143-5450.
- Ricco, Philippe (2005). SNCASE SE 100: chasseur lourd polyvalent. Avia éd. ISBN 978-2915030167.
- Stroud, Nick (2015). "Rum Punch: The Unorthodox SNCASE SE.100". The Aviation Historian (13): 100–109. ISSN 2051-1930.
