= Paris-Saclay-Versailles Airport =

Paris Saclay Versailles Airport Advanced Landing Ground (ALG) A-46
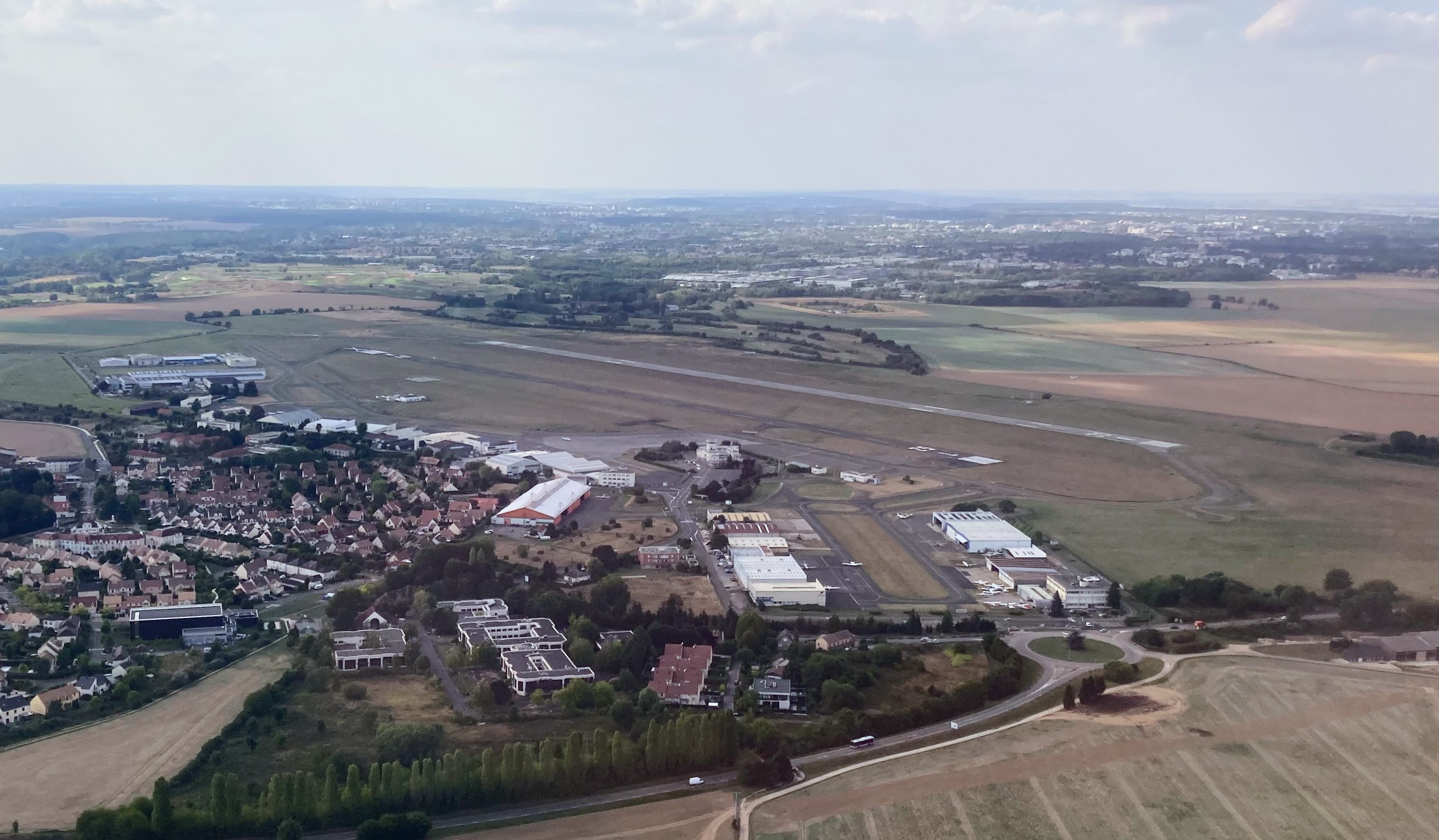
- Toussus le Noble airport seen from above
- IATA: TNF; ICAO: LFPN

Summary
- Location: Toussus-le-Noble, France
- Elevation AMSL: 538 ft / 164 m
- Coordinates: 48°45′05″N 002°06′22″E

Map
- Location of Toussus-le-Noble Airport

Runways
Direction	Length		Surface
Direction	ft	m	Surface
07R/25L	3,445	1,050	Asphalt
07L/25R	3,609	1,100	Asphalt

Paris-Saclay-Versailles Airport (formerly Toussus-le-Noble Airport) is a regional airport in France (IATA: TNF, ICAO: LFPN) located in the town of Toussus-le-Noble, in Yvelines. It supports general aviation with no commercial airline service scheduled. French governmental aircraft are stored and maintained at the airport. It is one of the most active airfields for general aviation in France.

== History ==
The airport is one of the oldest in France, being established in 1907. It was used by the French Air Force during World War I and also during the early part (1939–1940) of World War II.

The airfield was seized by the Germans in June 1940 during the Battle of France, and was used by Sturzkampfgeschwader 77 (SKG 77), a Luftwaffe dive bombing wing, during the Battle of Britain flying Junkers Ju 87 "Stukas" and later Dornier Do 17 light bombers between December 1940 and March 1941. When SKG 77 moved out, the airfield was not actively used, but remained an auxiliary dispersal airfield for several units, but not having any active units or aircraft assigned.

in 1944, during the Northern France Campaign, the airfield was liberated by Allied ground forces about 28 August. The United States Army Air Force IX Engineering Command 818th Engineer Aviation Battalion cleared the airport of mines and destroyed Luftwaffe aircraft. In addition, a 4000' all-weather temporary square-mesh track (SMT) runway was overlaid over the existing turf runway, aligned 07/25. About 30 August, two days after its liberation, Toussus-le-Noble became a USAAF Ninth Air Force combat airfield, designated as Advanced Landing Ground A-46.

Under American control, the Ninth Air Force assigned the 67th Tactical Reconnaissance Group to the airport which flew a variety of photo-reconnaissance aircraft until the end of September 1944. The combat unit then moved east along with the Allied lines and the airport became a resupply and casualty evacuation airfield, as well as liaison aircraft assigned to Allied headquarters in Paris. The Americans returned full control of the airport to French authorities on 8 August 1945.

On 2 January 1945, Admiral Bertram Ramsay was killed when his plane crashed on takeoff at Toussus-le-Noble Airport. He was en route to a conference with Field Marshal Montgomery in Brussels.

After the war, the military parking apron, temporary buildings, along with various aircraft wreckage were removed. The temporary SMT runway was made permanent and resurfaced (07R/25L), and a second runway (07L/25R) along with expanding ground facilities was constructed.

On February 16th 2024, France Transport minister published the notification of the name change from "Toussus-le-Noble" to "aérodrome de Paris - Saclay - Versailles"

== Facilities ==
The airport hosts 1 control tower, 1 fuel provider, 1 terminal and 40 hangars. It has a surface area of 166 hectares, and has 2 runways:

Runway 07L/25R - Asphalt - 1,100m x 30m

Runway 07R/25L - Asphalt - 1,050m x 30m

== Airlines and destinations ==
As of 17 March 2023, there are no regular passenger flights at Toussus-le-Noble.

== See also ==
- Advanced Landing Ground
- List of airports in France
