= SNCAN =

Société nationale des constructions aéronautiques du Nord
- Industry: Aerospace, defence
- Predecessor: Potez (Méaulte); C.A.M.S. (Sartrouville); ANF (Les Mureaux); Amiot (Caudebec-en-Caux); Breguet (Le Havre)
- Founded: 1936
- Defunct: 1954
- Fate: Acquired (nationalization)
- Successor: Nord Aviation
- Headquarters: France
- Products: Aircraft

SNCAN, (abbreviated from Société nationale des constructions aéronautiques du Nord), or commonly, Nord, was a state-owned French aircraft manufacturer in the pre- and post–World War II era. The company had been formed as one of six state-owned Société Nationales in the 1936 reorganization of military industries, and was created by the nationalization of several aircraft factories in the north of France. It survived until 1954 when it merged to form Nord Aviation.

== History ==
Following the resolution of the 1936 general strike of French heavy industry the government of Léon Blum introduced an act to nationalize the French war industry on or before April 1, 1937. This led to the formation of six nationalized aircraft manufacturing companies, organized regionally: SNCAN (in the north), SNCAO (west), SNCAM (Le Midi), SNCAC (centre), SNCASO (the south-west), and SNCASE (south-east). A further company, SNCM, (previously Lorraine-Dietrich), was created for building aircraft engines.

SNCAN was a merger of the Potez factory at Méaulte in Picardy, CAMS in Sartrouville, ANF Les Mureaux in the Ile-de-France, Amiot/SECM Caudebec-en-Caux, and Breguet Le Havre in Normandy.

In the run-up to the Second World War, SNCAN continued to build aircraft to established designs of the original makers. It also produced several new designs and prototypes, although only one, the Potez 63 series, went into full production.

After the fall of France in 1940, SNCAN's assets lay in the occupied zone, and work in the aircraft industry was restricted, although in 1944 the company was able to build a German sport and touring aircraft, the Me 108, under licence; after the end of the war this was continued as the Nord Pingouin.

During this period, SNCAN adopted the "Nord" marque name and generated a series of successful designs, the best-known of which was the Nord Noratlas transport aircraft.

In 1949 the SNCAC group was dissolved and several of its assets were absorbed by SNCAN; however a further period of rationalization saw SNCAN merge with SFECMAS, the recently privatized French government Air Arsenal, and renamed “Nord Aviation”,

Later, in 1970, Nord merged with Sud Aviation to form Aerospatiale, the French government's primary aircraft manufacturer.

== Products ==
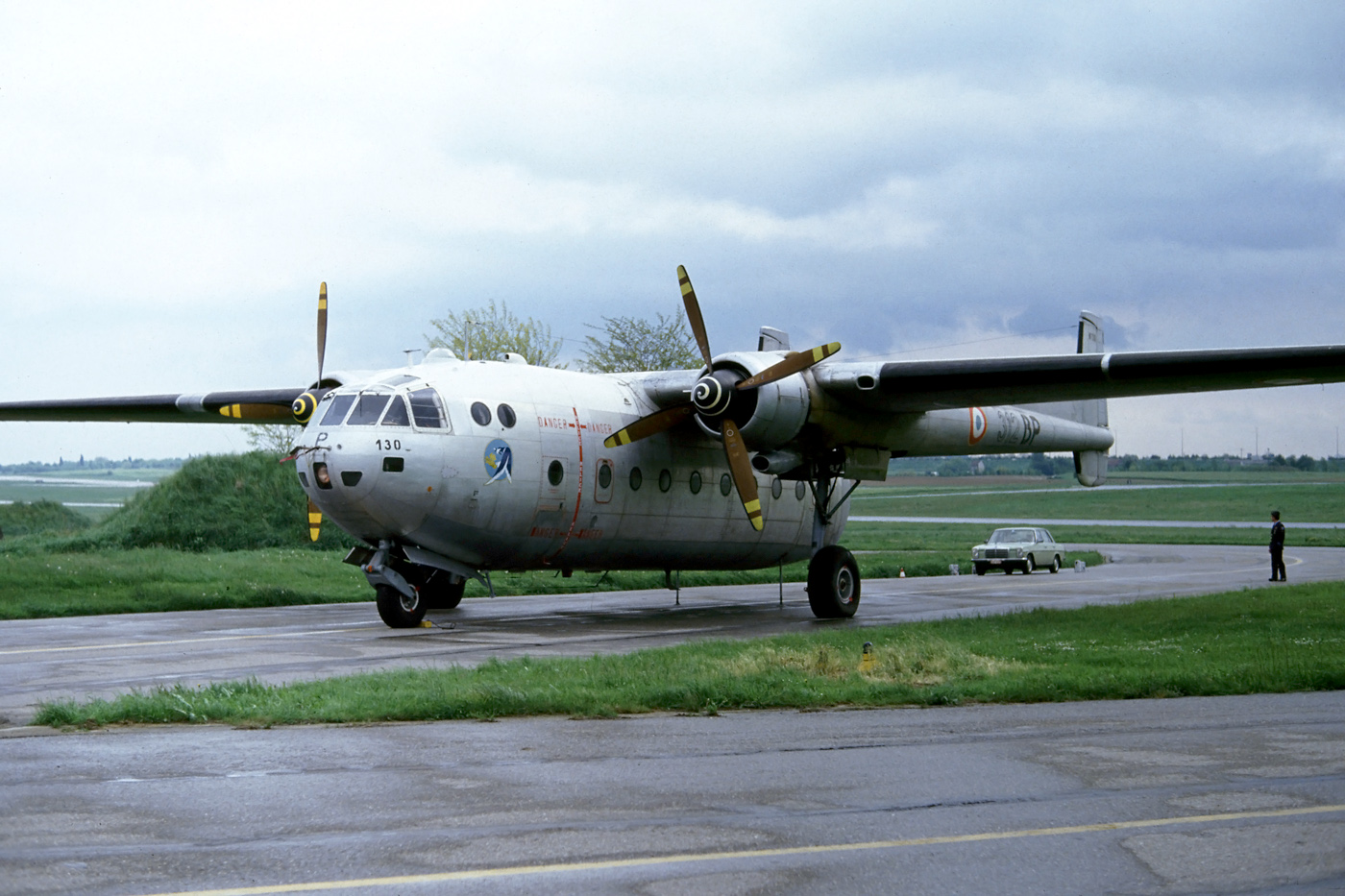
Nord Noratlas in 1983

Aircraft designed and built by SNCAN include the Pingouin, in 1944; the Norécrin, a 3-seat cabin monoplane trainer, in 1945: the Norélan, a 3-seat trainer, in 1948: and the Noroit, a 2-engine air-sea rescue amphibian/flying-boat, in 1949

In 1947 Nord built a prototype carrier bomber, the Noréclair, and a prototype 2-seat helicopter, the Norélic, but neither went into production.

In 1947 Nord also designed the Norazur, a prototype 2-engine transport plane, and followed it with the Noratlas in 1949, which became the main transport aircraft of the French Air Force of the era.

Nord unveiled the Inter Autoscooter at the 1953 Paris Motor Show. They were produced from 1954-1958.
