= ARSAERO CT 10 =

French pulsejet target drone

CT 10
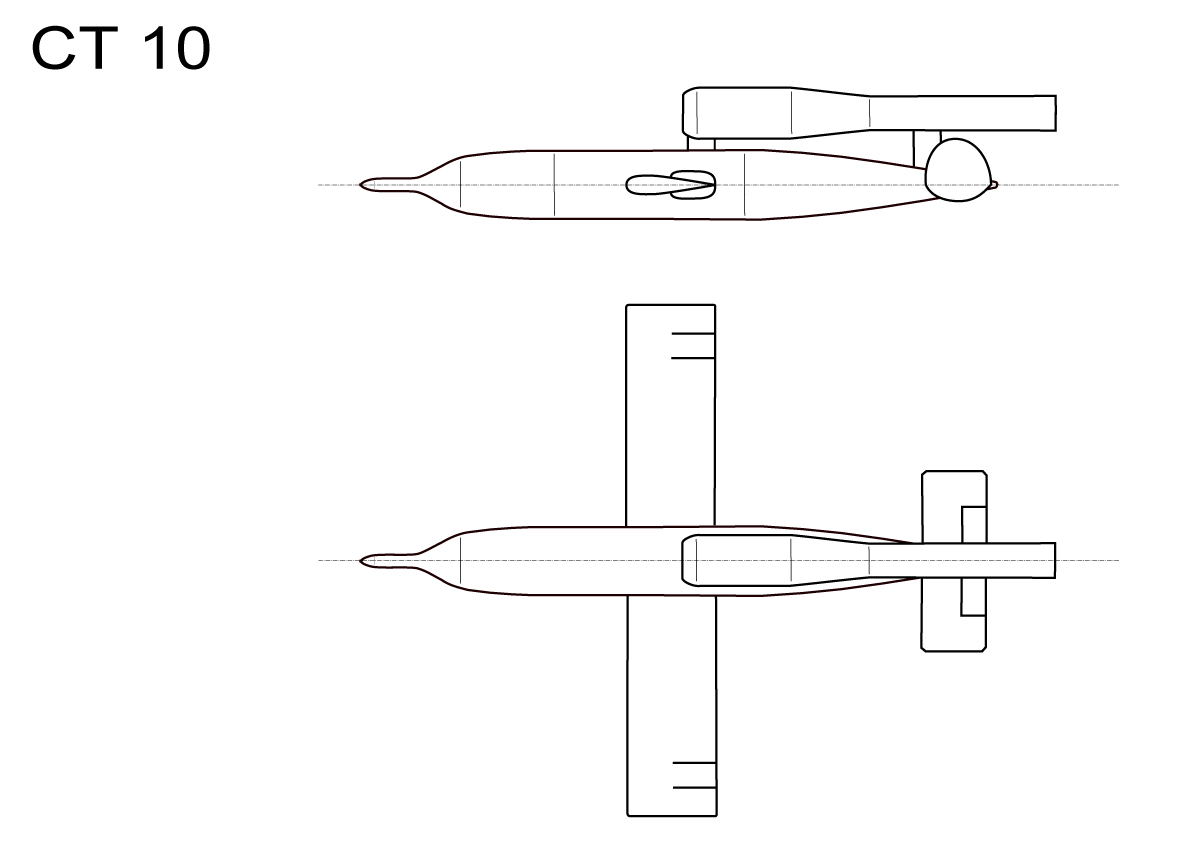
- Type: Target drone
- Place of origin: France

Service history
- In service: 1951–1960s
- Used by: French Air Force; Royal Air Force; Italian Air Force; Swedish Air Force

Specifications
- Wingspan: 4.35 metres (14.3 ft)
- Engine: pulsejet, two solid rockets
- Operational range: 30 minutes
- Flight ceiling: 4,000 metres (13,000 ft)
- Maximum speed: 420 kilometres per hour (260 mph)
- Guidance system: Radio-guided
- Launch platform: Launch ramp

The ARSAERO CT 10, also known as the Arsenal/SFECMAS Ars 5501, was a remote-controlled target drone developed by the Arsenal de l'Aéronautique (ARSAERO) for the French Air Force. It was developed as a copy of the German V-1 flying bomb and was used to simulate bombers for training anti-aircraft artillery crews and fighter pilots.

== History ==
The CT 10's design process began in August 1946 with reverse-engineering of V-1 missile stocks captured from the Luftwaffe. It was first launched from the Centre interarmées d'essais d'engins spéciaux missile range near Colomb-Bechar, Algeria, in December 1949 and became operational in 1952. It was mass-produced by Nord in Châtillon and Villeurbanne. More than 400 copies were eventually built. The CT 10 was used primarily by France, though the United Kingdom, Italy, and Sweden used it as well. It was retired from French service during the 1950s in favour of more advanced derivatives such as the CT20 and CT41 but was still in widespread use by the British and Swedish air forces throughout the 1960s.

== Design ==
The CT 10 was ground-launched or air-launched. When ground-launched, it would be propelled down a launch ramp by a pair of solid rockets. When air-launched, it would be released from a LeO 45 bomber. It was then engaged by fighter aircraft or ground-based guns and missiles.

The CT 10's design is largely identical to that of the V-1 missile it was based on. However, there were some important differences between the two:

- The CT 10 was scaled-down from the V-1: it is 6 m long, versus 8.32 m for the V-1.
- The CT 10 was propelled down its launch ramp by a pair of solid rocket boosters, which had more thrust than the liquid-fueled Dampferzeuger ("Steam generator") used to launch the V-1. This allowed the CT 10's launch ramp to be considerably shorter.
- The CT 10 was designed to be recovered, and therefore carried a parachute.
- The CT 10 was radio-guided from a nearby ground station.

== Surviving examples ==
A CT 10 is displayed in the Overlord Museum in Colleville-sur-Mer, France.

== Operators ==
France
Italy
Sweden
United Kingdom

- Royal Navy

== Specifications ==
Data from Jane's All the World's Aircraft 1956–57

General characteristics

- Length: 6.014 m (19 ft 9 in)
- Wingspan: 4.30 m (14 ft 1 in)
- Height: 1.092 m (3 ft 7 in)
- Gross weight: 660 kg (1,455 lb)
- Powerplant: 1 × Arsenal pulse jet, 1.72 kN (386 lbf) thrust

Performance

- Maximum speed: 460 km/h (290 mph, 250 kn) at 4,000 m (13,000 ft)
- Range: 320 km (200 mi, 170 nmi)
- Time to altitude: 10 min to 4,000 ft (1,200 m)

== See also ==
Related development

- V-1 Flying Bomb
- Nord CT20
- Nord CT41

Aircraft of comparable role, configuration, and era

- Ryan Firebee
- McDonnell TD2D Katydid
- Globe KD5G
