= Nord 1601 =

1950s French research aircraft

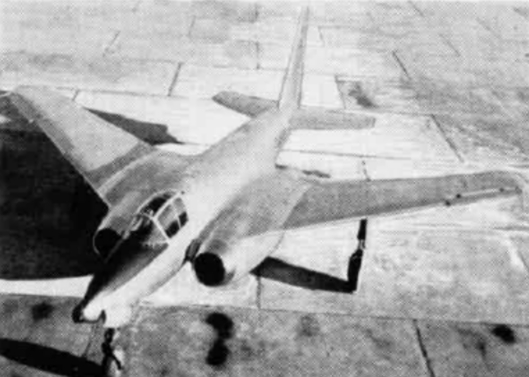

General information
- Type: Aerodynamic research aircraft
- National origin: France
- Manufacturer: SNCAN, Nord Aviation
- Number built: 1

History
- First flight: 24 January 1950

The Nord 1601 was a French aerodynamic research aircraft designed and built by Nord Aviation. The aircraft was designed to investigate the aerodynamics of swept wings and related high-lift devices.

== Design and development ==
The 1601 was a cantilever mid-wing monoplane with a 33° swept wing. The wing was fitted with ailerons, spoilers, leading edge slats and trailing edge flaps. It had retractable tricycle landing gear and was powered by two Rolls-Royce Derwent V turbojets in underslung, wing mounted nacelles on either side of the fuselage. It had an enclosed cockpit and was fitted with a Martin-Baker ejection seat. The 1601, registered F-WFKK, first flew on the 24 January 1950.

== Variants ==
Nord 1600
Proposed fighter variant, not built.
Nord 1601
Aerodynamic research aircraft, one built.

== Specifications (1601) ==
Data from Gaillard (1990) p.110

General characteristics

- Crew: 1
- Length: 11.62 m (38 ft 7 in)
- Wingspan: 12.40 m (40 ft 10.5 in)
- Height: 3.67 m (12 ft 0 in)
- Wing area: 30.2 m^{2} (333 sq ft)
- Empty weight: 4,710 kg (10,384 lb)
- Gross weight: 6,700 kg (14,771 lb)
- Powerplant: 2 × Rolls-Royce Derwent V turbojet , 17.8 kN (4,000 lbf) thrust each

Performance

- Maximum speed: 1,000 km/h (621 mph, 540 kn)
- Range: 1,135 km (705 mi, 613 nmi)
- Service ceiling: 12,000 m (39,370 ft)

== Bibliography ==
- Buttler, Tony & Delezenne, Jean-Louis (2012). X-Planes of Europe: Secret Research Aircraft from the Golden Age 1946-1974. Manchester, UK: Hikoki Publications. ISBN 978-1-902-10921-3.
- Cuny, Jean (1989). Les avions de combat français, 2: Chasse lourde, bombardement, assaut, exploration [French Combat Aircraft 2: Heavy Fighters, Bombers, Attack, Reconnaissance]. Docavia (in French). Vol. 30. Ed. Larivière. OCLC 36836833.
- Gaillard, Pierre (1990). Les Avions Francais de 1944 à 1964 [French Aircraft from 1944 to 1964] (in French). Paris: Éditions EPA. ISBN 2-85120-350-9.
- Taylor, Michael J. H. (1989). Jane's Encyclopedia of Aviation. London: Studio Editions.
- The Illustrated Encyclopedia of Aircraft (Part Work 1982-1985). Orbis Publishing.
