= Nord 2800 =

1950s French training aircraft

2800

General information
- Type: Light trainer
- National origin: France
- Manufacturer: Nord Aviation
- Number built: 1

History
- First flight: 4 August 1950

The Nord 2800 was a 1950s training monoplane designed and built in France by Nord Aviation.

== Development ==
The Nord 2800 was built in response to a French Air Force requirement for a military trainer to seat three people. It was a basic trainer design of all-metal construction that featured a retractable tail wheel type landing gear. Competitors to the Nord 2800 included the Dassault MD-80 ABC and Morane-Saulnier MS.730. The Nord 2800 had two of the crew sitting side-by-side, with the third crewman sitting behind. Flight tests revealed controllability issues, and despite tail and rudder modifications, the Nord 2800 lost out to the MS.730.

== Specifications (variant specified) ==
Data from 1000aircraftphotos : Nord 2800, Aviafrance :S.N.C.A.N. Nord 2800

General characteristics

- Crew: 3
- Length: 8.64 m (28 ft 4 in)
- Wingspan: 12 m (39 ft 4 in)
- Height: 3.52 m (11 ft 7 in)
- Powerplant: 1 × Salmson 8As-00 V-8 inverted air-cooled piston engine, 180 kW (240 hp)
- Propellers: 2-bladed variable-pitch propeller

Performance

- Maximum speed: 265 km/h (165 mph, 143 kn)
- Cruise speed: 235 km/h (146 mph, 127 kn)
