= Nord Norélan =

1940s French trainer aircraft

Norélan
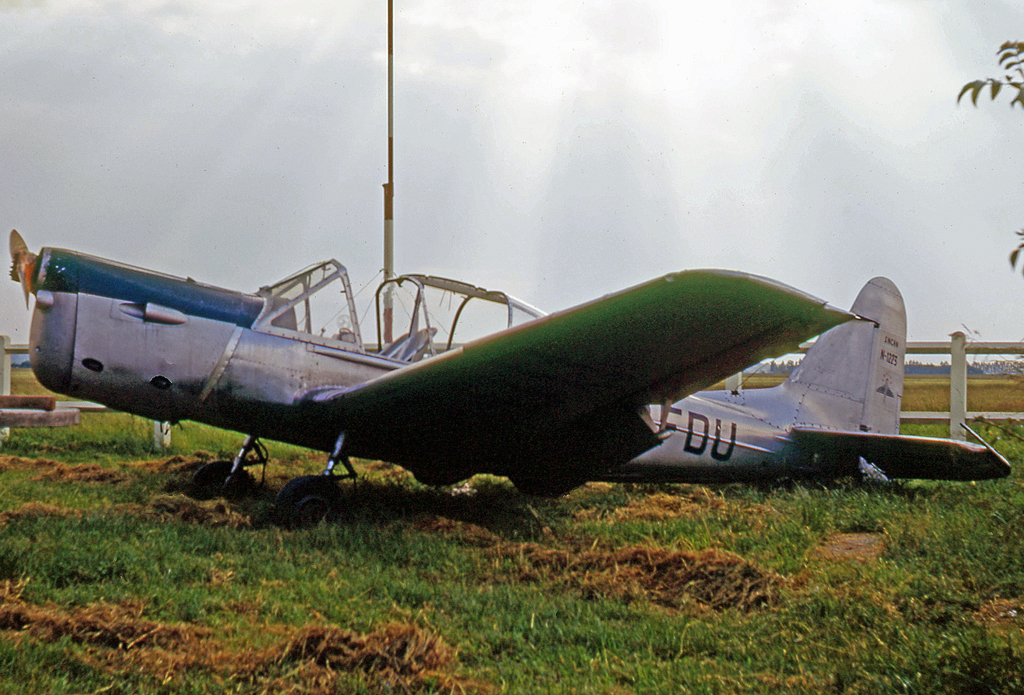
- Nord 1223 Norélan No. 02 F-BFDU at Meaux - Esbly airfield in June 1969

General information
- Type: Three-seat light trainer
- National origin: France
- Manufacturer: Nord Aviation
- Number built: 3

History
- First flight: 1948

The Nord 1221 Norélan was a 1940s three-seat training monoplane designed and built in France by Nord Aviation.

== Design and development ==
Designed as a three-seat trainer and first flown on 30 June 1948 the Norélan was a single-engined low-wing cantilever monoplane with a distinctive large dihedral angle to the wings. Originally to have a retractable tricycle landing gear the design was changed to a fixed tailwheel landing gear. A number of variants with different engines were produced but no production orders were received.

== Variants ==
1221
Prototype with 180hp (134kW) Mathis 8G-20 inverted Vee engine, later converted to 1222.
1222
Prototype re-engined with a 180hp (134kW) Régnier 4L-02 inline engine
1223
Powered by a 240hp (179kW) Argus As 10C inverted Vee engine, one built and prototype re-engined.
1226
Engine-testbed for the 240hp (179kW) Potez 6D-0 inline engine. one built.

== Specifications (1221) ==
General characteristics

- Crew: three
- Length: 7.37 m (24 ft 2 in)
- Wingspan: 10.20 m (33 ft 5 in)
- Height: 2.67 m (8 ft 9 in)
- Wing area: 13.00 m^{2} (140 sq ft)
- Empty weight: 763 kg (1,682 lb)
- Gross weight: 1,115 kg (2,458 lb)
- Powerplant: 1 × Mathis 8G-20 , 134 kW (180 hp)

Performance

- Maximum speed: 245 km/h (153 mph, 133 kn)
- Range: 880 km (550 mi, 480 nmi)
- Service ceiling: 5,000 m (16,400 ft)
