= Inter Autoscooter =

Short-lived 1950s French microcar

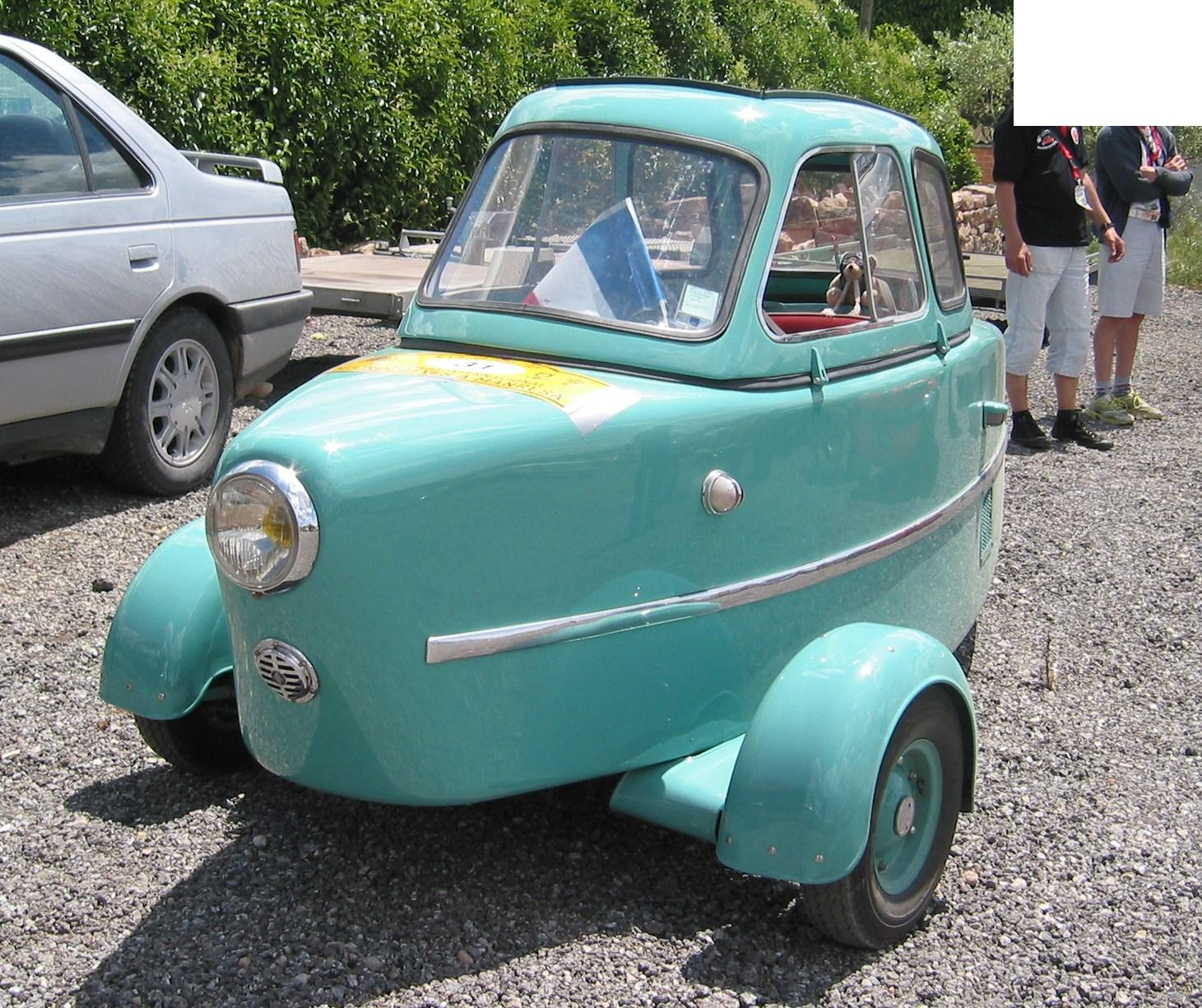
- An Inter Berline

Overview
- Manufacturer: Societé Nationale de Constructions Aéronautiques du Nord (SNCAN)
- Also called: Inter 175A Berline
- Production: 1954-1958
- Assembly: Villeurbanne, Lyon, France
- Designer: SNCAN

Body and chassis
- Class: Microcar
- Body style: Berlinetta, Torpedo
- Related: Messerschmitt KR175

Powertrain
- Engine: Ydral, rear-mounted, 175cc, 1-cylinder
- Transmission: 3-speed manual, rear-wheel drive

The Inter Autoscooter is a discontinued three-wheeled French microcar that debuted at the 1953 Paris Motor Show. Between the two body types, the open-topped Torpedo and the close-topped Berline, only 300 were produced between 1954 and 1958. As of 2017, only 30 are estimated to still exist.

== Design ==
Inters were designed and produced by Societé Nationale de Constructions Aéronautiques du Nord, an aeronautics firm; the avian inspiration for these cars is clear. The Inter has a single windshield wiper and headlight, tandem seats, and a hinged canopy, and its steering is controlled by a yoke. Inters gained a reputation for being unreliable, due in part to the complicated starter system. The car is fitted with a six-volt power supply connected to a motorcycle battery, which powers the Westinghouse gyrostarter. A gyrostarter is a starter seen most frequently on helicopters; it engages the engine by pressing a lever. The fuel tank and engine are also both located in the rear of the car. In addition to its reported unreliability, the Inter has several parts that are unique, making it expensive and difficult to find replacement parts.

The first Inters built had front wheels that could be tucked under the car to more efficiently travel down narrow streets and park in small spaces. This brought the car from a width of 53 inches (130 cm) to 35 inches (89 cm). While in theory this might appear efficient, it was not and the feature was quickly discontinued. Its top speed is 50 miles per hour (80 km/h).
