= AS-30 =

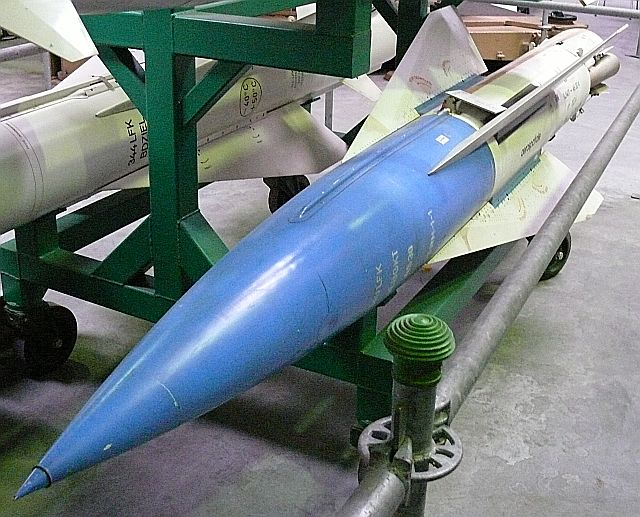
- Early AS.30 radio command guidance
- Type: short-to-medium range air-to-ground missile
- Place of origin: France

Service history
- In service: 1960(AS-30); 1988 (AS-30L)
- Used by: See "Operators" section

Production history
- Manufacturer: Aérospatiale
- Produced: 1960

Specifications
- Mass: 520 kg (1,146 lb)
- Length: 3.84 m (12 ft 7.57 in) for AS-30 3.65m (11 ft 11.7 in) for AS-30L
- Diameter: 340mm (13 in)
- Wingspan: 1 m (3.2 ft)
- Warhead: 240 kg (529 lb) impact-fuzed SAPHE (Semi-Armor-Piercing High-Explosive)
- Detonation mechanism: Delayed AP impact fuse (2 m ferroconcrete)
- Engine: Two-stage solid propellant rocket motors, composite booster, double-based sustainer
- Operational range: 3-11 km (1.8-6.8 mi) for AS-30; 3-12km (1.8-7.4 mi) for AS-30L
- Flight ceiling: 10,000 m (32,800 ft)
- Maximum speed: 1,620 km/h (1,056 mph)
- Guidance system: semi-active laser homing (AS-30L) Radio MCLOS (original AS-30)
- Launch platform: Mirage 2000D, Mirage 2000-5, F-16, Jaguar, Mirage F1, upgraded Super Etendard, Rafale

External images
- AS-30L laser homing air to ground missile
- French Air Force F1 Mirage firing AS-30L
- French Air Force Jaguar test firing AS-30L with laser homing pod located on center-line pylon
- AS-30L test against simulated concrete aircraft bunker

The AS-30 was an air-to-ground missile built by Nord Aviation. It was a precision attack weapon designed to be used against high-value targets such as bridges and bunkers. The AS-30 was essentially a larger version of the earlier AS-20 design, and initially used that weapon's guidance system, which required pilots to track the weapon visually and correct its path using a small joystick, while also flying their own aircraft. All such MCLOS systems proved very difficult to use in practice. The updated AS-30L replaced this system with a semi-active laser homing system, which allows the missile to fly to the target without operator intervention. About 60 AS-30Ls were launched during Operation Desert Storm and Operation Deliberate Force with great success.

== Design ==
The first AS-30 was a development of the 1960s Nord AS-20, to allow both an increase in range and a much larger warhead, and is almost identical to the earlier AS-20 in design. The AS-30 has four large steeply swept back fins such as those on the AS-20, cruciform in cross-section around the midsection of its body. However, because of its larger size, the AS-30 in addition has four smaller fins at the rear of the missile body to increase stability in flight.

The AS-30 has a two-stage solid-fuel rocket motor. A short-burn-time booster section exhausts through two large nozzles located midway between the rear edges of the missile's large fins, after which a longer-burn-time sustainer ignites, and exhausts through a nozzle located at the center of the back of the missile body. As with the AS-20, the AS-30 uses a simple MCLOS guidance with the pilot aligning the flares located near the missile's rear with the target and controlling the missile in flight after launch with a small joystick, sending steering commands to the missile via a radio link. The steering commands steer the missile back to the line-of-sight by thrust vectoring, by the movement of one of four metal vanes around the sustainer nozzle. The missile's internal gyro gives the missile command unit the correct position of the missile in flight, so each of the four thrust vanes can actuate at the correct time to steer the missile back to the correct flight path.

== AS-30L ==
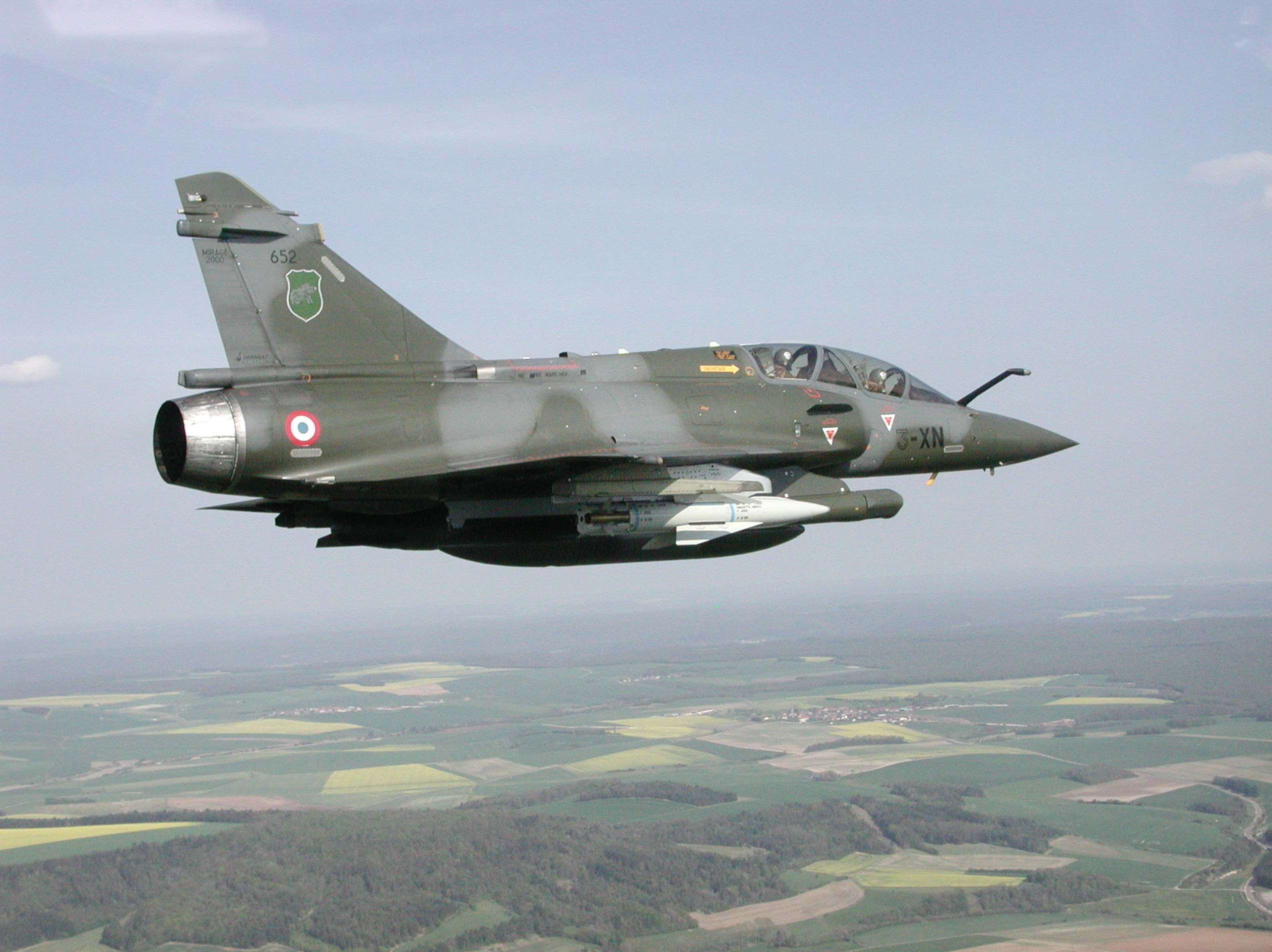
Dassault Mirage 2000D and one AS-30L.

The AS-30L is a French short-to-medium range air-to-ground missile which employs laser homing guidance. The AS-30L was a development of the earlier 1970s AS-30 missile, which uses MCLOS guidance via a radio command link between the aircraft and the missile. The only difference between the AS-30 and AS-30L is their guidance systems. In appearance, the earlier AS-30 has a sharp nose and the AS-30L has a slightly blunted nose. The AS-30L is employed for attacking targets which require a high degree of precision to engage effectively, but are also potentially dangerous enough to necessitate a longer-distance "stand off" attack profile to reduce the danger to the aircraft and pilot to ground-based anti-aircraft defences. The missile has a range of 3 to 11 kilometers, carries a 240 kilogram warhead, and claims a 1-meter CEP with either airborne or ground-based laser designators.

== Operational life ==
The South African Air Force used several Blackburn Buccaneers armed with AS-30 missiles to sink the SS Wafra on March 10, 1971 but without success.

All Peruvian AS-30s were ceded by the Peruvian Air Force to Argentina during the 1982 Falklands War, together with ten Mirage 5P fighters.

The AS-30L was deployed by Iraqi Mirage F1 aircraft during the Iran–Iraq War.

The AS-30L was deployed by French SEPECAT Jaguar aircraft during Operation Desert Storm in Iraq and Operation Deliberate Force in Bosnia, with roughly 60 missiles being launched. It was proven highly effective and accurate, with a claimed hit rate of 97%.

The AS-30L was deployed by French Super Étendard naval aircraft during Opération Harmattan in Libya. At that time it was no longer in service with the Armée de l'Air.

== Variants ==
AS-30
Initial production variant using MCLOS guidance via a radio command link.
AS-30L
The AS-30 with semi-active laser homing guidance.

== Operators ==
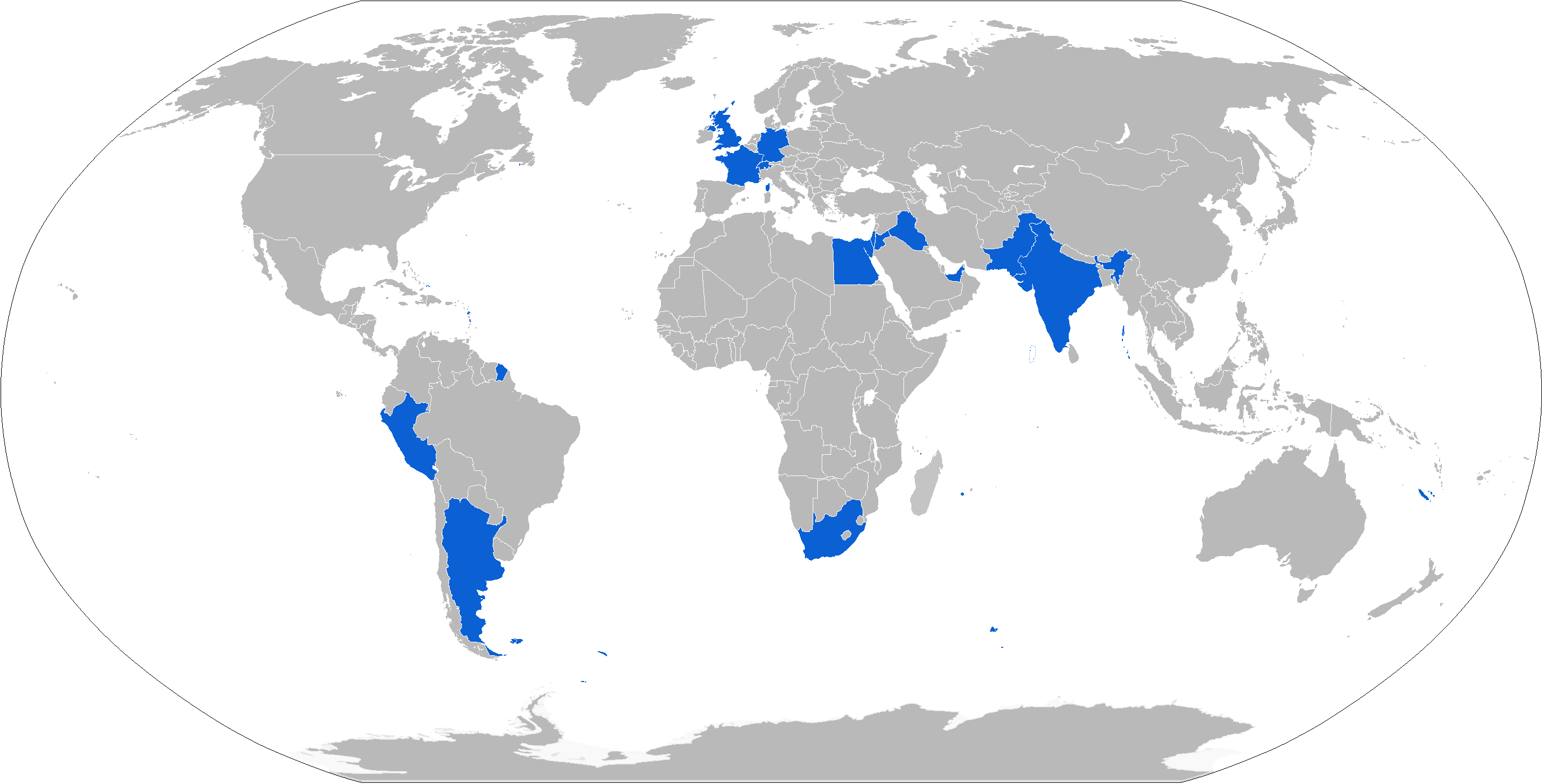
Map with AS-30 operators in blue

=== Current and former operators ===
Egypt
France
Germany
India
Iraq
Peru
South Africa
Switzerland
United Kingdom
