= Nord Aviation =

Defunct French aircraft manufacturer

- Company type: State-owned
- Industry: Aviation
- Predecessor: SFECMAS · SNCAN
- Founded: 1 October 1954; 71 years ago
- Defunct: 1 March 1970
- Fate: Merged into Aérospatiale
- Headquarters: Bourges, France

Société nationale de constructions aéronautiques Nord Aviation (lit. 'National Aeronautical Construction Company North Aviation') was a state-owned French aircraft manufacturer. The bulk of its facilities were based at the Bourges airport in central France.

On 1 October 1954, Nord Aviation was created as a result of the merger of SFECMAS and SNCAN. The company's name, Nord, also became commonly used as a generic name referring to the Pingouin light aircraft. It manufactured numerous aircraft; perhaps Nord Aviation's most successful aircraft was the Nord Noratlas, a utility transport used by both military and civilian customers. Other aircraft included general aviation, trainers and experimental aircraft, as well as other transports. Nord Aviation also developed and produced its own range of missiles; perhaps the most famous of these was the Exocet, a sea-skimming anti-ship missile.

On 1 March 1970, Nord Aviation merged with Sud Aviation and SEREB to form the 'Société nationale d'industrie aérospatiale (SNIAS), which would soon after be renamed Aérospatiale.

== History ==
Following the end of the Second World War, France's aviation industries began to rebuild and reestablish themselves; many companies chose to consolidate and merge with one another during this period. On 1 October 1954, Nord Aviation was created as a result of the acquisition of SFECMAS (Société française d'étude et de construction de matériels aéronautiques spéciaux) by SNCAN (Société nationale de constructions aéronautiques du Nord).

A year prior to the company's creation, the development of what can be regarded as perhaps Nord Aviation's most successful aircraft, the Nord Noratlas, had been completed. Nord continued the programme to schedule, fulfilling its initial contract for 34 aircraft by 25 June 1953; the Armée de l'Air went on to order another 174 Noratlases. Eventually, a total of 228 aircraft would enter French service. In addition to this sizeable domestic appetite, the Noratlas was an export success as well; the newly formed nation of West Germany decided to address the German Air Force's requirement for new transport aircraft by ordering a total of 187 Noratlases, the first of which were delivered during 1956. While the first 25 aircraft were manufactured in France, the remaining 161 Noratlases were locally manufactured by the West German-based Flugzeugbau Nord company; such aircraft were designated as N-2501D. Flugzeugbau Nord had been involved in the Noratlas programme from an early stage, it being the company's first post-war aviation project, having been responsible for the design and manufacture of the majority of the aircraft's fuselage. In addition to these and other military customers, the Noratlas was also manufactured for the civil market, including a specialised de-militarised model designated N-2502A/B.

Several of Nord Aviation's aircraft never progressed beyond the experimental stage of development. One of the more radical designs was the Nord 1500 Griffon, a ramjet-powered fighter aircraft developed during the mid-1950s to meet a French Air Force specification for a Mach 2 fighter. Two prototypes were ordered initially in a letter dated 24 August 1953, with the final contract, (No. 2003/55) in 1955; although intended to eventually fulfil a requirement for a light interceptor capable of operation from 1,000m grass runways, the two prototypes were ordered without military equipment for research purposes only. Production of the envisioned operational versions, often referred to as the Super Griffon, did not take place as it was found that the requirements could be met and exceeded with less complex and cheaper aircraft such as the more conventional Dassault Mirage III.

In addition to its range of aircraft, Nord Aviation also developed and manufactured a range of missiles; perhaps the most famous of these was the Exocet, a sea-skimming anti-ship missile. Development was started by Nord during 1967 under the designation of MM 38; its basic body design was based on the AS-30 air-to-ground tactical missile. The air-launched version of the Exocet was developed during the 1970s, it entered service with the French Navy in 1979. The missile gained a level of infamy for its use during the Falklands War of 1982, in which several British ships were damaged or sunk by Exocets launched by Argentinian forces. Both the Royal Navy destroyer HMS Sheffield and the 15,000-ton merchant ship Atlantic Conveyor were lost to use of the Exocet. Separately, an American frigate, the USS Stark, was also damaged by two Exocet missiles launched by an Iraqi Air Force Dassault Mirage F1 while patrolling off the coast of Saudi Arabia.

On 1 March 1970, Nord Aviation merged with Sud Aviation to create Société nationale d'industrie aérospatiale (SNIAS), which was promptly renamed Aérospatiale. In turn, this company would ultimately merge into European aerospace corporation EADS in 2000, which was subsequently rebranded as the Airbus Group.

== Aircraft production (for SNCAN and Nord Aviation) ==
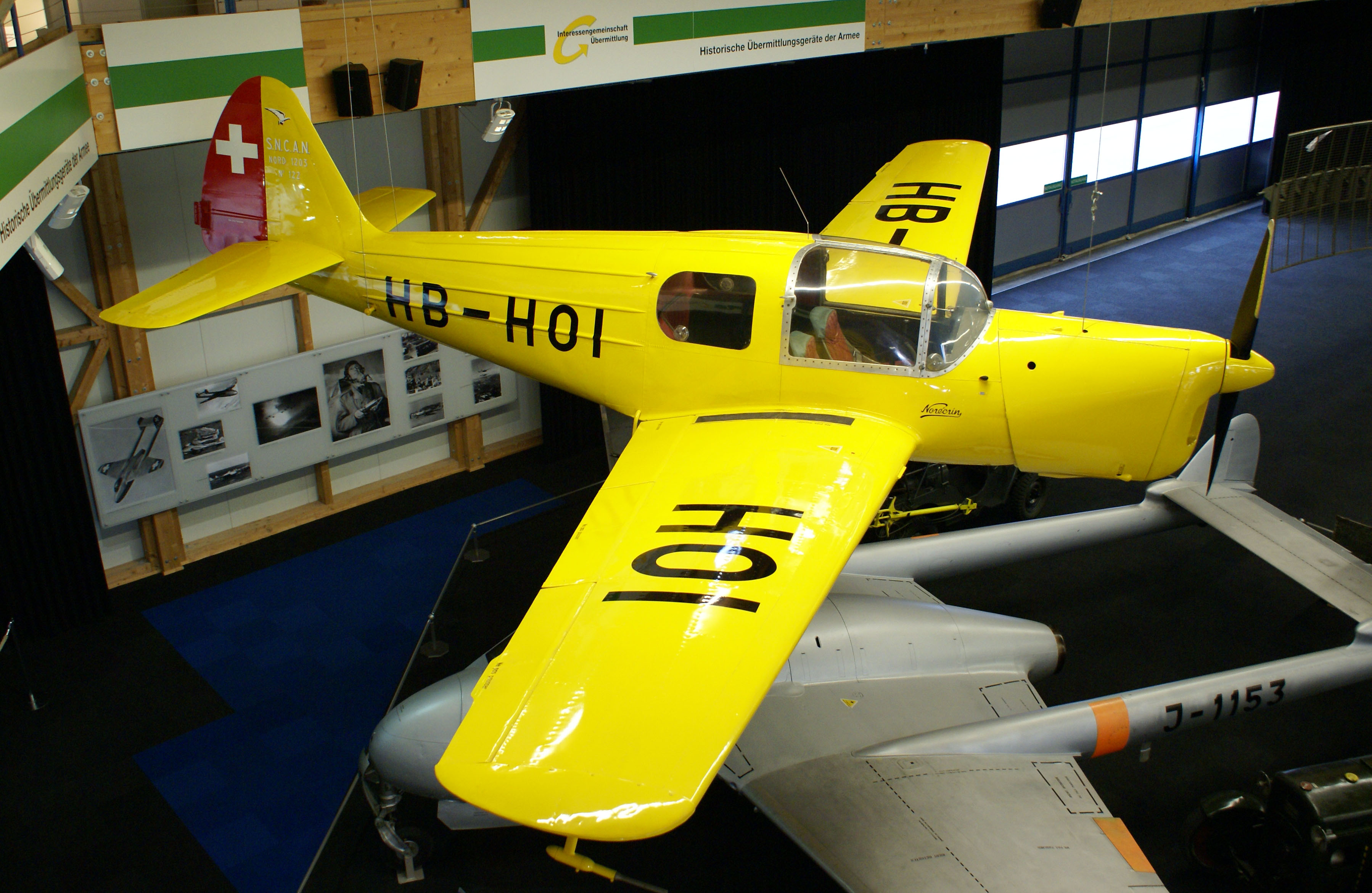
Nord 1203 Norécrin trainer

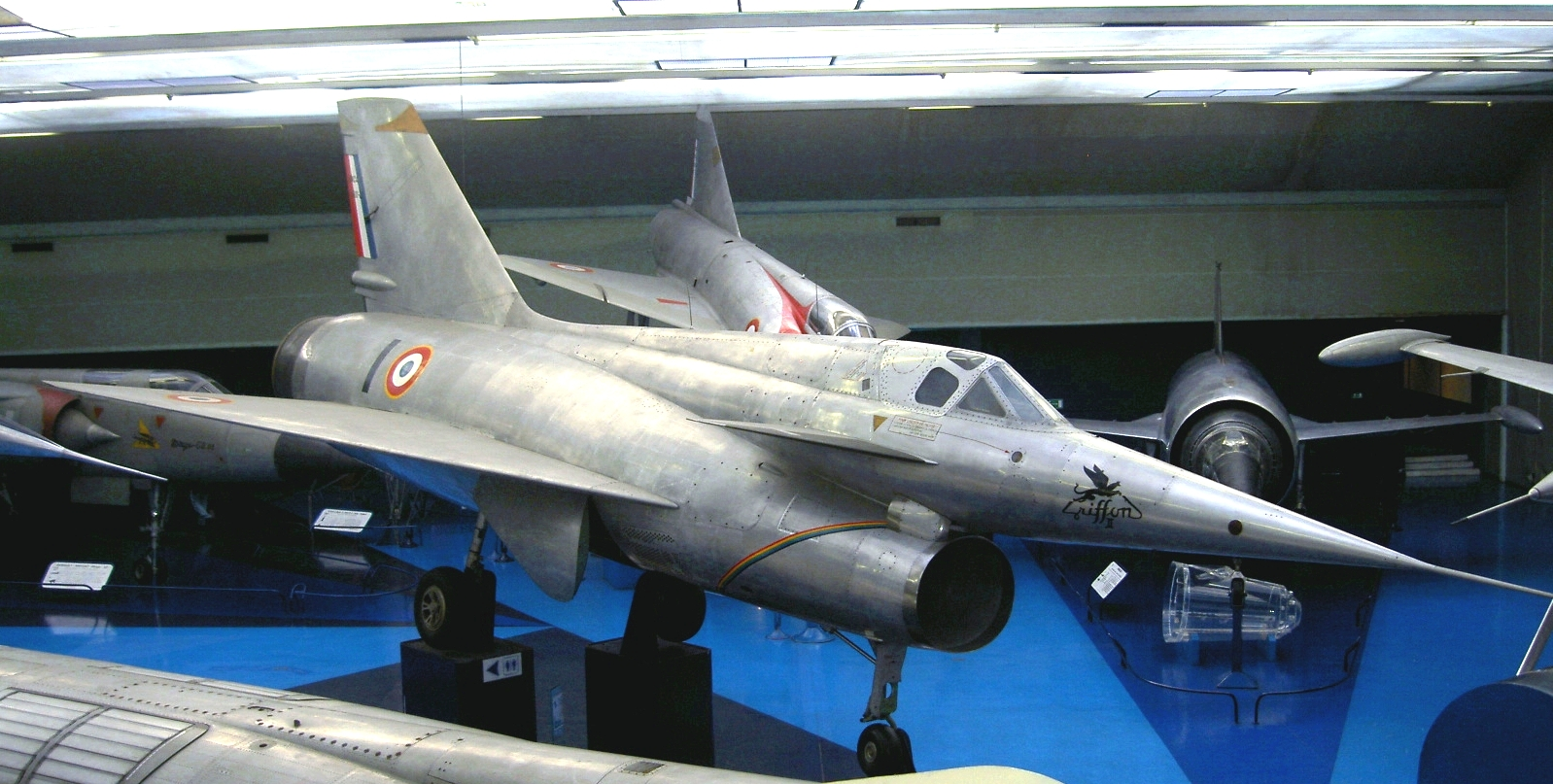
Nord 1500 prototype

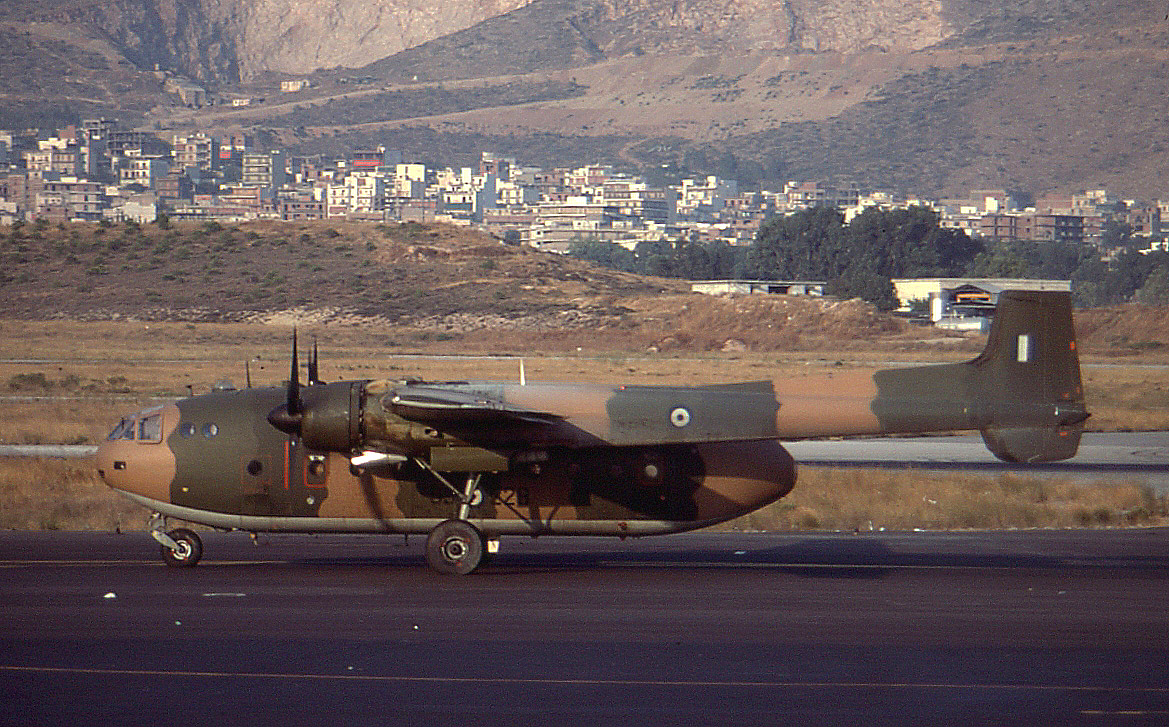
Noratlas military transport

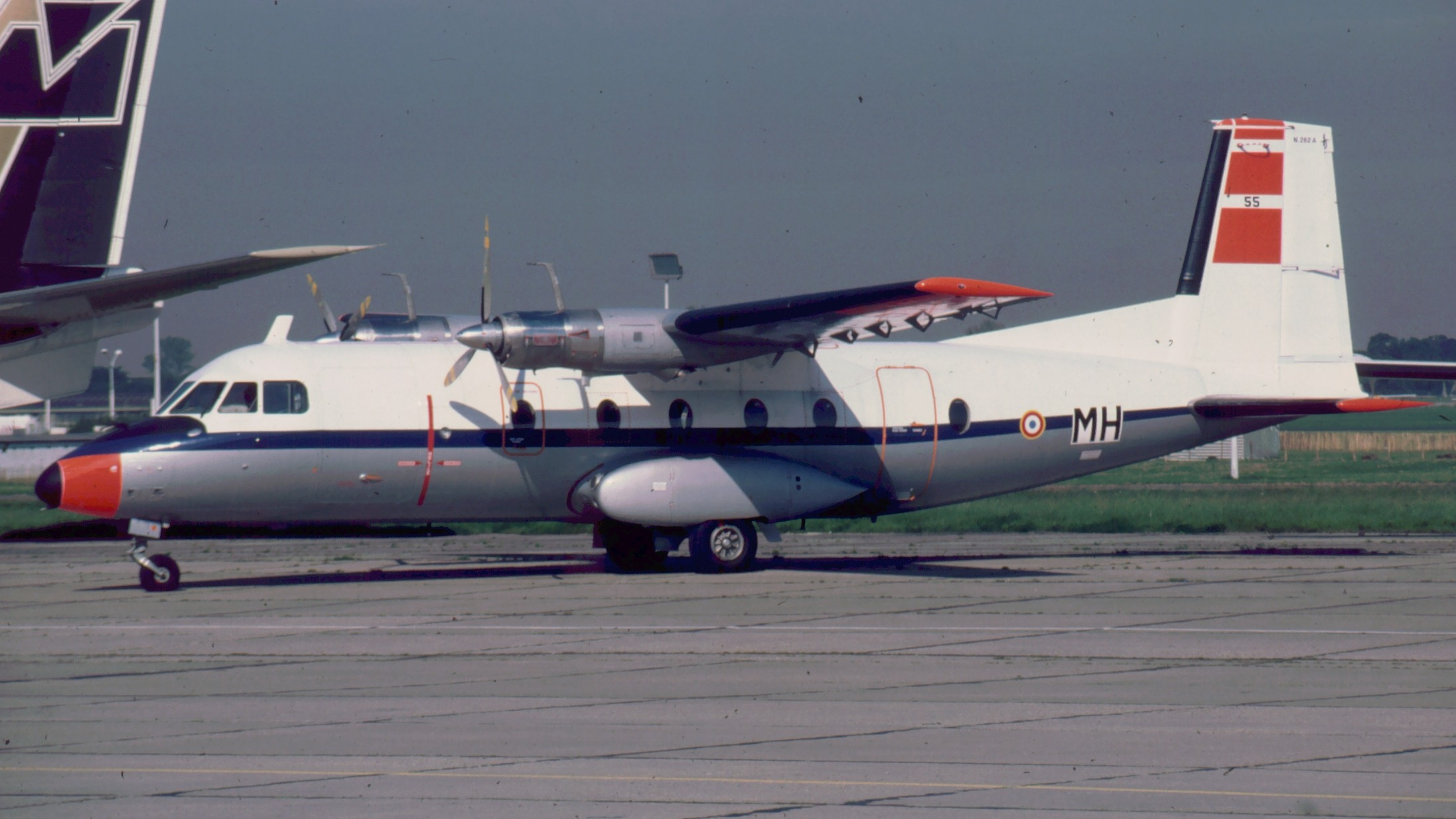
Nord 262 airliner

Data from:Aviafrance SNCAN and Aviafrance Nord

Model	Year	Note
Nord 1000 Pingouin	1944	Communications and Liaison
Nord 1001 Pingouin I	1946	Communications and Liaison
Nord 1002 Pingouin II	1946	Communication and Liaison
Nord 1100 Noralpha	1944	Prototype - Liaison
Nord 1101 Noralpha	1946	Liaison
Nord 1102 Noralpha		Liaison
Nord 1104 Noralpha	1950	Liaison - Engine test
Nord 1110 Nord-Astazou	1958	Engine Test
Nord 1200 Norécrin	1945	Tourer - Prototype
Nord 1201 Norécrin	1947	Four-seat cabin monoplane
Nord 1202 Norécrin II		Tourer
Nord 1203 Norécrin II	1947	Tourer
Nord 1203 Norécrin III	1947	Tourer
Nord 1203 Norécrin IV	1947	Tourer
Nord 1203 Norécrin V	1947	Tourer
Nord 1204 Norécrin	1953	Tourer
Nord 1221 Norélan	1948	Light Trainer
Nord 1222 Norélan	1949	Light Trainer
Nord 1223 Norélan		Light Trainer
Nord 1226 Norélan		Engine test bed
Nord 1300	1945	Training Glider
Nord 1400 Noroit	1948	Flying Boat
Nord 1401 Noroit	1949	Flying Boat
Nord 1402 Noroit	1949	Flying Boat
Nord 1402A Gerfaut IA	1954	Delta-wing research aircraft
Nord 1402B Gerfaut IB		Delta-wing research aircraft
Nord 1405 Gerfaut II	1956	Delta-Wing research aircraft
Nord 1500 Noréclair	1947	Carrier Torpedo Bomber
Nord 1500 Griffon I	1955	Research aircraft
Nord 1500 Griffon II	1957	Research aircraft
Nord 1601	1950	Research aircraft
Nord 1700 Norélic	1947	Research helicopter
Nord 1710	1950	Research helicopter
Nord 1750 Norelfe	1954	Research helicopter
Nord 2000	1948	Glider
Nord 2100 Norazur	1947	Military transport
Nord 2200	1949	Fighter
Nord 2500 Noratlas	1949	Military transport
Nord 2501 Noratlas	1950	Military transport
Nord 2502 Noratlas	1954	Civil transport
Nord 2503 Noratlas	1956	Engine test
Nord 2504 Noratlas	1958	French Navy flying classroom
Nord 2506 Noratlas		Assault transport version
Nord 2507 Noratlas		Rescue version
Nord 2508 Noratlas	1957	Cargo transport
Nord 2800	1950	Trainer
Nord 3200	1954	Primary trainer
Nord 3201	1954	Primary trainer
Nord 3202	1957	Primary trainer
Nord 3212	1957	Instrument flight trainer
Nord 3400 Norbarbe	1958	Army observation
Nord 260	1960	Civil airliner
Nord 262	1962	Civil airliner
Nord 500	1968	VTOL research
Nord CT10	1951	Radio-controlled drone
Nord CT20	1957	Radio-controlled drone
Nord CT41	1957	Radio-controlled drone
Nord R20	1957	Radio-controlled drone
Nord NC.853S	1957	Tourer
Nord NC.853G	1957	Tourer
Nord NC.854	1957	Tourer
Nord NC.854SA	1957	Militarised NC.854
Nord NC.856	1957	
Nord NC.856A Norvegie	1957	Liaison / Observation aircraft
Nord NC.856B	1957	Four seater touring aircraft
Nord NC.856H	1957	Three-seater touring floatplane
Nord NC.856N Norclub	1957	Four-seater touring aircraft
Nord NC.858S	1957	Tourer
Nord NC.859S	1957	Tourer

== Missiles ==
- AA.20
- AS-20
- AS-30
- SS.10
- SS.11
- SS.12/AS.12
- Exocet
