= AS-20 =

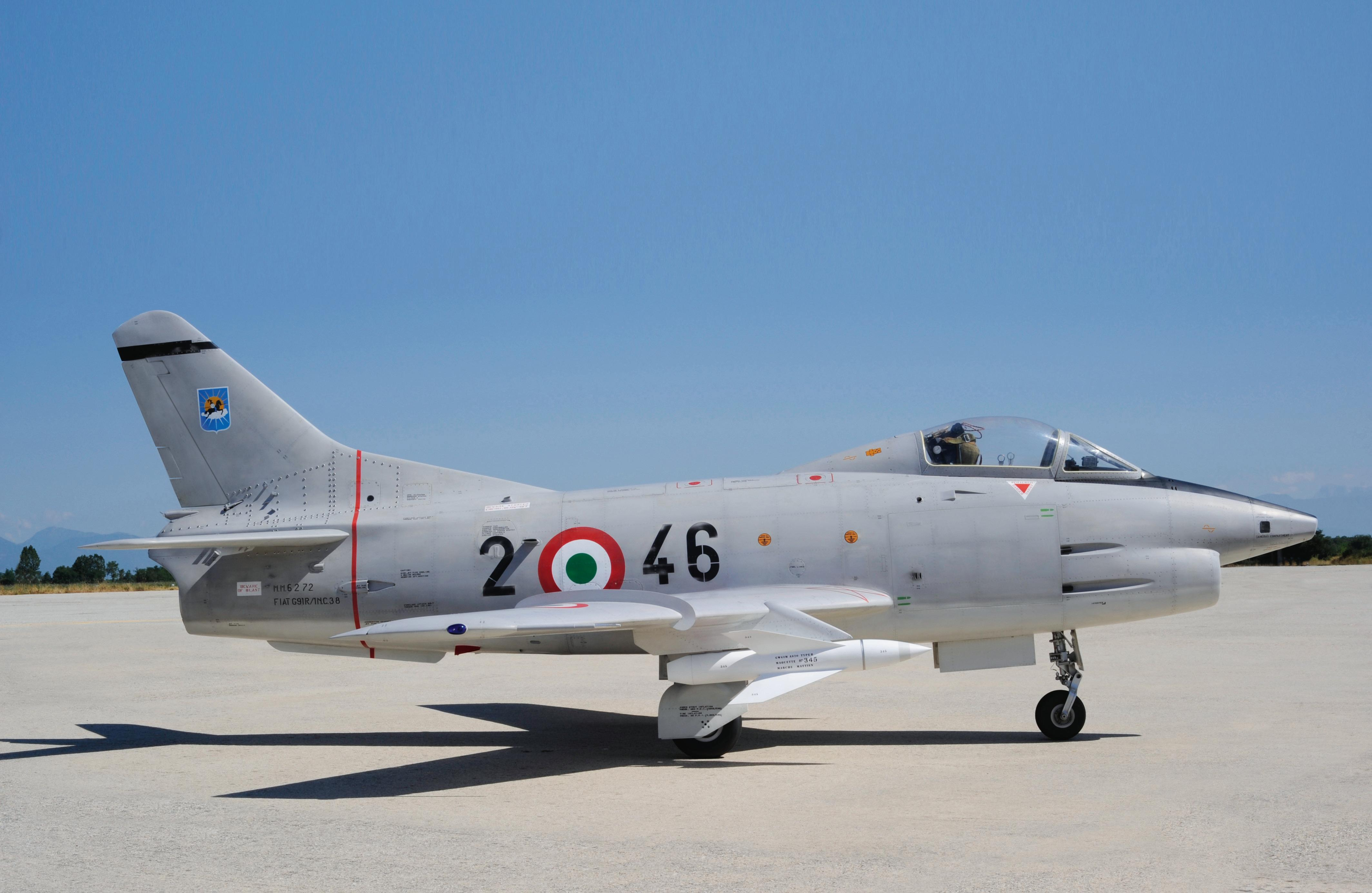
- Italian Fiat G.91 on display with an AS-20 missile model
- Type: air-to-surface missile
- Place of origin: France

Service history
- In service: 1961-1970s
- Used by: France, Germany, Italy, South Africa

Specifications
- Mass: 143 kg (315 lb)
- Length: 260 cm (8 ft 6 in)
- Diameter: 25 cm (9.8 in)
- Wingspan: 80 cm (2 ft 7 in)
- Warhead weight: 33 kg (73 lb)
- Operational range: 10 km (5.4 nmi)
- Maximum speed: Mach 1.7
- Guidance system: MCLOS via radio link

The AS-20 (Type 5110) was a French air-to-surface missile developed during the late 1950s. It was similar to the U.S. AGM-12 Bullpup missile.

== Development ==
The AS-20 was based on an earlier Nord Aviation air-to-air missile the AA.20 (designated Type 5103). Only minor changes were required to make it an air-to-surface missile, the size of the warhead was increased as a result of replacing the large proximity fuze with a simple impact fuze.

== Design ==
The AS-20 had four steeply swept-back fins, cruciform in cross-section around the midsection of its body. It used a dual-thrust solid rocket motor, which exhausted through two large nozzles during the boost stage, and a single center line nozzle during the sustain stage. The AS-20 uses a simple MCLOS guidance with the pilot aligning the flares on the missile's rear with the target and controlling the missile in flight after launch with a small joystick sending steering commands to the missile via a radio link. The steering commands steer the missile back to the line-of-sight by thrust vectoring by the movement of one of four metal vanes around the center sustainer nozzle. The missile's internal gyro gives the missile command unit, the correct position of the missile in flight, and to which of the four thrust vanes to actuate at the correct time.

== Operational history ==
Approximately 8,000 of the missiles were built, with the missile entering service in 1961. The AS-20 was one of the primary weapons of the Fiat G.91 of the West German Air Force and Italian Air Force during the 1960s and 1970s. It was phased out of service in most countries in the 1970s, being replaced in France by the larger AS-30.

== Operators ==
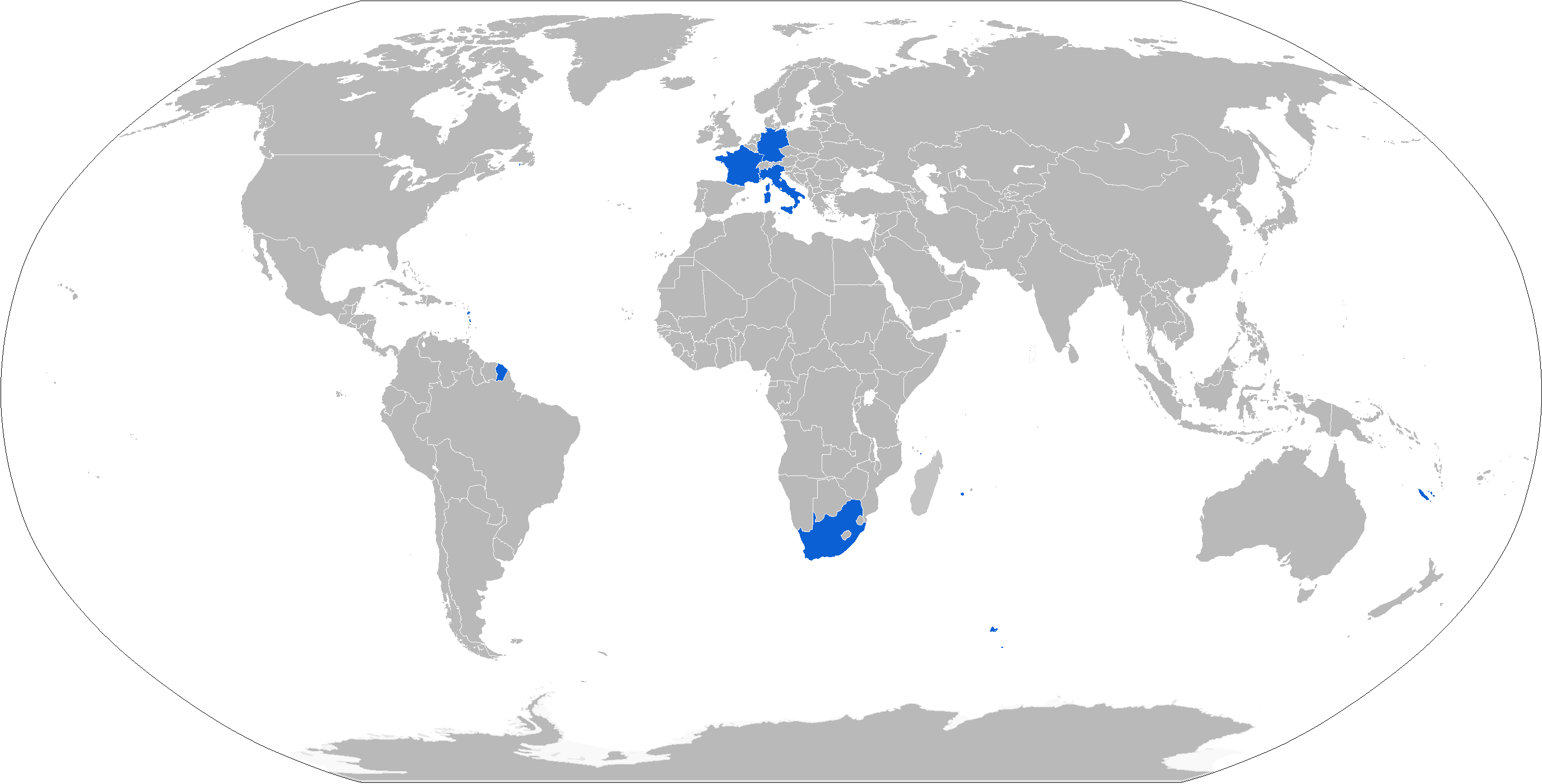
Map with AS-20 operators in blue

=== Former operators ===
France
Germany
Italy
South Africa
