= Potez 6D =

1940s French aircraft piston engine

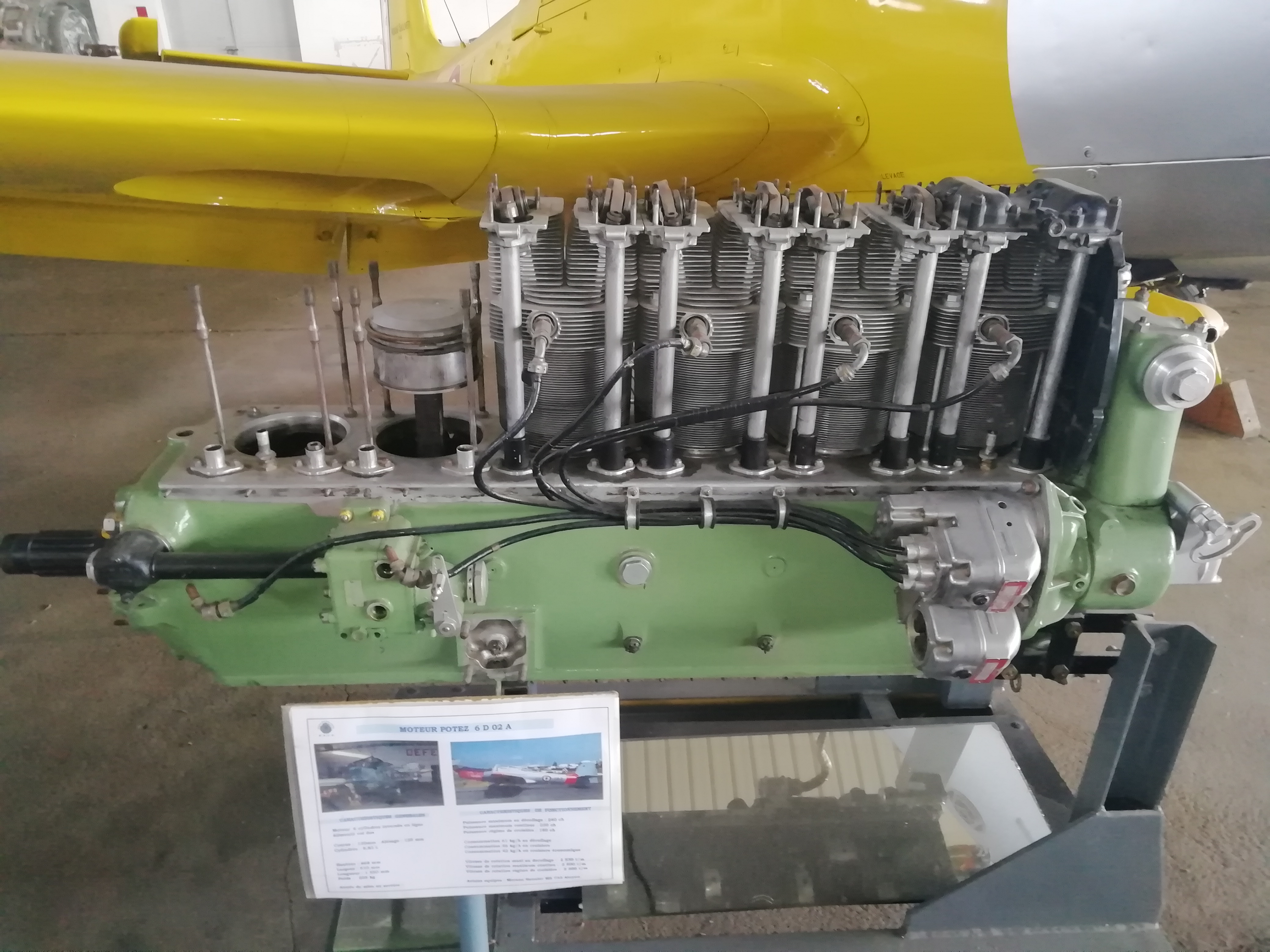
- Potez 6D on display at Musée de l'Aviation de Lyon-Corbas
- Type: Six-cylinder air-cooled inline piston engine
- National origin: France
- Manufacturer: Société de Avions et Moteurs Henry Potez
- Major applications: Morane-Saulnier Alcyon

The Potez 6D is a French six-cylinder inverted inline aircraft engine put into production after World War II in normal and supercharged versions. Unsupercharged, it produced a take-off power of 179 kW (240 hp) at 2,530 rpm.

== Design and development ==
In the 1930s Potez planned a series of new engines to replace their Anzani-derived radial engines. The Potez 4D, a four-cylinder inverted inline engine ran before World War II but did not reach production until the late 1940s, when it was joined by another inverted inline, the six-cylinder 6D, and an eight-cylinder inverted-V, the Potez 8D. The D-series engines had much in common, most obviously sharing pistons and cylinders, with the same stroke, bore and valve gear. The inlines also shared connecting rods and lubrication systems and were offered in normally aspirated or supercharged versions.

== Variants ==
Data from Jane's All the World's aircraft 1956-57 pp. 430–1.

6D-00
6D-02
Similar to 6D-30A without supercharger and 2x Hobson A1.55/j downdraught carburettors - 179 kW (240 hp) at 2,530 rpm
6D-30A
Supercharged version with a centrifugal blower (14.0:1 drive ratio) mounted horizontally on top of engine and with fuel injection, giving a normal power of 194 kW (260 hp) with 227 kW (305 hp) for take-off.
6D-30B
Supercharger drive ratio 15.5:1, 254 kW (340 hp) for take-off at 2,400 rpm.

== Applications ==
- Morane-Saulnier Alcyon - over 200 built
- Nord Noralpha
- Nord Norécrin

== Survivors ==
- Several Alcyons still fly in France. In 2014 there were 34 on the French civil register.

== Specifications (Potez 6D-02) ==
Data from Jane's All the World's aircraft 1956-57 pp.430-1.

=== General characteristics ===
- Type: Six-cylinder air-cooled inverted piston engine.
- Bore: 125 mm (4.92 in)
- Stroke: 120 mm (4.72 in)
- Displacement: 8.83 L (539 cu in)
- Length: 1,550 mm (61.02 in)
- Width: 510 mm (20.08 in)
- Height: 668.5 mm (26.32 in)
- Dry weight: 235 kg (518 lb) without accessories.

=== Components ===
- Valvetrain: Two valves/cylinder; exhaust valve sodium cooled. Valves operated from camshaft in overhead crankcase vis push-rods, roller tappets and rocker arms.
- Supercharger: None.
- Fuel system: Two Hobson AI55/J carburettors with auto altitude correction. Provision for aerobatics. Double magneto, two plugs/cylinder.
- Fuel type: 80 Octane minimum
- Oil system: Dry sump; one pressure and two scavenging pumps.
- Cooling system: Air.
- Reduction gear: Direct
- Pistons, connecting rods and crankshaft: Y-alloy pistons with two compression and two scraper rings. I-section forged aluminium alloy connecting rods, with split big-ends and lead -bronze bearings. Six throw, forged nitrided Ni-Cr-Mo steel crankshaft. Ball thrust bearing and seven lead-bronze plated bearings. Cast aluminium-alloy crankcase.

=== Performance ===
- Power output: Normal at sea level, 172 kW (230 hp) at 2,500 rpm; take-off, 179 kW (240 hp) at 2,530 rpm.
- Compression ratio: 7:1
- Fuel consumption: At economical cruising (101 kW (135 hp)), 27.7 kg (61.1 lb)/hour.

== See also ==
Related lists

- List of aircraft engines
