= Nord 1500 Noréclair =

General information
- Type: Maritime patrol aircraft
- National origin: France
- Manufacturer: Nord Aviation
- Number built: 1

History
- First flight: 1947

The Nord 1500 Noréclair was a prototype French twin-engined dive bomber and anti-submarine warfare aircraft built at the end of the Second World War. It would have carried both torpedoes, missiles, and bombs. The aircraft was built in response to a need for a dive bomber and anti-submarine aircraft that could be launched both from land and from an aircraft carrier. The first prototype flew on 29 August 1947. The tests revealed many issues that had to be resolved. Eventually the project was abandoned after being criticized heavily and discovering many problems.

== Specifications ==
General characteristics

- Crew: 2/3
- Length: 14.25 m (46 ft 9 in)
- Wingspan: 19.7 m (64 ft 8 in)
- Height: 6.54 m (21 ft 5 in)
- Wing area: 46 m^{2} (500 sq ft)
- Empty weight: 8,654 kg (19,079 lb)
- Gross weight: 11,989 kg (26,431 lb)
- Powerplant: 2 × Gnome-Rhône 14R-25 radials, 1,200 kW (1,600 hp) each

Performance

- Maximum speed: 540 km/h (340 mph, 290 kn)
- Stall speed: 144 km/h (89 mph, 78 kn)
- Range: 3,450 km (2,140 mi, 1,860 nmi)
- Service ceiling: 10,000 m (33,000 ft)

Armament

- 1 × 450 mm (17.7 in) torpedo or 2 tons of bombs/anti-submarine charges
- 2 × rear-mounted 20 mm (0.8 in) MG 151 cannon
- Rockets
