= Morane-Saulnier Alcyon =

French 1949 trainer airplane

MS-733 Alcyon
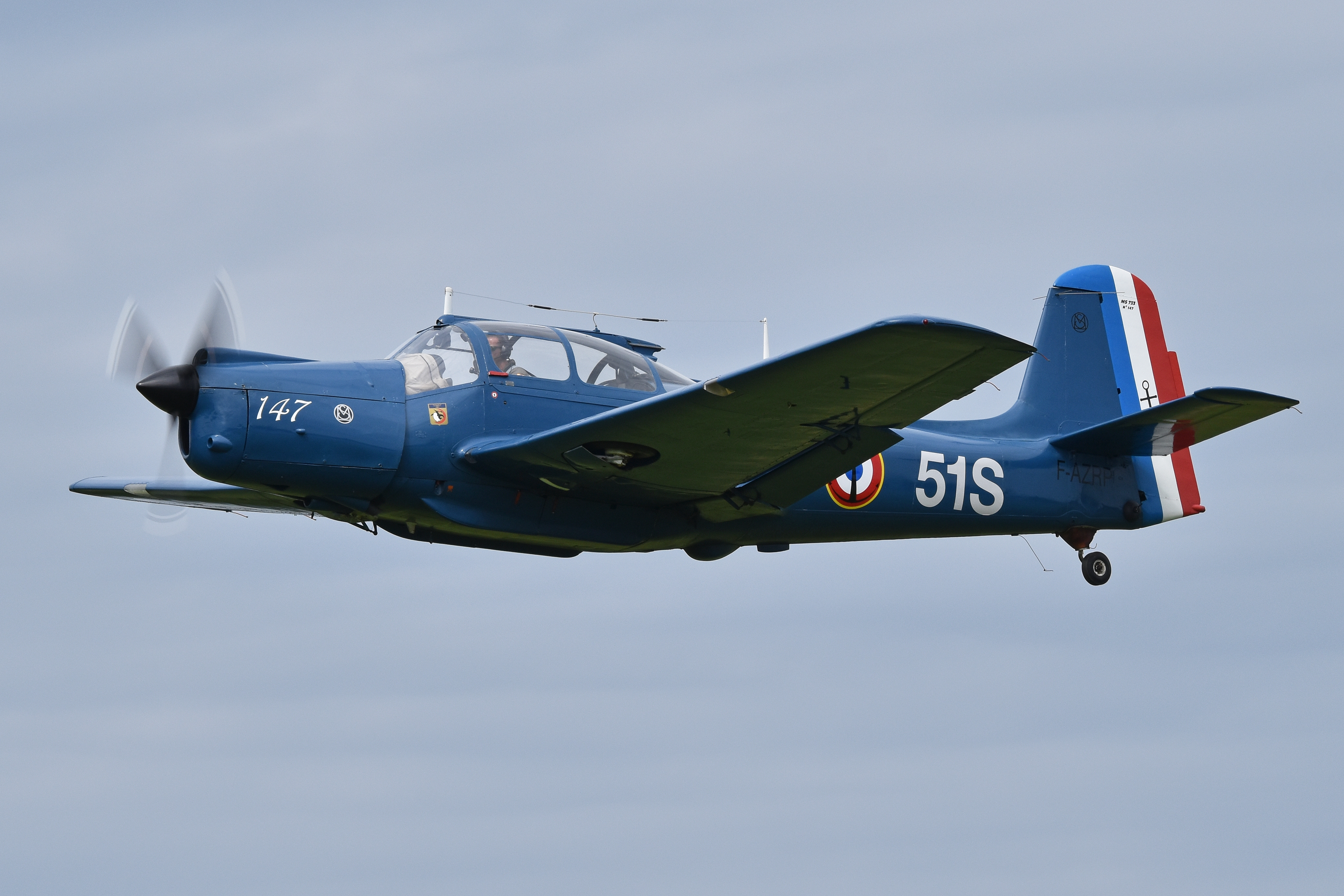
- A privately owned Alcyon wearing markings of No 51 Escadrilles de Servitude

General information
- Type: Basic trainer
- National origin: France
- Manufacturer: Morane-Saulnier
- Status: Several flown by private owners
- Primary user: French Air Force
- Number built: 208

History
- First flight: 1949

The Morane-Saulnier Alcyon (en: Kingfisher) is a two or three-seat basic training monoplane designed and built in France by Morane-Saulnier.

== Design and development ==
Designed as a basic trainer for the French military the prototype MS.730 first flew on 11 August 1949. The prototype was a low-wing cantilever monoplane with a fixed tailwheel landing gear and powered by a 180 hp (130 kW) Mathis 8G.20 inverted V8 engine. The engine was replaced with a German war-surplus 240 hp (180 kW) Argus As 10 and the prototype flew again in November 1949 as the MS.731. Two further prototypes were built and flown in 1951 designated MS.732, they were each powered by a Potez 6D 02 engine and the original fixed landing gear of the prototype was replaced with retractable main wheels.

== Operational history ==
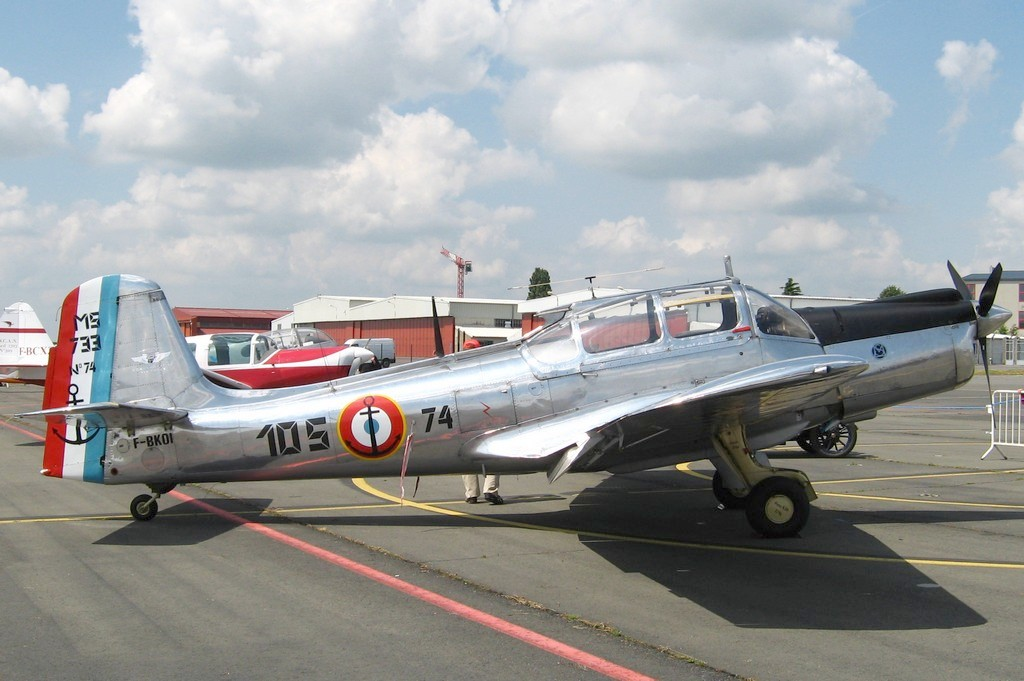
Preserved MS.733 with French Navy markings on display in France, 2009.

The production version that followed was designated the MS.733, with five pre-production aircraft and 200 production aircraft. The aircraft were delivered to the French Navy (40), the French Air Force (145) and the Cambodian Air Force (15). Seventy of the French Air Force aircraft were fitted with machine guns for gunnery training and some of these were later converted for counter-insurgency operations (and re-designated MS.733A) for use in Algeria. After the war, some aircraft were sold to Morocco.

The Alcyon was a successful trainer, capable of basic aerobatic maneuvers. It was often used in replacement of pre-war vintage Stampe SV.4 biplanes. Several civilian flying schools, including Air France, used the Alcyon. For the time, it was well equipped with full IFR equipment: two VOR-ILS sets, one ADF set, two VHF radios, a radar altimeter, an attitude indicator, and a directional gyroscope. For this reason, it was often used for navigation training as it was far cheaper to operate than the twin-engine designs commonly used for that task.

Since retirement by the French military services, several Alcyons have been restored to flying condition in France by private pilot owners and groups.

== Variants ==
MS.730
Prototype powered by a 180 hp (134 kW) Mathis 8G.20 engine, one built later re-engined as the MS.731.
MS.731
Prototype re-engined with a 240 hp (179 kW) Argus As 10 engine.
MS.732
Prototypes powered by a 200 hp (149 kW) Salmson 8.AS.02 engine and retractable landing gear, two built.
MS.733
Production variant with a 240 hp (179 kW) Potez 6D 02 engine, five pre-production and 200 production aircraft built.
MS.733A
MS.733 gunnery trainers modified for counter-insurgency role; it served from 1955 to 1959. It was replaced by the T-28S Fennec
The COIN upgrade included a SFOM 83 reflector sight (suspended from the cockpit roof), two x 7.5mm MAC 1934/M39 machine guns in the wings (with 500 rounds each), and two under-wing hardpoints.
Typical hardpoint loadout used paired Matra Type 14 rocket rails, which held four (stacked 2 x 2) SERAM 28 kg (62 lb) T10 heavy rockets and had a smaller hardpoint between the rocket rails rated for a 50 kg (110 lb) bomb.
MS.735
Powered by 305 hp (227 kW) supercharged Potez 6D 30 engine.

== Operators ==
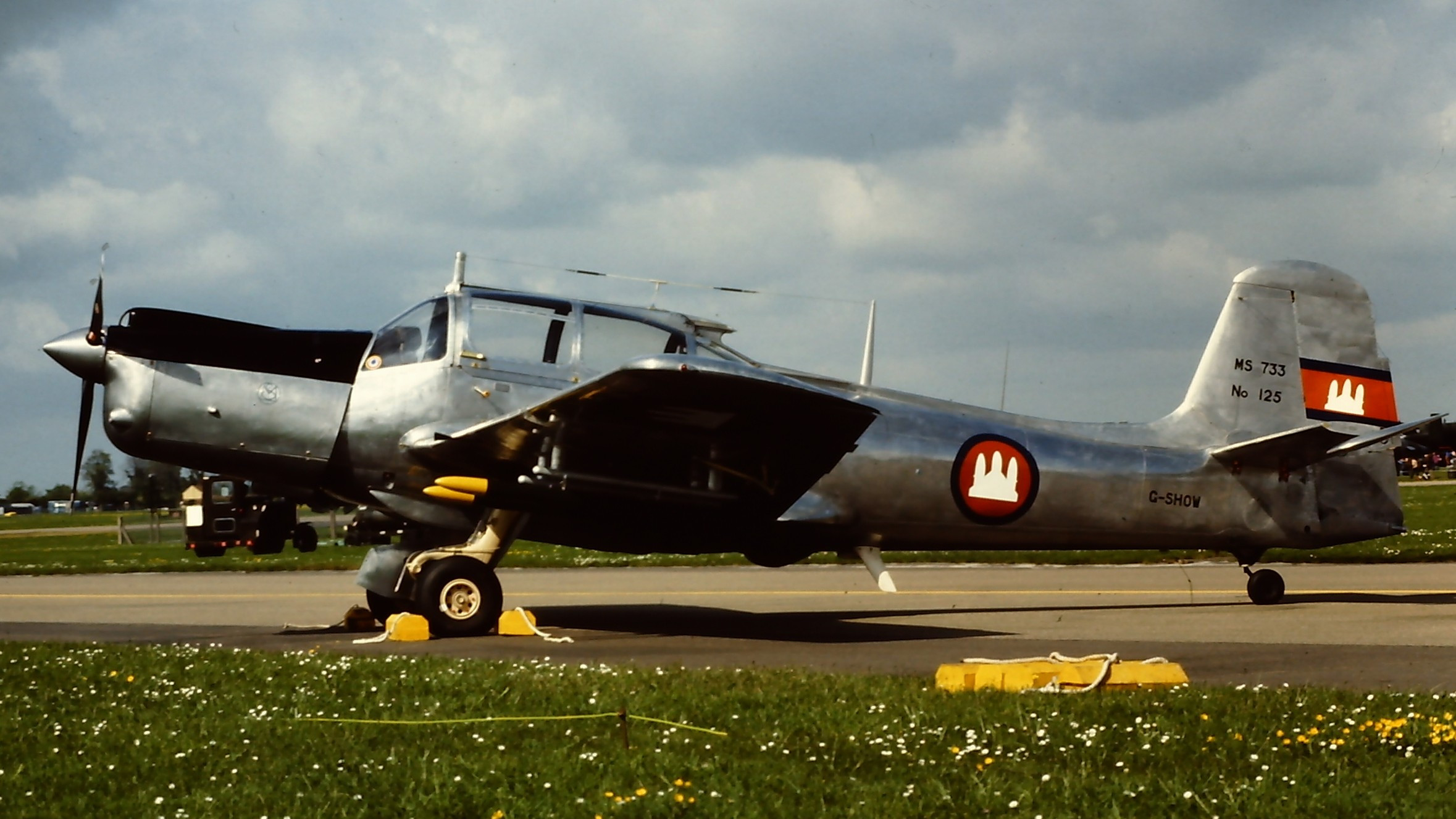
A 1956-built MS.733 in 1981 in Royal Cambodian Air Force markings

Cambodia

- Cambodian Air Force: 15 MS.733A aircraft were sold to Cambodia for training and COIN duties.

France

- French Air Force: 145 MS.733 trainer aircraft. Several were converted to MS.733A COIN models; after the Algerian War they were either sold or converted back to MS.733 trainers.
- French Navy: 40 MS.733 trainer aircraft. They did not have carrier landing equipment because they were used exclusively at land bases.
- Air France: Five civilianized MS.733 models were bought as single-engine trainers.

Khmer Republic

- Khmer Air Force

Morocco

- Moroccan Air Force: Bought several MS.733A aircraft for COIN duties.

== Specifications (MS.733) ==
Data from

General characteristics

- Crew: 2 or 3
- Length: 9.32 m (30 ft 7 in)
- Wingspan: 11.28 m (37 ft 0 in)
- Height: 2.42 m (7 ft 11.25 in)
- Wing area: 21.90 m^{2} (235.74 sq ft)
- Empty weight: 1,260 kg (2,778 lb)
- Gross weight: 1,670 kg (3,682 lb)
- Powerplant: 1 × Potez 6D.30 inverted inline piston engine , 179 kW (240 hp)

Performance

- Maximum speed: 260 km/h (162 mph, 141 kn)
- Cruise speed: 230 km/h (143 mph, 124 kn)
- Range: 920 km (572 mi, 497 nmi)
- Endurance: 4 hours 40 minutes
- Service ceiling: 4,800 m (15,750 ft)
- Rate of climb: 5.0 m/s (985 ft/min)

Armament

- 2 x 7.5mm MAC 1934/M39 machineguns (MS.733A only); training models were unarmed.
- 2 x hardpoints (MS.733A only); training models did not have hardpoints.

== See also ==
Related lists

- List of military aircraft of France
