= Nord Noroit =

Noroit
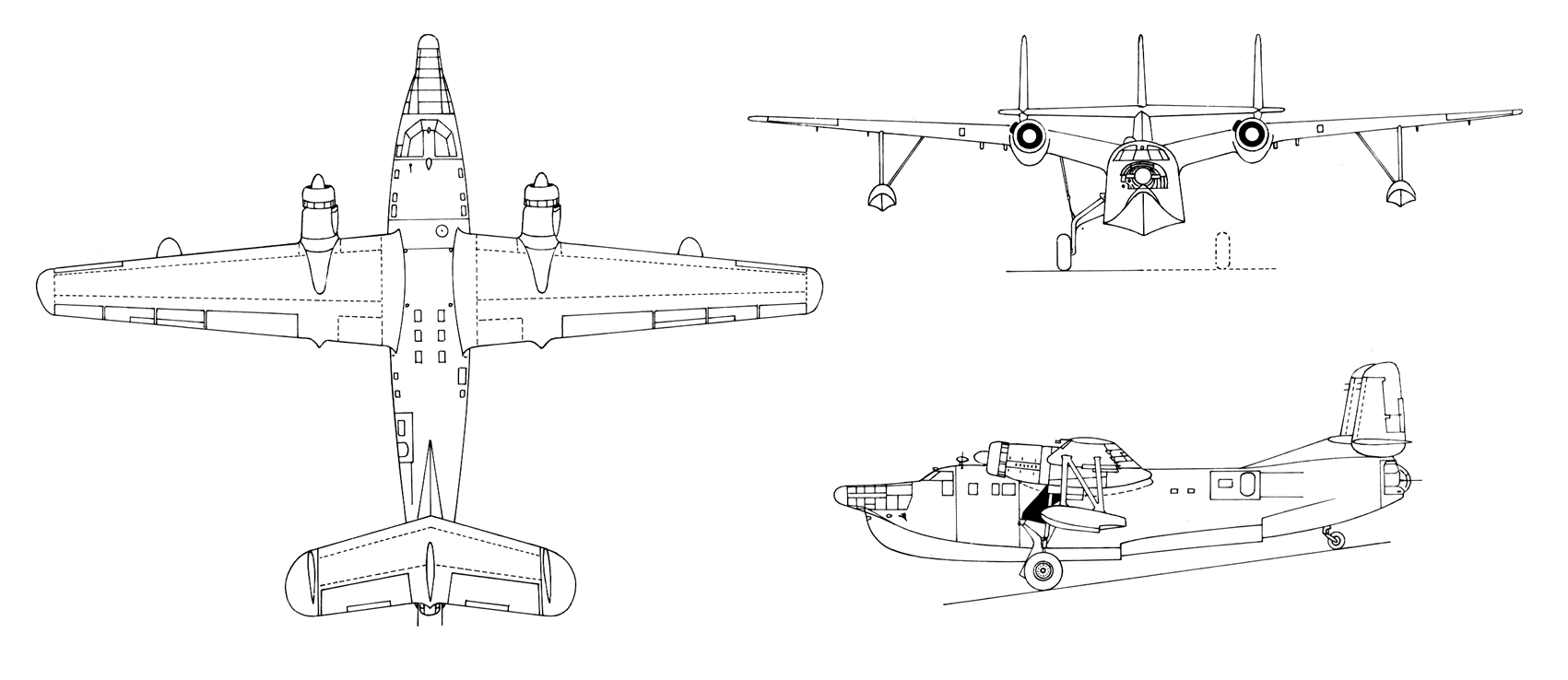

General information
- Type: Reconnaissance and air-sea rescue flying-boat
- Manufacturer: Nord Aviation
- Primary user: French Navy

History
- First flight: 6 January 1949

The Nord 1400 Noroit was a French reconnaissance and air-sea rescue flying boat designed and built by Nord Aviation for the French Navy.

== Development ==
The Noroit was an amphibian flying boat designed for the French Navy, a cantilever gullwing monoplane with a two-step hull. It had a cantilever horizontal tail surface with three vertical surfaces. It had an enclosed cabin for the seven crew with a large cabin in the rear for use in rescue operations. The aircraft had two engines located one on each wing leading edge. The prototype as a flying boat first flew on 6 January 1949 powered by two 1,200 kW (1,600 hp) Gnome-Rhône 14R radial engines. The second aircraft was fitted with a retractable tailwheel landing gear for amphibious operation which was later retrofitted to the prototype. The next two aircraft first flown in 1949 were designated the Nord 1401 Noroit and were fitted with two 1,300 kW (1,800 hp) Junkers Jumo 213 engines and both were also tested with two Bristol Hercules radial engines. These two aircraft were modified to production standard as the Nord 1402 Noroit and were followed by 21 production aircraft. The last aircraft was delivered to the French Navy in 1956.

== Variants ==
Nord N.1400 Noroit
Two prototypes with 1,200 kW (1,600 hp) Gnome-Rhône 14R radial engines.
Nord N.1400-01
The first N.1400 Noroit prototype.
Nord N.1400-02
The second N.1400 Noroit prototype.
Nord N.1401 Noroit
Two pre-production aircraft with 1,300 kW (1,800 hp) Junkers Jumo 213 engines, later modified to 1402 standard.
Nord N.1402 Noroit
Production variant, powered by 1,600 kW (2,100 hp) Arsenal 12H engines; 21 built plus two 1401 pre-production aircraft modified.

== Operators ==
France

- French Navy
  - Escadrille 5F

== Specifications (1402) ==
Data from The Illustrated Encyclopedia of Aircraft (Part Work 1982–1985). Orbis Publishing. p. 2617.

General characteristics

- Crew: seven
- Length: 22.05 m (74 ft 4 in)
- Wingspan: 31.60 m (103 ft 8 in)
- Height: 6.85 m (22 ft 5.5 in)
- Wing area: 100 m^{2} (1,076.43 sq ft)
- Powerplant: 2 × Arsenal 12H-00 inverted V-12 piston engine , 1,566 kW (2,100 hp) each

Performance

- Maximum speed: 370 km/h (230 mph, 200 kn)
- Range: 3,450 km (2,144 mi, 1,863 nmi)

Armament

- 6 x 20mm cannon (two each in nose, dorsal and tail turrets)
- Provision for bombs in engine nacelles

== See also ==
Related lists

- List of flying boats and floatplanes
