= Nord 1700 Norélic =

Norélic

General information
- Type: Prototype two seat helicopter
- National origin: France
- Manufacturer: SNCA du Nord (Nord Aviation)
- Designer: André Bruel
- Number built: 1

History
- First flight: 17 November 1947

The Nord 1700 Norélic or SNCAN N.1700 Norélic was a French helicopter with several novel control features. Only one prototype was built, though it was intended to lead to series production.

== Design and development ==
The Norélic was a prototype two-seat, single rotor helicopter with an unusual anti-torque system, without a manual cyclic pitch control. Its two crew sat side by side with large, single curvature transparencies in front of them but with open cockpit sides. The 119 kW (160 hp) Mathis G.7R seven-cylinder radial engine was immediately behind them, with its crankshaft vertical; the Norélic was the first French helicopter with its engine in this orientation. The driveshaft rose through the fuselage to the rotor hub, which was slightly offset forwards on a two side-by-side pillar, faired support. The Norélic had a two-blade articulated rotor with undamped flapping hinges; the blades had the same chord and aerofoil from hub to tip and were each built around a single solid spar with ribs and a thin metal skin, all clamped together. Blade pitch was automatically controlled by small servo or pilot airfoils mounted on rods at right-angles to the rotors. Though reminiscent of the servos on the Hiller 360, those on the Norélic were themselves flappable and were intended to control both cyclic pitch and the flapping amplitude of the main rotors. Thus the cockpit cyclic pitch control was absent, and instead roll was produced by sideways motion of the hub via its parallel support pillars, which separated the centres of lift and gravity. Effects due to variations in the position of the centre of gravity could be trimmed out by longitudinal movements of the hub. The servo blades also served as rotor speed governors; restrained by springs, they could slide outward as the rotor speed began to increase, increasing the pitch and the associated drag to decrease the speed. Collective pitch was thus primarily determined by throttle setting, though there was a collective pitch override lever.

Behind the engine the fuselage was conical, tapering to the tail. Instead of a side-mounted anti-torque tail rotor the Nord used a system patented by its designer where an axially driven pusher propeller, rotating within a circular shroud, forced air through four rotatable, vertical airfoils mounted on the shroud trailing edge. The shroud was intended to protect the propeller from the rotor downwash, to guard the propeller from objects on the ground and protect ground staff from the propeller. Air deflected from the blades balanced rotor torque automatically, using information from a hydraulic torque sensor, and also controlled yaw. Two horizontal surfaces controlled fore and aft motion (pitch). In addition the propeller provided thrust for forward propulsion.

Its landing gear had mainwheels on cantilever legs and a tailheel mounted on the propeller shroud.

The Norélic made its first flight on 17 November 1947. Flight suggests the helicopter continued to be tested through 1949 and that its control system worked well, though it was damaged in two accidents, after which development ended. Thus the intended production machines, with more refined cockpit glazing, faired rotor gear and incorporating lessons learned from the prototype, never appeared. Instead Bruel designed a smaller, lighter, less powerful, single seat machine, the Nord 1710 which shared a similar control system, though horizontal surfaces were added within the shroud for pitch control. This first flew in July 1950 but just a year later was itself abandoned after accidents.

== Specifications ==
Data from Flight, 8 April 1948, p.393 (estimated performance) and Flight, 9 March 1950, pp.310-1

General characteristics

- Crew: Two
- Length: 7.0 m (23 ft 0 in)
- Height: 3.30 m (10 ft 10 in)
- Empty weight: 510 kg (1,124 lb)
- Max takeoff weight: 948 kg (2,090 lb)
- Powerplant: 1 × Mathis GR7 radial, 120 kW (160 hp)
- Main rotor diameter: 10.00 m (32 ft 10 in)

Performance

- Maximum speed: 185 km/h (115 mph, 100 kn)
- Cruise speed: 155 km/h (96 mph, 84 kn) at 75% power
- Range: 400 km (250 mi, 220 nmi)
- Service ceiling: 3,000 m (9,842 ft) ;hover ceiling 1,524 m (5,000 ft)
- Rate of climb: 5.36 m/s (1,056 ft/min)
