= Nord CT41 =

French supersonic target drone

CT41 PQM-56
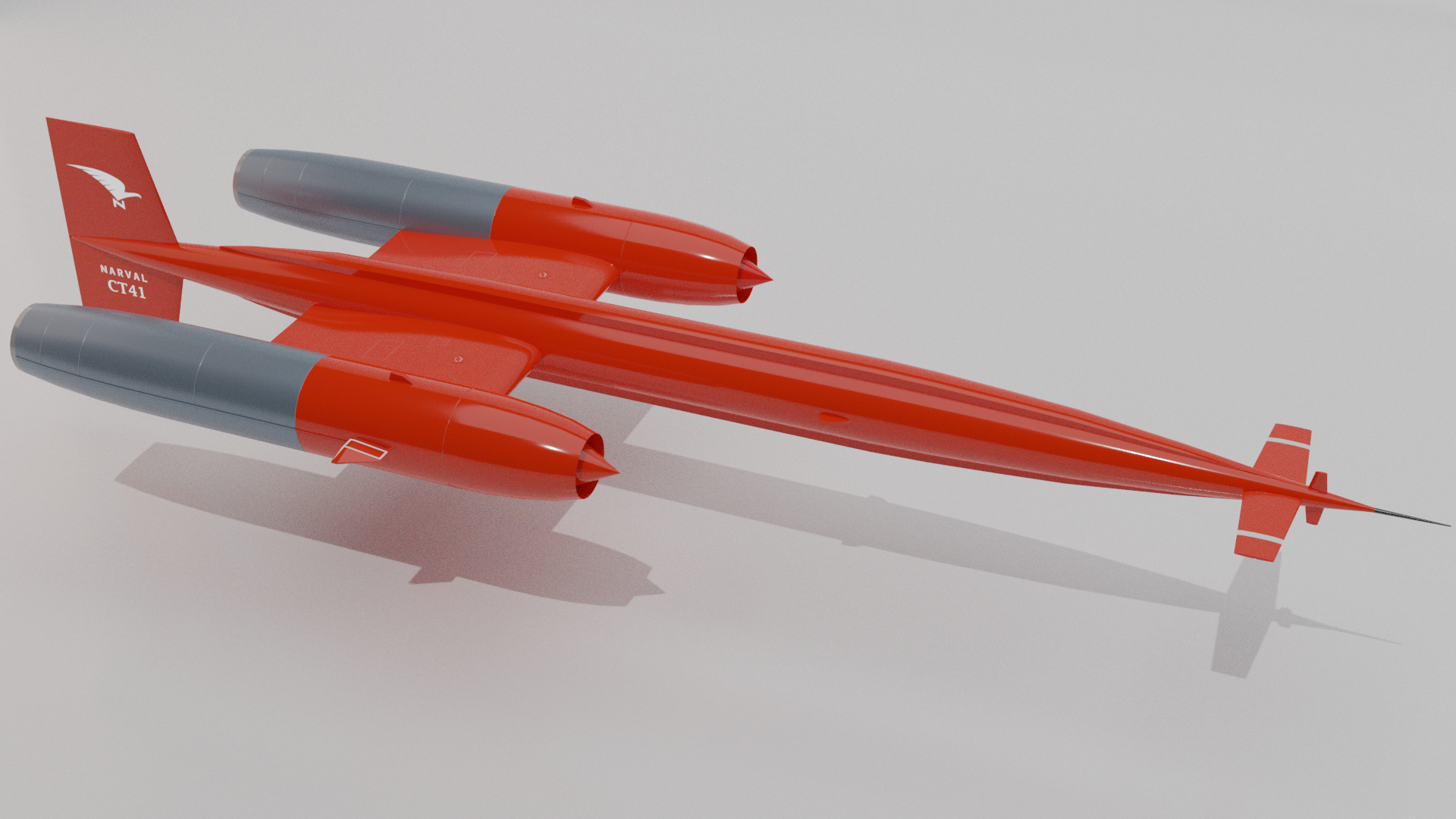

General information
- Type: Target drone
- National origin: France
- Manufacturer: Nord Aviation
- Primary users: French Air Force United States Navy
- Number built: 62

History
- Introduction date: 1960
- First flight: c.1959
- Retired: 1971 (U.S. Navy)

The Nord CT.41 Narwhal was a French target drone, designed and built by Nord Aviation during the late 1950s for the purpose of providing training in the interception of supersonic bomber aircraft.

== Design and development ==
Starting development in 1957, the CT.41 used a canard configuration, with a short, straight wing located at mid-fuselage with wingtip-mounted ramjet engines. Launched using an elevating ramp, two solid rocket boosters provided initial thrust upon launch, with the ramjets igniting at a speed of Mach 1.7. Command guidance was used for control; the aircraft could be fitted with electronic enhancers and flares to boost its target signature. Two types were produced, the CT.41A for high-altitude use, and the CT.41B for low-altitude training. If the drone was not shot down, recovery was via parachute.

== Operational history ==
The CT.41 began test flights during 1959, with production starting later that year; 62 aircraft were constructed for use by the French Air Force. They had only a brief service life before being retired due to being too fast to provide practical training for interceptor pilots. Hawker Siddeley acquired a manufacturing license for the type in November 1960. Six were acquired by Bell Aircraft for evaluation by the United States Navy; Bell also acquired a production license for the type, which in 1962 received the U.S. designation PQM-56A. The PQM-56A was out of service by the early 1970s.

== Specifications ==
Data from Directory of U.S. Military Rockets and Missiles (2003)

General characteristics

- Crew: None
- Length: 9.80 m (32 ft 2 in)
- Wingspan: 3.73 m (12 ft 3 in)
- Height: 2.18 m (7 ft 2 in)
- Gross weight: 1,297 kg (2,860 lb)
- Max takeoff weight: 2,550 kg (5,622 lb) with boosters
- Powerplant: 2 × Type 625 ramjet

Performance

- Maximum speed: Mach 3.1
- Endurance: 14 minutes
- Service ceiling: 20,000 m (65,000 ft)
