= Nord Norécrin =

1200 Norécrin
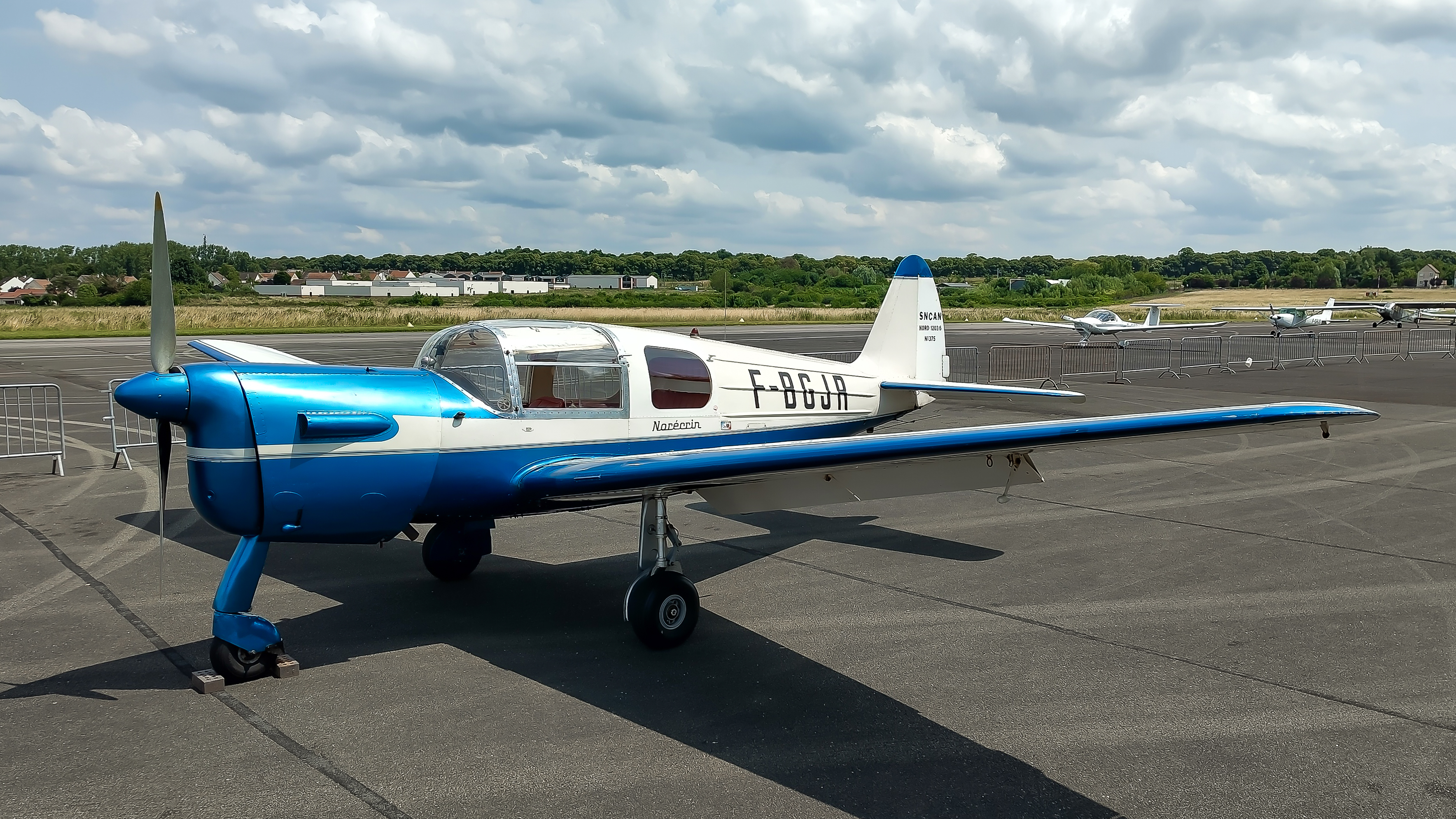
- Nord 1203 Norécrin

General information
- Type: Cabin monoplane
- Manufacturer: Nord Aviation
- Number built: 378

History
- First flight: 15 December 1945

The Nord 1200 Norécrin is a French two or three-seat (later four-seat) cabin monoplane designed and built by Nord Aviation.

== Development ==
The Norécrin was developed to meet a French ministry of transport sponsored design competition. The Norécrin is a low-wing cantilever monoplane with a retractable tricycle landing gear and the prototype (Nord 1200) was designed to receive a nose-mounted 75 kW (100 hp) Mathis G4-R piston engine but flew only with a 100 kW (140 hp) Renault 4Pei (first flight on 15 December 1945 with Georges Detre as test pilot). The production version had three-seats and was designated the Nord 1201 Norécrin I. A number of variants were produced with different engines fitted. Later variants had four-seats and the Nord 1203 Norécrin V was a two-seat military variant with machine-guns and rockets. It was a successful design and 378 aircraft were built.

== Variants ==
1200 Norécrin
Prototype with a 100 kW (140 hp) Renault 4Pei engine.
1201 Norécrin I
Three-seat production variant with a 100 kW (140 hp) Renault 4P-01 engine (22 built)
1202 Norécrin
Prototype four-seat variant with a 120 kW (160 hp) Potez 4D-01 engine

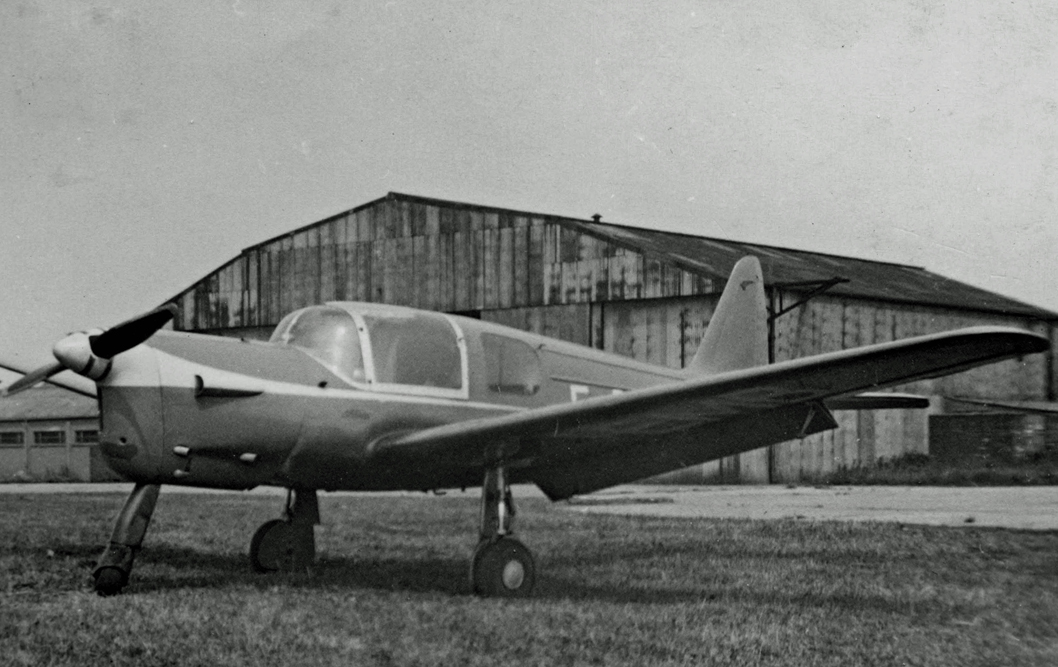
Nord 1203 Norecrin II at Sherburn-in-Elmet airfield, Yorkshire, in July 1951

1203 Norécrin II
Production variant with 101 kW (135 hp) Regnier 4L-00 engine.
1203 Norécrin III
Norécrin II with modified landing gear.
1203 Norécrin IV
Powered by a 130 kW (170 hp) Regnier 4L-02 engine.
1203 Norécrin V
Armed military variant.
1203 Norécrin VI
1955 production variant with a 120 kW (160 hp) Regnier 4L-14 engine.
1203 Norécrin M1
1955 prototype with a 130 kW (180 hp) Lycoming O-360 engine, derated to 120 kW (160 hp) .
1204 Norécrin
Powered by a 93 kW (125 hp) Continental C125 flat-four engine.
1204/II Norécrin
Powered by a 108 kW (145 hp) Continental C145-2 flat-four engine.

== Operators ==
Brazil

- OMTA - One aircraft only.

=== Military operators ===
Argentina

- Argentine Coast Guard

France

- French Air Force
- French Navy

Israel

- Israeli Air Force - Two aircraft only operated 1948–1949.

Switzerland

- Swiss Air Force

== Specifications (1203 Norécrin II) ==
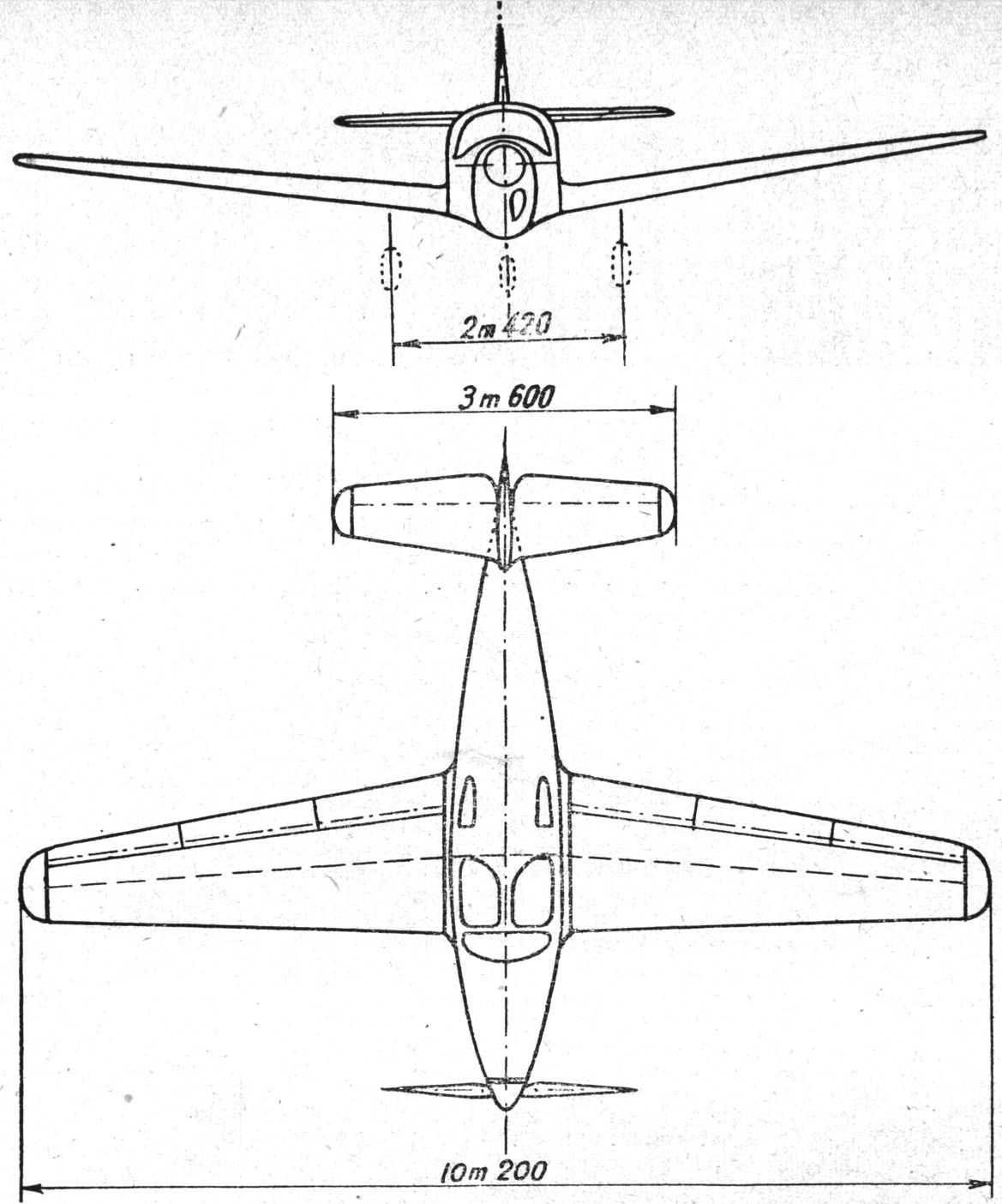
Nord 1200 2-view drawing from L'Aerophile March 1946

Data from The Illustrated Encyclopedia of Aircraft (Part Work 1982-1985). Orbis Publishing. p. 2616.

General characteristics

- Crew: one
- Capacity: three passengers
- Length: 7.21 m (23 ft 8 in)
- Wingspan: 10.22 m (33 ft 6.25 in)
- Height: 2.90 m (9 ft 6 in)
- Wing area: 13 m^{2} (139.93 sq ft)
- Empty weight: 652 kg (1,437 lb)
- Gross weight: 1,050 kg (2,315 lb)
- Powerplant: 1 × Regnier 4L-00 air-cooled inverted inline piston-engine , 101 kW (135 hp)

Performance

- Maximum speed: 280 km/h (174 mph, 151 kn)
- Range: 900 km (559 mi, 486 nmi)
- Service ceiling: 5,000 m (16,405 ft)
