= List of military aircraft of France =

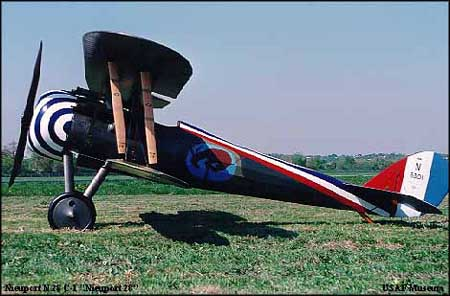
Nieuport 28

France has used many military aircraft both in the French Air and Space Force, and other branches of its armed forces. Multiple aircraft were designed and built in France, but many aircraft from elsewhere, or part of joint ventures have been used as well. Lighter-than-air aircraft such as dirigibles and balloons found use starting in the 19th century used mainly for observation. The advent of World War I saw an explosion in the number France's aircraft, though development slowed after. While having many promising designs in development in the 1930s, government wrangling delayed development enough there was little available at the out break of World War II. The armistice in 1940 marked a low point, with Vichy France being allowed only reduced numbers and development halting. Many French aircraft were captured and used by Nazi Germany and its allies. Some aircraft that did escape served with the Allies or Free French forces, who also used many other types of allied aircraft. The cold-war saw the continued use of many other Western aircraft, mainly from the U.S., during a period of rebuilding of the aviation industry and under threat of war with the Soviet Union. Many new types would come into service including the very successful Mirage series or the latest design, the Rafale.

== To the end of World War I ==
- Blériot XI
- Breguet 4
- Breguet 5
- Breguet 12
- Breguet 14
- Caudron G.III
- Caudron G.IV
- Caudron G.VI
- Caudron R.IV
- Caudron R.XI
- Caudron R.XIV
- Dorand AR-series
- Hanriot HD.1
- Hanriot HD.3
- Farman MF.7
- Farman MF.11
- Farman HF.20
- Farman F.40
- Farman F.50
- Letord Let.1
- Letord Let.7
- Letord Let.9
- Morane-Saulnier H
- Morane-Saulnier L
- Morane-Saulnier LA
- Morane-Saulnier N
- Morane-Saulnier P
- Morane-Saulnier T
- Morane-Saulnier AC
- Morane-Saulnier AI
- Nieuport VI
- Nieuport 10
- Nieuport 11
- Nieuport 12
- Nieuport 14
- Nieuport 16
- Nieuport 17
- Nieuport 21
- Nieuport 23
- Nieuport 24
- Nieuport 24bis
- Nieuport 25
- Nieuport 27
- Nieuport 28
- REP Type N
- Salmson-Moineau S.M.1
- Salmson 2
- Salmson 4
- Sopwith 1½ Strutter
- SPAD S.A.2
- SPAD VII
- SPAD XI
- SPAD XII
- SPAD XIII
- SPAD XVI
- Voisin I
- Voisin III
- Voisin IV
- Voisin V
- Voisin VII
- Voisin VIII
- Voisin X

== World War II ==
See List of aircraft of the French Air Force during World War II

== Rest of the 20th century ==
Type	Origin	Class	Role	Introduced	Retired	Total	Notes
Aircraft
Amiot AAC.1	Germany						
AAB.1	Germany						
Aérospatiale Dauphin							
Aérospatiale TB-30 Epsilon							
Aérospatiale Super Frelon							
Avro Anson	United Kingdom						
Agusta-Bell 47	United States						
Airbus A310							
Airbus A319							
Airbus A340							
Beechcraft T-34 Mentor	United States						
Bell 47	United States						
Bell P-39N/Q	United States						
Bell P-63C	United States						
Boeing C-135F	United States						
Boeing E-3F Sentry	United States						
Bréguet 941S	France						
Bréguet Alizé	France						
Bréguet Atlantique	France						
CASA Aviocar							
CASA CN-235M							
Cessna 310	United States						
Cessna 411	United States						
Cessna F406 Caravan II	United States						
Cessna O-1 Bird Dog	United States						
Dassault Étendard	France						
Dassault Super Étendard	France						
Dassault Falcon 10	France						
Dassault Falcon 20	France						
Dassault Falcon 50	France						
Dassault Falcon 900	France						
Dassault Flamant	France						
Dassault Mirage 5	France						
Dassault Mirage III	France						
Dassault Mirage IV	France						
Dassault Mirage F1	France						
Dassault Mirage 2000	France						
Dassault Mystère	France						
Dassault Mystère IV	France						
Dassault Super Mystère	France						
Dassault Ouragan	France						
Dassault/Dornier Alpha Jet	France						
de Havilland Canada DHC-6 Twin Otter	United Kingdom						
de Havilland Mosquito	United Kingdom						
de Havilland Vampire FB.5	United Kingdom						
Dewoitine D.520	France						
Douglas A-26 Invader	United States						
Douglas C-47	United States						
Douglas DC-6	United States						
Douglas DC-8	United States						
Douglas AD4 Skyraider	United States						
Douglas SBD/A-24 Dauntless	United States						
Embraer Xingu							
English Electric Canberra	United Kingdom						
Eurocopter Cougar							
Eurocopter Panther							
Fouga Magister	France						
Fouga Zephyr	France						
Gloster Meteor NF.11/T.7	United Kingdom						
Grumman E-2C Hawkeye	United States						
Grumman F6F-5/F6F-5N Hellcat	United States						
Grumman TBF Avenger	United States						
Lockheed T-33	United States						
Lockheed SP-2H Neptune	United States						
Lockheed C-130H Hercules	United States						
Martin P5M Marlin	United States						
Martin B-26 Marauder	United States						
Max Holste Broussard							
Morane-Saulnier Alcyon							
Morane-Saulnier MS.760 Paris							
Mudry CAP 10							
Mudry CAP 20							
Nord Noratlas							
Nord 1101							
Nord 260							
Nord 262							
Nord 3202							
Nord 3400							
North American Aviation F-86K	United States						
North American F-100 Super Sabre	United States						
Piper PA-18 Super Cub							
Piper PA-22 Tri-Pacer							
Piper PA-23 Aztec							
Piper PA-31 Navajo							
Republic P-47 Thunderbolt	United States						
Republic F-84E/G Thunderjet	United States						
Republic F-84F Thunderstreak	United States						
SOCATA TBM-700							
SEPECAT Jaguar							
Sikorsky H-34	United States						
SNCAC NC.900							
Sud Alouette	France						
SNCASE Mistral	United Kingdom						
Sud Aviation Caravelle	France						
Sud Gazelle	France						
Sud Puma	France						
Sud Aviation Vautour	France						
Sud-Ouest Bretagne	France						
Supermarine Spitfire	United Kingdom						
Transall C-160							
Vought F4U Corsair	United States						
Vought F-8E(FN) Crusader	United States						
Westland Lynx	United Kingdom						
Yakovlev Yak-3	Soviet Union						

== 21st century ==
Aircraft either introduced after 2000 or in service as of 2000.

=== Fixed-wing ===
==== Propeller ====
- Bréguet 1050 Alizé
- Bréguet 1150 Atlantic
- CASA C-212 Aviocar
- CASA/IPTN CN-235
- Cessna 310
- Cessna 411
- Reims-Cessna F406 Caravan II
- Cirrus SR20
- Embraer EMB 121 Xingu
- Embraer EMB 312 Tucano (withdrawn 2009)
- Grob G 120
- Northrop Grumman E-2 Hawkeye
- Lockheed C-130 Hercules
- Mudry CAP 10
- Pilatus PC-7
- Pilatus PC-21 (2017)
- SOCATA TBM
- Socata TB 30 Epsilon
- Transall C-160

==== Jet ====
- Airbus A310
- Airbus A319
- Airbus A340
- Boeing KC-135 Stratotanker
- Boeing E-3 Sentry
- Dassault Falcon 10
- Dassault Falcon 20
- Dassault Falcon 50
- Dassault Falcon 900
- Dassault Mirage IV
- Dassault Mirage 5
- Dassault Mirage F1
- Dassault Mirage 2000
- Dassault Rafale
- Dassault/Dornier Alpha Jet
- SEPECAT Jaguar

=== Helicopters ===
- Aérospatiale Dauphin
- Aérospatiale Gazelle
- Aérospatiale SA 330 Puma
- Aérospatiale SA 321 Super Frelon
- Eurocopter AS532 Cougar
- Eurocopter AS565 Panther
- Sikorsky H-34
- Westland Lynx

== Gallery of the progression of French fighters ==
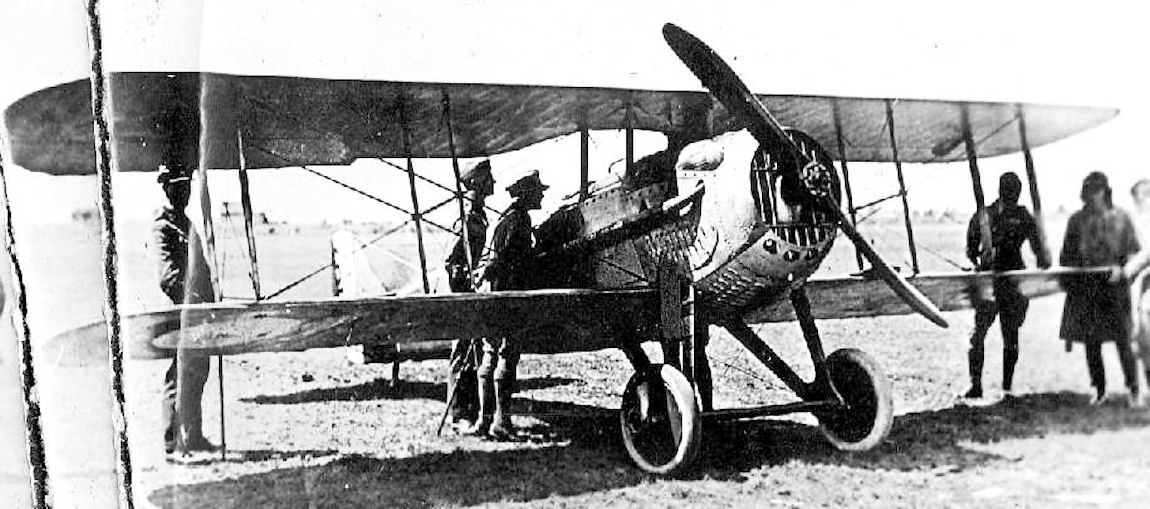
SPAD S.XIII the main French fighter in late World War I.

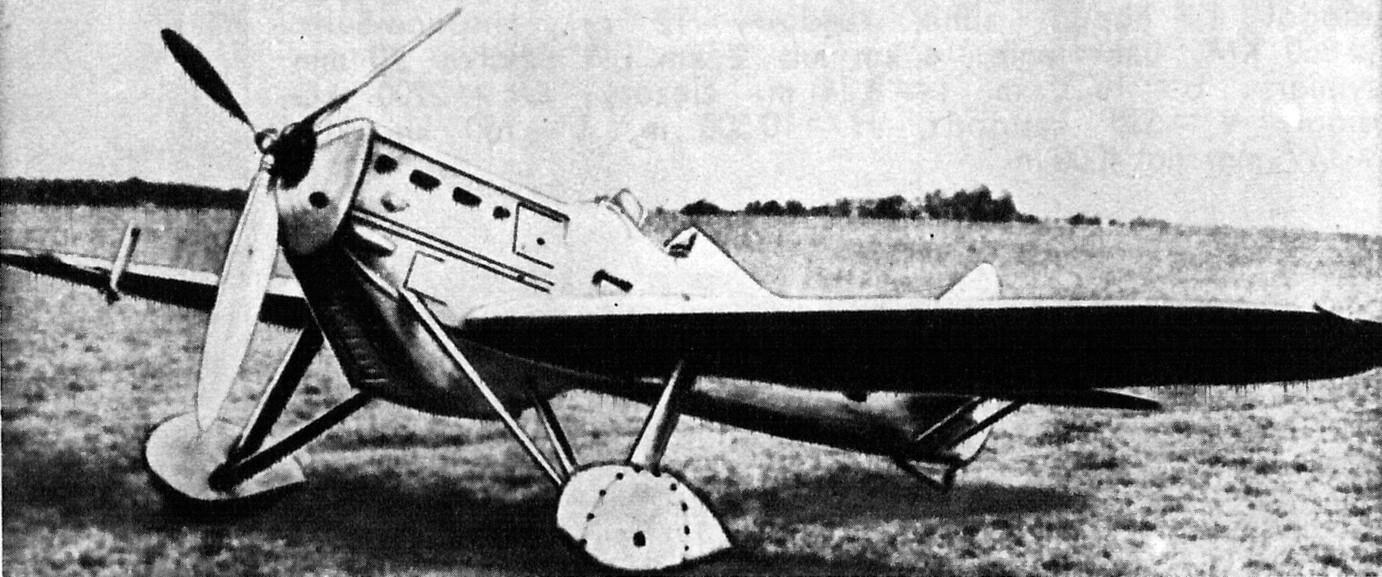
D510 variant of Dewoitine D.500 the main French interwar fighter.

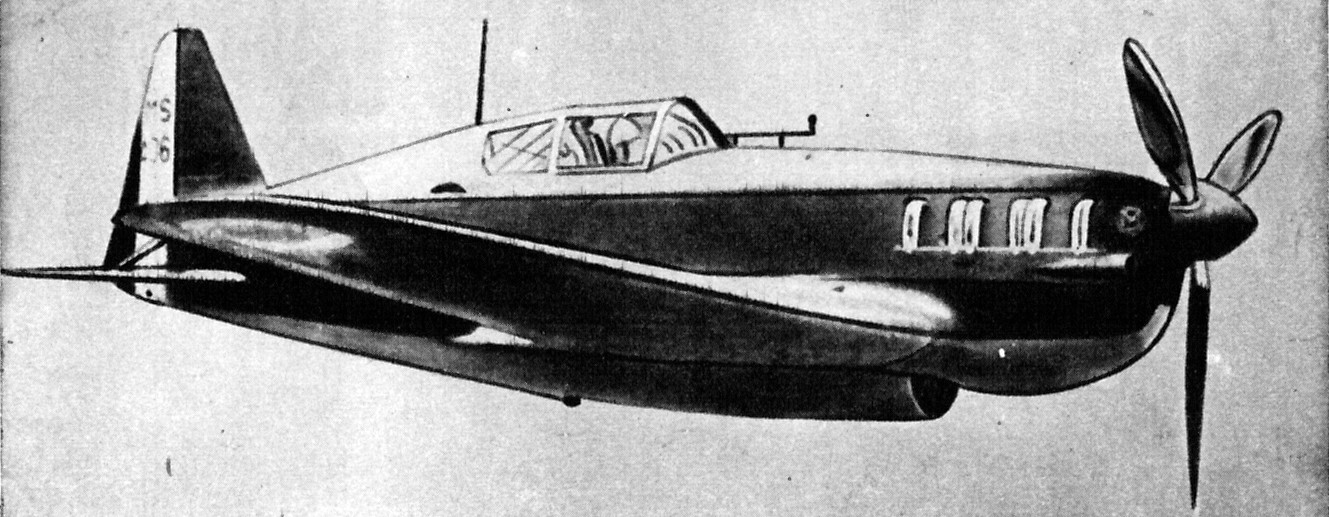
Morane-Saulnier M.S.406 main French fighter during the Battle of France.

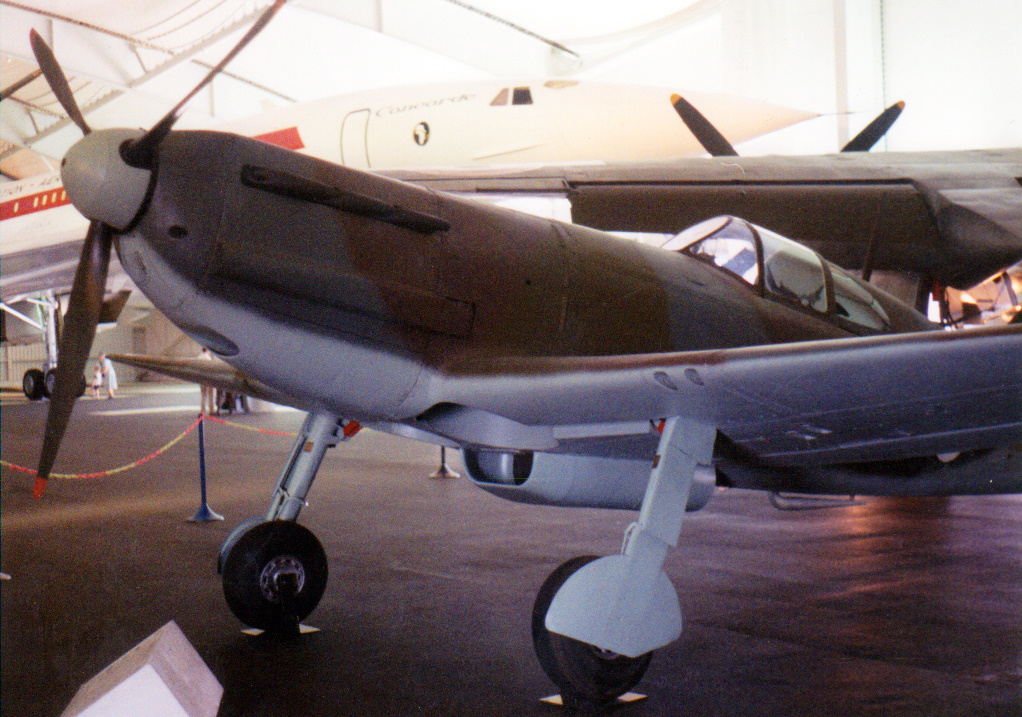
Dewoitine D.520 main fighter of Vichy France which existed during World War II.

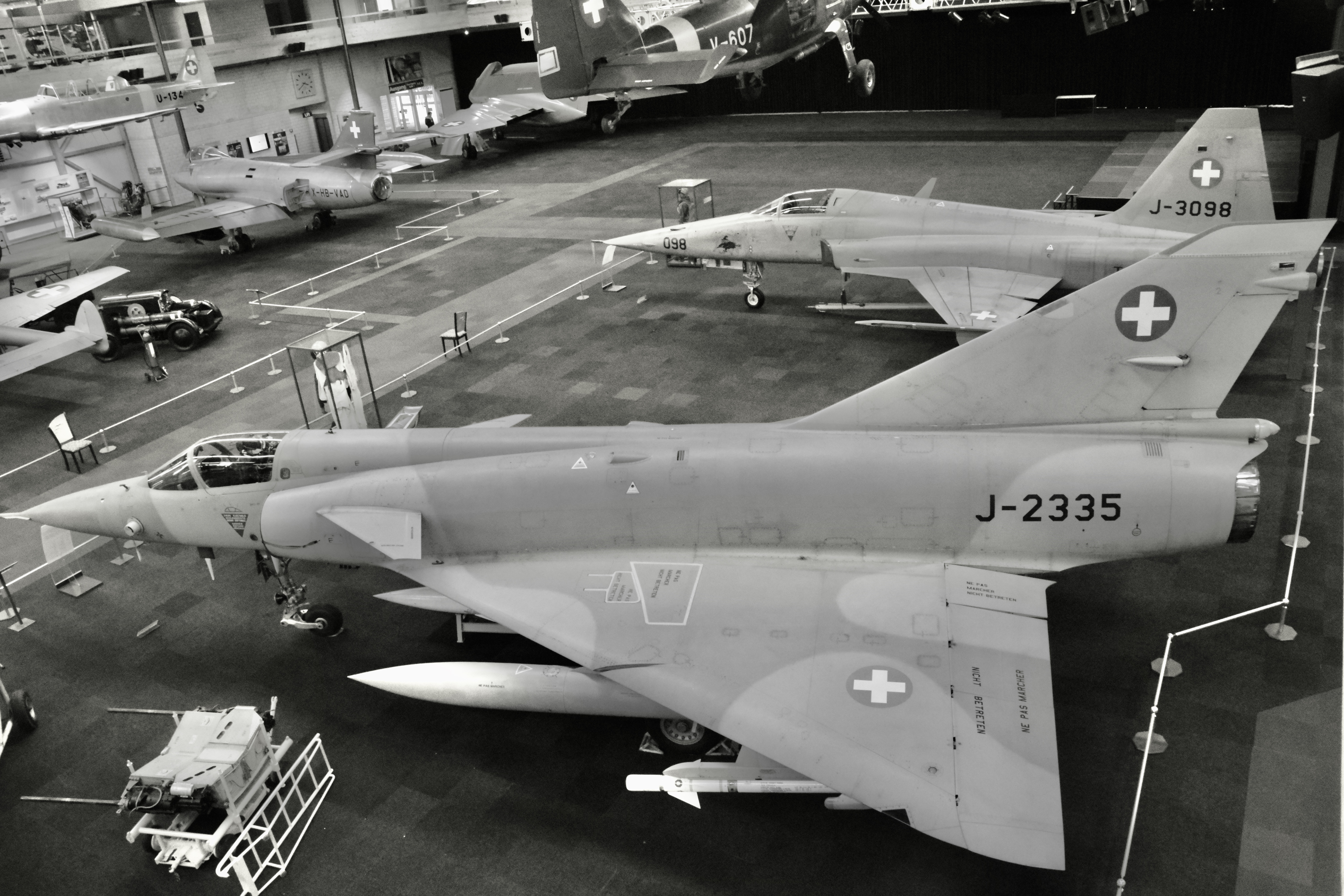
Swiss variant of Dassault Mirage III the main French fighter during the Cold War.

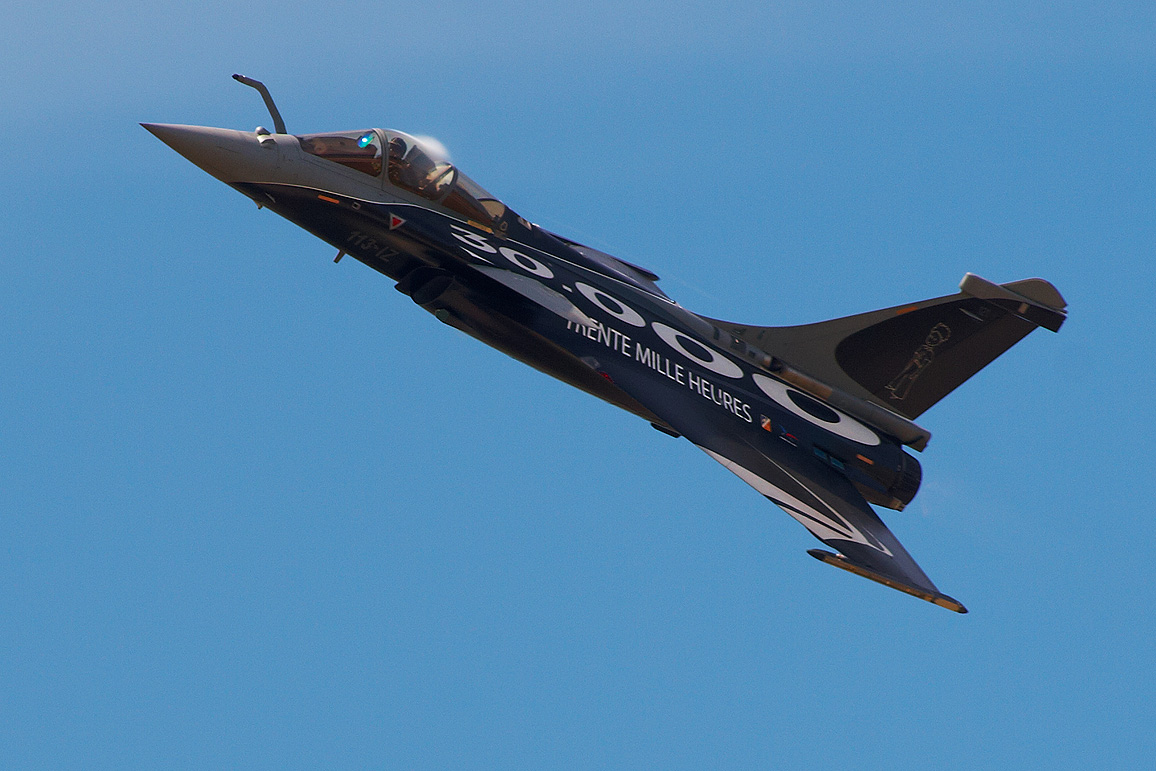
Dassault Rafale current French fighter as of 2023.

== Gallery of the progression of French naval fighters ==
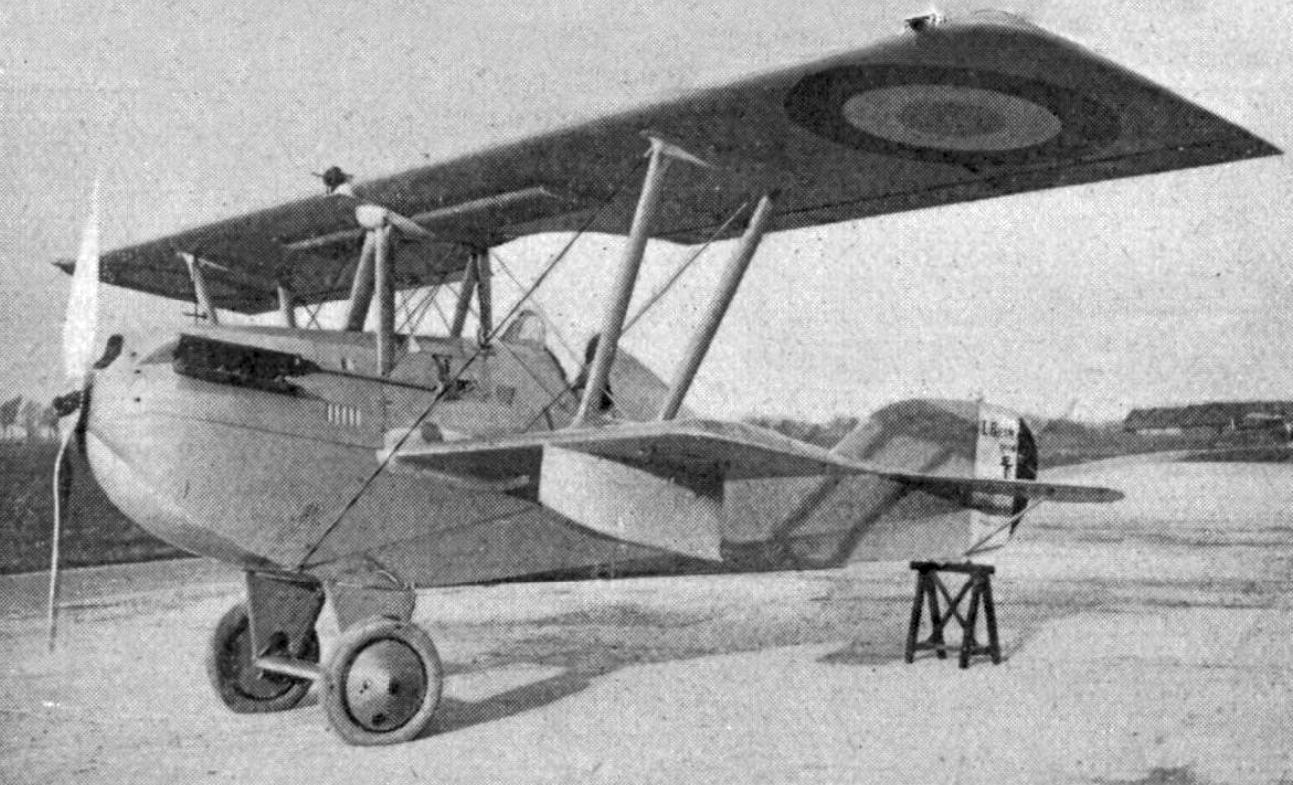
Lévy-Biche LB.2 an interwar naval fighter that was based on Béarn the first French aircraft carrier that came into service in the 1920s.

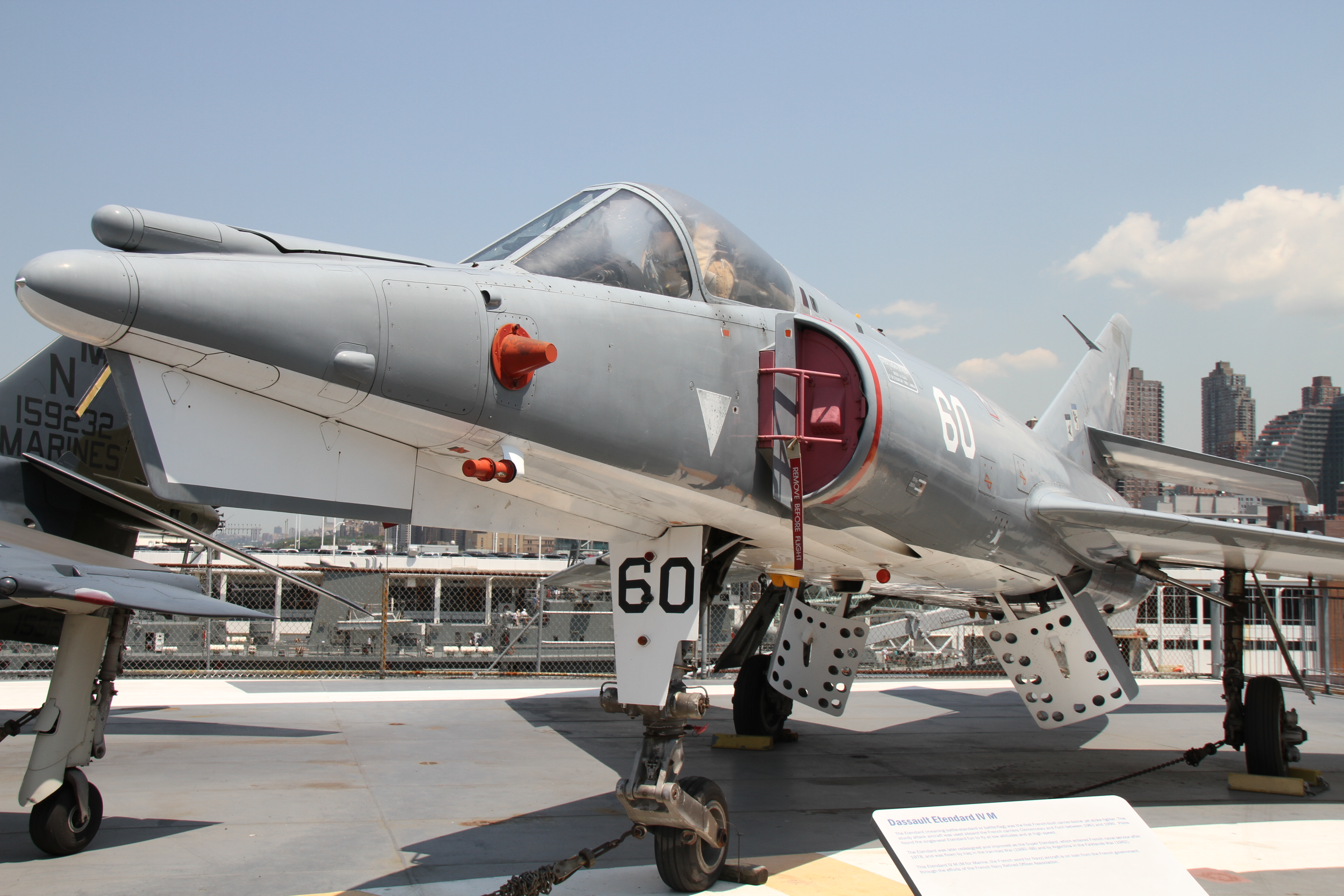
Dassault Étendard IV main French naval fighter of the Cold War.

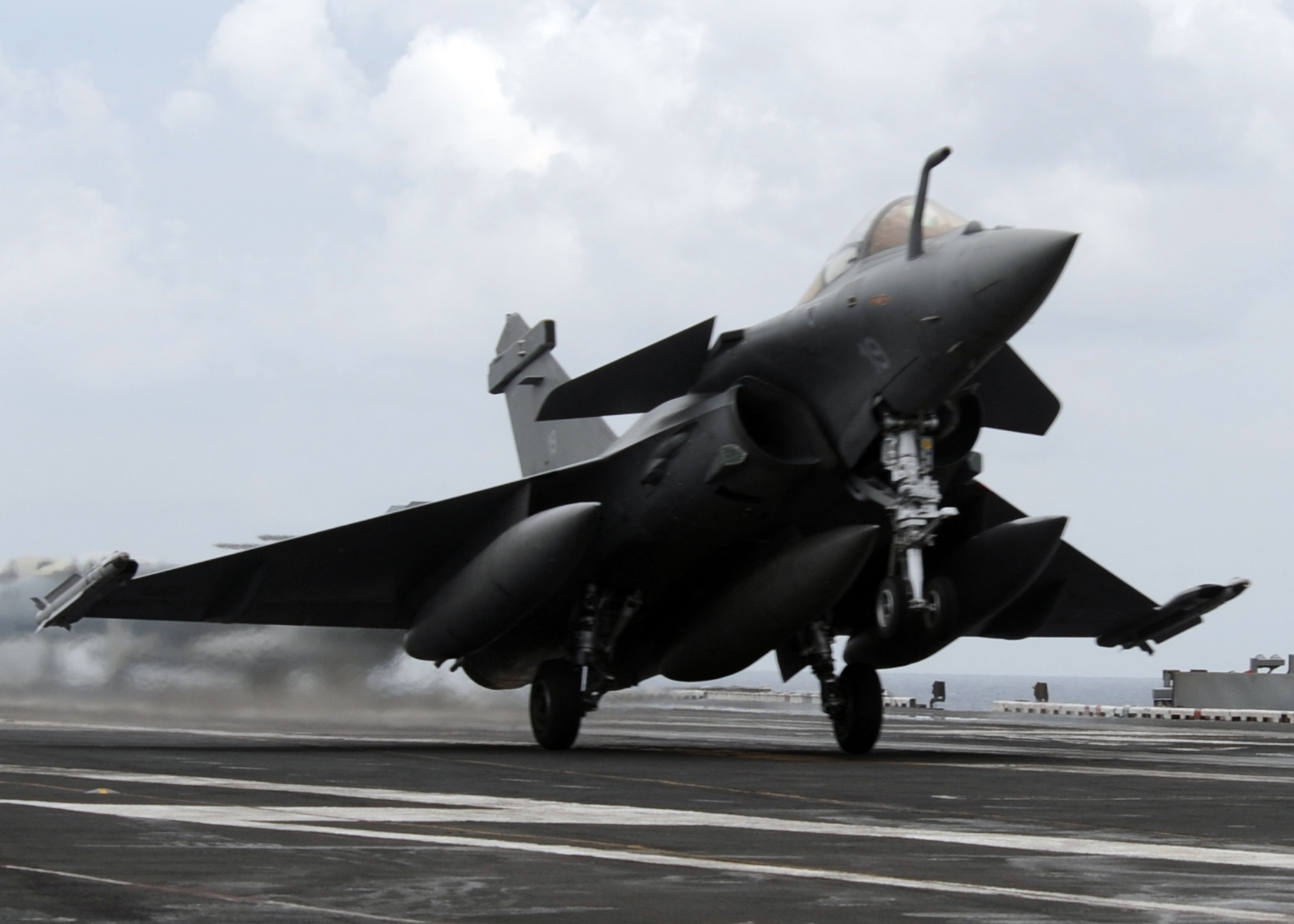
Dassault Rafale M a variant of the Dassault Rafale for use on aircraft carriers. It is currently as of 2023 the only French naval fighter.
