= Cigale =

Cigale is the French word for Cicada. Cigale or Cigales and La Cigale with the French definite article "la" may refer to:

== People ==
- Matej Cigale (1819–1889), Slovene lawyer, linguist and editor

== Places ==
- Cigales, a municipality in Province of Valladolid, Spain
- La Cigale, a famed theater at 120, boulevard de Rochechouart near Place Pigalle, in the 18th arrondissement of Paris
- La Cigale (brasserie), a brasserie located in Nantes, France

== Arts and entertainment ==
- Cigale (ballet), a divertissement-ballet by Jules Massenet.

== See also ==
- Aubert Cigale (English: Cicada), a family of high-wing cabin monoplanes built in France.
- La cigale et la fourmi (English: The Grasshopper and the Ant), a three-act opéra comique.
