= Boisavia Anjou =

Prototype twin-engine light aircraft

B.260 Anjou

General information
- Type: Civil utility aircraft
- Manufacturer: Boisavia, SIPA
- Number built: 1

History
- First flight: 2 June 1956

The Boisavia B.260 Anjou (later developed by SIPA as the Sipavia Anjou) was a four-seat twin-engine light aircraft developed in France in the 1950s. It was a low-wing cantilever monoplane of conventional configuration with retractable tricycle undercarriage. Intended by Boisavia as a touring aircraft, it did not find a market and only the single prototype was constructed. At this point, the firm sold the design to SIPA, which modified the design and re-engined it with Lycoming O-360 engines, but found that they could not sell it either. At a time when the twin-engine light plane market was already dominated by all-metal American aircraft, the Anjou's fabric-over-tube construction was something of an anachronism, and all development was soon ceased. Plans to develop a stretched version with three extra seats and Potez 4D engines were also abandoned.

== Variants ==
- B.260 - Boisavia prototype with Regnier 4L engines (1 built)
- S.261 - SIPA conversion with Lycoming O-360 engines (1 converted)
- S.262 - Planned seven-seat version (not built)

== Specifications (B.260) ==
Data from Jane's All the World's Aircraft 1958-59

General characteristics

- Crew: 1
- Capacity: 3 pax
- Length: 7.2 m (23 ft 7 in)
- Wingspan: 13 m (42 ft 8 in)
- Height: 3 m (9 ft 10 in)
- Wing area: 21.5 m^{2} (231 sq ft)
- Aspect ratio: 7.6
- Empty weight: 1,300 kg (2,866 lb)
- Gross weight: 2,000 kg (4,409 lb)
- Fuel capacity: 450 L (118.9 US gal; 99.0 imp gal) in two wing tanks + 2x 100 L (26.4 US gal; 22.0 imp gal) optional wing-tip tanks
- Powerplant: 2 × SNECMA Régnier 4L-02 4-cylinder air-cooled inverted in-line piston engines, 130 kW (170 hp) each

(SNECMA licence-built )

- Propellers: 2-bladed fixed-pitch propellers

Performance

- Maximum speed: 300 km/h (190 mph, 160 kn)
- Cruise speed: 240 km/h (150 mph, 130 kn) (economical)
- Stall speed: 90 km/h (56 mph, 49 kn)
- Range: 1,500 km (930 mi, 810 nmi)
- Service ceiling: 6,800 m (22,300 ft)
- Rate of climb: 6 m/s (1,200 ft/min)

0.833 m/s (3 ft/s) on one engine at 1,500 m (4,900 ft)

- Take-off run: 160 m (520 ft)
- Landing run: 150 m (490 ft)
