= Farman F.500 =

F.500 Monitor
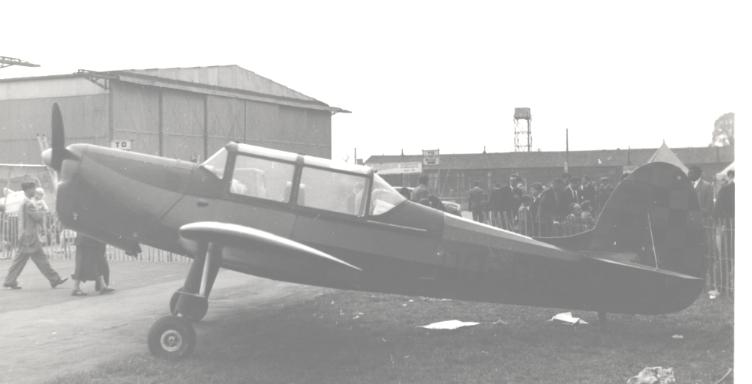
- Stampe & Renard SR.7B Monitor IV OO-SRZ at Coventry Airport, England in July 1956

General information
- Type: Two-seat trainer
- Manufacturer: Societe Anonye des Usines Farman; Stampe et Renard

History
- First flight: 11 July 1952

The Farman F.500 Monitor was a 1950s Franco-Belgian two-seat training aircraft.

== Development ==
Farman had earlier produced the Stampe SV.4 under licence, and with the co-operation of Stampe designed a two-seat training monoplane using SV-4 components designated the Farman F.500. The prototype, named the Monitor I, first flew on 11 July 1952, it was a cantilever low-wing monoplane of mixed construction and conventional tail unit. It had a fixed tailwheel landing gear and room for two crew in tandem under a continuous canopy and was powered by a 140 hp (100 kW) Renault 4Pei engine. The production version designated the Monitor II was placed into production and first flew on 5 August 1955, it had all-metal wings and a Salmson-Argus engine. Production also took place in Belgium with Stampe et Renard under the designation SR.7B Monitor IV.

== Variants ==
F.500 Monitor I
Prototype with a 100 kW (140 hp) Renault 4Pei or Renault 4Po-05 engine, of wooden construction, one built, first flown on 11 July 1952.
F.510 Monitor II
French production aircraft with a 190 kW (260 hp) Salmson 8As-04 engine, metal construction, one built, first flown on 5 August 1955.
F.520 Monitor III
Prototype Monitor I re-engined with a 130 kW (170 hp) Régnier 4L-02 engine, first flown on 15 June 1953.
F.521 Monitor III
with a 130 kW (170 hp) Régnier 4L-22 engine, one built.
SR.7B Monitor IV
Belgian production aircraft.

== Specifications (Monitor II) ==
Data from The Illustrated Encyclopedia of Aircraft (Part Work 1982-1985), 1985, Orbis Publishing, Page 1759

General characteristics

- Crew: Two
- Length: 7.28 m (23 ft 10.5 in)
- Wingspan: 9.44 m (30 ft 11.5 in)
- Height: 2.20 m (7 ft 2.5 in)
- Wing area: 14 m^{2} (150.70 sq ft)
- Gross weight: 802 kg (1,768 lb)
- Powerplant: 1 × Salmson 8As-04 8-cylinder inverted Vee piston engine , 164 kW (220 hp)

Performance

- Maximum speed: 270 km/h (168 mph, 146 kn)
- Endurance: 3 hours 0 minutes

== See also ==
Aircraft of comparable role, configuration, and era

- de Havilland Canada DHC-1 Chipmunk

== Bibliography ==
- The Illustrated Encyclopedia of Aircraft (Part Work 1982–1985), 1985, Orbis Publishing, Page 1759
- Liron, Jean (1984). Les avions Farman. Collection Docavia. Vol. 21. Paris: Éditions Larivière. OCLC 37146471.
