= LACAB GR.8 =

1930s prototype Belgian multi-role combat aircraft

GR.8 Doryphore
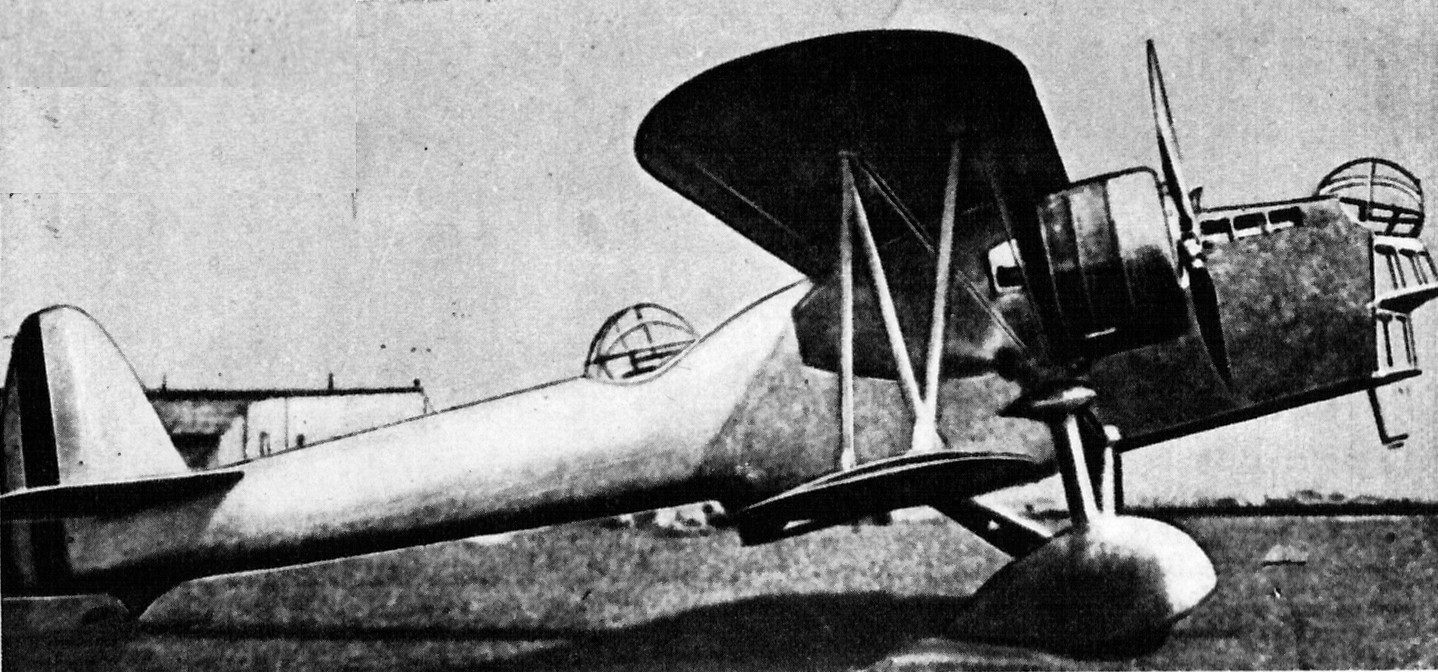

General information
- Type: Bomber/reconnaissance/escort fighter
- National origin: Belgium
- Manufacturer: Les Atelier de Constructions Aéronautiques Belges
- Status: Prototype
- Number built: 1

History
- First flight: 2 June 1936

The LACAB GR.8 Doryphore was a prototype Belgian multi-role combat aircraft of the 1930s. A twin-engined biplane, it was intended to carry out bombing and reconnaissance missions, as well as act as an escort fighter. It was already obsolete when completed and no more were built.

== Development and design ==
In 1934, the Belgian Air Force drew up a specification for a multi-purpose bomber and long-range reconnaissance aircraft, which could also act as a heavy fighter. To meet this requirement, designs were produced by Les Ateliers de Constructions Aéronautiques Belges (LACAB) and by Stampe et Vertongen (the Stampe SV-10).

The LACAB design was a twin-engined biplane of mixed construction, with a slab-sided steel tube fuselage with plywood and fabric covering and wooden, two-bay unequal-span wings. It was powered by two Gnome-Rhône Mistral Major radial engines mounted between the wings, and was fitted with a fixed tailwheel undercarriage.

Manually operated gun turrets, each mounting two machine guns, were mounted in nose and dorsal positions, while two more guns were in a ventral position.

The sole prototype first flew on 14 May 1936 and was handed over to the Belgian Air Force for testing on 2 July 1936. The Spanish Republican Air Force attempted to buy the prototype LACAB GR.8, but the international arms embargo prevented delivery to Spain.

The prototype was badly damaged in a landing accident on 4 April 1938 with its undercarriage and starboard wings destroyed. Although the aircraft was repaired, it was not flown again, and no production was undertaken. The GR.8 was scrapped after the German invasion of Belgium in May 1940.

== Operators ==
Belgium

- Belgian Air Force

== Specifications ==
Data from Plane Facts:The unaesthetic LACAB

General characteristics

- Crew: Three
- Length: 13.45 m (44 ft 2 in)
- Wingspan: 18.00 m (59 ft 1 in)
- Height: 4.15 m (13 ft 7 in)
- Wing area: 65.0 m^{2} (700 sq ft)
- Empty weight: 3,400 kg (7,496 lb)
- Gross weight: 5,200 kg (11,464 lb)
- Powerplant: 2 × Gnome-Rhône 14Kdrs 14-cylinder air-cooled radial engine, 580 kW (780 hp) each

Performance

- Maximum speed: 360 km/h (220 mph, 190 kn)
- Range: 1,000 km (620 mi, 540 nmi)
- Service ceiling: 8,800 m (28,900 ft) (absolute ceiling)
- Time to altitude: 7 min to 4,000 m (13,100 ft)

Armament

- Guns: 6× 7.62 mm machine guns in nose, dorsal and ventral turrets
- Bombs: 800 kg (1,800 lb) bombs
