= PA20 =

PA20 may refer to:

- Aubert PA-20 Cigale, a French prototype light aircraft built in 1938
- Pennsylvania's 20th congressional district
- Piper PA-20 Pacer, an American high-wing light aircraft first built in 1949
- Pitcairn PA-20, an American autogyro of the 1930s
- U.S. Route 20 in Pennsylvania
