= LIBIS KB-6 =

KB-6 Matajur
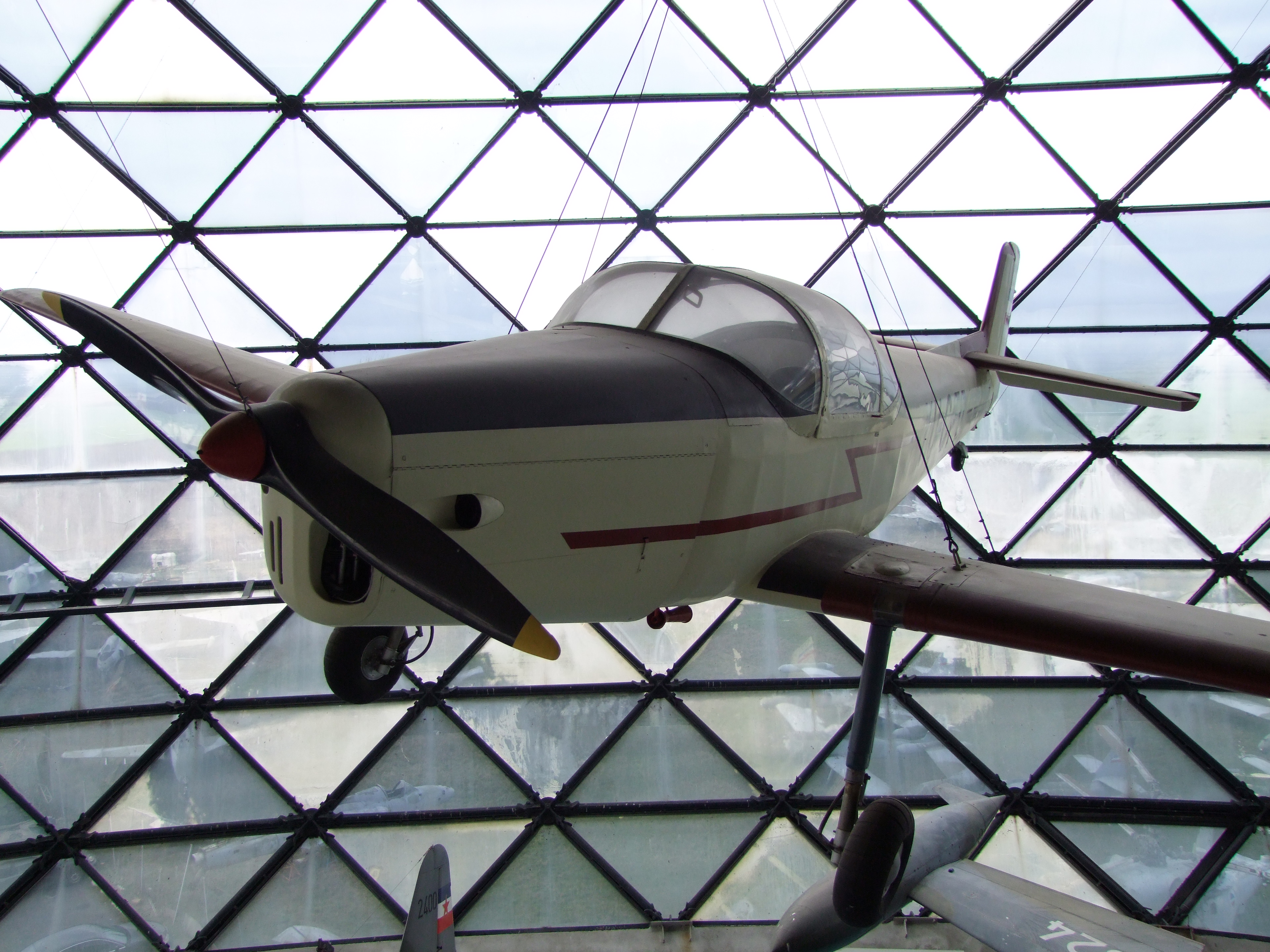

General information
- Type: Two-seat light basic trainer and touring aircraft
- Manufacturer: LIBIS aircraft (Letalski Inštitut Branko Ivanuš Slovenija)
- Designer: Dušan Cener
- Status: Retired
- Primary user: Slovenian aero clubs

History
- First flight: 4 June 1952

The LIBIS KB-6 Matajur was a 1950s Slovenian two-seat light monoplane designed and produced by LIBIS aircraft during Yugoslavian period.

== Design and development ==
The aircraft design office of LIBIS brought together teachers and students of the Ljubljana technical high school. The design office designed the KB-6 Matajur which was a two-seat light trainer and tourer that first flew on 4 June 1952. The KB-6 was a cantilever low-wing monoplane with fixed tailwheel landing gear and an enclosed cockpit with side-by-side seating and dual controls. The aircraft was produced for use in aero-clubs until the mid-1960s.

== Variants ==
KB-6 Matajur
Main production variant, powered by a 135 hp (101 kW) Regnier 4L.00 inline engine.
KB-6T Matajur-Trised
Three-seat development powered by a 160 hp (120 kW) Walter Minor 6-III-J inline engine, eight built.
LIBIS 160
Further developed version of the KB-6T with swept vertical tail, 11 built.

== Specifications (KB-6) ==
Data from Jane's All The World's Aircraft 1953-54

General characteristics

- Crew: 2
- Length: 8.36 m (27 ft 5 in)
- Wingspan: 10.60 m (34 ft 9 in)
- Height: 2.15 m (7 ft 1 in)
- Wing area: 14.0 m^{2} (151 sq ft)
- Aspect ratio: 8:1
- Empty weight: 659 kg (1,453 lb)
- Gross weight: 979 kg (2,158 lb)
- Fuel capacity: 141 L (37 US gal; 31 imp gal)
- Powerplant: 1 × Régnier 4L.00 inverted four-cylinder air-cooled inline piston engine, 101 kW (135 hp)
- Propellers: 2-bladed fixed pitch wooden propeller, 1.95 m (6 ft 5 in) diameter

Performance

- Maximum speed: 222 km/h (138 mph, 120 kn) at sea level
- Cruise speed: 200 km/h (120 mph, 110 kn)
- Stall speed: 88 km/h (55 mph, 48 kn) (flaps down)
- Range: 820 km (510 mi, 440 nmi)
- Service ceiling: 4,500 m (14,800 ft)
- Rate of climb: 3.50 m/s (689 ft/min)
