= SNECMA Régnier 4L =

1940s French piston aircraft engine

SNECMA-Régnier 4L
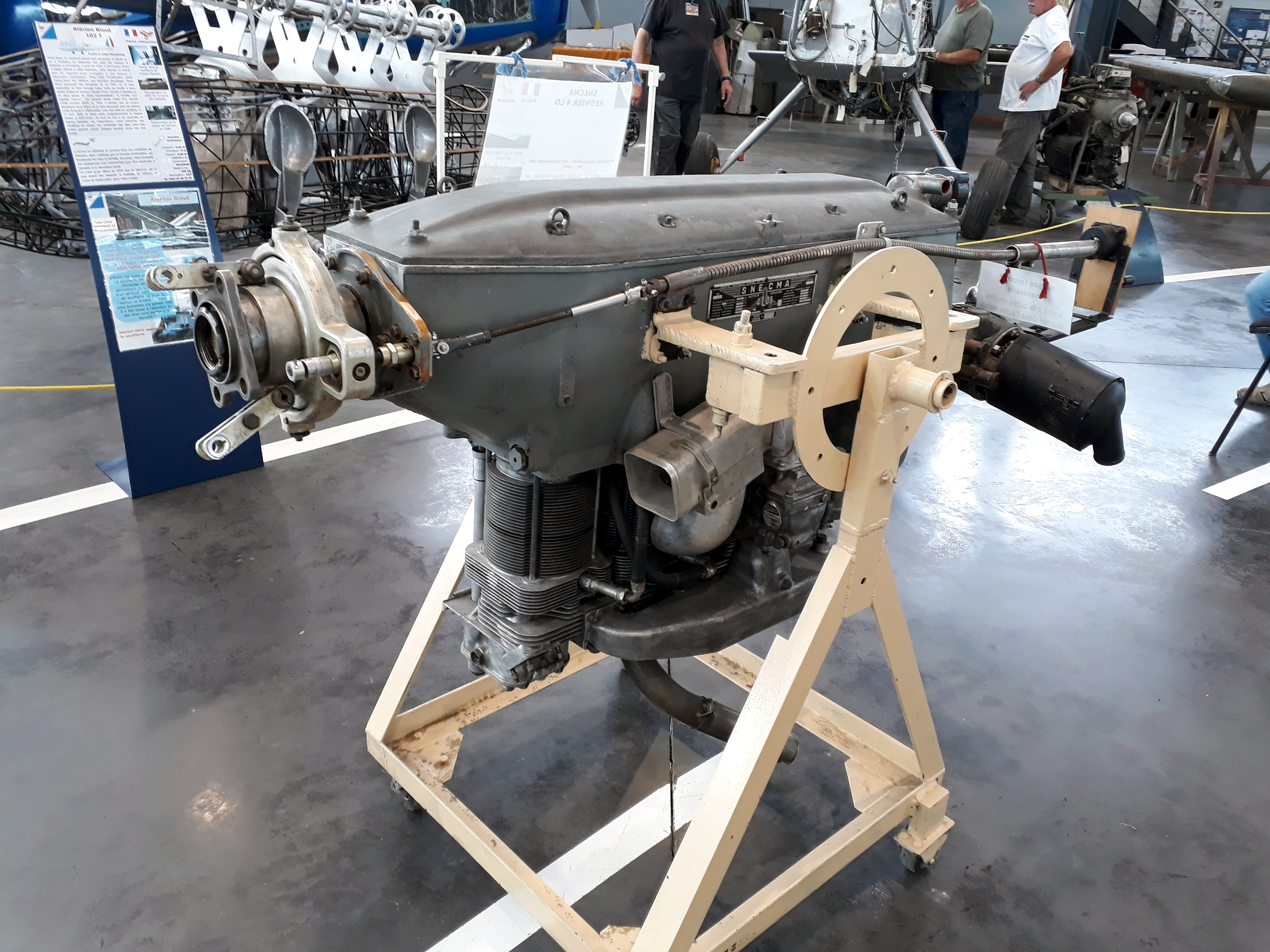
- SNECMA-Régnier 4L08
- Type: 4 cylinder inverted air-cooled in-line
- National origin: France
- Manufacturer: SNECMA
- First run: c. 1945
- Major applications: Nord NC.856A
- Developed from: 1936 R.4

The SNECMA-Régnier 4L is a French four cylinder air-cooled inverted inline piston engine, introduced shortly after the end of World War II.

== Design and development ==
Régnier Motor Company's introduction to aircraft engine production came after acquisition of licences to build the de Havilland Gipsy Major and Gipsy Six. Though they remained influenced by de Havilland practice their products began to diverge and eventually contained original designs. By the mid-1930s they had several four cylinder air-cooled inverted inline engines on offer, including the R.4L-02 displayed at the 1936 Paris Air Show. Though it shared a name with a post-war model, the two engines were very different: the 1936 engine produced 63–67 kW (85–90 hp) from about 4 litres and with a dry weight near 91 kg (200 lb), the later reached 127 kW (170 hp) from 6.3 litres at a weight of 155 kg (342 lb).

During the Occupation of France and in the years shortly after World War II, Régnier designed and produced a set of three simplified four-cylinder inverted air-cooled inline engines of increasing capacity and power, the 4J, 4K and 4L. The specifications of the post-war 4L engine are similar, though not identical to, those of the pre-war R.4, whilst those of the pre-war R.4L specifications are closer to that of the post-war 4K. In 1946 or 1947, Régnier, now nationalised, was absorbed into SNECMA and the 4L engines, the most widely used member of the series, became the SNECMA-Régnier 4L. Notable constructional features, shared with the 4J and 4K engines, included machined steel cylinder barrels with external baked-on anti-corrosion varnish and separate cylinder heads with unusual metallo-plastic seals, held to the crankcase by long bolts. Screwed-in plug bushes and valve seats were made from aluminium-bronze. The 4L's five-bearing steel crankshaft was forged, as were the duralumin connecting rods which had split, steel backed, bronze bearings. The crankcase was cast from aluminium alloy.

SNECMA continued to produce the 4L series until at least 1956. The most prolific type to use it was the military Nord NC.856A, with 112 examples.

== Variants ==
Data from Jane's All the World's Aircraft 1956/57. The types are alternatively written as 4LO-4, etc.

4LO
early post-war designation
4L-00
First post-war version, maximum continuous power 101 kW (135 hp) at 2,280 rpm.
4L-02
Higher compression ratio of 7.25:1, maximum take-off and continuous power 127 kW (170 hp) at 2,500 rpm.
4L-04
As 4L.00 but rearranged accessories.
4L-06
As 4L.02 but rearranged accessories.
4L-08
As 4L.04 but with higher compression ratio of 6.8:1, maximum take-off and continuous power 119 kW (160 hp).
4L-14
4L-20
-00 for inverted flight
4L-22
-02 for inverted flight
4L-24
-04 for inverted flight
4L-26
-06 for inverted flight
4L-28
-08 for inverted flight
4L-34
-14 for inverted flight

== Applications ==
Data from: Gaillard (1990)

- Aubert PA-20 Cigale Major
- Boisavia Anjou
- Boisavia Mercurey
- Brochet MB.110
- Farman F.520 & 521
- Guerchais-Roche T.35
- Leduc RL.21
- LIBIS KB-6
- Nord Norécrin
- Nord Norélan
- Nord 3202
- Nord NC.856A, H & N
- SNCASE SE-2311

== Specifications (Régnier 4L.00 ) ==
Data from Jane's All the World's Aircraft 1956-57.

=== General characteristics ===
- Type: Four cylinder in-line inverted air-cooled piston engine
- Bore: 120 mm (4.72 in)
- Stroke: 140 mm (5.51 in)
- Displacement: 6.3 L (384 cu in)
- Length: 1,366 mm (53.78 in) over starter
- Width: 500 mm (19.69 in)
- Height: 760 mm (29.92 in)
- Dry weight: 155 kg (342 lb) dry

=== Components ===
- Valvetrain: 1 inlet and 1 exhaust valve under each cylinder head, operated via tappets and push-rods from camshaft.
- Fuel system: Zenith 1DC carburettor on port side, fed by 2 Guyot K or O pumps.2 BG plugs/cylinder, BG dual magneto
- Oil system: Pressure lubrication from engine driven pump; 2 scavenge pumps.
- Cooling system: Air; finned cylinder heads

=== Performance ===
- Power output: Maximum continuous 101 kW (135 hp) at 2,280 rpm; take-off 110 kW (147 hp) at 2,340 rpm
- Compression ratio: 6.2:1
- Fuel consumption: 35 L (8 imp gal; 9 US gal) per hour at maximum cruising power (87 kW (116 hp) at 2,160 rpm)

== See also ==
Related lists

- List of aircraft engines
