= Nord 3400 =

1950s French military aircraft

Nord 3400 Norbarbe
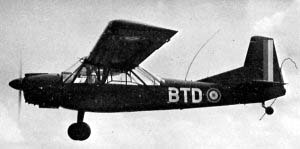

General information
- Type: Two-seat army liaison
- National origin: France
- Manufacturer: Nord Aviation
- Primary user: French Army Light Aviation
- Number built: 152

History
- Manufactured: 1959-1961
- Introduction date: 1959
- First flight: 1958

The Nord 3400 Norbarbe was a French two-seat observation and casualty-evacuation aircraft built by Nord Aviation for the French Army Light Aviation.

== Design and development ==
The Nord 3400 was designed to meet a French Army requirement for a two-seat observation aircraft, with a secondary casualty-evacuation role. The 3400 was a braced high-wing monoplane with a fixed tailwheel landing gear and an enclosed cabin with tandem seating for a pilot and observer. The prototype F-MBTD first flew on 20 January 1958, powered by a 179 kW (240 hp) Potez 4D-30 engine. A second prototype with an increased wing area followed, being powered by a 194 kW (260 hp) Potez 4D-34 engine. A production batch of 150 was ordered by the French Army in the same configuration as the second prototype.

== Variants ==
Nord 3400-01
First prototype, powered by a 179 kW (240 hp) Potez 4D-30 engine, with, 12.7 m (42 ft) span/19.5 m^{2} (210 sq ft) area, wings.
Nord 3400
Production aircraft (and 2nd prototype), with a more powerful 194 kW (260 hp) Potez 4D-34 engine and increased span/area wings.

== Operators ==
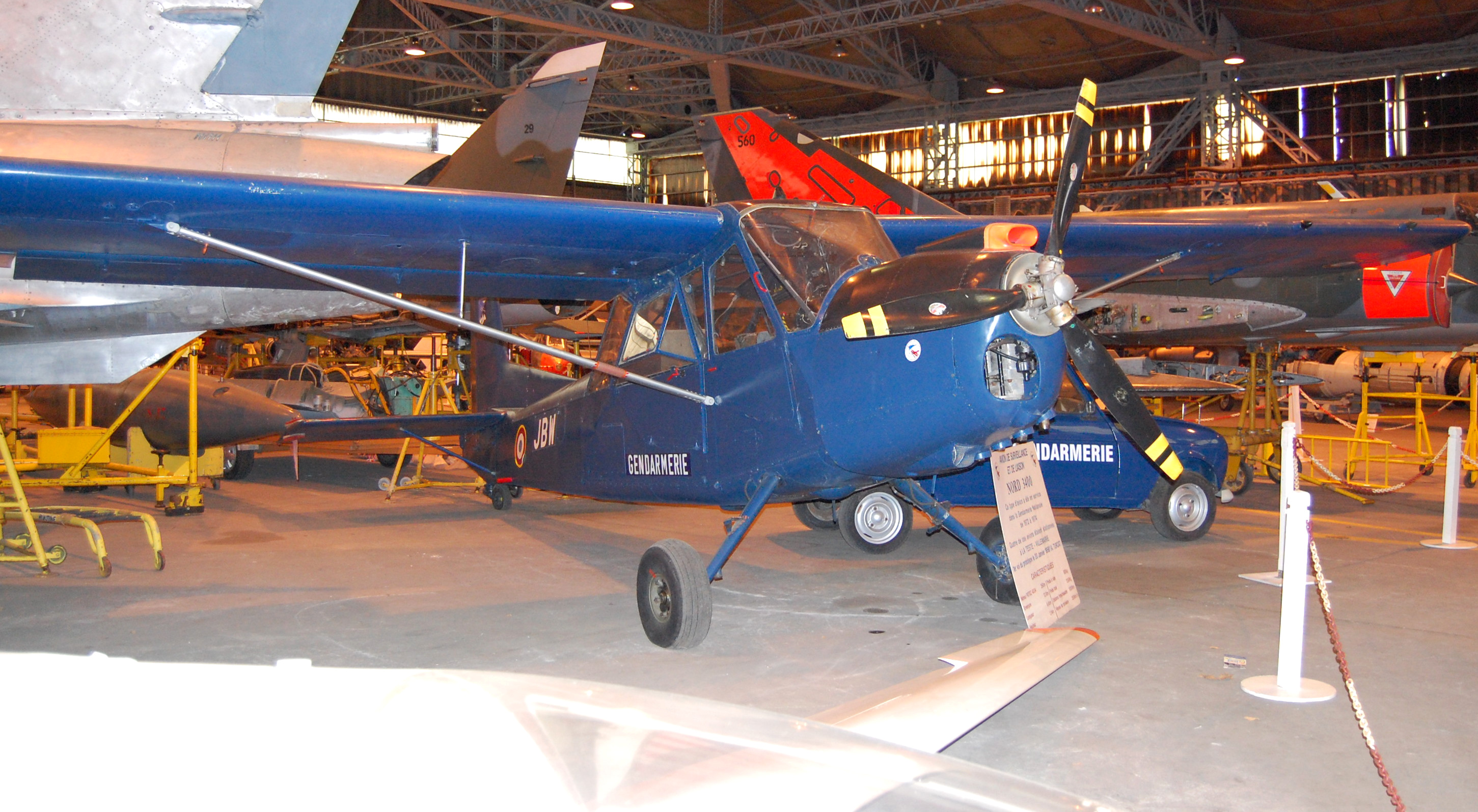
One Nord 3400 of the French Gendarmerie

France

- French Army Light Aviation
- National Gendarmerie

== Specifications (Nord 3400) ==
Data from Jane's All the World's Aircraft 1962-63

General characteristics

- Crew: 2
- Length: 8.42 m (27 ft 7 in)
- Wingspan: 13.11 m (43 ft 0 in)
- Height: 3.1 m (10 ft 2 in)
- Wing area: 20.82 m^{2} (224.1 sq ft)
- Aspect ratio: 8.2
- Airfoil: NACA 23015
- Empty weight: 920 kg (2,028 lb) equipped
- Max takeoff weight: 1,350 kg (2,976 lb)
- Fuel capacity: 220 L (58.1 US gal; 48.4 imp gal) in two self-sealing rubber tanks (160 kg (353 lb))
- Powerplant: 1 × Potez 4D-30 4-cylinder air-cooled inverted in-line piston engine, 180 kW (240 hp)
- Propellers: 2-bladed Ratier Type 24-56 adjustable-pitch propeller, 2.25 m (7 ft 5 in) diameter adjustable-pitch propeller

Performance

- Maximum speed: 235 km/h (146 mph, 127 kn)
- Cruise speed: 200 km/h (120 mph, 110 kn)
- Stall speed: 70 km/h (43 mph, 38 kn) <
- Range: 1,000 km (620 mi, 540 nmi)
- Rate of climb: 7 m/s (1,400 ft/min)
- Wing loading: 65 kg/m^{2} (13 lb/sq ft)
- Power/mass: 0.192 kW/kg (0.117 hp/lb)
- Take-off run: <100 m (328 ft)
- Landing run: <100 m (328 ft)

== See also ==
Related lists

- List of military aircraft of France
