= Morane-Saulnier MS-700 Pétrel =

French four-seat cabin-monoplane

MS-700 Pétrel

General information
- Type: Twin-engined liaison transport
- National origin: France
- Manufacturer: Morane-Saulnier
- Number built: 3

History
- First flight: 8 January 1949

The Morane-Saulnier MS-700 Pétrel (English: Petrel) was a French four-seat cabin-monoplane designed and built by Morane-Saulnier, only three prototypes were built.

== Design and development ==
The MS-700 was a twin-engined, low-wing, cabin-monoplane with a retractable tricycle landing gear and powered by two 160 hp (119 kW) Potez 4D-33 four-cylinder, inverted inline piston engines. The prototype, with French test registration F-WFDC, first flew on 8 January 1949. The aircraft was intended as a light liaison aircraft and the second prototype made a demonstration tour of Africa at the end of 1950. The second prototype was re-engined with two Mathis G8-20 engines and re-designated MS-701. On 3 January 1951 a third prototype first flew, it was a MS-703 with a longer fuselage for six-seats and two 179 kW (240 hp) Salmson 8.AS.OO engines. After being used by the company for a number of years the first prototype was due to be modified in the late 1950s to the same standards as the MS-703 but with 220 hp (164 kW) Potez engines but it was not converted and instead was withdrawn from use. Only the three prototypes were built and the type did not enter production.

== Variants ==
MS-700-01
First prototype of the Four-seat MS-700 variant, powered by two 119 kW (160 hp) Potez 4D-33 engines. First flown on 8 January 1949 the MS-700-01 (regn. F-WFDC) was withdrawn from use in June 1959.
MS-700-02
Second prototype of the MS-700 series, powered by two 160 kW (220 hp) Potez 4D-31 engines, converted to MS-701 standard (regn. F-BFDE).
MS-701
Second prototype, MS-700-02, re-engined with two 134 kW (180 hp) Mathis G8-20 engines.
MS-702
No details.
MS-703-01
Six-seat variant powered by two 179 kW (240 hp) Salmson 8.AS.00 / Argus As 10 engines, one built. The MS-703-01 was first flown on 3 January 1951.
MS-704
Proposed modification of the first prototype to MS-703 standard with two 164 kW (220 hp) Potez engines, not converted.

== Specification (MS-700-01) ==
Data from French Postwar Transport Aircraft

General characteristics

- Capacity: four-seats, payload 255 kg (562 lb)
- Length: 9.29 m (30 ft 6 in)
- Wingspan: 14.2 m (46 ft 7 in)
- Height: 3.4 m (11 ft 2 in)
- Wing area: 26.5 m^{2} (285 sq ft)
- Empty weight: 1,645 kg (3,627 lb)
- Gross weight: 2,220 kg (4,894 lb)
- Powerplant: 2 × Potez 4D-33 four-cylinder, inverted inline piston engines, 120 kW (160 hp) each
- Propellers: 2-bladed

Performance

- Maximum speed: 290 km/h (180 mph, 160 kn) at 1,500 m (4,900 ft)
- Cruise speed: 260 km/h (160 mph, 140 kn) at 1,000 m (3,300 ft)
- Range: 1,200 km (750 mi, 650 nmi) with max payload
- Service ceiling: 6,200 m (20,300 ft)
- Wing loading: 83.77 kg/m^{2} (17.16 lb/sq ft)
- Take-off distance: 430 m (1,410 ft) to clear 20 m (66 ft)

== Bibliography ==
- Chillon, Jacques; Dubois, Jean-Pierre & Wegg, John (1980). French Post-War Transport Aircraft. Tonbridge, UK: Air-Britain. ISBN 0-85130-078-2.
