= Aubert Aviation =

French Aircraft Manufacturing Company

Aubert Aviation (later, SA des avions P. Aubert) was a French aircraft manufacturing company established in 1932 by Paul Aubert at Issy-les-Moulineaux. In 1938, it flew a light monoplane, the Cigale, and continued to develop this design after World War II at Buc, building some 30 production examples before ceasing operations in 1959.
