= Leduc RL.21 =

French single engine plane

- RL.21 with (from left) Prosper (engineer), R. Leduc (designer) and R. Davy (pilot)

General information
- Type: Class speed record setter
- National origin: France
- Designer: René Leduc
- Number built: 1

History
- First flight: August 1960

The Leduc RL.21 was a single engine, single seat light aircraft built in the late 1950s in France. Designed to achieve high speeds from modest engine power, it set seven class records in the early 1960s.

== Design and development ==
Between 1939 and 1975 the amateur aircraft designer and builder René Leduc (not the ramjet designer of the same name) completed and flew five different lightplanes, two of which set records in their class. The RL.21 was a low wing monoplane with its wings braced to the upper fuselage by a pair of inverted-V struts. It was powered by a 101 kW (135 hp) SNECMA-Régnier 4L-00 four cylinder inverted air-cooled inline engine driving a two blade propeller. A low, smoothly streamlined canopy covered the single seat cockpit and merged aft into a raised rear fuselage. The empennage was conventional. The RL.21 had a tailwheel undercarriage with spatted main wheels on cantilever legs, mounted on the wings approximately below the ends of the wing struts.

Leduc built the RL.21 over a period of six years with assistance from Sud Aviation and from the Nantes Technical School. It flew for the first time in August 1960. Between late 1960 and early 1967 it set seven records in its C1a and C1b categories, respectively for aircraft with maximum take-off weights below 500 kg (1,102 lb) and between 500–1,000 kg (1,102–2,205 lb). The earliest were for speeds of 313.5 km/h (194.8 mph) and 316.2 km/h (196.5 mph) for the two classes around a 100 km (62 mi) closed circuit and the last at 349.2 km/h (217 mph) and 334.7 km/h (208 mph) over a 500 km (311 mi) closed circuit. Throughout these flights the pilot was Raymond Davy.

== Specifications ==
Data from Gaillard (1990) p.209

General characteristics

- Capacity: One
- Length: 6.90 m (22 ft 8 in)
- Wingspan: 5.70 m (18 ft 8 in)
- Wing area: 6.5 m^{2} (70 sq ft)
- Empty weight: 390 kg (860 lb)
- Max takeoff weight: 500 kg (1,102 lb)
- Powerplant: 1 × SNECMA-Régnier 4L-00 4 cylinder inverted air-cooled inline, 101 kW (135 hp)
- Propellers: 2-bladed

Performance

- Maximum speed: 360 km/h (220 mph, 190 kn)
- Service ceiling: 8,000 m (26,000 ft)
