= Nord 3202 =

1950s French military trainer aircraft

3202
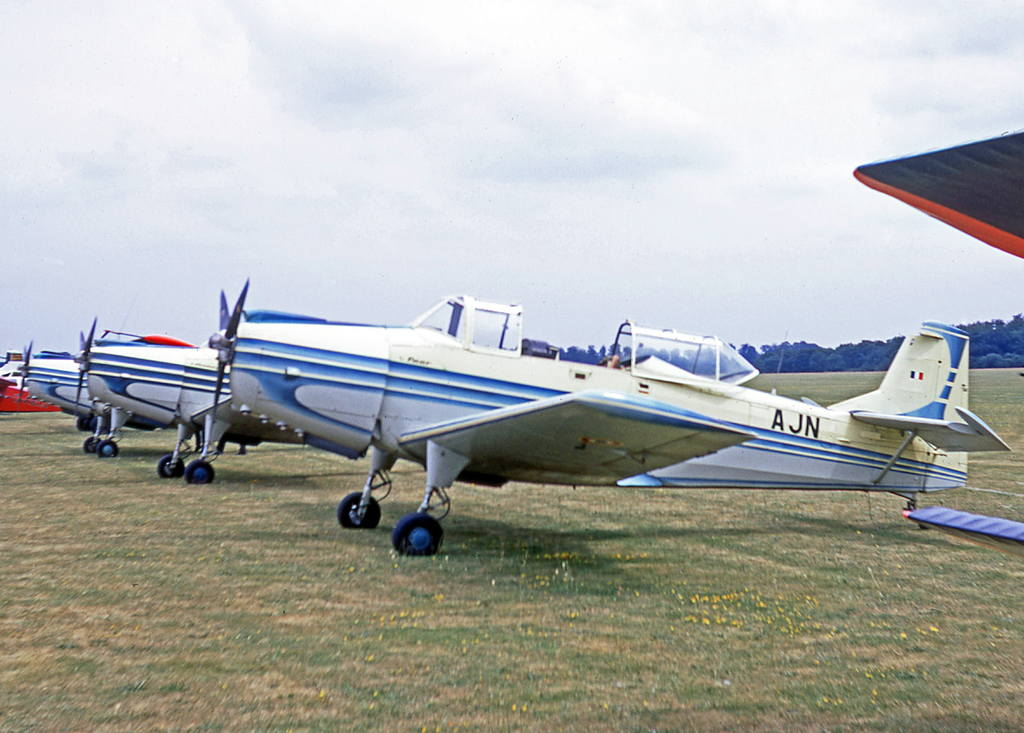
- Three Nord 3202B of the French Army at Middle Wallop Army Air Corps airfield in 1969

General information
- Type: Trainer
- National origin: France
- Manufacturer: Nord
- Primary users: French Army private pilot owners
- Number built: 101

History
- First flight: 17 April 1957

The Nord Aviation 3202 is a 1950s French military trainer aircraft designed and built by Nord Aviation to meet a French Army requirement for a two-seat basic trainer, as a replacement for the biplane Stampe SV.4. Altogether, 101 examples were built, with the first flying on 17 April 1957.

== Design ==
The 3202 was a cantilever low-wing monoplane with a fixed tailwheel landing gear and a nose-mounted inline piston engine. It had an enclosed cockpit for pupil (front) and instructor (rear) in tandem.

== Operation ==
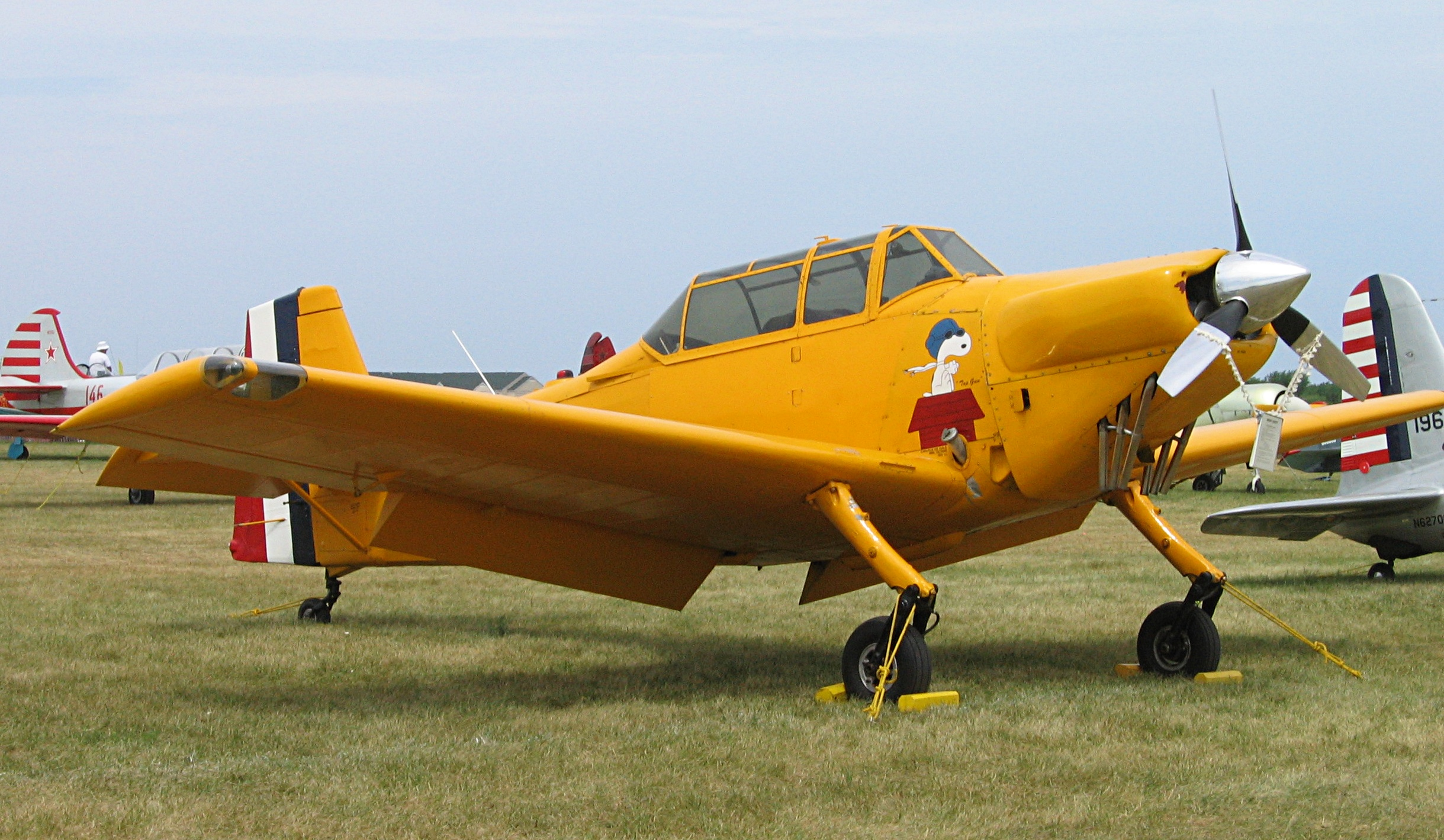
Nord 3202 at Airventure 2006. This example has been re-engined with a Lycoming flat-6.

The Nord 3202 was used as a military training aircraft. After retirement from military use, many examples were sold to the civilian market, including several now (2012) flown in the United States.

== Variants ==
Nord 3200
Prototype with a 240hp (179kW) Salmson 8AS-04 engine.
Nord 3201
Prototype with a 170hp (127kW) Regnier 4L-22 engine.
Nord 3202
Production aircraft with a 179 kW (240 hp) Potez 4D-32 engine, 50 built.
Nord 3202B
Production aircraft with a 194 kW (260 hp) Potez 4D-34 engine, 50 built.
Nord 3202B1B
modified by Aérospatiale for use by the Patrouille de l'Aviation Légère de l'Armée de Terre in aerobatic competitions. Larger ailerons, lower weight, new landing gear, and variable-pitch propeller.
Nord 3212
Redesignation for 3202s fitted with radio compass and equipped for instrument flight training.

== Operators ==
France

- French Army

== Specifications (N 3202) ==
Data from Jane's All The World's Aircraft 1962–63

General characteristics

- Crew: 2
- Length: 8.12 m (26 ft 8 in)
- Wingspan: 9.50 m (31 ft 2 in)
- Height: 2.82 m (9 ft 3 in) in flying attitude
- Wing area: 16.26 m^{2} (175.0 sq ft)
- Empty weight: 824 kg (1,817 lb)
- Gross weight: 1,220 kg (2,690 lb)
- Powerplant: 1 × Potez 4D-32 four-cylinder air-cooled inline engine, 180 kW (240 hp)
- Propellers: 2-bladed Ratier Type 23-92, 2.25 m (7 ft 5 in) diameter adjustable-pitch propeller

Performance

- Maximum speed: 260 km/h (160 mph, 140 kn)
- Cruise speed: 195 km/h (121 mph, 105 kn)
- Stall speed: 83 km/h (52 mph, 45 kn)
- Range: 1,000 km (620 mi, 540 nmi)
- Wing loading: 75 kg/m^{2} (15 lb/sq ft)
- Power/mass: 0.197 kW/kg (0.120 hp/lb)

== See also ==
Aircraft of comparable role, configuration, and era

- de Havilland Chipmunk
- Fokker S-11
