= Potez 4D =

1930s French piston aircraft engine

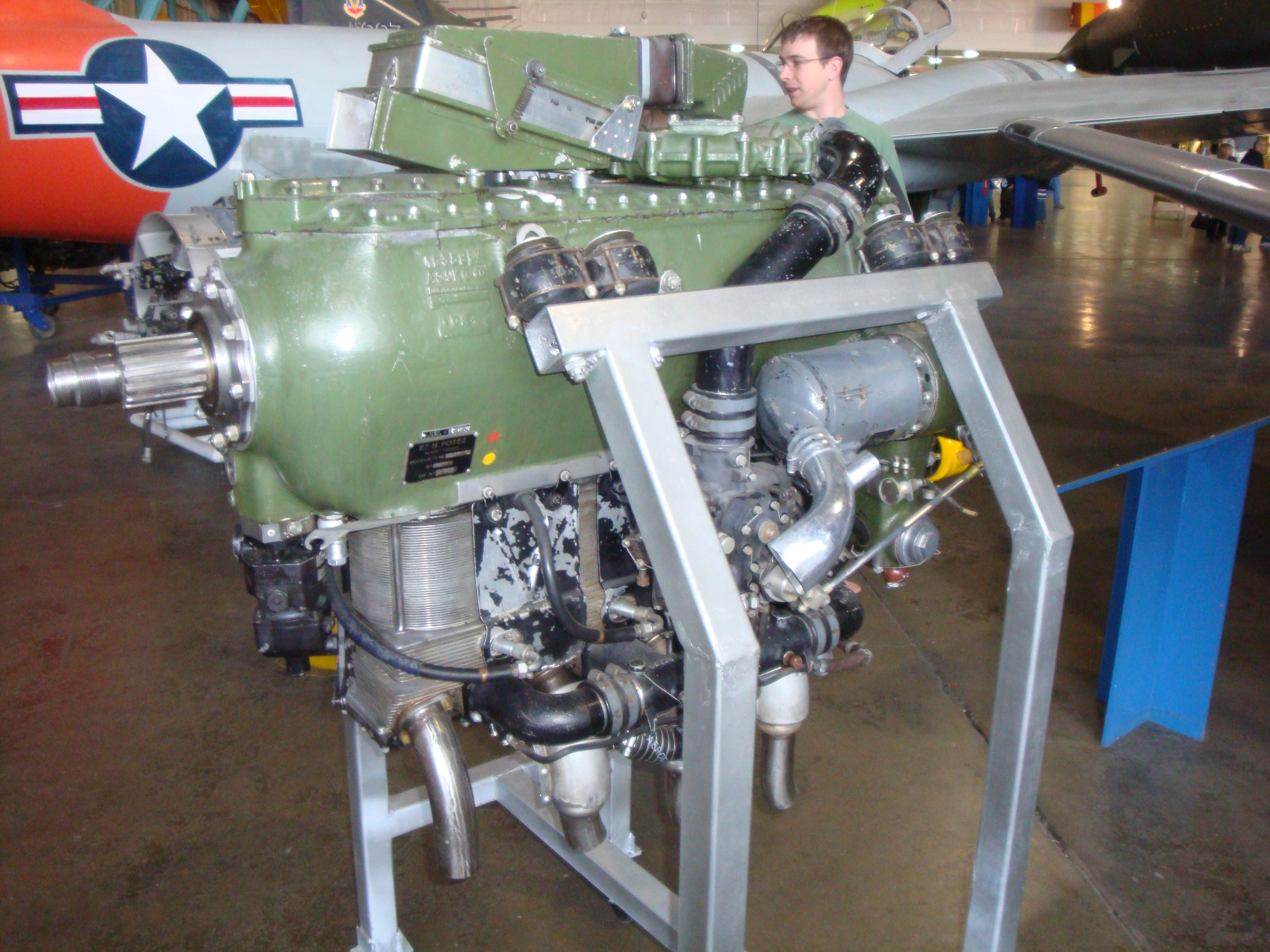
- A Potez 4D on display at the Wings Over the Rockies Air and Space Museum
- Type: 4-cyl. inverted air-cooled piston engine
- National origin: France
- Manufacturer: Société des Avions et Moteurs Henry Potez
- Major applications: Nord 3202

The Potez 4D was a four-cylinder, inverted inline aircraft engine. It was first built shortly before World War II, but did not enter full production until 1949. Like the other D-series engines, the cylinders had a bore of 125 mm (4.9 in) and a stroke of 120 mm (4.7 in). Power for different models was in the 100 kW-190 kW (140 hp-260 hp) range.

== Variants ==
4D-00
127 kW (170 hp)
4D-01
119 kW (160 hp)
4D-30
179 kW (240 hp)
4D-31
164 kW (220 hp)
4D-32
179 kW (240 hp)
4D-33
119 kW (160 hp)
4D-34
194 kW (260 hp)
4D-36
194 kW (260 hp) 4D-34 with aerobatic oil system

== Applications ==
- Morane-Saulnier MS.570
- Morane-Saulnier MS.700 Petrel
- Max Holste MH.52
- Nord 1202 Norécrin
- Nord 3202
- Nord 3400
- SIPA S.70
- S.N.C.A.C. NC-840 Chardonneret

== Specifications (Potez 4-D 01) ==
Data from Jane's All The World's Aircraft 1953-54.

=== General characteristics ===
- Type: Four-cylinder air-cooled inverted inline engine
- Bore: 125 mm (4.92 in)
- Stroke: 120 mm (4.72 in)
- Displacement: 5.85 L (352 in³)
- Length: 1,207.5 mm (47.5 in)
- Width: 510 mm (20.1 in)
- Height: 668.5 mm (26.3 in)
- Dry weight: 143 kg (314.6 lb)

=== Components ===
- Valvetrain: Two valves per cylinder with sodium cooled exhaust valves
- Fuel system: One Zenith carburettor
- Fuel type: 80 octane minimum
- Oil system: Dry sump with one pressure and two scavenge pumps
- Cooling system: air-cooled

=== Performance ===
- Power output: 119 kW (160 hp) at 2,520 rpm (take-off), 97 kW (130 hp) at 2,360 rpm (Max cruise)
- Compression ratio: 7:1
- Specific fuel consumption: 245 gram/hp/hour (take-off)
- Power-to-weight ratio: 0.83 kW/kg (0.51 hp/lb) (take-off)

== See also ==
Comparable engines

- de Havilland Gipsy Major

Related lists

- List of aircraft engines
