= Aérospatiale Dauphin =

Series of helicopters manufactured in France

The Aérospatiale Dauphin is a family of helicopters manufactured by Aérospatiale, and later by Eurocopter. The family includes:

- Aérospatiale SA 360 Dauphin (1) - single engine
- Aérospatiale SA 365 Dauphin 2 - twin engines
- Eurocopter AS365 Dauphin - twin engines
- Eurocopter HH-65 Dolphin - the SA366 G1, a Search and Rescue variant for the United States Coast Guard
