= La Cigale (brasserie) =

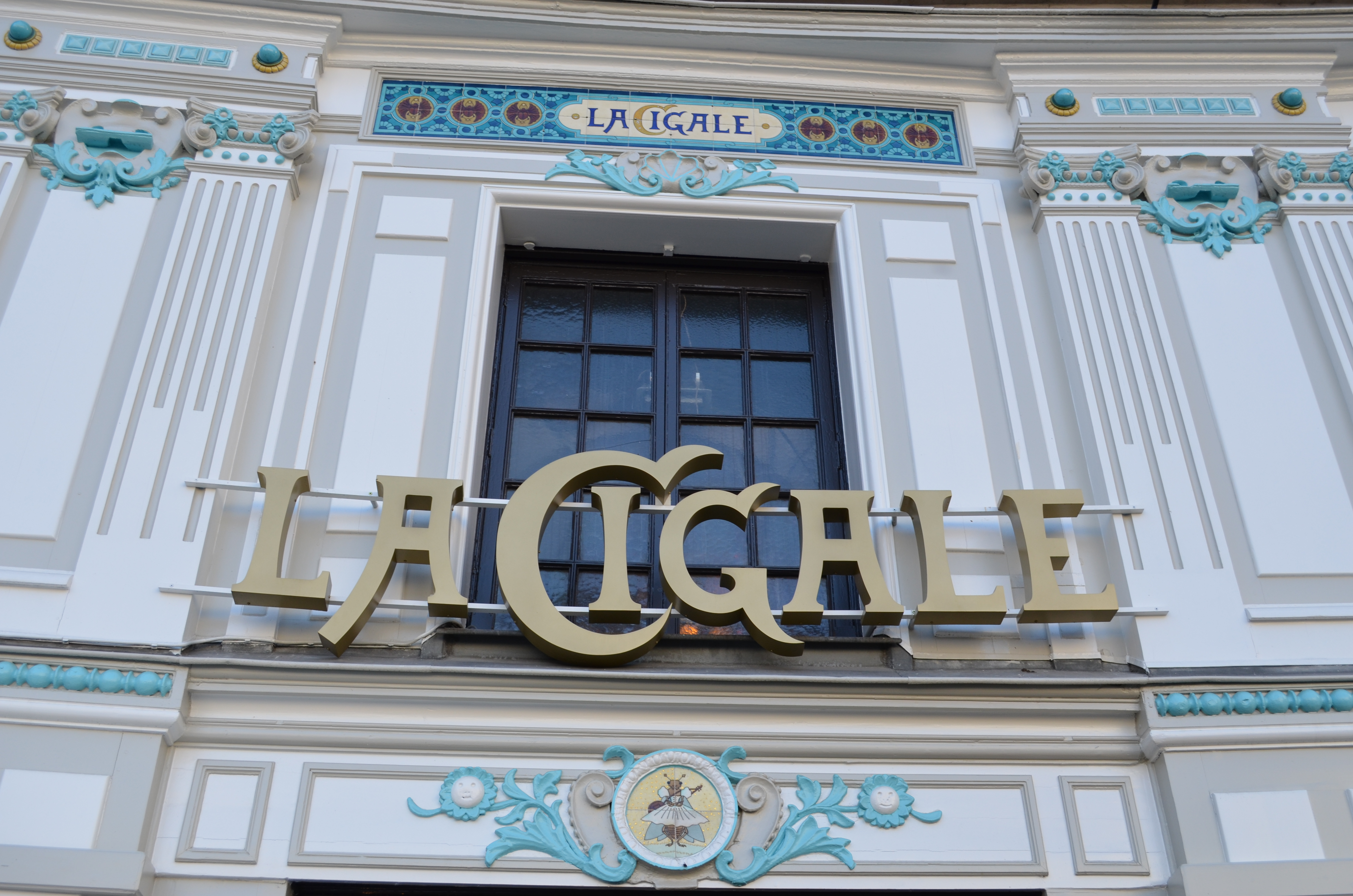
- La Cigale sign above the door of the brasserie in Nantes
- Interactive map of La Cigale

Restaurant information
- Established: 1895
- Owner: Private party
- Food type: Brasserie
- Dress code: Casual
- Location: 4 Place Graslin, Nantes, 44000, France
- Reservations: No
- Website: lacigale.com

La Cigale is a brasserie located in Nantes, France, on the same city square as the Théâtre Graslin. The locale has been classified as a historic monument since 1964.

== History ==
The restaurant was designed by the architect and ceramicist Émile Libaudière in the exaggerated Art nouveau style of the era. On 1 April 1895, the brasserie was opened for business by its first owner, Mrs. Calado.

From the beginning the restaurant attracted a bourgeois clientele that mixed with artists from the nearby theater. The surrealists Jacques Prévert and André Breton were regular patrons. Scenes from several films have been shot there, including Jacques Demy's 1961 film Lola, Debout les crabes, la mer monte ! by Jean-Jacques Grand-Jouan (1983), and Jacquot de Nantes by Agnès Varda (1991).

In 1964, the brasserie was turned into a fast-food restaurant, but the decor remained unchanged due to the protections afforded by its status as a historical monument. During the 1970s, the restaurant was neglected and eventually abandoned. However, a new owner restored it back to its original brasserie form in 1982.

== Gallery ==
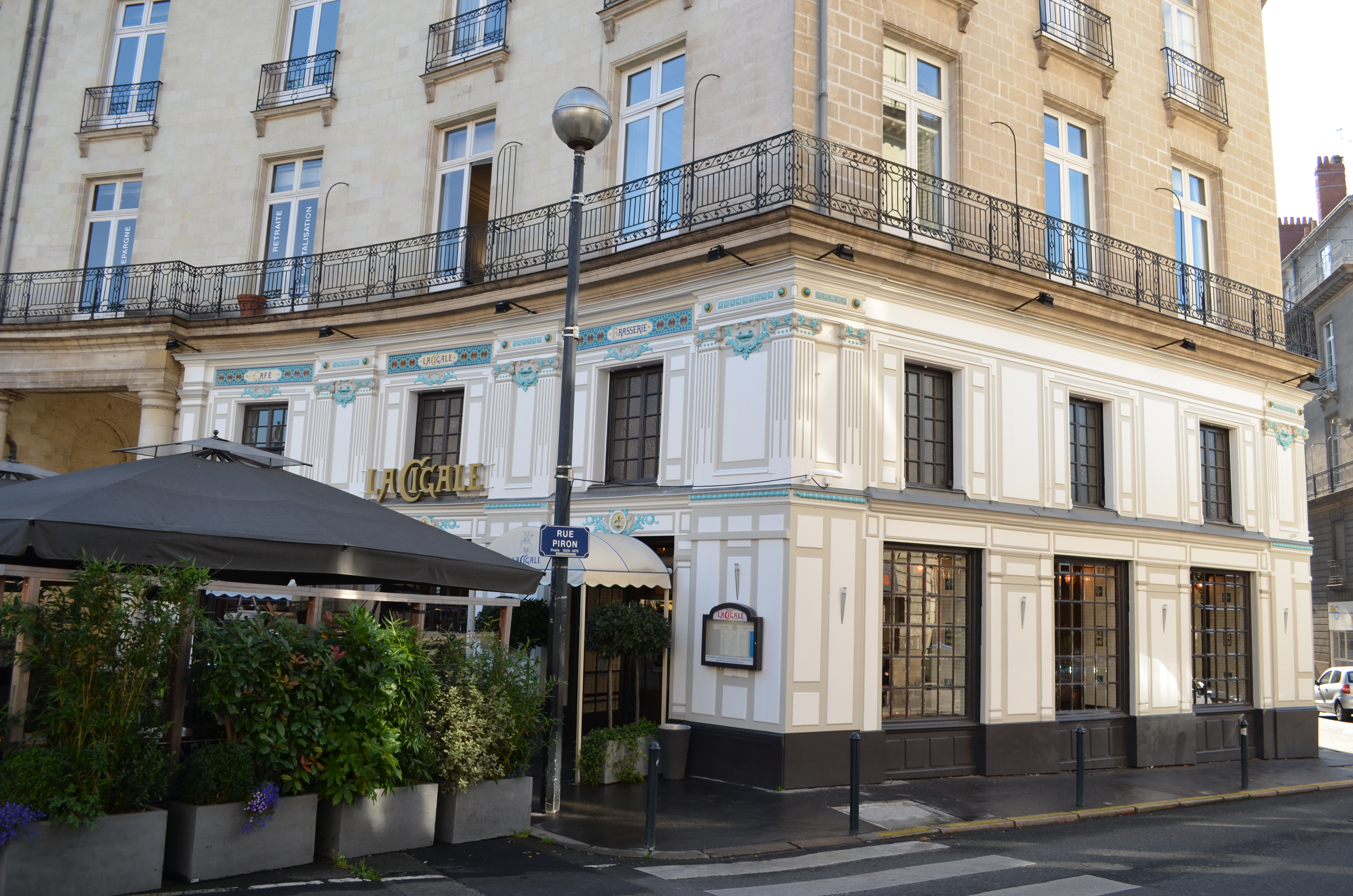

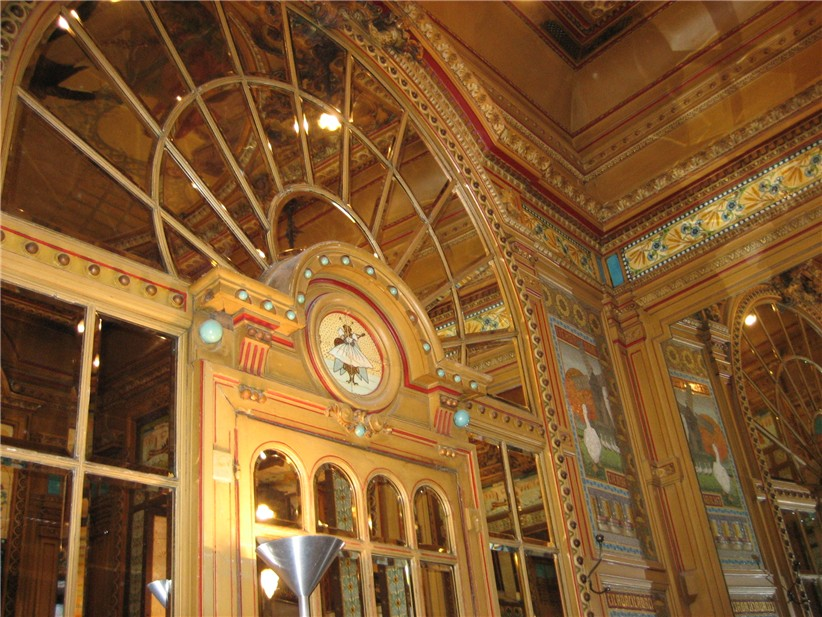

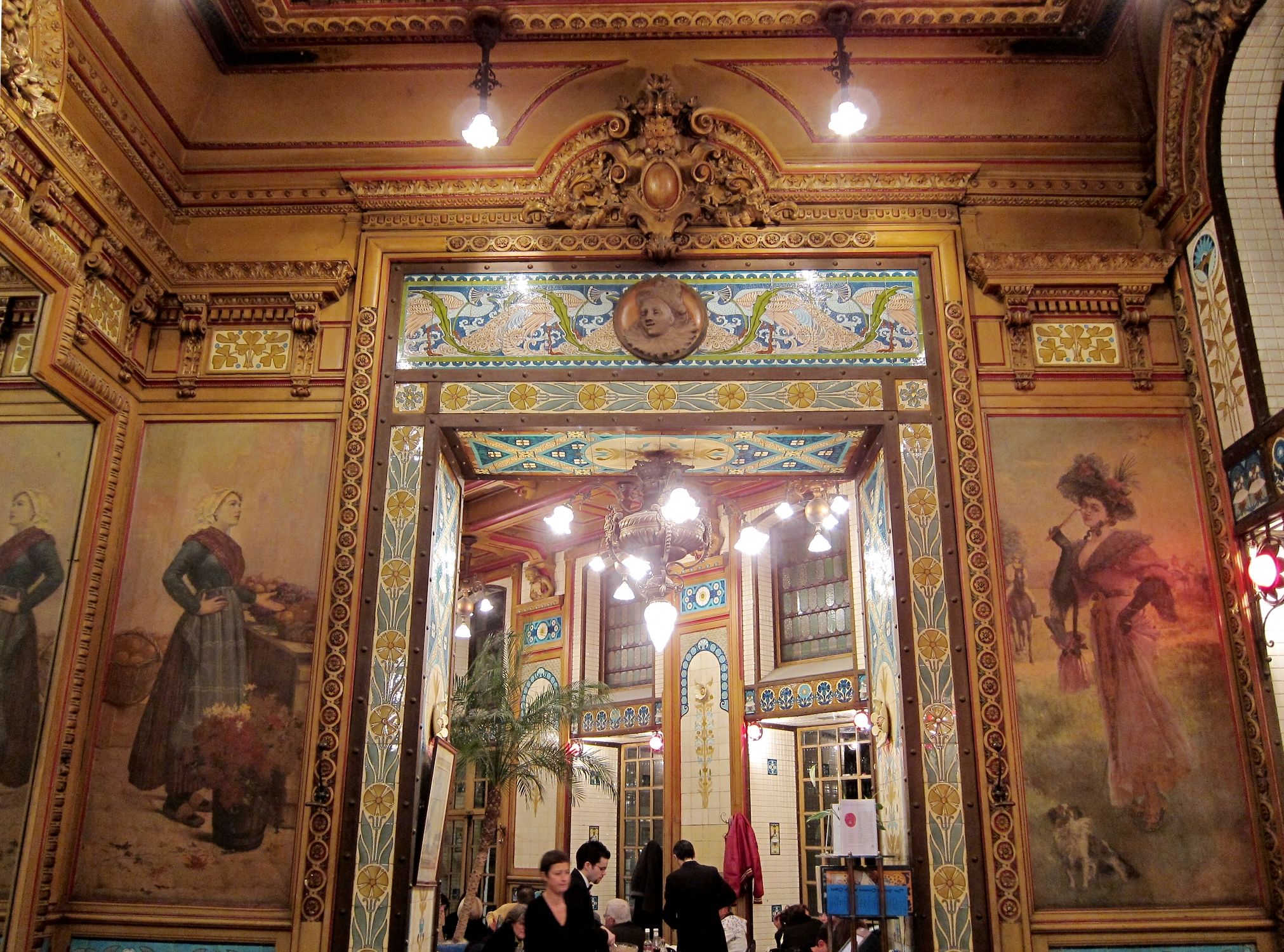

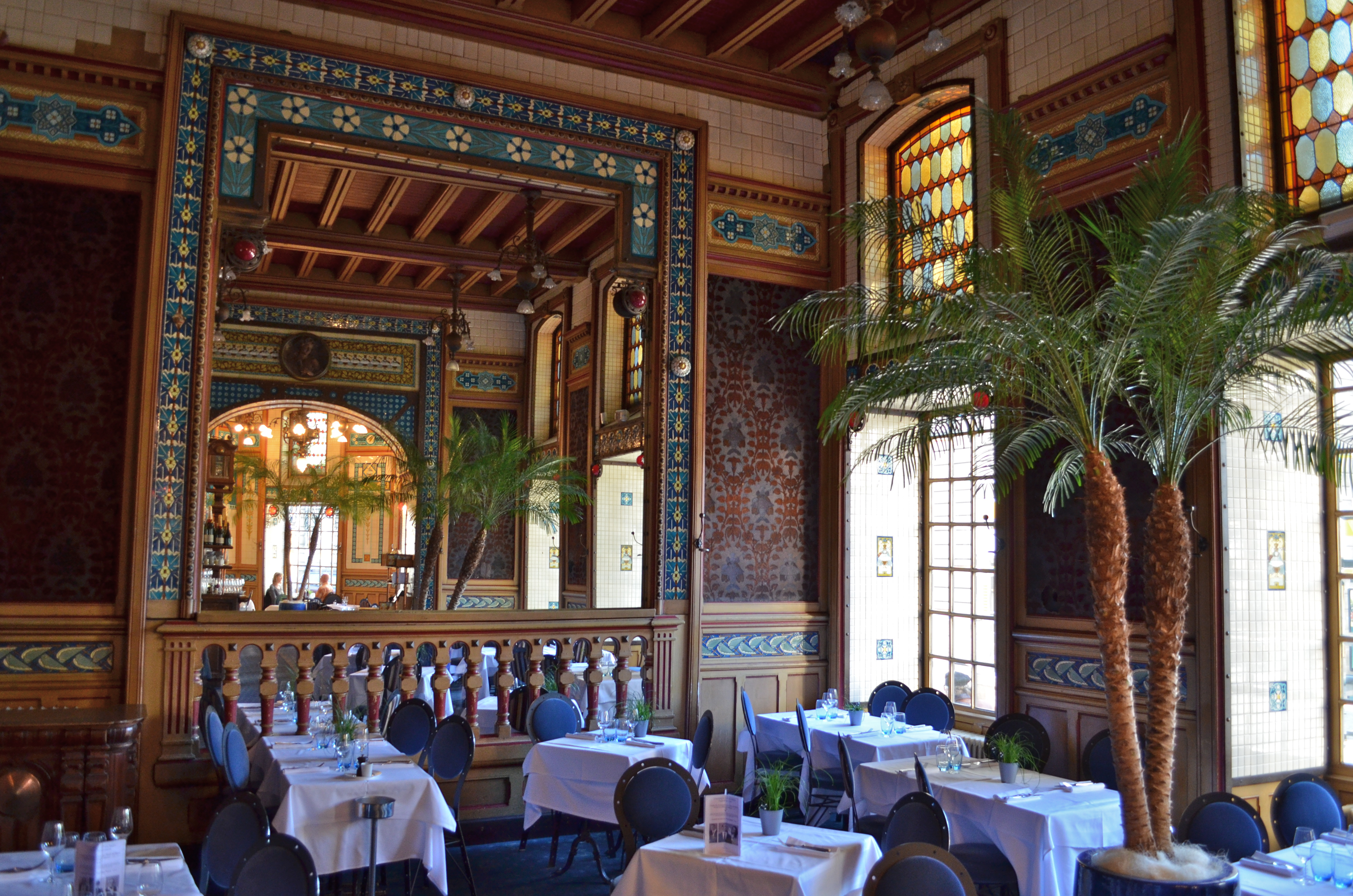

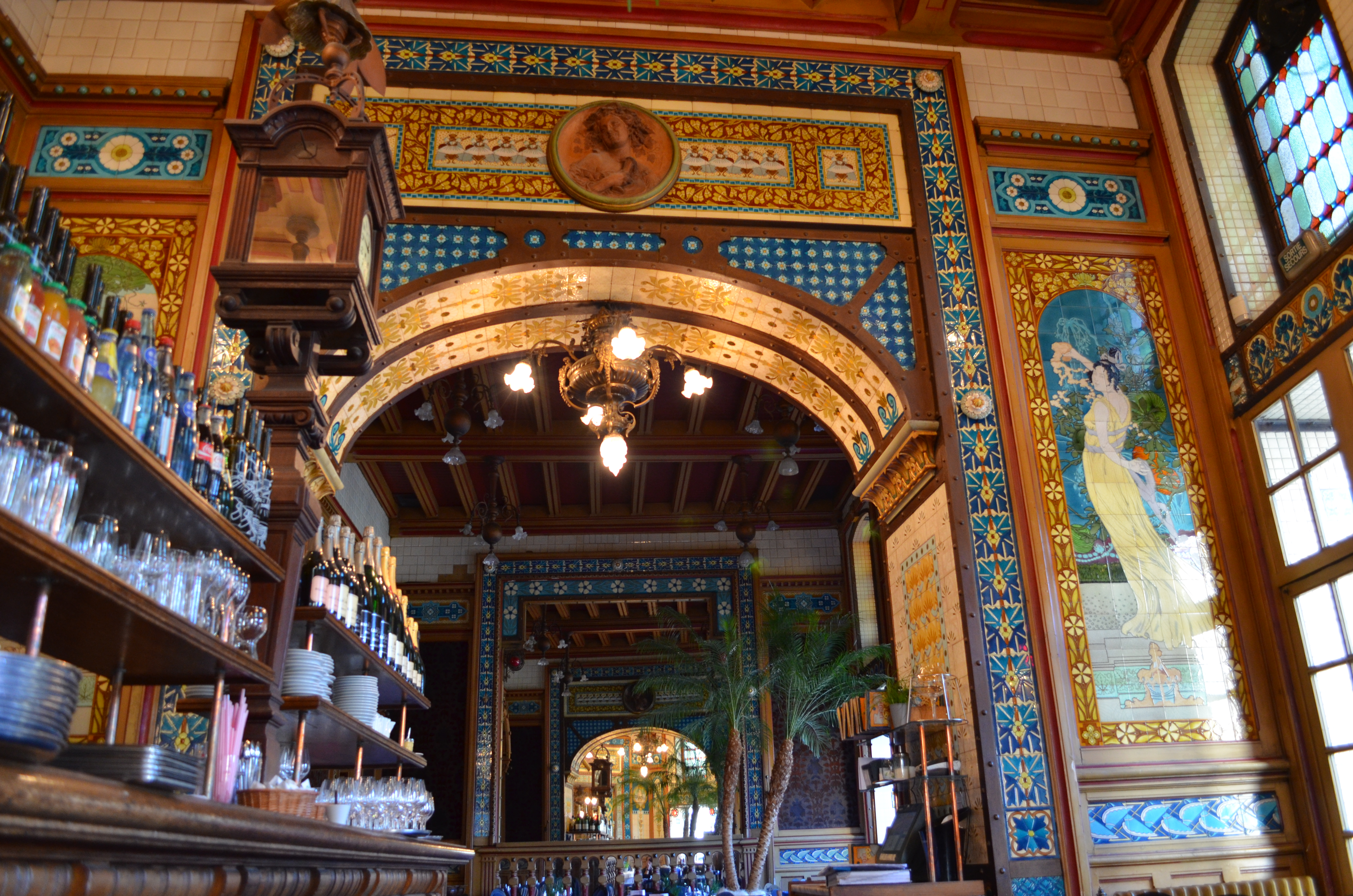

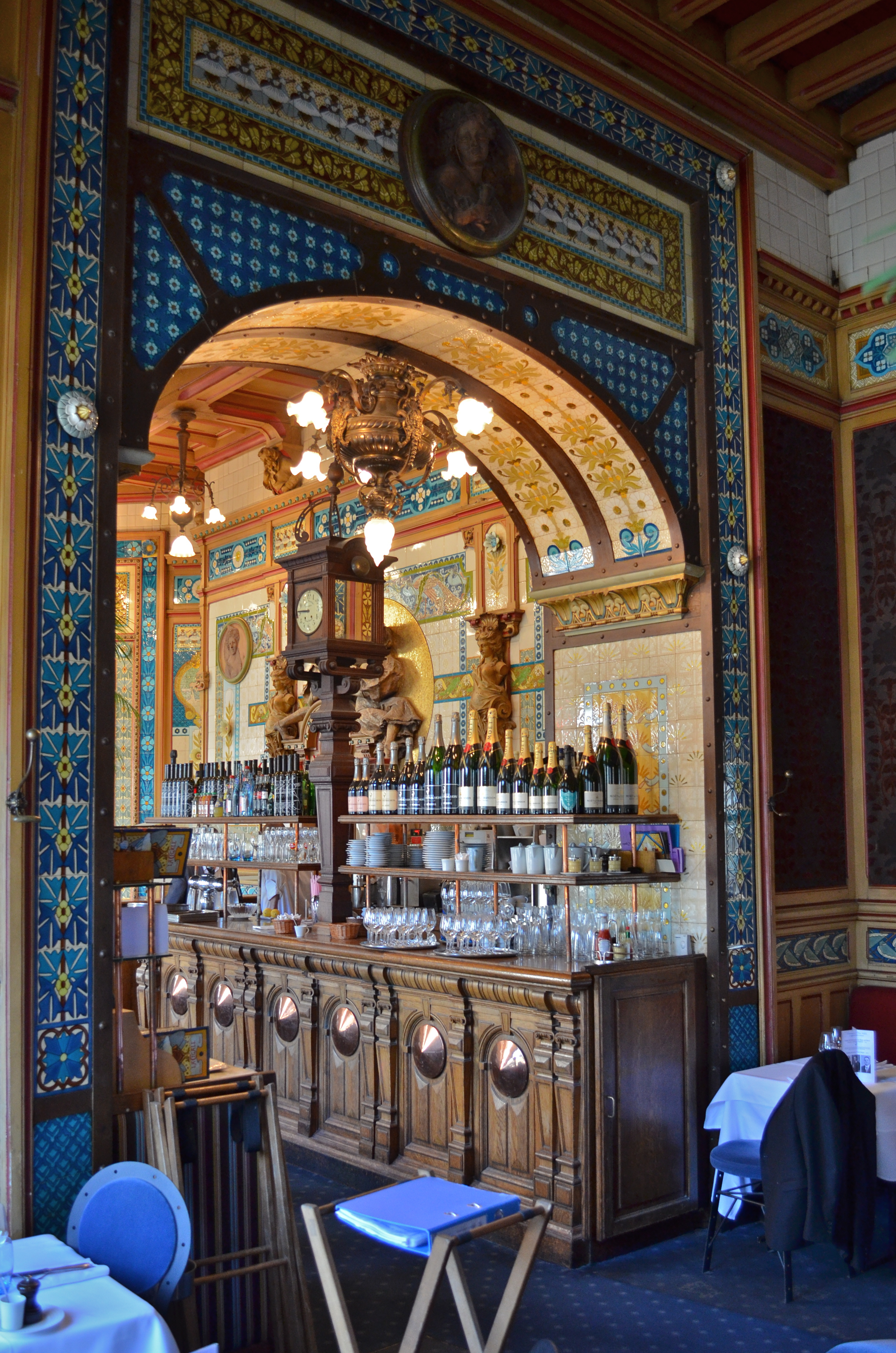
