= Stampe =

Stampe is a surname of German origin. Notable people with the surname include:

- John Stampe (1957–2012), Danish football player and coach
- Rigmor Stampe (1850–1923), Danish baroness, writer and philanthropist
- Veronika Stampe East German retired slalom canoeist

== See also ==
- Stampe et Vertongen, a Belgian aircraft manufacturer
- Stampee also called "stampe", a coin made by overstamping another foreign coin
