= SNCAC Martinet =

Martinet
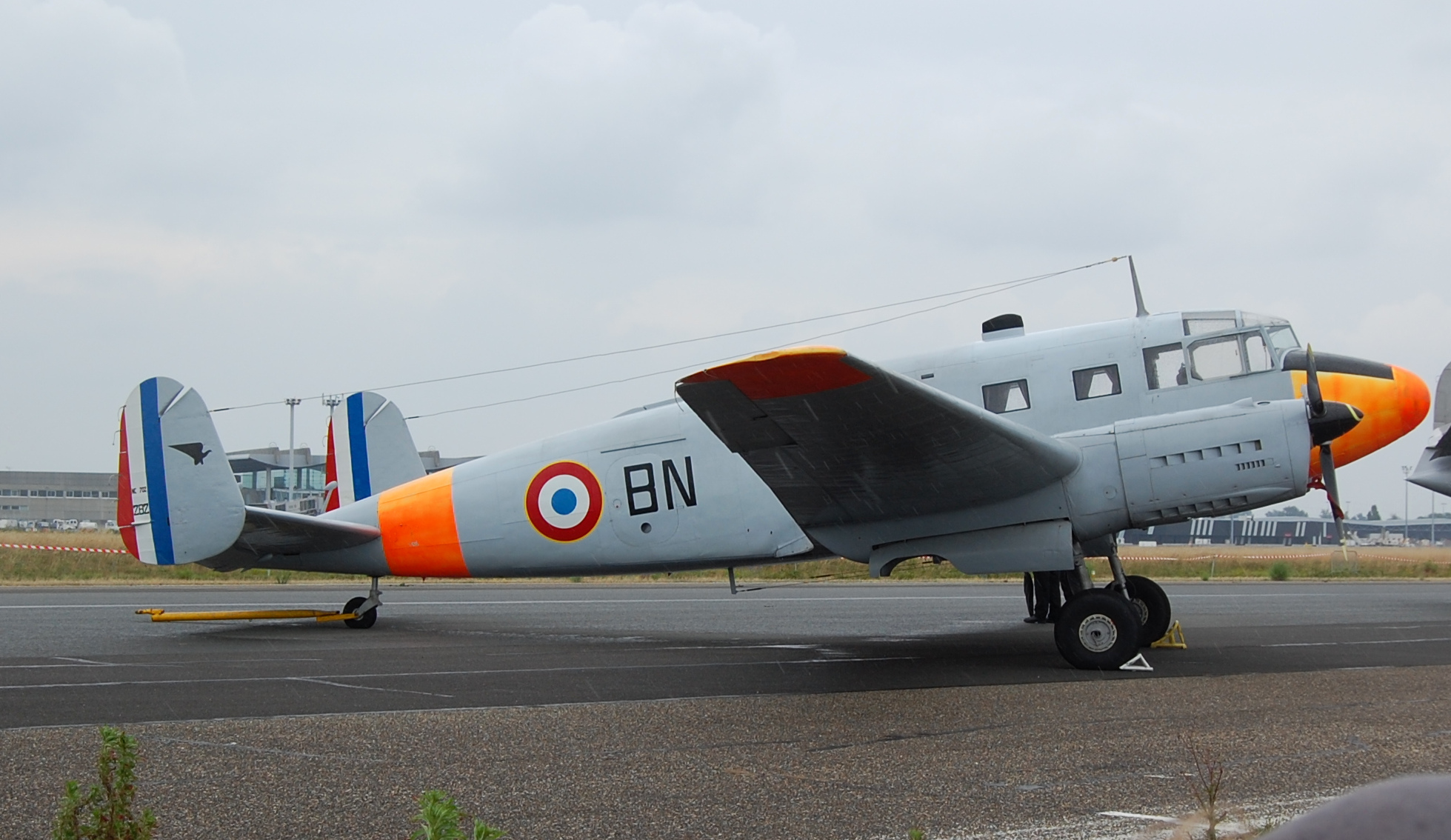
- A CAEA NC.702 Martinet

General information
- Type: Military trainer and light transport monoplane
- National origin: France
- Manufacturer: SNCAC
- Primary users: French Air Force French Navy; Air France
- Number built: 350

History
- Introduction date: 1945
- First flight: 1944
- Retired: 1963
- Developed from: Siebel Si 204

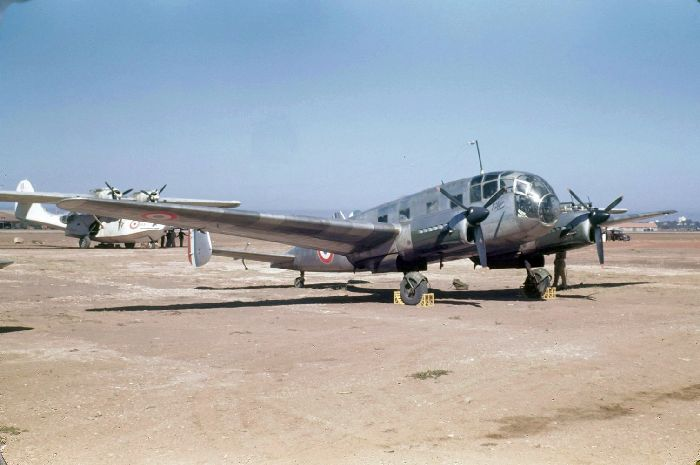
SNCAC NC.701 French Air Force North Africa. Compare the glazed nose to the NC.702 picture above

The SNCAC Martinet was a German-designed but French-built twin-engined military trainer and light transport monoplane. It was operated by the French military and in small numbers by French airlines from the late 1940s.

== Development ==
To aid the German war effort, the SNCAC factory at Bourges was ordered to produce 455 Siebel Si 204s light transports for the Luftwaffe. Production started in 1942 and 168 had been delivered before the Liberation stopped production. The French decided to continue producing the aircraft and designated the aircraft NC.700. Only a prototype NC.700 was built powered by Renault 12S-00 engines (derived from the German AS-411) although the designation was also used for a small number of aircraft originally intended for the Luftwaffe and diverted to the French Air Force.

The company then produced two variants; the NC.701 Martinet based on the Si 204D with a glazed unstepped nose and powered by two Renault 12S engines, and the NC.702 Martinet with a conventional stepped windscreen nose based on the Si 204A.

== Operational history ==
The Martinet was used by both the French Air Force and Navy and the final example did not retire until 1963. A small number were used by commercial operators including Air France but were soon replaced by larger aircraft like the Douglas DC-3. A number were used by the French Postal Service but they were grounded following an accident to F-BBFA is July 1946. The aircraft was used by the IGN for photo-survey work and a few aircraft were also exported to Poland and Sweden for use on photo-mapping duties.

== Variants ==
NC.700
A Renault 12S powered Si-204, one prototype.
NC.701
Trainer version with dual controls and transparent nose based on the Si-204D. Room for five students as a radio trainer.
NC.702
Eight-seat transport version based on the Si-204A.

== Operators ==
France

- Air France
- French Air Force
- French Navy

Morocco
Poland

- LOT Polish Airlines operated 6 NC.701 for aerial photography in 1947–1948.
- Polish Air Forces operated 6 aircraft taken from LOT airlines in 1948 for aerial photography until the 1950s.

Sweden

- Rikets Allmänna Kartverk operated five aircraft for aerial photography and survey.

== Survivors ==
- NC.702 282 with the Conservatoire de l'Air et de l'Espace d'Aquitaine, France
- NC.702 331 with the Deutsches Technikmuseum, Berlin, Germany
- NC.701 SE-KAL on display at the Air and Space Museum, Arlanda, Stockholm, Sweden.

== Specifications (NC.701) ==
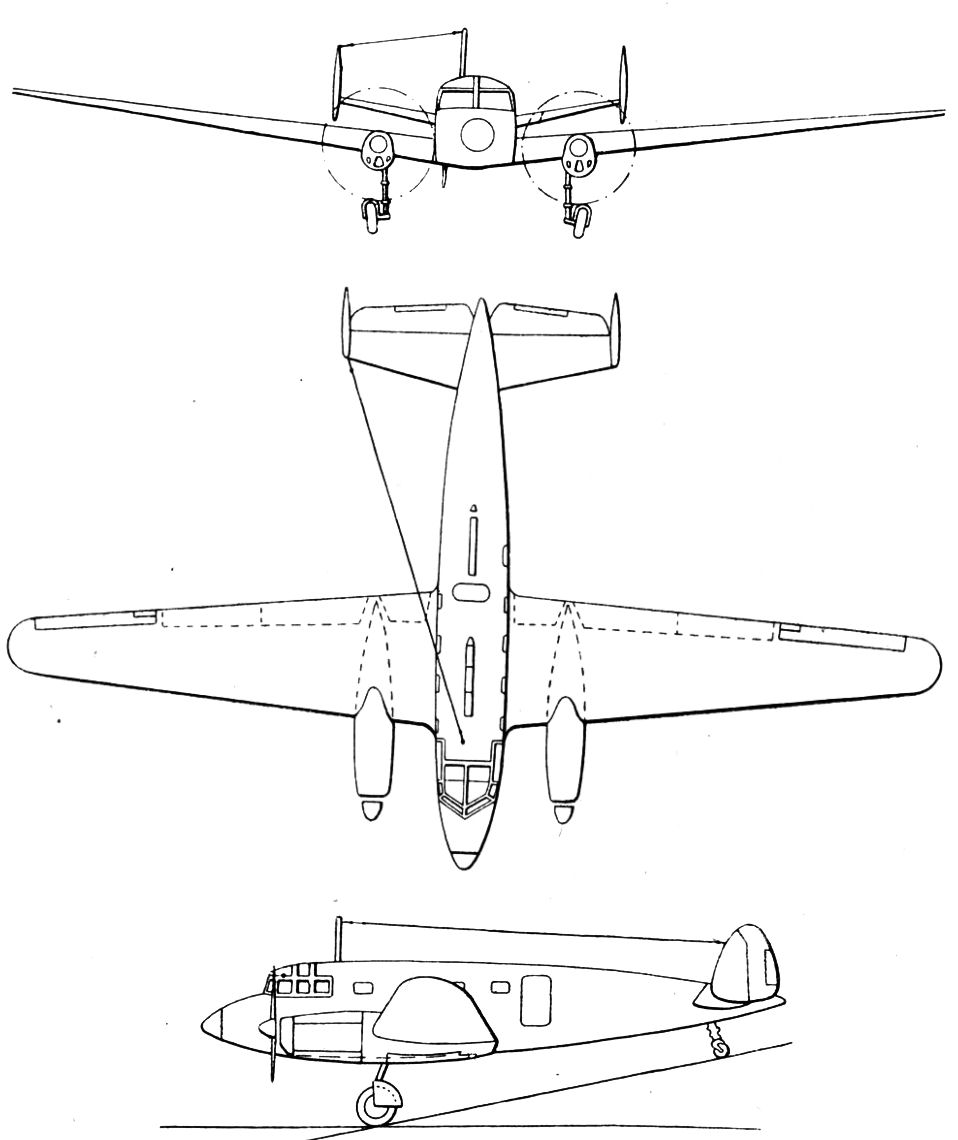
NC 702 3-view drawing from L'Aerophile magazine October 1946

Data from Jane's all the World's Aircraft 1947

General characteristics

- Crew: 2
- Capacity: 8 pax (NC.702: 5 student navigators)
- Length: 12.81 m (42 ft 0 in)
- Wingspan: 21.828 m (71 ft 7 in)
- Height: 4.4 m (14 ft 5 in)
- Wing area: 46 m^{2} (500 sq ft)
- Empty weight: 3,965 kg (8,741 lb)
- Gross weight: 5,600 kg (12,346 lb)
- Fuel capacity: :: Main tanks:800 L (210 US gal; 180 imp gal) fuel in four wing tanks

Long-range tanks: 480 L (130 US gal; 110 imp gal) in two optional long-range tanks
Oil: 120 L (32 US gal; 26 imp gal) oil in engine nacelle tanks

- Powerplant: 2 × Renault 12S-00 V-12 inverted air-cooled piston engines, 440 kW (590 hp) each
- Propellers: 3-bladed Ratier, 2.65 m (8 ft 8 in) diameter controllable-pitch airscrews

Performance

- Maximum speed: 350 km/h (220 mph, 190 kn) at 3,000 m (9,800 ft)
- Cruise speed: 325 km/h (202 mph, 175 kn) at 3,000 m (9,800 ft)
- Landing speed: 115 km/h (71 mph; 62 kn)
- Range: 810 km (500 mi, 440 nmi) with maximum fuel
- Ferry range: 2,000 km (1,200 mi, 1,100 nmi) with long-range tanks
- Service ceiling: 7,500 m (24,600 ft)
- Wing loading: 122 kg/m^{2} (25 lb/sq ft)
- Power/mass: 8.58 kg/kW (14.3 lb/hp)

== See also ==
Related development

- Siebel Si 204

== Bibliography ==
- Chillon, Jacques; Dubois, Jean-Pierre & Wegg, John (1980). French Post-War Transport Aircraft. Tonbridge, UK: Air-Britain. ISBN 0-85130-078-2.
- Forsgren, Jan (2017). "The Flying Darkroom: The Siebel Si 204 & Nord NC.701 in Sweden". The Aviation Historian (20): 100–117. ISSN 2051-1930.
- The Illustrated Encyclopedia of Aircraft (Part Work 1982-1985). Orbis Publishing.
- Taylor, Michael J. H. (1989). Jane's Encyclopedia of Aviation. London: Studio Editions.
