= Siebel =

German aircraft manufacturer

WMD-Siebelwerke ATG (WMD/SIAT)
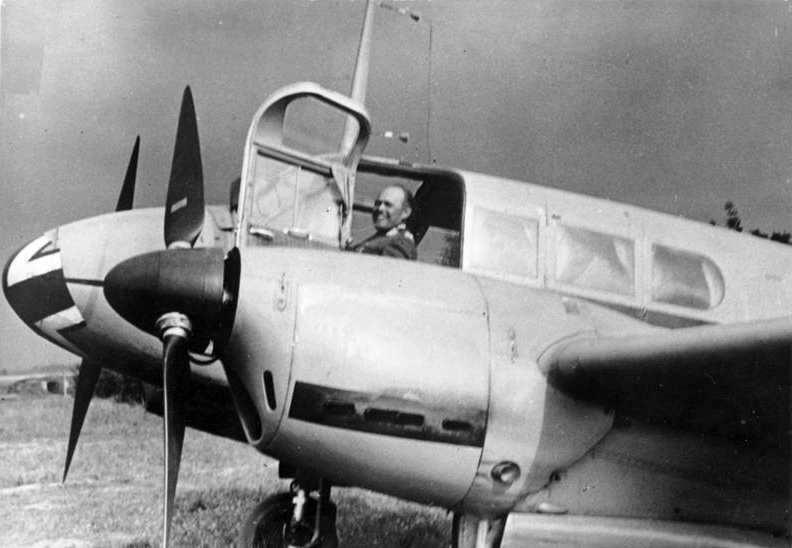
- Albert Kesselring in his Siebel Fh 104
- Formerly: Siebel Flugzeugwerke; Siebel Flugzeugwerke ATG (SIAT) (1948–1956)
- Industry: Aerospace
- Founded: 1937; 89 years ago
- Defunct: 1968
- Fate: Absorbed by Messerschmitt-Bölkow-Blohm
- Headquarters: Halle an der Saale, Germany

Siebel was a German aircraft manufacturer founded in 1937 in Halle an der Saale.

== History ==
It originated in the Klemm-Flugzeugwerke Halle that had been founded in 1934 as a branch of Leichtflugzeugbau Klemm in Böblingen. Its name changed to Siebel Flugzeugwerke when it was taken over by Friedrich Siebel in December 1937.

After World War II the company was revived as Siebel Flugzeugwerke ATG (SIAT) in West Germany in 1948, with its headquarters in Munich. In 1956, its headquarters were moved to Donauwörth and the company became WMD-Siebelwerke ATG (WMD/SIAT) in 1958 in cooperation with Waggon- und Maschinenbau GmbH Donauwörth (WMD). In 1968 the company was absorbed by Messerschmitt-Bölkow-Blohm after MBB became the major shareholder.

== Products ==
Siebel

- Siebel Fh 104 Hallore, medium transport
- Siebel Si 201, STOL reconnaissance aircraft (prototype)
- Siebel Si 202 "Hummel" sportplane + trainer, 1938
- Siebel Si 204, transport + aircrew trainer
- DFS 346, research aircraft
- Siebel ferry, landing craft

SIAT

- SIAT 222
- SIAT 223 Flamingo

== See also ==
- List of RLM aircraft designations
