= SNCAC NC.2001 Abeille =

NC.2001 Abeille
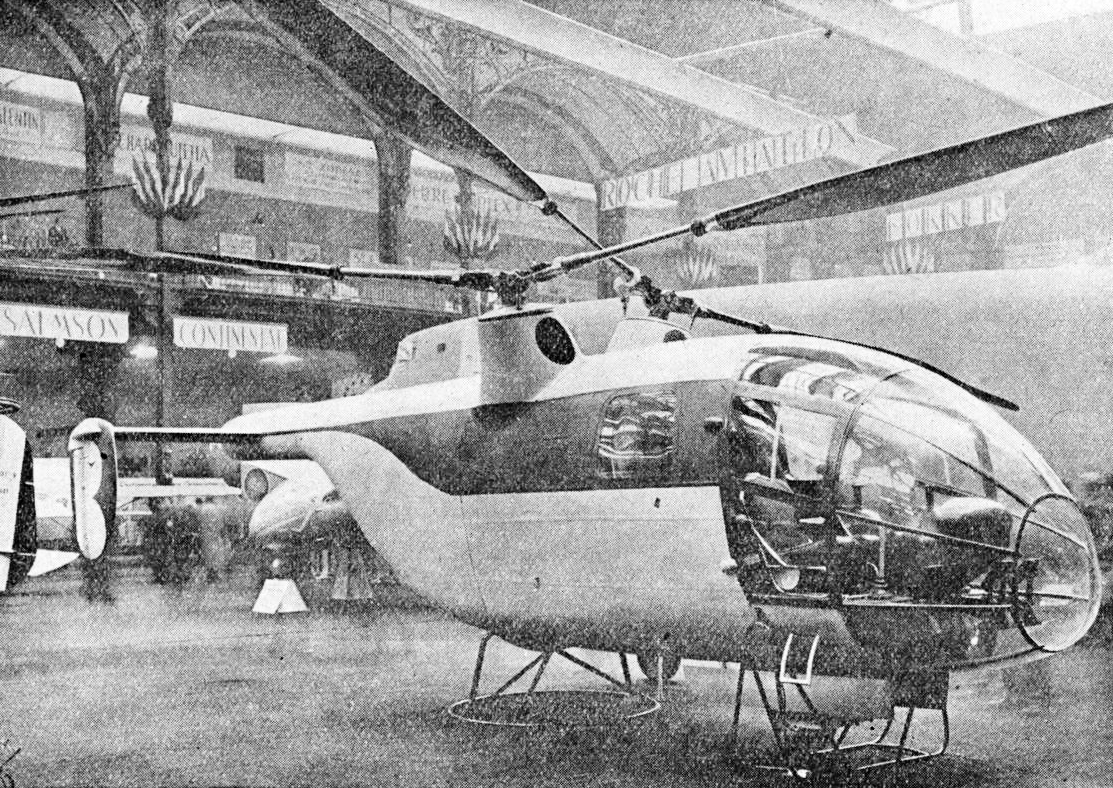

General information
- Type: Five seat, twin rotor helicopter
- National origin: France
- Manufacturer: SNCAC
- Designer: René Dorand
- Number built: 3

History
- First flight: 28 June 1949

The SNCAC NC.2001 Abeille (English: Bee) was a single engine, twin intermeshing rotor helicopter designed and built in France in the late 1940s. Three were completed but only one flew, development ending when SNCAC was closed.

== Design and development ==
The design of the Abeille was directed by René Dorand at the helicopter division of SNCAC. An intermeshing rotor layout was chosen instead of a tail rotor design, following the examples of the 1939 Flettner Fl 265 and the Kellet XR-8 of 1944. Its twin, two blade rotors were driven by shafts which leaned out of the fuselage side-by-side. The rotor blades, which began some way from the hub, tapered strongly. Pitch and roll were adjusted from the control column by altering cyclic pitch via a pair of swashplates and yaw by changing the relative collective pitch of the two rotors with the pedals. Forward tilt of the rotor shafts was automatically linked to forward speed. A single lever controlled both the collective pitch and the throttle through an electrical link. The Abeille was powered by a 429 kW (575 hp) Renault 12S, an inverted, air-cooled V-12 engine.

The Abeille had a pod and boom, all-metal fuselage. The nose was fully glazed with two side by side crew seats ahead of a cabin with a bench seat for three passengers. The engine and gearboxes were behind them. Aft, a high mounted boom carried the empennage, which on the first prototype consisted of a tall T-tail with a narrow fin. On the second machine the tailplane was lowered to the top of the fuselage and had a pair of fins at its extremities, each roughly elliptical and mounted from its top. The tails was wooden, with fabric covered. The Abeille's fixed main landing gear had two wheels on a single axle positioned a little behind the rotor shafts and mounted on broad, single struts to the mid-upper fuselage, together with a smaller nose wheel.

Three examples of the Abeille were built. The first was destroyed by fire before it had flown. The second made its first flight on 28 June 1949, piloted by Claude Dellys. SNCAC was closed in that month, its assets distributed between three remaining state owned firms and as a result the Abeille programme was abandoned; the second machine did not fly again and the third never flew.

== Specifications ==
Data from Gaillard (1990), p.98. All performance figures are estimated.

General characteristics

- Crew: 2
- Capacity: 3 passengers
- Length: 9.70 m (31 ft 10 in)
- Empty weight: 2,064 kg (4,550 lb)
- Gross weight: 2,694 kg (5,940 lb)
- Powerplant: 1 × Renault 12S inverted V-12, liquid-cooled, 429 kW (575 hp) take-off power
- Main rotor diameter: 2 × 13.70 m (44 ft 11 in)

Performance

- Maximum speed: 250 km/h (160 mph, 130 kn)
- Cruise speed: 180 km/h (110 mph, 97 kn)
- Service ceiling: 2,500 m (8,200 ft) hovering out of ground effect

== See also ==
- List of rotorcraft
