= MBB 223 Flamingo =

Light single engine aircraft developed in West Germany in the 1960s

223 Flamingo
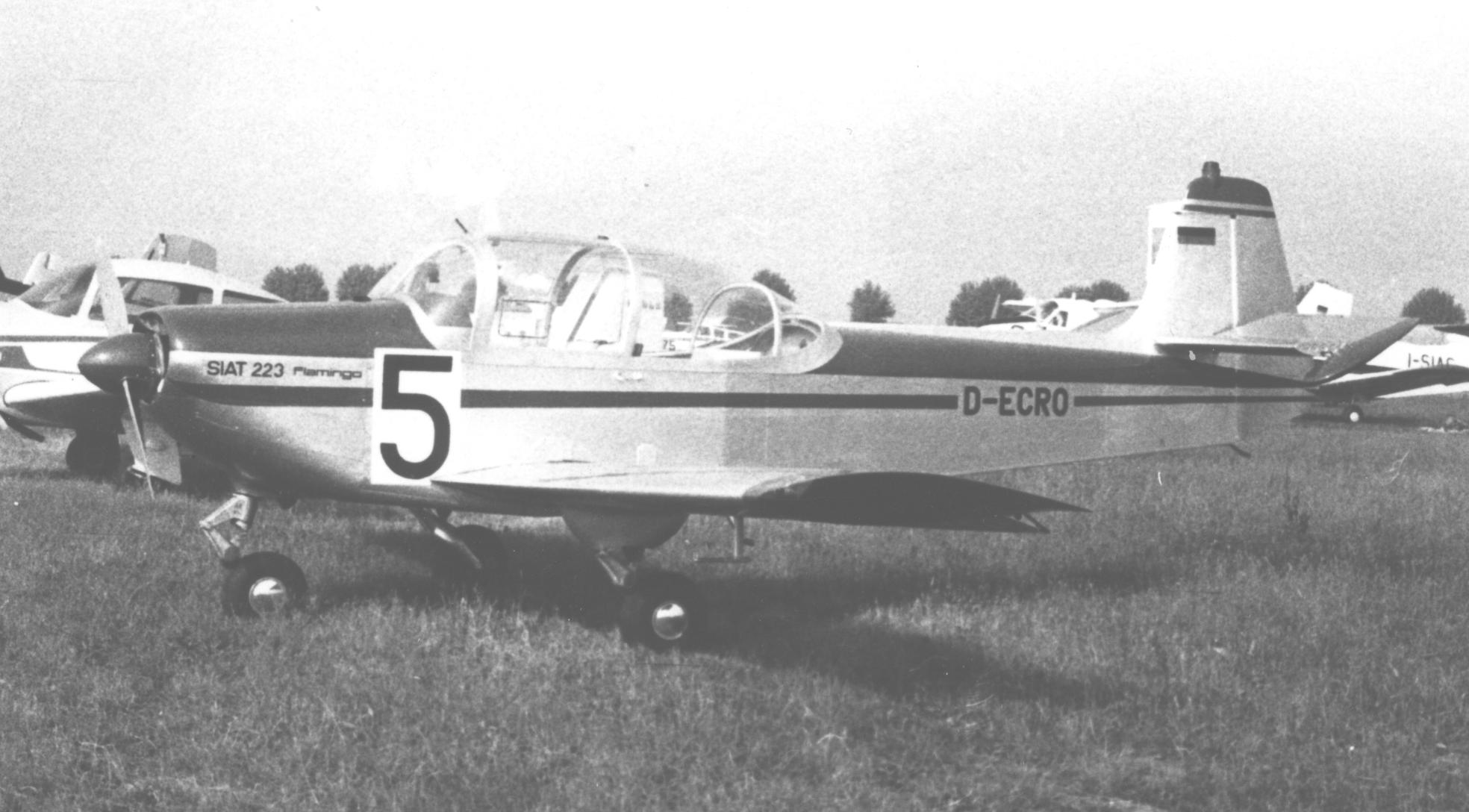
- SIAT-built Flamingo at the Paris Air Show at Le Bourget Airport in June 1967

General information
- Type: Civil trainer aircraft
- Manufacturer: SIAT/MBB; CASA; Farner Werke

History
- First flight: 1 March 1967

The MBB 223 Flamingo was a light aircraft developed in West Germany in the 1960s in response to a competition for a standard trainer for the country's aeroclubs. Designed by SIAT, it was a conventional low-wing monoplane with fixed tricycle undercarriage. The cockpit was enclosed by a large bubble canopy. SIAT had not undertaken much production of the type before the firm was acquired by MBB in 1970. Eventually, the new owners transferred production to CASA in Spain.

A fully acrobatic, single-seat version, and a four-seat utility version were also developed.

== Operational history ==
During the 2020 Turkish intervention in Idlib, Turkish airstrikes on Kweres Airfield destroyed at least 3 stored Syrian Air Force MBB 223 Flamingos.

== Variants ==
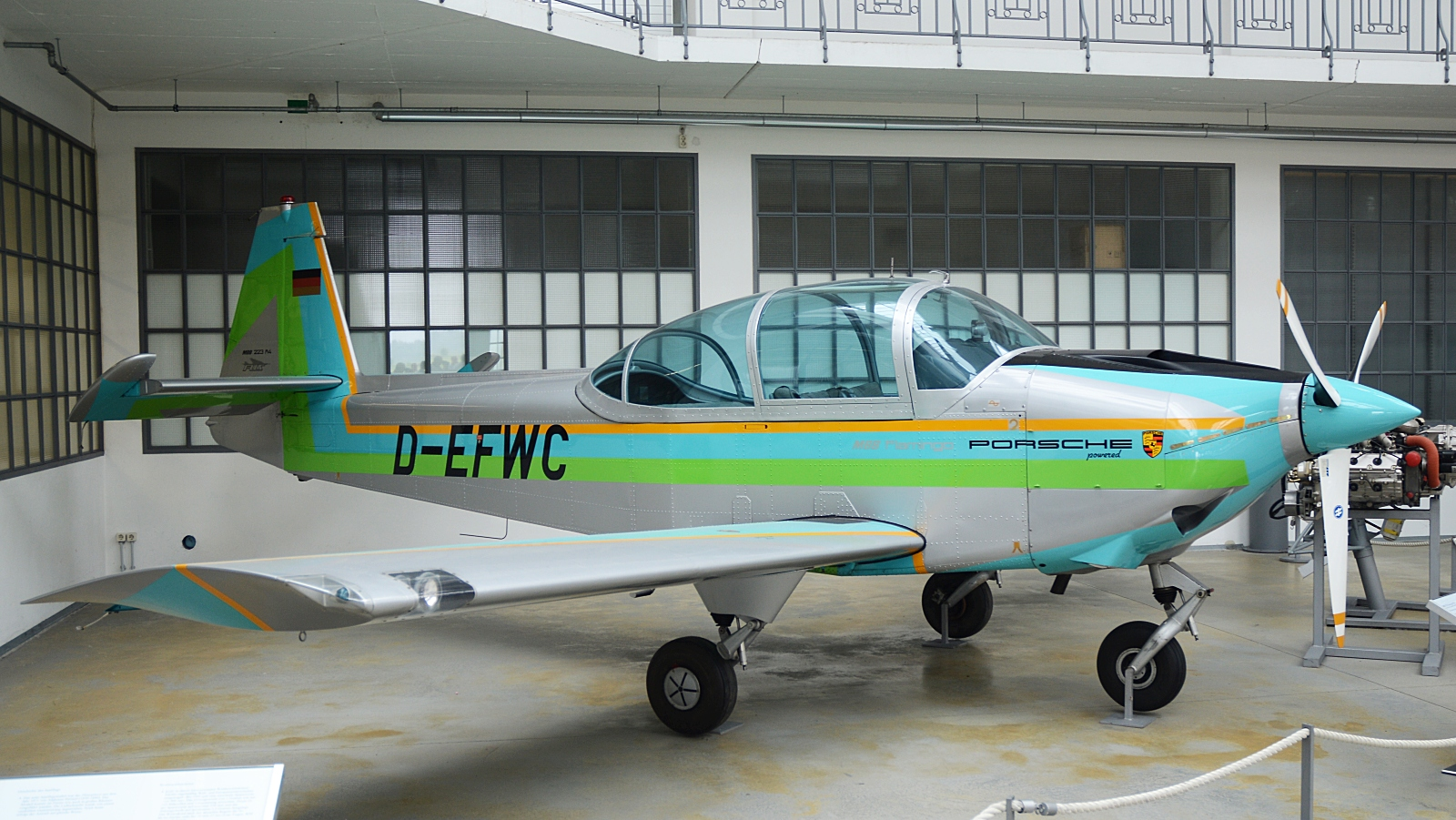
Porsche-powered version at the Deutsches Museum Flugwerft Schleissheim, Munich, Germany

Model 223A-1 Flamingo Trainer A1
Two or four-seat trainer aircraft, powered by a 149-kW (200-hp) Avco Lycoming IO-360 piston engine.
Model 223K-1 Flamingo Trainer K1
Single-seat aerobatic aircraft, powered by a 149-kW (200-hp) Avco Lycoming AIO-360 piston engine.
Model 223T-1 Flamingo Trainer T1
One aircraft fitted with a turbocharged 157-kW (210-hp) Avco Lycoming TO-360-C1A6D piston engine.
Model 223-M4
The Model 223T-1 Flamingo Trainer T1 was later fitted with a Porsche PFM 3200 engine. One aircraft only.

== Operators ==
=== Military operators ===
Syria

- Syrian Air Force

=== Former operators ===
Switzerland

- Swissair

Turkey

== Specifications ==
Data from Jane's All the World's Aircraft 1971–72

General characteristics

- Crew: 2 (pilot and instructor)
- Capacity: provision for additional folding seat for two children or one adult
- Length: 7.43 m (24 ft 5 in)
- Wingspan: 8.28 m (27 ft 2 in)
- Height: 2.70 m (8 ft 10 in)
- Wing area: 11.50 m^{2} (123.8 sq ft)
- Airfoil: NACA 64_{2}A215
- Empty weight: 685 kg (1,510 lb)
- Max takeoff weight: 1,050 kg (2,315 lb)
- Fuel capacity: 220 L (58 US gal; 48 imp gal)
- Powerplant: 1 × Avco Lycoming IO-360-C1B air-cooled flat-four engine, 150 kW (200 hp)
- Propellers: 2-bladed Hartzell constant-speed, 1.80 m (5 ft 11 in) diameter

Performance

- Maximum speed: 243 km/h (151 mph, 131 kn)
- Cruise speed: 216 km/h (134 mph, 117 kn) (75% power)
- Never exceed speed: 380 km/h (240 mph, 210 kn)
- Range: 1,150 km (710 mi, 620 nmi)
- Service ceiling: 3,750 m (12,300 ft)
- Rate of climb: 4.30 m/s (846 ft/min)
