= Siebel Si 204 =

Utility transport aircraft by Siebel

Si 204
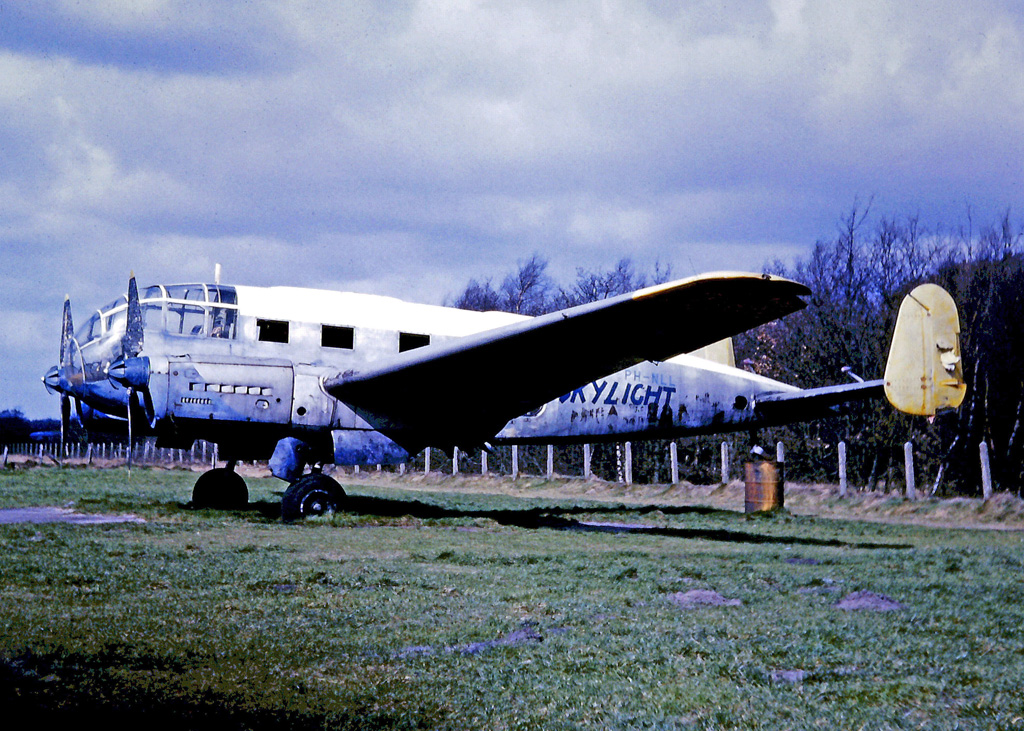
- Siebel Si 204D PH-NLL displayed at Hilversum Airport in 1967

General information
- Type: Light transport/trainer
- National origin: Germany
- Manufacturer: Siebel
- Primary users: Luftwaffe Czechoslovakia; France
- Number built: 1,216 (to January 1945)

History
- Developed from: Siebel Fh 104 Hallore

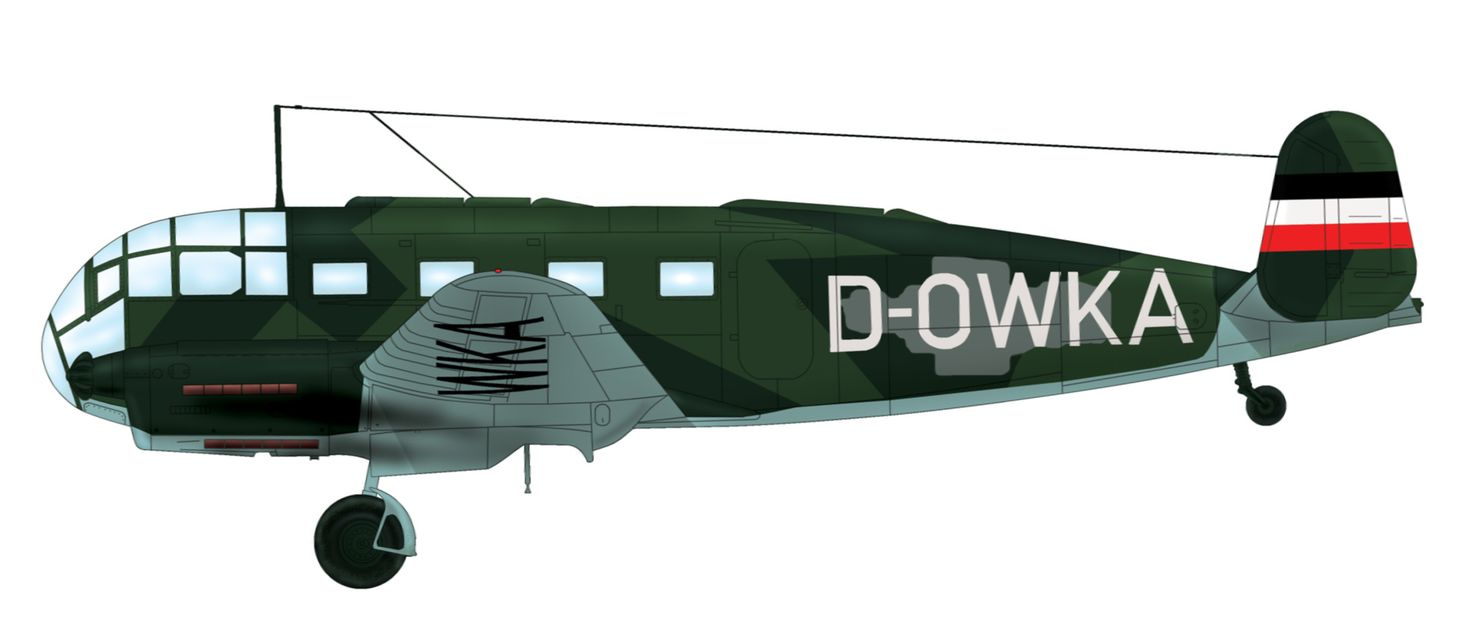
Siebel Si 204D-1, D-OWKA, used by 2./KG 200 in support of Albert Speer's peace negotiations in April 1945. The aircraft flew between Prague and Zurich. And in support of Karl Hermann Frank's negotiations with Karl Dönitz government, he flew it between Prague and Flensburg-Mürwick and Hradec Králové in May 1945. Apparently changed its markings daily

The Siebel Si 204 is a small twin-engined transport and trainer aircraft developed in World War II. It was based on the Siebel Fh 104 Hallore. Originally designed in response to a German Ministry of Aviation development order for a small civil transport aircraft in 1938, it was eventually produced for the Luftwaffe.

== Development and production ==
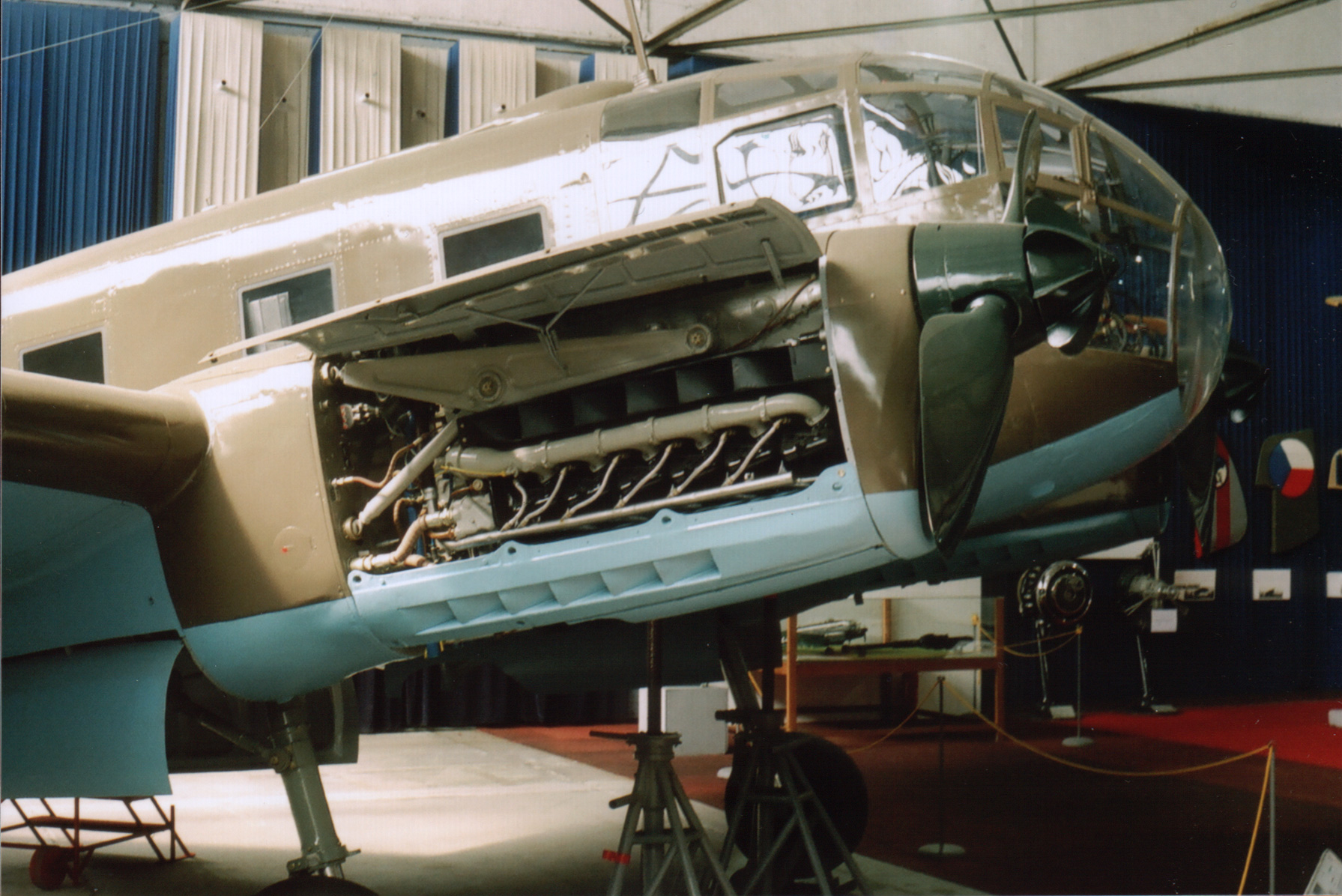
Siebel 204 at the Kbely museum near Prague

The Si 204 was planned as a small all-metal passenger aircraft with two crew and eight passengers for German airline Deutsche Luft Hansa (DLH). Development was initiated in 1938. The contractor was, as usual, the RLM, but the development was conducted in close collaboration between DLH and Siebel in Halle.

After the beginning of the war, the aircraft was redesigned as a trainer aircraft with a full "stepless" glass cockpit, as had been initiated with the He 111P in early 1938, with no separate flat windscreen for the pilot (much as almost all German bomber aircraft of the time were being designed), which seemed to be better for instrument flying in the Si 204's case.

The first two prototypes only were delivered as passenger aircraft with the old cockpit. The maiden flight of the first prototype was before September 1940, possibly on 25 May 1940, that of the second prototype before February 1941. The third prototype was redesigned as a trainer aircraft for instrument flying. As a result of this, the maiden flight was not earlier than the end of 1941 or the beginning of 1942.

At that time, Siebel produced the Junkers Ju 88 under licence, so only 15 prototypes were able to be built in Halle. As a result, Société Nationale de Constructions Aéronautiques du Nord (SNCAN) in France produced the A-0 preseries and A-1 production passenger aircraft between April 1942 and November 1943.

Českomoravská Kolben-Daněk (ČKD, called Böhmisch-Mährische Maschinenfabrik AG [BMM] in German) in the Protectorate of Bohemia and Moravia delivered the first instrument flight trainer D-0 in January 1943 followed by production of a further 44 D-0 preseries aircraft. The D-1 series was begun in March 1943 by Aero, also in the Protectorate, and by BMM in June or July 1943. In August 1943, SNCAN also delivered their first D-1.

Production of the D-3 was started in October 1944 by Aero Vodochody. The D-3 had wooden wings and a tail-plane made of wood and metal. French production of the D-1 was ended in August 1944 after the Liberation. SNCAN produced a total of 168 units of the Si 204. BMM produced the aircraft until October 1944 and then changed to producing spare parts for the Si 204. The Aero company was scheduled to cease production of the D-1 in March 1945 after building 486 aircraft and then switch to D-3 only. The aircraft, however, was only built until January 1945 with 541 completed.

Therefore, total production was 1,216 (until January 1945) including the prototypes; some production in other countries continued after the war ended.

== Operational history ==
Scrapped Siebel Si 204 at Wunstorf, Germany, 1945

The Si 204D was used mainly in B- and C-Schools (advanced schools) and in FÜG 1 (delivery wing of the Luftwaffe), probably as a taxi aircraft for crews who had delivered other aircraft to fighting units. Its use in instrument flight schools was sporadic; for radio schools, no evidence of use has been found. The Si 204A flew mainly with communications squadrons and flying services for senior officers, but also with schools.

In July 1944, five Si 204 were destined to be converted to night-combat aircraft, but no further aircraft were allotted. They were probably intended for the pre-series Si 204 E-0. However, no evidence shows that these aircraft were ever used in combat situations.

Luft Hansa received at least four Si 204s: The first prototype, D-AEFR, was evaluated from March to May 1941 by Luft Hansa Prague. From spring 1942 to spring 1943, the second prototype, D-ASGU, was used on regular routes as a freight carrier.

An Si 204 was likely the last German aircraft shot down on the Western Front. At 8 p.m. on May 8, 1945, 2nd Lt. K. L. Smith of the 9th Air Force's 474th Fighter Group, flying a P-38 Lightning, downed a Siebel 3 miles southeast of Rodach, Bavaria.

At the end of the war, one Si 204D remained in Berlin-Tempelhof (named "Rhein"). One flew to Enns in Austria, where it was captured by the Allies.

Captured Si 204s flew in a variety of civil roles in the post-war USSR, serving with Aeroflot until 1949, being particularly successful in Tajikistan regional services. Soviet Polar Aviation flew seven Si 204s, equipped with skis, in Siberia. Major engine deficiencies in the extreme climate conditions, with four aircraft lost, caused local aircrew to nickname the Si 204 Giebel, Russian for disaster, before withdrawal from the region. The last Soviet Si 204, flying with the Agricultural Survey, was retired in 1951.

== Prototypes ==
Version	Engine	Usage	First Flight	Fate
V1	As 410	Prototype passenger plane, Reg. D-AEFR	25 May 1940?	Not mentioned in November 1942, scrapped?
V2	As 410	Prototype passenger aircraft, Reg. D-ASGU	Before February 1941	26.02.44 Crash Erprobungs-Stelle Rechlin
V3	As 410	Prototype instrument flight trainer aircraft	Before February 1942	01.06.42 Crash Erprobungs-Stelle Rechlin
V4	As 411	Prototype instrument flight trainer aircraft, Reg. KM+GB	Before November 1942	
V5		For stress testing		
V6	As 410	Evaluation As 410	December 1942	
V7	As 410	Weather reconnaissance		
V8	As 410	General flight evaluation		
V9	As 410	General flight evaluation		30.06.43 Crash School C-16 Burg
V10	As 410	General flight evaluation		
V11	As 410	General flight evaluation		
V12	As 410	General flight evaluation		13.03.44 Crash Erprobungs-Stelle Rechlin
V13	As 410	General flight evaluation		
V14	As 411	Prototype D-2		
V15	As 411	Evaluation As 411		

== Variants ==
Si 204
Prototypes each given a separate V number; fifteen built by Siebel at Halle.
Si 204A
Pre-production A-0 and initial production A-1 passenger transports built at SNCAN (Société Nationale de Constructions Aéronautiques du Nord) in France.
Si 204D
An instrument flight trainer developed by ČKD (BMM) in the Protectorate of Bohemia and Moravia; the first D-0 pre-series aircraft was delivered in January 1943 plus another 44. Production of the D-1 was carried out by Aero and BMM. D-3 aircraft were built with wooden wings and tailplanes in an effort to relieve pressure on the aluminium supply.
Aero C-3
Postwar production in Czechoslovakia for flying (C-3A) and crew training (C-3B).
Aero C-103
Civilian passenger transport variant.
Aero D-44
Military transport variant.
SNCAC NC.701 Martinet
Military transport powered by two SNECMA 12S-00 inverted air-cooled V-12 engines.
SNCAC NC.702 Martinet
Passenger transport version with stepped windscreen.

Production figures of the Si 204 until 31 January 1945:

Version	Siebel	SNCAC	BMM/ČKD	Aero	SUM
Prototypes	15				15
A-0		30			30
A-1		85			85
D-0			45		45
D-1		53	447	477	977
D-3				64	64
SUM	15	168	492	541	1.216

Sources: Files from Federal Archive/Military Archive Freiburg and from Lufthansa-Archive, Cologne

After the war, the production of Si 204 continued in Czechoslovakia and France. In Czechoslovakia Aero Vodochody produced 179 Si 204D, developed into military trainer variants Aero C-3A and C-3B (the latter for bombardier training), passenger variant C-103 and military transport variant Aero D-44 until 1949. In France SNCAC (Société Nationale de Constructions Aéronautiques du Centre), commonly known as Aérocentre, produced 240 transport NC.701 Martinets and a number (110?) of passenger NC.702 Martinets. The NC.701 was distinguished by three-blade propellers and was powered by 440 kW (590 hp) Renault 12S-00 engines. The NC.702 had a modified nose.

== Operators ==
=== Military operators ===
Czechoslovakia

- Czechoslovak Air Force operated ex-Luftwaffe Si 204s as well as Aero C-3s built in Czechoslovakia post war.
- Czechoslovak National Security Guard

France

- French Air Force operated ex-Luftwaffe Si 204s as well as NC.701s built in France post war.
- French Navy

Germany

- Luftwaffe

Hungary

- Hungarian Air Force operated six Aero C-3s from 1947 to 1953.

Poland

- Polish Air Force operated six NC.701s (received from LOT airlines) from 1949 to 1955 for aerial photography

Slovakia

- Slovak Air Force (1939–1945)

Switzerland

- Swiss Air Force

Soviet Union

- Soviet Air Force operated several captured Si 204.

=== Civil operators ===
Czechoslovakia

- ČSA operated post-war built Aero C-103s.

Germany

- Deutsche Luft Hansa operated at least four aircraft.

Netherlands

- Nationaal Luchtvaart Laboratorium (NLL) (NLL Dutch National Aeronautical Laboratory) operated one Si 204D-1 (BMM built) from 1946 till 1964, registered PH-NLL.

Poland

- Polskie Linie Lotnicze LOT operated in 1947–1948 six NC.701 bought in France. Aircraft were used for aerial photography and had markings from SP-LFA to LFF.

Sweden

- Rikets Allmänna Kartverk operated five NC.701 bought in France between 1962 and 1970 for mapping photography.

Soviet Union

- Aeroflot operated post war some captured Si 204 for transport duties.

Spain

- la Compañía Auxiliar de Navegación Aérea (CANA) operated two Siebel Si-204A aircraft, as EC-ACM (previously, EC-EAS) and EC-ADB (EC-EAM), which had belonged to the German embassy in Spain.

== Specifications (Si 204D) ==
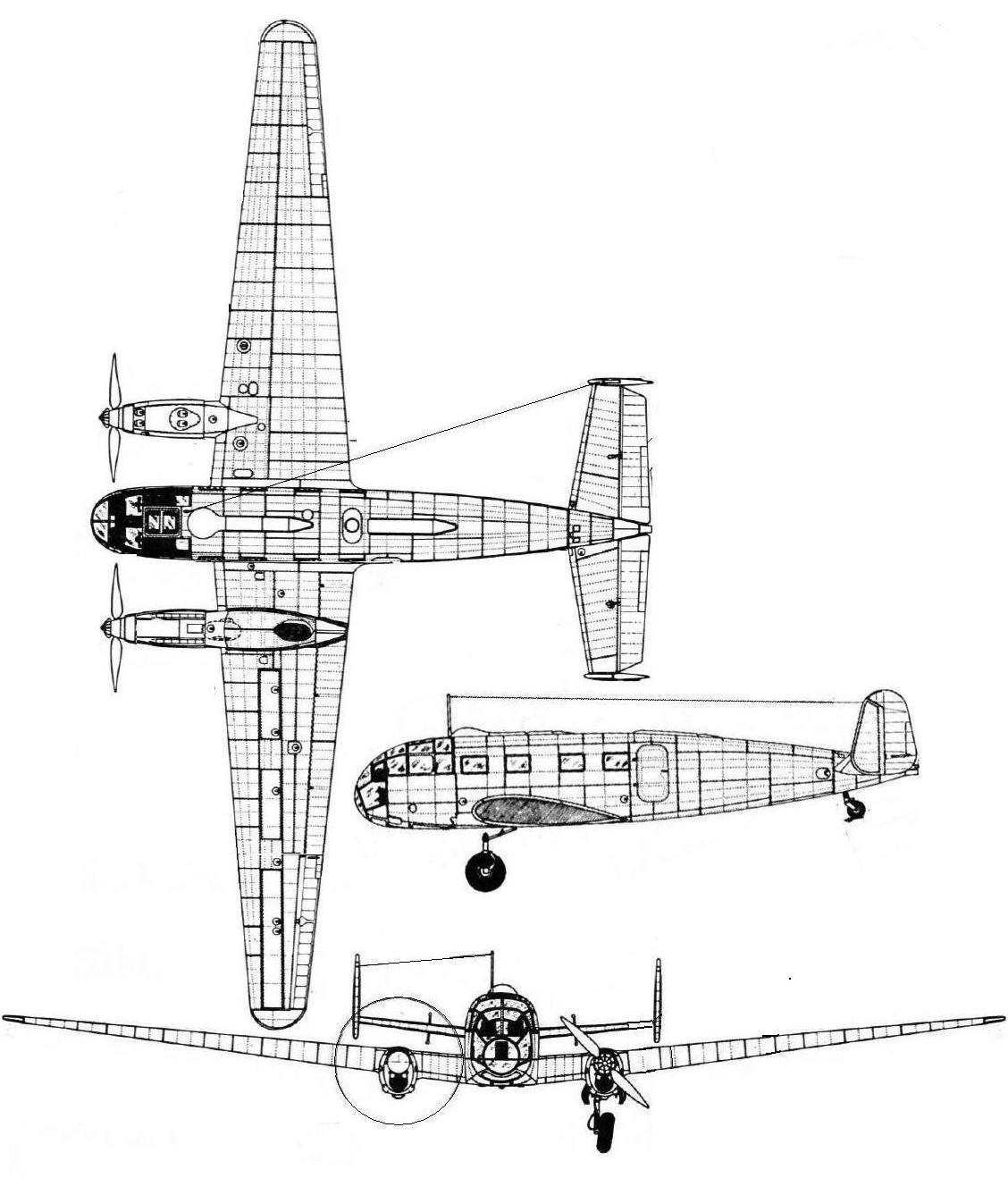
Aero C-3

Data from Die Deutsche Luftrüstung 1933–1945 Vol.4 – Flugzeugtypen MIAG-Zeppelin, German Aircraft of the Second World War

General characteristics

- Crew: 1 or 2
- Capacity: up to 8 passengers / 1,650 kg (3,638 lb) cargo
- Length: 11.95 m (39 ft 2 in)
- Wingspan: 21.33 m (70 ft 0 in)
- Height: 4.25 m (13 ft 11 in) to tip of radio mast
- Wing area: 46 m^{2} (500 sq ft)
- Empty weight: 3,950 kg (8,708 lb)
- Gross weight: 5,600 kg (12,346 lb)
- Fuel capacity: 890 L (240 US gal; 200 imp gal) fuel; 122 L (32 US gal; 27 imp gal) oil
- Powerplant: 2 × Argus As 411-A1 V-12 inverted air-cooled piston engines 600 PS (590 hp; 440 kW) for take-off
- Propellers: 2-bladed Argus Motoren wooden variable-pitch propellers, 2.69 m (8 ft 10 in) diameter

Performance

- Maximum speed: 364 km/h (226 mph, 197 kn) at 3,000 m (9,800 ft)
- Cruise speed: 340 km/h (210 mph, 180 kn)
- Range: 1,800 km (1,100 mi, 970 nmi)
- Service ceiling: 7,500 m (24,600 ft)
- Rate of climb: 6 m/s (1,200 ft/min)
- Time to altitude: 1,000 m (3,300 ft) in 3 minutes 18 seconds

Armament

- Guns: 1x machine-gun in a turret aft of the cockpit (Si 204E)
- Bombs: light bombs under the centre-section (Si 204E)

== See also ==
Related development

- Siebel Fh 104 Hallore
- SNCAC Martinet

Aircraft of comparable role, configuration, and era

- Avro Anson
- Beechcraft Model 18
- Cessna AT-17 Bobcat
- Tachikawa Ki-54

Related lists

- List of aircraft of World War II
