= Dassault MD 315 Flamant =

Twin-engine military transport aircraft

Flamant
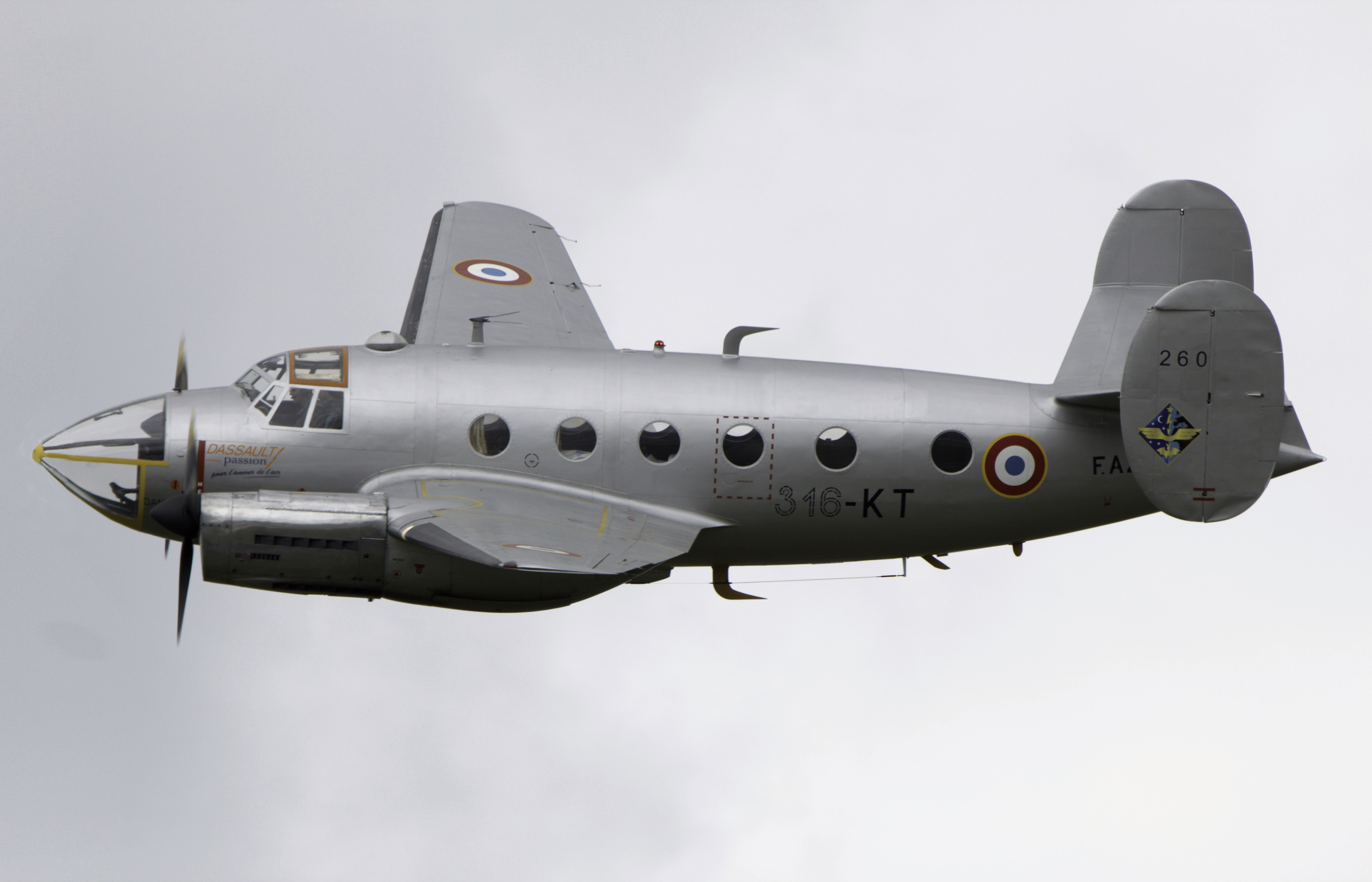
- Dassault Flamant at the 2010 ILA Berlin Air Show

General information
- Type: Military transport aircraft
- Manufacturer: Dassault Aviation
- Primary users: French Air Force Republic of Vietnam Air Force; Tunisian Air Force; Cambodian Air Force
- Number built: 325

History
- Introduction date: 1948
- First flight: 6 July 1947 (MD.315)
- Retired: 1981

The Dassault MD 315 Flamant is a French light twin-engined transport airplane built shortly after World War II by Dassault Aviation for the French Air Force.

== Design and development ==
Design work on a twin-engined light transport started in 1946 with the MD 303, a development of an earlier project for an eight-seat communications aircraft, the Marcel Bloch MB-30. The prototype MD 303 first flew on 26 February 1947 powered by two Béarn 6D engines, designed to meet a French Air Force requirement for a colonial communications aircraft. A re-engined version was ordered into production at the new Dassault factory at Bordeaux-Mérignac. The production aircraft was a low-wing monoplane with twin tail surfaces and a tricycle undercarriage, powered by two Renault 12S piston engines.

Three main versions of the aircraft now named Flamant (Flamingo in French) were produced. The MD 315 ten-seat colonial communication aircraft (first flown on 6 July 1947), the MD 312 six-seat transport aircraft (first flown on 27 April 1950), and the MD 311 navigation trainer (first flown on 23 March 1948). The MD 311 had a distinctive glazed nose for its role as both a bombing and navigation trainer.

== Operational history ==
The first Flamant was delivered to the French Air Force in 1949, and deliveries of all versions were completed by 1953.

The aircraft was used for pilot training, navigation training, light transport, maritime surveillance and light ground attack. During the Algerian War of Independence the plane was used for light attack with the Nord SS.11 and AS.11 anti-tank missiles or with machine guns, bombs, and rockets. The Flamant MD 311s (which were based in Algeria to train pilots and navigators at first) were the first aircraft in history to fire one of the world's first wire-guided anti-tank missiles in anger, using French Army SS.11 anti-tank missiles, in a combat experiment to get at fortified caves located in deep mountain gorges, in 1956 from an aircraft based with the special unit of the French Air Force in Algeria, GOM.86. The SS.11 attacks proved extremely successful and the French Army which had provided the missiles, began an experiment which resulted in the world's first attack helicopters firing antitank missiles. The Flamant stayed in service until 1981. In addition to the French air force, the Flamant served in Cambodia, Madagascar, Tunisia, and Vietnam.

== Variants ==
MB 30-1
Original proposals for a bombing and navigation trainer.
MB 30-2
Original proposals for a medical and colonial roles.
MB 30-3
Original proposals for a liaison and training aircraft.
MD 303

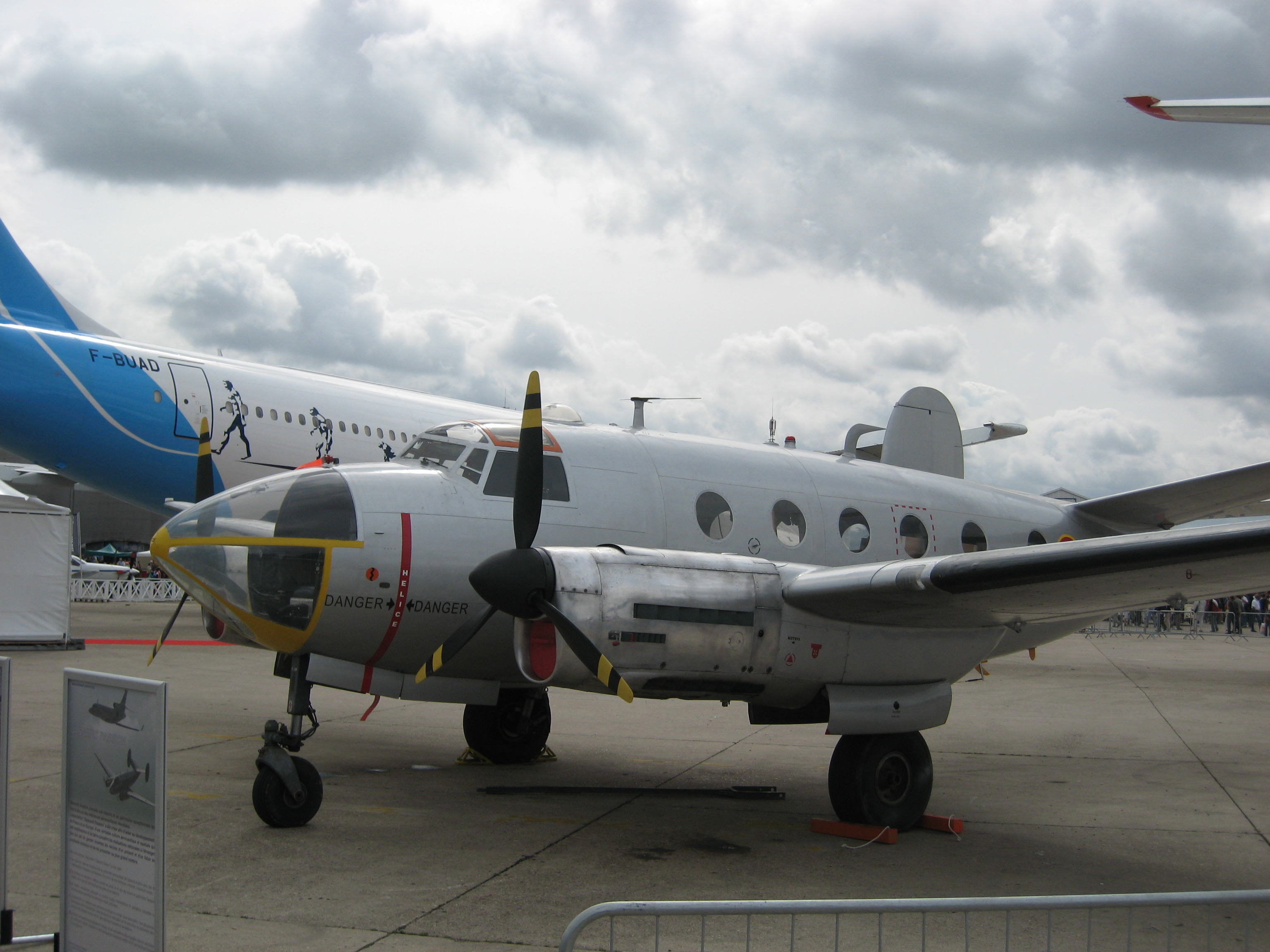
Dassault MD 311 Flamant trainer at the Paris Air Show 2007

Prototype, one built, powered by two 310 kW (410 hp) Béarn 6D engines.
MD 311
Bombing, navigation and photography training aircraft, 41 built (1 prototype + 40 production), powered by two 310 kW (410 hp) SNECMA 12S engines.
MD 312
Multi-engine pilot trainer and six-seat transport and communications aircraft, 118 built, powered by two 310 kW (410 hp) SNECMA 12S engines.
MD 312M
Utility aircraft for French Navy. 25 built.
MD 312B
Experimental version with a single fin, rectangular fuselage windows, and a heavier loaded weight. One built, powered by two 310 kW (410 hp) SNECMA 12S engines. Used later for Mirage IV radar development.
MD 315
Ten-seat utility transport aircraft, 137 built, powered by two 310 kW (410 hp) SNECMA 12S engines.
MD 316T
One prototype fitted with a single-finned tail, and two 600 kW (800 hp) Wright R-1300-CB7A1 Cyclone radial piston engines.
MD 316X
One MD 315 aircraft fitted with two 610 kW (820 hp) SNECMA 14X Super Mars radial piston engines.

== Operators ==
Cambodia

- Cambodian Air Force (MD 315)

Cameroon

- Cameroon Air Force (MD 315)

France

- French Air Force (MD 315, MD 312, MD 311)
- French Navy (MD 312)

Khmer Republic

- Khmer Air Force

Madagascar

- Madagascar Aeronaval Force (MD 315, MD 312)

Niger

- Niger Air Force (one MD 312 received in the 1960s)

South Vietnam

- Republic of Vietnam Air Force (MD 312, MD 315)

Tunisia

- Tunisian Air Force (MD 312)

== Specifications (MD 315) ==
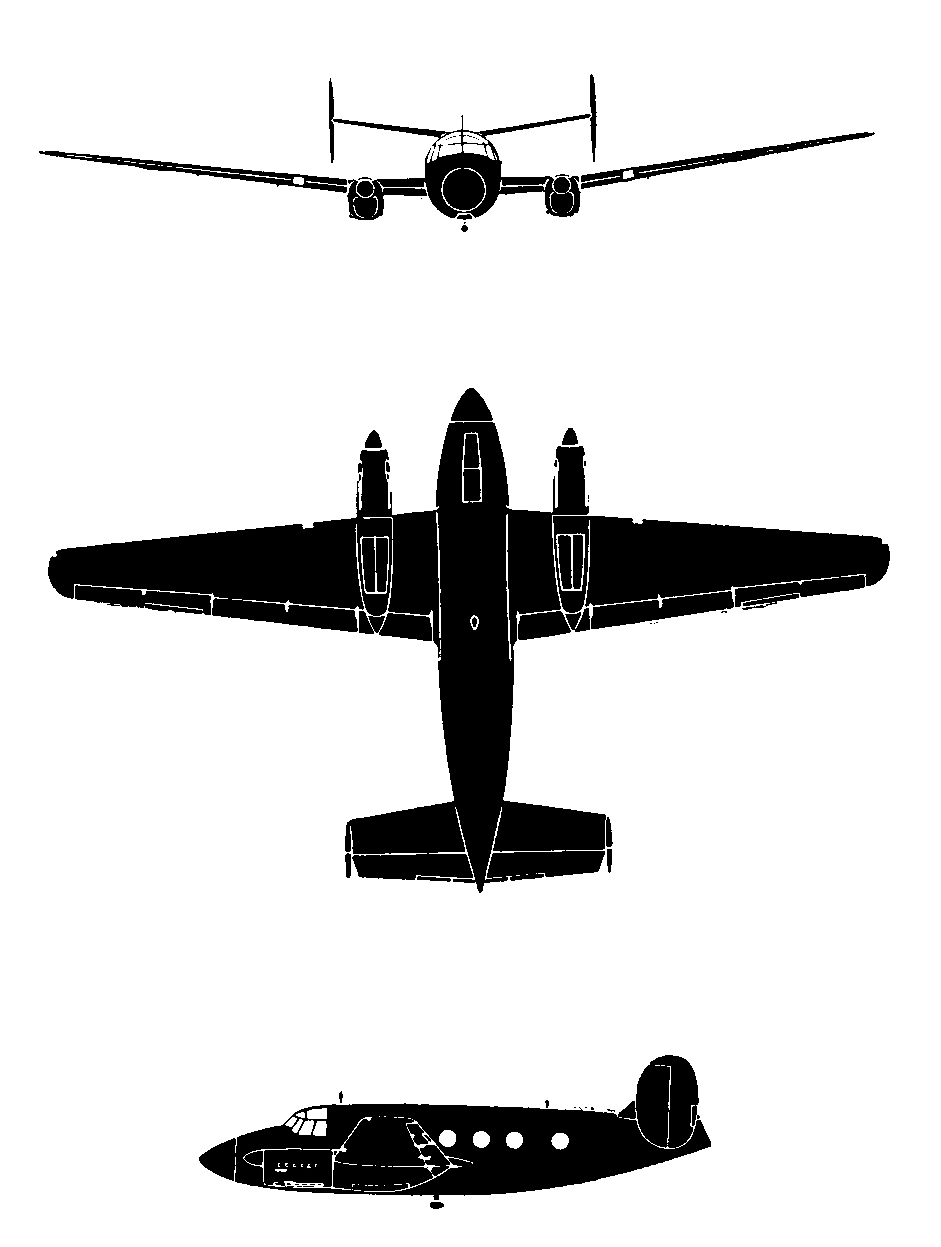
Dassault M.D.315 Flamant

Data from Jane's All The World's Aircraft 1953–54

General characteristics

- Crew: 2
- Capacity: 10 passengers
- Length: 12.50 m (41 ft 0 in)
- Wingspan: 20.70 m (67 ft 11 in)
- Height: 4.50 m (14 ft 9 in)
- Wing area: 47.2 m^{2} (508 sq ft)
- Aspect ratio: 8.9:1
- Empty weight: 4,250 kg (9,370 lb)
- Gross weight: 5,800 kg (12,787 lb)
- Powerplant: 2 × Renault 12S 02-201 air-cooled inverted V12 engines, 430 kW (580 hp) each

Performance

- Maximum speed: 380 km/h (240 mph, 210 kn)
- Cruise speed: 300 km/h (190 mph, 160 kn)
- Range: 1,200 km (750 mi, 650 nmi)
- Service ceiling: 8,000 m (26,000 ft)
- Rate of climb: 5.00 m/s (985 ft/min)
- Takeoff distance to 15 m (50 ft): 460 m (1,510 ft)

Armament

- Guns: 2 × .50 in (12.7 mm) Browning machine guns
- Hardpoints: 4 , with provisions to carry combinations of:
  - Rockets: 4 x 105 mm rockets or 4 x Matra launchers (7 x 68 mm rockets each)
  - Bombs: 4 x 50 kg (110 lb) bombs

== See also ==
- Military transport aircraft

Related lists

- List of military aircraft of France

== Bibliography ==
- Bridgman, Leonard (ed.) Jane's All The World's Aircraft 1953–54. London:Jane's, 1953.
- Chillon, Jacques; Dubois, Jean-Pierre & Wegg, John (1980). French Post-War Transport Aircraft. Tonbridge, UK: Air-Britain. ISBN 0-85130-078-2.
- Cuny, Jean (1989). Les avions de combat français, 2: Chasse lourde, bombardement, assaut, exploration [French Combat Aircraft 2: Heavy Fighters, Bombers, Attack, Reconnaissance]. Docavia (in French). Vol. 30. Ed. Larivière. OCLC 36836833.
- Francillon, René J. "Flamant — Dassault's Workhorse". Air Enthusiast, 49, March to May 1993. pp. 48–59.
