= Siebel Fh 104 Hallore =

1930s German light transport aircraft

Fh 104
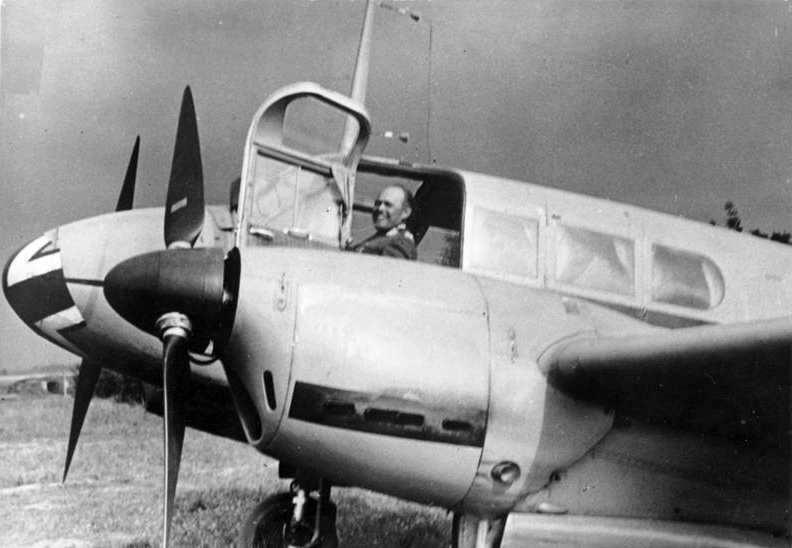
- An Fh 104 with Albert Kesselring at the controls

General information
- Type: Light transport, Communications, Liaison
- National origin: Germany
- Manufacturer: Siebel
- Primary user: Luftwaffe
- Number built: 46

History
- Manufactured: 1937–1942
- First flight: 1937
- Developed into: Siebel Si 204

The Siebel Fh 104 Hallore was a small twin-engined transport, communications and liaison aircraft designed by the German aircraft manufacturer Klemm Leichtflugzeugbau and produced by Siebel.

The Fh 104, which was originally designated Klemm Kl 104, represented a considerable departure from Klemm's previous aircraft designs, being largely composed of metals, such as duralumin, instead of wood and fabric. While the fuselage was mostly made of duralumin, the wing was primarily composed of wood. A new facility in Halle was built to produce the type, however, Klemm transferred control of the Halle factory to Fritz W. Siebel prior to quantity production commencing.

A pair of prototypes were produced, the first of which performed its maiden flight during 1937. Quantity production commenced one year later; sales of the type were augmented by the Fh 104's strong performance in several aerial competitions and long-distance circuits. The type was procured by both civilian and military operators, the Luftwaffe being a key customer. During the Second World War, Fh 104s were flown by the Luftwaffe in several capacities, including communication, liaison, and as the personal aircraft of various high ranking officials. During May 1942, production of the Fh 104 was ceased; by this point, the company had already put into production an enlarged derivative, the Siebel Si 204.

== Design and development ==
During 1934, the aircraft manufacturer Klemm Leichtflugzeugbau started work on a new production site at Halle; it was completed two years later. This facility was purpose-built for the production of all-metal aircraft (as opposed to Klemm's traditional light aircraft, which had been composed of wood and fabric instead) and thus was a major part of the company's next major project, the development and production of a new five-seat twin-engined light transport aircraft. This aircraft was originally designated Klemm Kl 104 prior to the type being redesignated Fh 104 and receiving the name Hallore.

In terms of its construction, a large proportion of the aircraft, including the fuselage and tail unit, were composed of duralumin while the exterior featured numerous clean lines. It was equipped with a hydraulically-actuated undercarriage, the two main legs of which retracted into the lower portion of the engine nacelles; wheels were typically fitted, but operators had the option of using skis instead. The cabin had a stepped windshield and was lined with windows. The Fh 104 was furnished with a low-mounted tapered wing, the structure of which centred around a pair of wooden spars and was covered with plywood. It was fitted with flaps while the tail unit featured a twin-part elevator and trim tabs. .

The FH 104 was developed to fulfil the same specification that would lead to the competing AGO Ao 192 and Gotha Go 146. During 1937, the prototype Fh 104 performed its maiden flight; a total of two prototypes were produced, differences between the two included a redesigned windscreen and a modified undercarriage. That same year, Klemm transferred control of the Halle factory to Fritz W. Siebel to focus on his other aviation activities based at Böblingen. It became known as the 'Hallore' after the name given to those born in that city.

During 1938, quantity production of the type commenced; differences between the prototypes and production standard aircraft included the adoption of the Hirth HM 508D V-8 piston engine along with the use of twin-blade variable-pitch propellers. In response to demand, the company opted to develop an enlarged derivative of the type, designated Siebel Si 204. In May 1942, production of the Fh 104 ceased in favour of concentrating resources on the larger and more popular Si 204 instead, a total of 46 aircraft were completed.

== Operational history ==
During 1938, the Fh 104 won multiple long distance flying competitions, including the principal award in the 1938 Littorio Rally. In the following year, one flew a 40,000 km circuit around Africa. These early high-profile wins stimulated sales of the type and encouraged production. At least 15 aircraft appeared on the pre-war German civil register.

During the Second World War, the aircraft was often used as a personal transport aircraft by several senior Wehrmacht officers and officials, including Adolf Galland, Albert Kesselring and Ernst Udet. Fh 104s were typically used for liaison and communication duties with various units of the Luftwaffe. During the final days of the conflict, one Fh 104 was flown by famous German pilot and entrepreneur Beate Uhse out of Berlin. The type continued to see use in the postwar era, one was used as the personal aircraft of Alois Vicherek, the chief-of-staff of the Czechoslovak Air Force.

== Operators ==
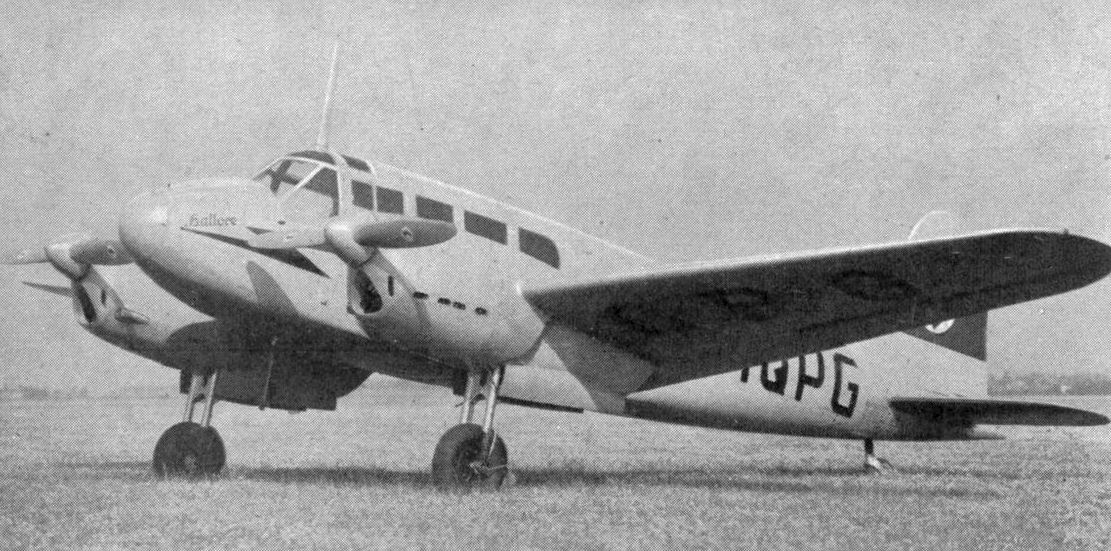
Siebel Fh.104 photo from L'Aerophile July 1937

Czechoslovakia

- Czechoslovak Air Force (postwar)

Nazi Germany

- Luftwaffe

Slovakia

- Slovak Air Force (1939–1945)

== Specifications (Fh 104A) ==
Data from German Aircraft of the Second World War, Jane's All the World's Aircraft 1938

General characteristics

- Crew: one or two
- Capacity: up to five passengers
- Length: 9.5 m (31 ft 2 in)
- Wingspan: 12.06 m (39 ft 7 in)
- Height: 2.58 m (8 ft 6 in)
- Wing area: 22.3 m^{2} (240 sq ft)
- Empty weight: 1,440 kg (3,175 lb)
- Gross weight: 2,250 kg (4,960 lb)
- Fuel capacity: 320 L (85 US gal; 70 imp gal) fuel; 25 L (6.6 US gal; 5.5 imp gal) oil
- Powerplant: 2 × Hirth HM 508D V-8 inverted air-cooled piston engines 280 PS (280 hp; 210 kW)
- Propellers: 2-bladed variable-pitch propellers, 2.35 m (7 ft 9 in) diameter

Performance

- Maximum speed: 350 km/h (220 mph, 190 kn) at sea level
- Cruise speed: 300 km/h (190 mph, 160 kn) at sea level

99 km/h (62 mph; 53 kn)

- Landing speed: 97 km/h (60 mph; 52 kn) at 2,500 m (8,200 ft)
- Range: 1,000 km (620 mi, 540 nmi) at 2,500 m (8,200 ft)
- Service ceiling: 6,600 m (21,700 ft)

1,600 m (5,200 ft) on one engie

- Rate of climb: 9.8 m/s (1,930 ft/min)
- Time to altitude: 1,000 m (3,300 ft) in two minutes and 48 seconds

3,000 m (9,800 ft) in 10 minutes and 42 seconds

- Wing loading: 101 kg/m^{2} (21 lb/sq ft)
- Power/mass: 0.159 kW/kg (0.097 hp/lb)

== See also ==
Related development

- Siebel Si 204
