= Arado Ar 96 =

Military training aircraft

Ar 96
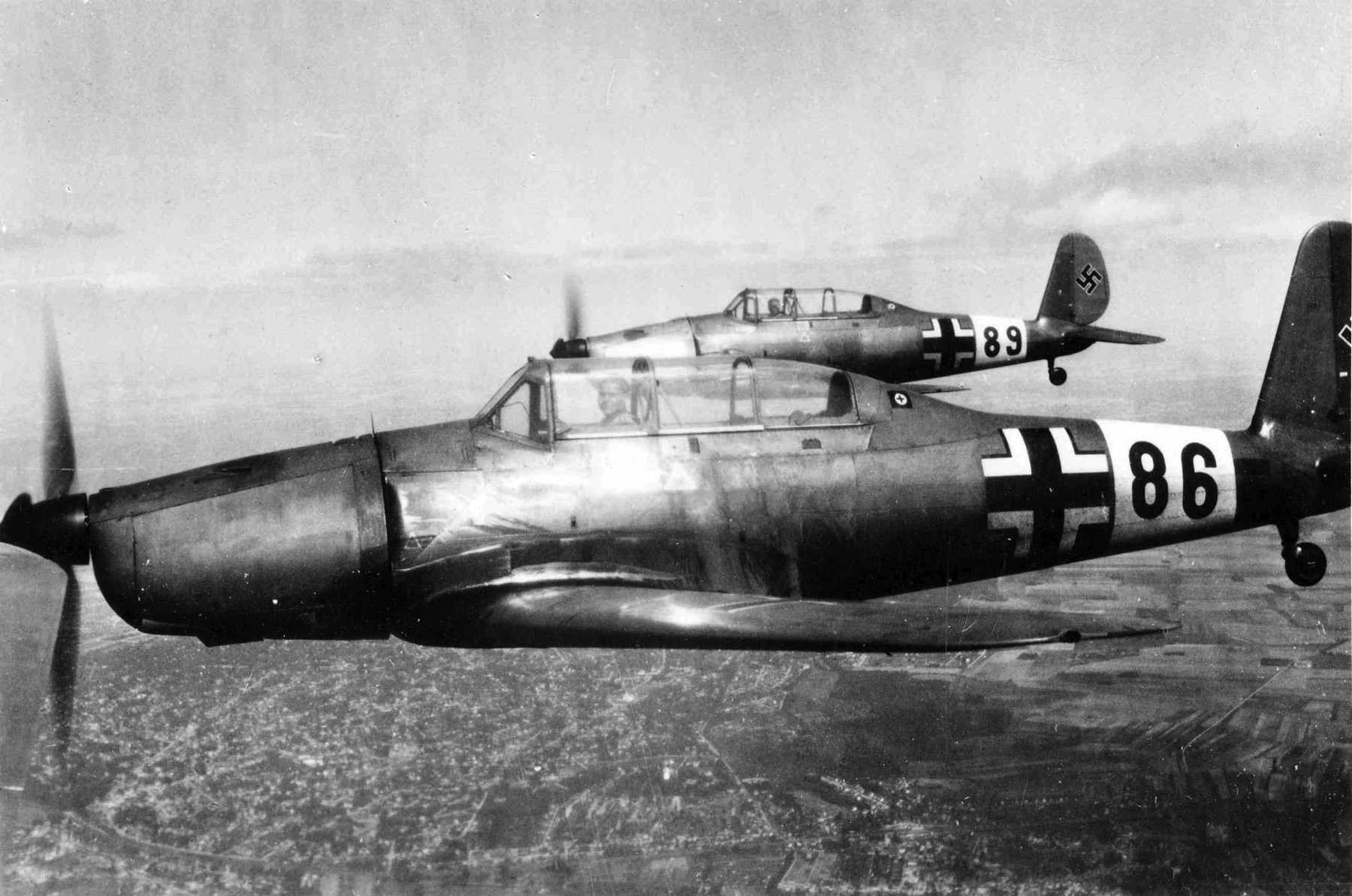
- Arado Ar 96Bs in echelon flight

General information
- Type: Military trainer
- National origin: Germany
- Manufacturer: Arado Flugzeugwerke
- Primary users: Luftwaffe Czechoslovak Air Force; Hungarian Air Force; Romanian Air Force
- Number built: 2,891

History
- Introduction date: 1939
- First flight: 1937

The Arado Ar 96 was a single-engine, low-wing monoplane of all-metal construction, designed and produced by the German aircraft manufacturer Arado Flugzeugwerke. It was the Luftwaffe's standard advanced trainer throughout the Second World War.

The Ar 96 was designed during the mid-1930s in response to a requirement issued by the Reichsluftfahrtministerium (RLM/German Aviation Ministry) for a modern trainer. Arado produced a new design suitable for conducting various forms of training, including advanced flying, aerobatics, aerial reconnaissance, night flying, and radio operator training. Various trainee-friendly features were present, including aerodynamically balanced flight control surfaces, widely-set landing gear, and automatically deploying flaps. In late 1936, the first prototype was completed; five more prototypes followed with various improvements, such as the use of a more powerful engine, variable-pitch propeller, and automated slats. The first batch of Ar 96A aircraft were delivered during late 1939.

By the end of 1940, the Ar 96 was becoming a common sight at many Germany pilot training schools, where they were often regarded as being relatively rugged, easy to fly and maintain, and technologically up-to-date aircraft. During the Battle of Berlin, on the evening of 28 April 1945, test pilot Hanna Reitsch flew with the Luftwaffe head Generalfeldmarschall Robert Ritter von Greim out from Berlin in an Ar 96. Arado continued to develop the type throughout the war, proposing various models as well as enacting various manufacturing changes to minimise production time as well as the use of strategic materials. Shadow production of the Ar 96 was undertaken by Letov and the Avia factory in occupied Czechoslovakia; they continued to manufacture the type for several years after the end of the conflict under the designation of Avia C-2B. A wooden version, known as the Ar 396, was built in France and was designated the SIPA S.10.

== Design and development ==
=== Background ===
The origins of the Ar 96 can be traced back to the mid 1930s and the shortcomings of the Focke-Wulf Fw 55W, a biplane floatplane intended for the trainer role. During early 1936, the Reich Air Ministry issued a tender to produce a modern trainer aircraft; Arado opted to produce its own response. A design team at the company, headed by the aeronautical engineer Walter Blume, promptly designed a monoplane aircraft that featured all-metal construction and a low-mounted cantilevered wing. It was designed with Arado's standard forward-set tailfin, which reduced the occurrence of spins. The aircraft was envisaged to perform standard training, night flying, aerobatics, radio operator training, aerial reconnaissance (using photogrammatical cameras) and even bombing missions.

To suit its principal use as a trainer, the design of the aircraft incorporated various safety features. All of the flight control surfaces were aerodynamically balanced and could be readily adjusted mid-flight. The flaps would automatically deploy (based on airspeed) if the trainee pilot forgot to do so. While the main landing gear and brakes were hydraulically powered, manual actuation via a hand pump was available in the event of a hydraulic failure.

In the autumn of 1936, the first prototype was completed. Modifications proved to be necessary; a continuous spar design replaced the tubular steel bridge arrangement initially used to link the wings, fuselage, and landing gear, while the horn counterbalance on the rudder was also eliminated. The outward-retracting landing gear was replaced by wider-tracked design to fulfil training safety requirements, while automatic slats were also added along with increased canopy glazing. The first prototype was initially powered by a single Argus As 10c engine, capable of producing up to 179 kW (240 hp).

=== Into flight ===
During 1937, testing of the first batch of prototypes proceeded positively; that same year, Ernst Udet, Chief of the Technical Office, T-Amt, (the development wing of the Reich Ministry of Aviation), flew one of the early Ar 96s. The second prototype incorporated numerous changes based on experiences of the first; the third prototype was equipped with the newly-developed Argus As 410 engine, which was initially capable of 360 hp (270 kW). This engine, along with the adoption of a variable-pitch propeller, was observed to have considerably increased the aircraft's performance. In mid-1938, the third and fourth prototypes were handed over to the E-Stelle Rechlin, the German test centre, for further testing.

During 1939, an initial batch of Ar 96A aircraft was produced; these largely resembled the sixth prototype, albeit being powered by the weaker Argus As 10 engine instead, largely due to insufficient numbers of As 410 engines being available at that time. This batch was subsequently followed by the Ar 96B, the first major production series, which were equipped the more powerful Argus As 410 engine.

=== Manufacturing arrangements and changes ===
Once quantity production of the type had been established, Arado's test group studied various means to more economically produce the aircraft; it was hoped that production time could be roughly halved from 110 hours to 60–65. One approach, aimed at reducing individual part count and shortening production time, involved the use of a hydraulic extrusion press and an electric roll welding process on the tailplane subassembly manufacture. This necessitated the use of large quantities of relatively expensive duralumin sheeting, as well as being a deviation from the semi-monocoque approach. One cost reduction was achieved via the use of smaller than standard panel sheeting. Increased automation and the use of snap riveting was also studied by the company.

By 1943, Germany's declining military situation and intense demands for key materials motivated Arado started development of a new derivative of the Ar 96 that made greater use of lower grade non-strategic metals and wood. The initial version, the Ar 296, proved to be unsatisfactory and thus did not reach quantity production. Instead, cooperation with other aircraft manufacturers on producing the aircraft was pursued.

During 1943, the French aircraft manufacturer Société Industrielle pour l'Aéronautique (SIPA) was ordered to build three Ar 396 prototypes and 25 pre-series aircraft. They made extensive use of wood and simplified construction wherever possible, even at the expense of aerodynamic refinements. However, development were deliberately constrained by the French, while the launch of the Allied invasion of France during the following year forced the Germans to shift production of the Ar 396 to Czechoslovakia instead. Accordingly, this work was undertaken by both Letov and the Avia factory in occupied Czechoslovakia, while considerations for another final assembly site in neighbouring Hungary was also considered. The first Czech-built example flew on 24 November 1944, with about 12 more examples completed by a consortium of several Czech manufacturers, headed by Avia. SIPA, meanwhile, continued work on its prototype after the German withdrawal from France, with the first French-built Ar 396, redesignated SIPA S.10, flying on 29 December 1944.

== Operational history ==
In late 1939, the first deliveries of Ar 96s to German flight training schools took place. The first Ar 96B-1s were delivered, the first properly-equipped trainers, followed months later. Unlike the following Ar 96B-2 model, all Ar 96B-1 aircraft were unarmed. The Ar 96 quickly became commonplace at fighter pilot schools, where they were typically used for advanced, night and instrument-flying training. They were frequently described as being relatively rugged, easy to fly and maintain, and technologically up to date.

During the Battle of Berlin, following orders given by Hitler shortly after midnight on 29 April 1945, test pilot Hanna Reitsch flew with then-Luftwaffe head Generalfeldmarschall Robert Ritter von Greim out from Berlin in an Ar 96 trainer from an improvised airstrip in the Tiergarten while under Soviet fire. Despite the end of the conflict in May 1945, manufacturing of the AR 96 continued for some years afterwards in the newly freed Czechoslovakia, where the type was locally designated as the Avia C-2B. French production of a model of the aircraft, under the local designation of SIPA S.10, also proceeded. Further developments included the SIPA S.11 (armed version), and the SIPA S.12, a metal version; 188 of all versions were produced until 1958. The S.11 was operated with some success in Algeria, where it was commonly armed with machine guns, rockets, and light bombs.

== Variants ==
Ar 96A
Two-seat advanced trainer aircraft. Initial production version.
Ar 96B
Improved version. Main production version.
Ar 96B-1
Unarmed pilot trainer version.
Ar 96B-2
Armed gunnery trainer.
Ar 96B-5
Largely identical to Ar 96B-2, but equipped with FuG ZY radio VHF set.
Ar 96C
Proposed ground-attack aircraft.
Ar 296
A proposed development of the Ar 96 with an Argus As 411 engine, abandoned in favour of the Ar 396, due to the use of non-strategic materials in the Ar 396 production.
Ar 396A-1
Single-seat gunnery trainer, powered by an Argus As 411 engine, built largely from wood. First flew 29 December 1944.
Ar 396A-2
Unarmed instrument trainer version.
SIPA S.10
French production version of Ar 396, 28 produced.
SIPA S.11
Modified version of S.10, powered by Renault 12S (French built Argus As 411), 50 built for the French Air Force.
SIPA S.12
All-metal version of S.11, 52 built for the French Air Force.

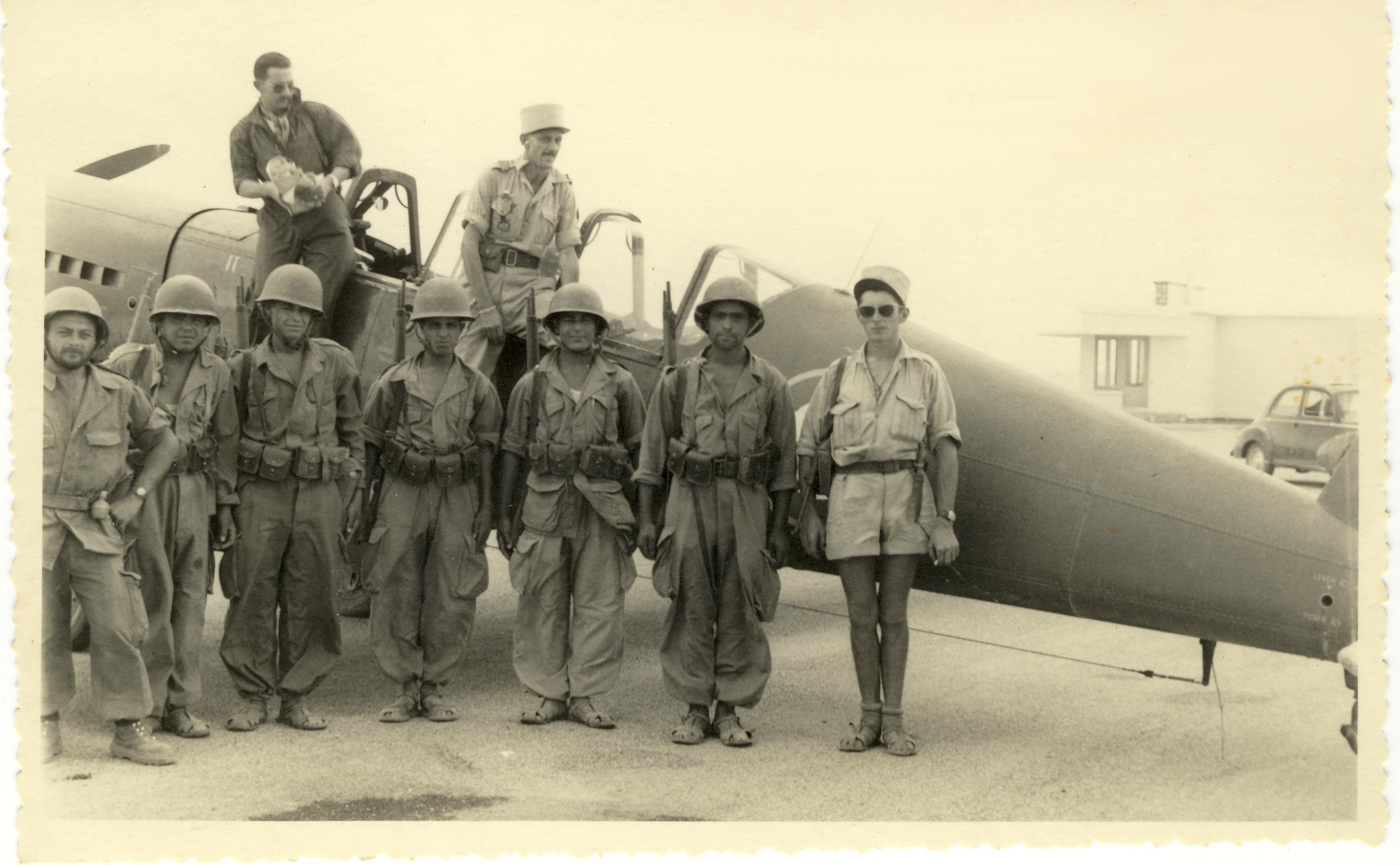
A French Air Force S.121 in 1956 during the Algerian War.

SIPA S.121
Modified version of S.12, 58 built for the French Air Force.
Avia C.2B
Czechoslovak production version of the Ar 96B. Czechoslovak designation C.2B. 228 built by Avia and 182 by Letov between 1945 and 1950.

== Production figures up to 1945 ==
Version	Arado	AGO	Avia	Letov	Total	Construction period
Prototypes	4				4	1937–1938
A-0	6				6	including 3 delivered on 1 April 1939, W.-Nr. 2879-2884
A	23	69			92	Mid 1939 – May 1940
B-0	2				2	1940
B-1	144	223	997	17	1,381	July 1940 – April 1944
B-3			210		210	1941–1943
B-6			100		100	July 1943 – January 1944
B-7			518	378	896	May 1944 – March 1945
B-7/B-8				81	81	December 1944 – March 1945
B-8				74	74	June 1944 – January 1945
Sales series	45				45	1939–1940
Total	224	292	1825	550	2891	

== Operators ==
Bulgaria

- Bulgarian Air Force – Bulgaria ordered 24 Ar 96Bs in 1939, which were delivered in 1940–1941. Some aircraft were captured in 1945 in Hungary and transferred to Bulgaria, including at last one Ar96-A version. After the war, Bulgaria received two Avia C.2s in 1948 from Czechoslovakia.

Czechoslovakia

- Czechoslovak Air Force operated Avia C-2 variant postwar.
- Czechoslovak National Security Guard

France

- French Air Force (Postwar)

Nazi Germany

- Luftwaffe

Hungary

- Hungarian Air Force

Slovakia

- Slovak Air Force (1939–1945)

== Surviving aircraft ==
- Arado Ar 96 B-1 – Deutsches Technikmuseum. Berlin, Germany.
- Arado Ar 96 B-1 – Flyhistorisk Museum. Sola, Norway.

== Specifications (Arado Ar 96B-2) ==

Data from Aircraft of the Third Reich Vol.1

General characteristics

- Crew: two
- Length: 9.1 m (29 ft 10 in)
- Wingspan: 11 m (36 ft 1 in)
- Height: 2.6 m (8 ft 6 in)
- Wing area: 17.1 m^{2} (184 sq ft)
- Empty weight: 1,295 kg (2,855 lb)
- Max takeoff weight: 1,700 kg (3,748 lb)
- Powerplant: 1 × Argus As 410A-1 inverted V-12 air-cooled piston engine, 347 kW (465 hp)
- Propellers: 2-bladed variable pitch metal propeller

Performance

- Maximum speed: 330 km/h (210 mph, 180 kn) at sea level
- Cruise speed: 295 km/h (183 mph, 159 kn)
- Range: 991 km (661 mi, 574 nmi)
- Service ceiling: 7,100 m (23,300 ft)
- Rate of climb: 5.08 m/s (1,000 ft/min)

Armament
1 × 7.92 mm (0.312 in) MG 17 machine gun

== See also ==
Aircraft of comparable role, configuration, and era

- AVIA FL.3
- Kyushu K10W
- Miles Master
- North American T-6 Texan

Related lists

- List of interwar military aircraft
- List of aircraft of World War II
- List of World War II military aircraft of Germany
- List of military aircraft of Germany
