= Argus As 411 =

German WWII model of aircraft engine

As 411
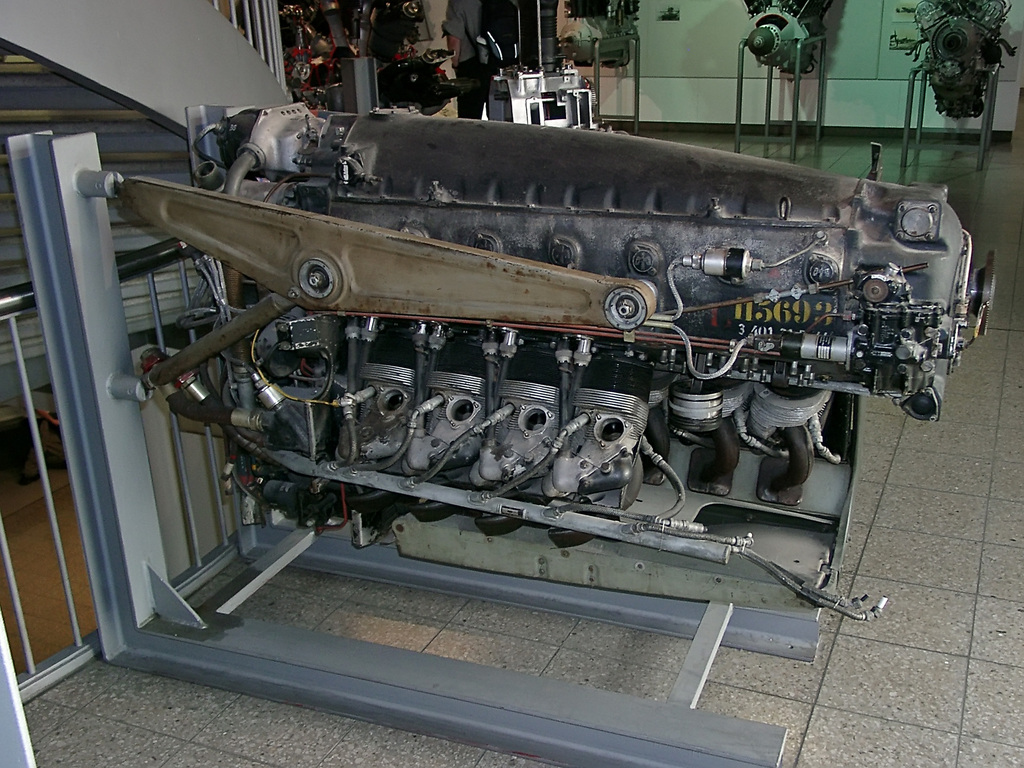
- Preserved Argus As 411
- Type: Piston aircraft engine
- Manufacturer: Argus Motoren
- Major applications: Arado Ar 96; Focke-Wulf Fw 189
- Number built: 2,600
- Developed from: Argus As 410

The Argus 411 was an air-cooled, inverted-V12 aircraft engine developed by Argus Motoren in Germany during World War II.

== Design and development ==
The As 411 was a refined and more powerful version of the Argus As 410. Most 411 production was undertaken by Renault in occupied Paris, these engines were used to power the Siebel Si 204 and the postwar Dassault MD 315 Flamant. It developed 600 PS (592 hp, 441 kW) at 3,300 rpm

Following the end of World War II, Renault continued to manufacture the engine as the Renault 12S. After the merger of the French aircraft engine manufacturers into SNECMA in 1945, production continued under the new designation SNECMA 12S.

== Variants ==
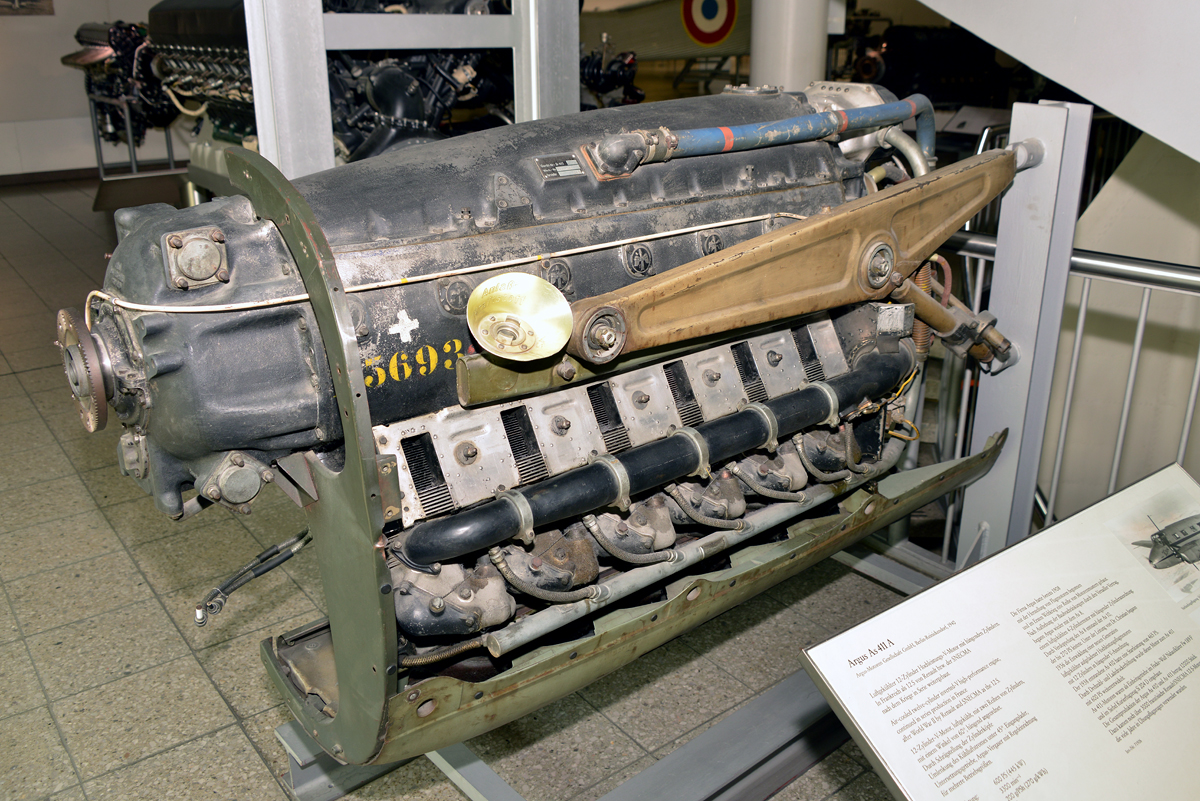
Argus As 411A in Deutsches Museum München

As 411
A refined and more powerful version of the Argus As 410.
Renault 12S
Production of the As 411 after World War II in France.
SNECMA 12S
(a.k.a. SNECMA Renault 12S) Designation change on the formation of SNECMA.
SNECMA 12T
(a.k.a. SNECMA Renault 12T) Refined version of the 12S with new pistons, cylinders and revised induction system.
SNECMA 12T-303
Dassault propeller
SNECMA 12T-312
Ratier propeller

== Applications ==
- Arado Ar 96
- Breguet 890 Mercure (4 × 12S)
- Dassault MD 315 Flamant
- Focke-Wulf Fw 189
- Fouga CM.100
- Pilatus P-2
- Siebel Si 204
- SNCAC NC.2001
- Sud Ouest S.O.93

== Specifications (SNECMA 12S) ==
Data from Aircraft engines of the World 1953

=== General characteristics ===
- Type: inverted 60-degree V12
- Bore: 105 mm (4.1 in)
- Stroke: 115 mm (4.5 in)
- Displacement: 12 L (730 cu in)
- Length: 1,620 mm (64 in)
- Width: 700 mm (28 in)
- Height: 992 mm (39.1 in)
- Dry weight: 369 kg (814 lb)

=== Components ===
- Valvetrain: One exhaust and one inlet valve per cylinder, push-rod operated.
- Supercharger: Gear driven centrifugal supercharger, 9.25:1 drive ratio.
- Fuel system: 1x Bronzavia 92-195A1 updraught carburetor with automatic boost and altitude control.
- Fuel type: 100/130 Aviation gasoline
- Oil system: Pressure fed 3.9 bar (57 psi)
- Cooling system: Air-cooled
- Reduction gear: Planetary reduction gear: 0.572:1
- Air equipment 50-920 electric inertia starter

=== Performance ===
- Power output:

Take-off:450 kW (600 hp) at 3,300 rpm / 1,325 mmHg (52.2 inHg) +5.0 kg (11.1 lb) boost
Normal:330 kW (440 hp) at 3,250 rpm at 2,400 m (7,900 ft)
Cruising, max:260 kW (350 hp) at 3,100 rpm at 2,600 m (8,500 ft)

- Specific power: 37 kW/L (0.82 hp/cu in)
- Compression ratio: 6.4:1
- Specific fuel consumption: 0.30 kg/kWh (0.5 lb/(hp⋅h))
- Oil consumption: 0.013 kg/kWh (0.022 lb/(hp⋅h))
- Power-to-weight ratio: 0.83 kg/kW (1.36 lb/hp)
- BMEP 13.6 bar (197 psi)

== See also ==
Comparable engines

- de Havilland Gipsy Twelve
- Ranger V-770

Related lists

- List of aircraft engines
