= Fouga =

French manufacturing company

- Industry: Aviation, Railway
- Founded: 1920
- Founder: Gaston Fouga
- Defunct: 1961
- Successor: Potez
- Headquarters: Béziers, France
- Area served: Worldwide
- Products: aircraft, rolling stock

Fouga (also known as Air Fouga) was a French manufacturing company established by Gaston Fouga at Béziers during 1920. Originally specialising in the repair of railway rolling stock, the firm eventually became most noted for the aircraft it produced from its woodworking facilities at Aire-sur-l'Adour.

The most successful product to be created by Fouga was the CM.170 Magister, a postwar jet-powered military trainer aircraft derived from the firm's experiences with sailplanes. Many of its features, such as its slender tapering wings, reflecting the company's sailplane heritage. During May 1958, Fouga was acquired by rival French aircraft manufacturer Potez; the company's former facilities at Toulouse continue to produce aircraft as a part of the multinational Airbus Group.

== History ==
During 1920, the company was established by Gaston Fouga; from the onset, it was based at the town of Béziers in the Occitanie region of Southern France. Initially, Fouga's operations centred around railway rolling stock.

During 1936, Fouga commenced aircraft manufacture using designs purchased from the aeronautical engineer Pierre Mauboussin, whom the firm also recruited, along with technical advice gathered from engineers working for rival French aircraft company Breguet Aviation . Mauboussin was joined by Robert Castello, formerly of the Dewoitine aviation company; both Mauboussin and Castello played a leading role in the firm, to the extent that many early of Fouga's designs have often been referred to as "Castel-Mauboussin". Even its later aircraft typically bore "CM" as part of their designations.

Fouga developed multiple aircraft designs specifically for the French Military in the years within and surrounding the Second World War. The CM.10 was an assault glider capable of carrying 35 troops that was specifically designed for the French Army. Flight trials with the CM.10 prototypes were of mixed results, the first prototype crashing on 5 May 1948 whilst being flown by CEV Brétigny. A production order for 100 was placed with Fouga, but was cancelled after only 5 gliders had been completed.

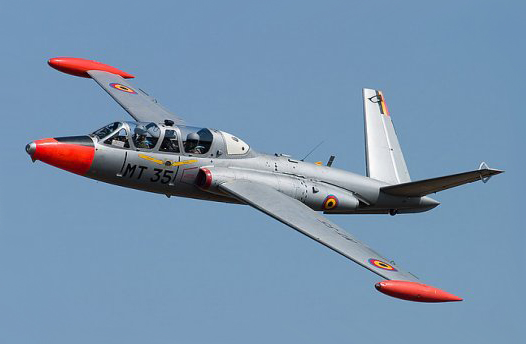
A Magister of the Belgian Air Force

During the postwar years, Fouga continued to pursue its own designs. During 1948, development commenced on a new primary trainer aircraft design that harnessed newly developed jet propulsion technology. The initial design, subsequently named the CM.170 Magister, was evaluated by the French Air Force (Armée de l'Air, AdA) and, in response to its determination that the aircraft lacked sufficient power for its requirements, was enlarged and adopted a pair of Turbomeca Marboré turbojet engines. First flying on 23 July 1952, the first production order for the type was received on 13 January 1954. Numerous export orders for the Magister were received, which included arrangements to produce the type under license in West Germany, Finland and Israel.

In addition, the related CM.175 Zéphyr was a carrier-capable derivative of the Magister developed and produced for the French Navy. On the back of the Magister's commercial success, the company established a new plant at Toulouse during 1953 specifically to handle its manufacture.

During May 1958, Fouga, along with all of its assets, were purchased by the rival aircraft manufacturer Potez; during late 1961, the Fouga name was formally dropped altogether. The remains of Potez and Fouga was subsequently incorporated into Sud-Aviation, later merged into the French aerospace conglomerate Aérospatiale, and then the multinational EADS corporation and then Airbus, which still operates major facilities at Toulouse.

== Products ==
- Fouga CM.8
- Fouga CM.10
- Fouga CM.88 Gemeaux
- Fouga CM.100
- Fouga CM.170 Magister
- Fouga CM.170M Esquif
- Fouga CM.171 Makalu
- Fouga CM.173 Super Magister
- Fouga CM.175 Zéphyr
- Potez-Heinkel CM.191
