= Fouga CM.10 =

French Army assault glider

CM.10
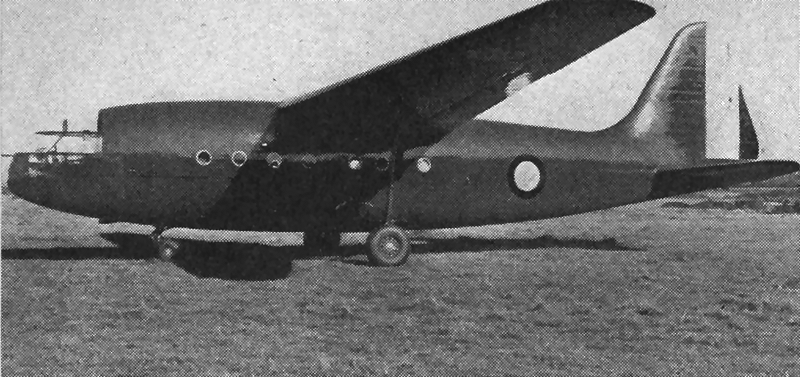

General information
- Type: Airliner
- Manufacturer: Fouga
- Designer: Robert Castello
- Number built: 7

History
- First flight: 7 June 1947

The Fouga CM.10 was an assault glider designed for the French Army shortly after World War II, capable of carrying 35 troops, later converted as a powered transport.

== Design and development ==
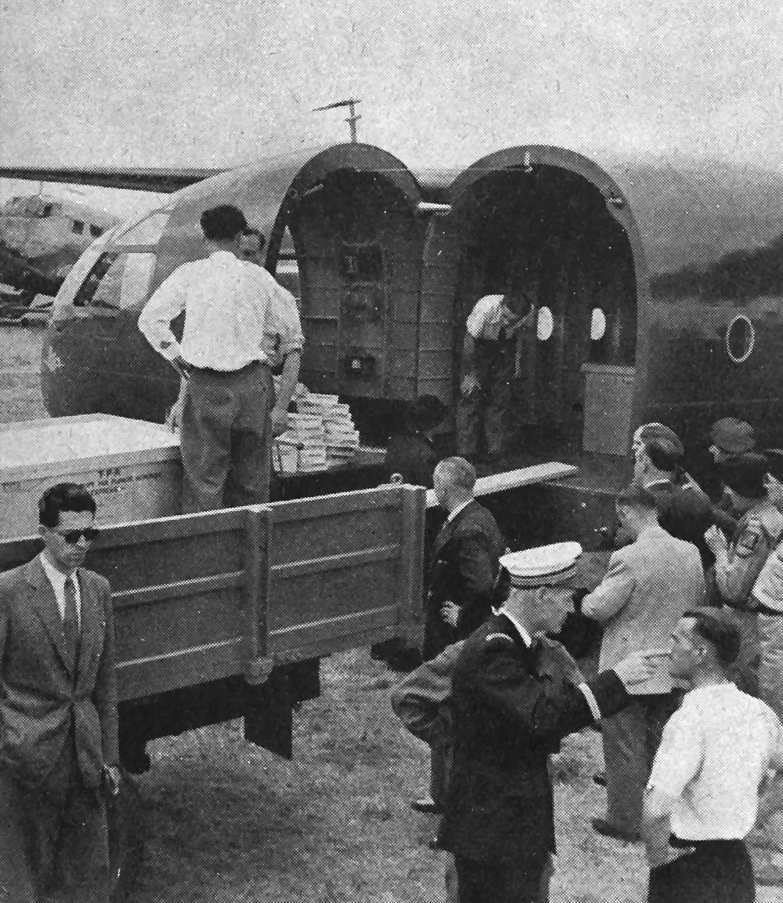
The cockpit pivots to provide access to the cargo hold..

The CM.10 was a high-wing cantilever monoplane of conventional configuration with fixed tricycle undercarriage. Flight trials with the glider prototypes were of mixed results with the first prototype crashing on 5 May 1948 whilst being flown by CEV Brétigny. A production order for 100 was placed with Fouga, but cancelled after only 5 gliders had been built.

Undaunted, Fouga adapted the design as an airliner, adding two SNECMA 12S piston engines. Two of the production CM.10 gliders were converted to the powered version, CM.100-01, the first prototype (registration F-WFAV), was first flown on 19 January 1949, but no order resulted for this aircraft. It was later tested with Turbomeca Piméné turbojets mounted on the wingtips as the CM.101R-01. The second aircraft, which was converted as CM.101R-02, (registration F-WFAV), was first flown on 23 Aug 1951.

== Variants ==
CM.10
The original assault glider design, two prototypes built; CM.10-01, first flight 7 June 1947 at Mont de Marsan, crashed on 5 May 1948 whilst on trials at CEV Brétigny; CM.10-02 was first flown in late 1948. Production orders for 100 were cancelled after five gliders were built.
CM.100
Two CM.10 production gliders powered by two SNECMA 12S-02 engines in nacelles on each wing.
CM.101R
The two CM.100s fitted with auxiliary Turbomeca Piméné turbojets on the wing-tips.
CM.103R

A proposed military transport derivative with Turbomeca Marboré wing-tip auxiliary turbojets.

== Specifications (CM.100) ==
Data from

General characteristics

- Crew: two pilots
- Capacity: 15 passengers / 2,033 kg (4,482 lb) freight

CM.10 - 35 troops (1 x crew) / 3,500 kg (7,716 lb) freight

- Length: 17.9 m (58 ft 9 in)
- Wingspan: 26.7 m (87 ft 7 in)
- Wing area: 71.9 m^{2} (774 sq ft)
- Empty weight: 2,833 kg (6,246 lb)
- Gross weight: 6,420 kg (14,154 lb)
- Cargo hold capacity: 32 m^{3} (1,130 cu ft)
- Powerplant: 2 × SNECMA 12S-02 inverted V-12 air-cooled piston engines, 433 kW (581 hp) each
- Propellers: 3-bladed variable-pitch propellers

Performance

- Maximum speed: 280 km/h (170 mph, 150 kn)
- Cruise speed: 246 km/h (153 mph, 133 kn) at 1,500 m (4,900 ft)
- Range: 1,000 km (620 mi, 540 nmi) with 14 passengers and 182 kg (401 lb) baggage

== See also ==
Aircraft of comparable role, configuration, and era

- Chase YCG-14
- Airspeed Horsa
