= SNCASO Deltaviex =

Deltaviex
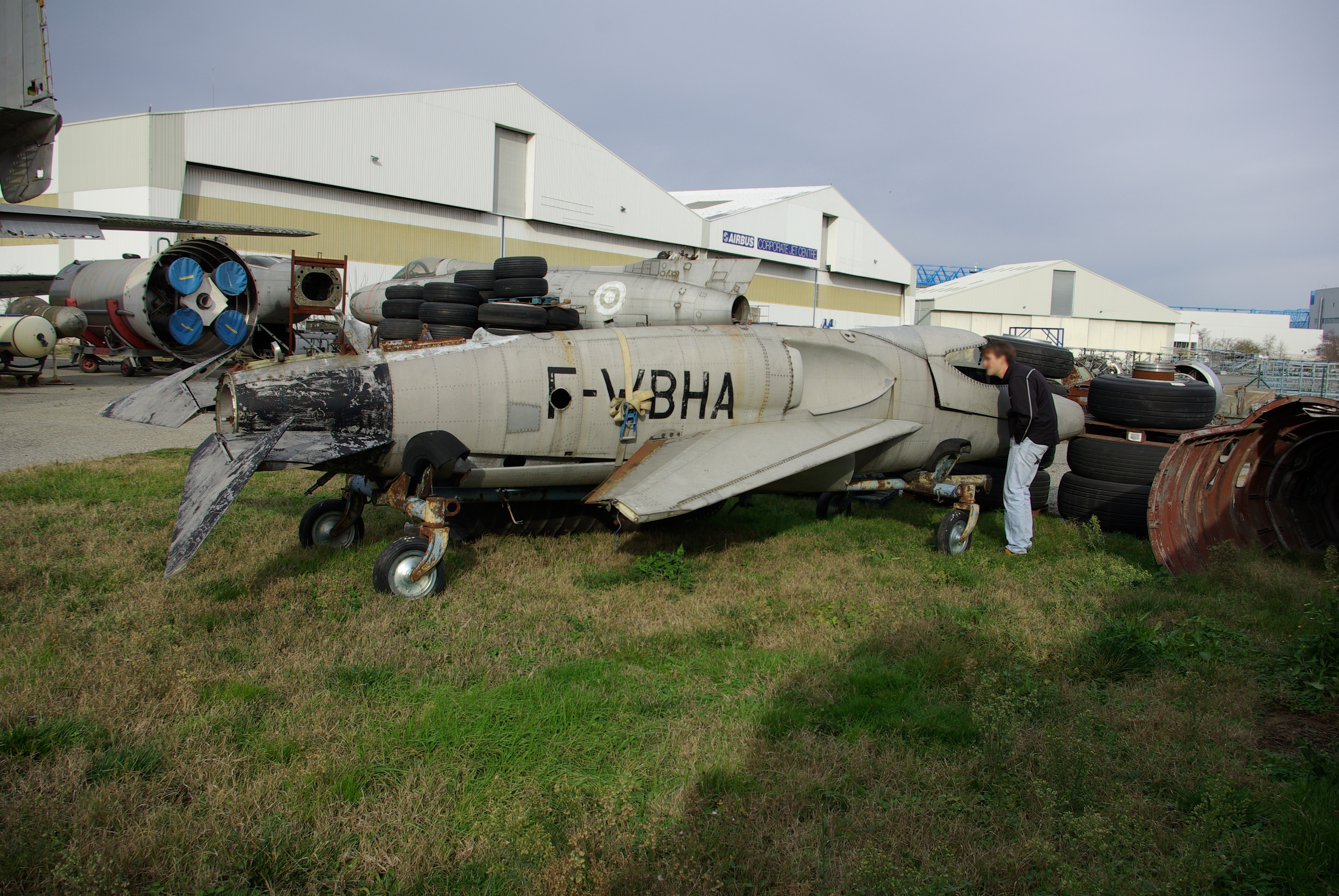
- Awaiting restoration at Toulouse, 2008

General information
- Type: experimental aircraft
- National origin: France
- Manufacturer: SNCASO
- Designer: Alliet at ONERA
- Number built: 1

History
- First flight: 30 April 1954

The SNCASO Deltaviex or SNCASO-ONERA Deltaviex was a small French experimental jet aircraft, first flown 30 April 1954 and distinguished by highly swept, small span wings. It was designed to explore the possibility of controlling roll and yaw with fine jets of air bled from the engine's compressor.

== Design and development ==
The Deltaviex, its name derived from the Delta VX design of Alliet at ONERA and built by SNCASO at Courbevoie, was intended to explore lateral control by blown flaps instead of ailerons. Despite its name it did not have a delta wing but wings which were strongly swept and straight tapered to pointed tips. The leading edge sweep was 70°, that of the trailing edge about 40° and the thickness to chord ratio less than 6%.

The wing trailing edges carried flaps from the wing roots almost to the tips and these were blown with air bled from the centrifugal compressor of the Deltaviex's Turbomeca Marboré gas turbine engine, exiting the flap trailing edges via 700 μm (0.028 in) holes. There were also more conventional ailerons, though they were unusual in that they were irregular quadrilaterals in shape and formed the wing tips.

Yaw was similarly controlled by passing more of the compressor bleed out though fine holes in the tall fin, which was swept on both edges and straight tapered to a squared-off tip; there was no rudder. The horizontal tail was likewise straight edged and swept, though its trailing edge was less strongly swept than that of the wing. Its tailplanes were triangular and the elevators balanced.

The fuselage of the Deltaviex was more conventional. It was round in cross section, with a pointed nose and air intakes on is upper flanks over the wings for the low power (3.92 kN (880 lbf)) Marboré engine which exhausted through a tail pipe. The original canopy over its single seat cockpit was raised above the rear fuselage line and had single oval windows both on the sides and as a windscreen. The oval shape made the lower forward window frames broad close to the fuselage, limiting the pilot's view and the cockpit was modified at least once in the period 1954–6, leading to more conventional glazing with straight lower edges and thin windscreen frames. The Deltaviex had conventional tricycle landing gear, with the narrow track mainwheels retracting into the fuselage.

== Development ==
The Deltaviex was first flown 30 April 1954 by Robert Fouquet, followed by a period of testing and modification at the ONERA's airfield at Brétigny-sur-Orge. Details of the development are sparse but photographs from the later stages show the revised cockpit and also the addition of a rectangular ventral fin in place of a tail bumper wheel used in the early tests. The first flight with the blown flaps was made on 21 September 1955. The aircraft received no publicity for two years until it appeared with other SNCASO aircraft at a Brétigny-sur-Orge press event on 8 November 1956. Shortly afterwards, Flight reported it was soon to be scrapped.

Because the Deltaviex's span was so small (3.5 m (11 ft 6 in), it was possible to fit the whole aircraft into existing supersonic wind tunnels. Its testing in ONERA's tunnel at Meudon is well recorded and after the flight tests were over it went to another ONERA tunnel at Modane.

== Aircraft on display ==
After these final tests the airframe was acquired as a feature by a local garage then retrieved in 1984 by members of the historic aircraft preservation group Ailes Anciennes Toulouse who have gradually restored it. In 2015 it is largely complete externally, though with much still to be done.

== Specifications ==
Data from Ailes Anciennes Toulouse

General characteristics

- Crew: one
- Length: 7.1 m (23 ft 4 in)
- Wingspan: 3.4 m (11 ft 2 in)
- Height: 2.5 m (8 ft 2 in)
- Empty weight: 555 kg (1,224 lb)
- Max takeoff weight: 920 kg (2,028 lb)
- Powerplant: 1 × Turbomeca Marboré II centrifugal flow gas turbine, 3.92 kN (880 lbf) thrust

Performance

- Maximum speed: 400 km/h (250 mph, 220 kn)
- Range: 300 km (190 mi, 160 nmi)

== Bibliography ==
- Buttler, Tony and Jean-Louis Delezenne. X-Planes of Europe: Secret Research Aircraft from the Golden Age 1946-1974. Manchester, UK: Hikoki Publications, 2012. ISBN 978-1-902-10921-3
