= Fouga CM.175 Zéphyr =

1959 trainer aircraft model

CM.175 Zéphyr
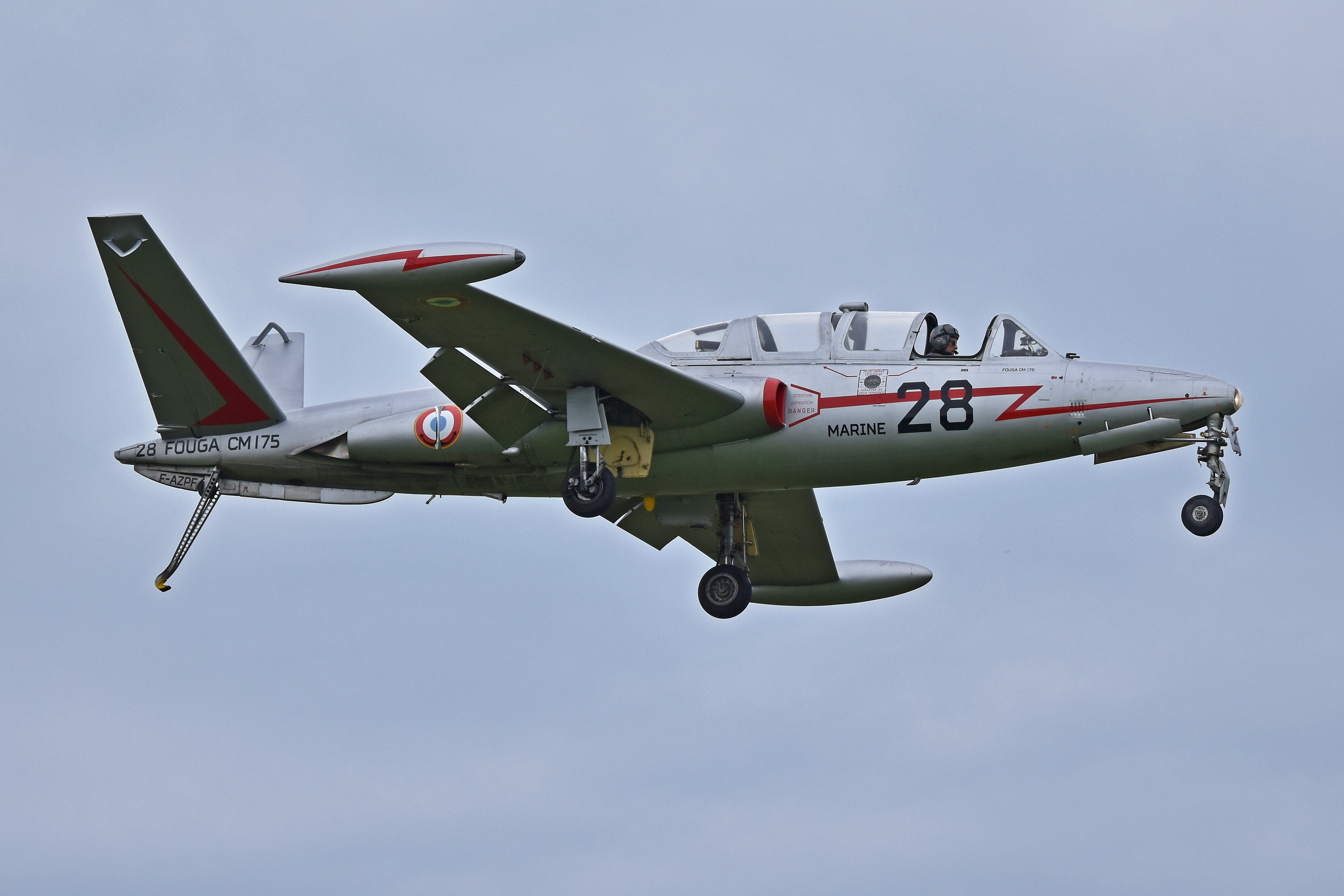
- A Fouga CM.175 Zéphyr in French Navy colours

General information
- Type: Carrier-capable jet trainer
- National origin: France
- Manufacturer: Fouga
- Primary user: French Navy
- Number built: 32

History
- Introduction date: 1959
- First flight: 31 July 1956 (as CM.170M)
- Retired: 1994
- Developed from: Fouga CM.170 Magister

The Fouga Zéphyr (company designation CM.175) was a 1950s French two-seat carrier-capable jet trainer for the French Navy. It was developed from the land-based CM.170 Magister. The Zéphyr was retired in 1994.

== Design and development ==
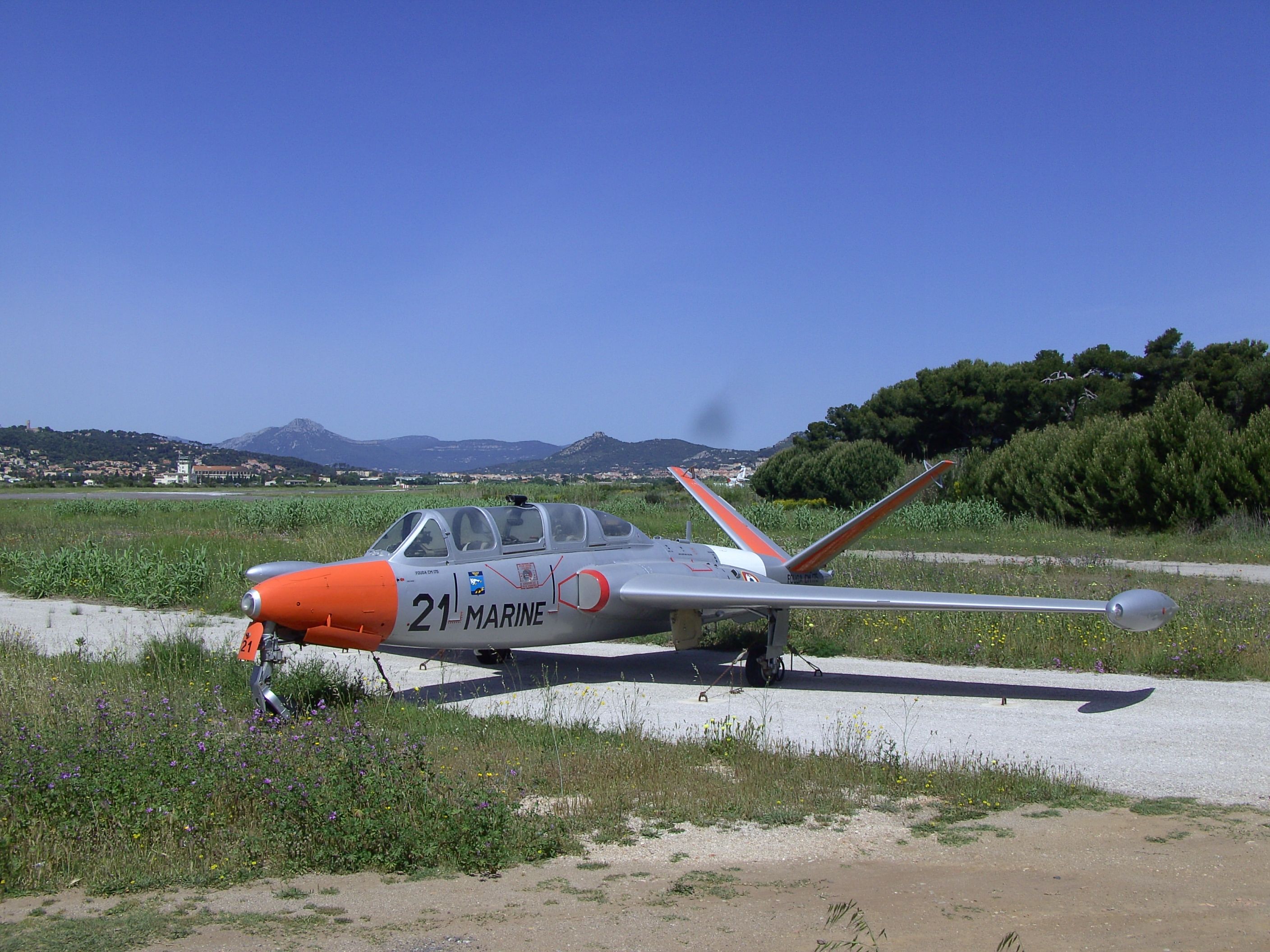
Fouga CM.175 Zéphyr at Toulon-Hyères Airport

The French Navy's Aéronavale adopted a derivative of the Fouga CM.170-1 Magister as a basic trainer for carrier operations. Originally designated CM-170M Esquif, the prototype first flew on 31 July 1956, and was redesignated as the CM.175 Zéphyr soon after. Carrier trials were conducted from HMS Eagle (R05) and HMS Bulwark (R08) off the French coast in August 1957 and March 1958.

The Zéphyr differed from the Magister in being equipped with an arrester hook and a modified structure and undercarriage strengthened for carrier operations. The Zéphyr also included a nose-mounted light. As it did not have ejection seats, the Zéphyr had new sliding canopy hoods which could be locked open during carrier launchings and landings. One six-round rocket pod could be mounted under each wing for weapons training. Two guns could be fitted in the nose, but these were seldom carried. Thirty-two aircraft were delivered.

== Operational history ==
The first production aircraft first flew on 30 May 1959 and entered service in October 1959 with 59S the deck landing school at Hyéres. The squadron used only 14 aircraft at a time with the others being kept in short-term storage and periodically rotated to even out the flying hours. In 1962 the unit formed an aerobatic team using the Zéphyr called the Patrouille de Voltige d'Hyéres.

== Variants ==
- CM-170M Esquif - prototype; 2 built.
- CM.175 Zéphyr - production version; 30 built.

== Operators ==
France

- French Navy
  - 59 Escadrille de Servitude

== Specifications (CM.175) ==
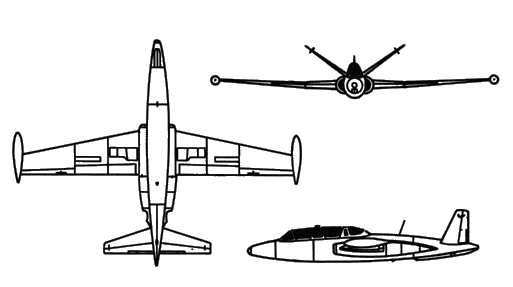
Orthographic projection of the Fouga Magister.

Data from Carrier Aviation Air Power Directory

General characteristics

- Crew: 2
- Length: 10.06 m (33 ft 0 in)
- Wingspan: 12.15 m (39 ft 10 in) (with wingtip fuel tanks)
- Height: 2.80 m (9 ft 2 in)
- Wing area: 17.30 m^{2} (186.2 sq ft)
- Empty weight: 2,150 kg (4,740 lb)
- Max takeoff weight: 3,200 kg (7,055 lb)
- Powerplant: 2 × Turbomeca Marboré IIA turbojets, 3.92 kN (882 lbf) thrust each

Performance

- Maximum speed: 715 km/h (444 mph, 386 kn) at 9,000 m (30,000 ft)
- Range: 925 km (575 mi, 499 nmi)
- Service ceiling: 11,000 m (36,000 ft)

Armament

- 2 x 7.5 mm or 7.62 mm machine guns (seldom carried)
- Up to 100 kg (220 lb) of weapons on two underwing hardpoints.

== See also ==
- List of military aircraft of France
- List of carrier-based aircraft

Related development

- Fouga CM.170 Magister

Aircraft of comparable role, configuration, and era

- Grumman F9F-8T/TF-9J Cougar
- Lockheed T2V/T-1 SeaStar
- North American T-2 Buckeye
