= Windstar YF-80 =

Homebuilt aircraft

YF-80

General information
- Type: Homebuilt aircraft
- National origin: United States
- Manufacturer: Windstar

The Windstar YF-80 is an American single-seat homebuilt replica of the Lockheed F-80. By 1987, the project was not complete, resulting in a court case between investors. The prototype was re-engined with a Turbomeca Marboré II turbine engine, as the Stargate YT-33.

== Design and development ==
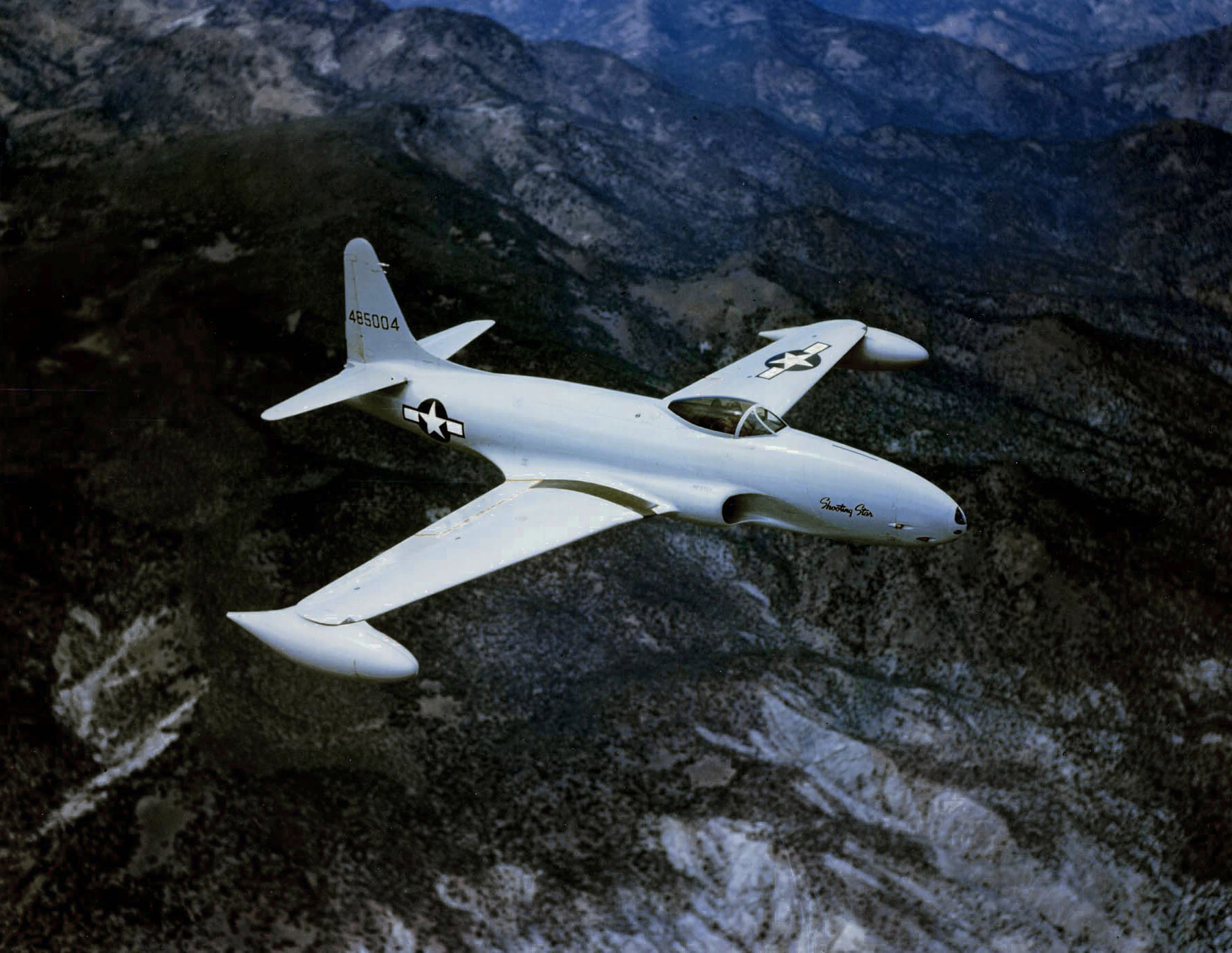
A Lockheed F-80, which the YF-80 fuselage is modeled after

The YF-80 is a two-thirds scale replica of a Lockheed F-80 or T-33. The aircraft is a composite-construction, single-engine, low-wing design, with retractable tricycle landing gear. The tip tanks are removable for aerobatic flight. The aircraft is powered by a Chevy 350 V-8 turbocharged engine driving a turbine thrust section. The thrust section is driven by belts with high gear ratios to drive the turbine closer to the rotational speed it was originally designed for.

The aircraft project was intended to showcase the Davis engine technology, with a static prototype displayed in 1977. Burt Rutan was approached to build the composite fuselage, but the US$240,000 cost estimate was declined. Davis attempted to produce a production prototype fuselage for US$80,000.

== Stargate YT-33 ==
YT-33

General information
- Type: Homebuilt aircraft
- National origin: United States
- Manufacturer: Stargate, Inc.
- Status: Production completed (1994)
- Number built: One

History
- Retired: 2018
- Developed from: Lockheed T-33; Windstar YF-80

The Stargate YT-33 is an American turbine powered prototype homebuilt aircraft that was designed and intended to be produced by Stargate, Inc., of McMinnville, Oregon. It was introduced in 1994. The aircraft is a 2/3 scale replica of the Lockheed T-33 jet trainer. Listed as "under development" in 1998, the YT-33 was planned to be supplied as a kit for amateur construction, but it is unlikely any kits were ever shipped.

=== Design and development ===
The YT-33 features a cantilever low wing, a two-seats-in-tandem enclosed cockpit under a bubble canopy, retractable tricycle landing gear, and a single jet engine.

The aircraft is made from composite material. Its 26.67 ft (8.1 m) span wing has a wing area of 110.0 sq ft (10.22 m^{2}). The prototype uses a 880 lbf (3.9 kN) thrust Turbomeca Marboré IIC jet powerplant.

The aircraft has a typical empty weight of 2,205 lb (1,000 kg) and a gross weight of 2,920 lb (1,320 kg), giving a useful load of 715 lb (324 kg). The aircraft has a fuel capacity of 200 U.S. gallons (760 L; 170 imp gal) or 1,358 lb (616 kg) of Jet-A.

The ISA standard temperature, sea-level, no-wind, take-off distance is 2,000 ft (610 m), and the landing roll is 3,000 ft (914 m).

The manufacturer estimated the construction time from the proposed kit to be 3000 hours.

== Operational history ==
By 1998, the company reported that one YT-33 had been completed and was flying. On April 18, 2018 the one example that had been registered in the United States with the Federal Aviation Administration was de-registered; the aircraft may not exist any longer.

== Specifications ==
=== YF-80 ===
Data from Jane's all the world's aircraft, 1978-79

General characteristics

- Crew: 1
- Length: 17 ft 3 in (5.26 m)
- Wingspan: 18 ft 6 in (5.64 m)
- Height: 6 ft 1 in (1.85 m)
- Empty weight: 899 lb (408 kg)
- Max takeoff weight: 1,301 lb (590 kg) with internal fuel only
- Fuel capacity: 132.5 liters (35 US gallons)
- Powerplant: 1 × Davis Cold Jet hybrid piston turbine, 220 lbf (0.98 kN) thrust @ 75% power

Performance

- Maximum speed: 261 kn (300 mph, 483 km/h)
- Stall speed: 70 kn (80 mph, 129 km/h) with flaps down
- Range: 425 nmi (490 mi, 788 km) with internal fuel only
- Service ceiling: 20,000 ft (6,100 m)
- g limits: +6/-3
- Rate of climb: 2,600 ft/min (13 m/s) with internal fuel only

=== YT-33 ===
Data from AeroCrafter

General characteristics

- Crew: one
- Capacity: one passenger
- Length: 25 ft 10 in (7.87 m)
- Wingspan: 26 ft 8 in (8.13 m)
- Wing area: 110.0 sq ft (10.22 m^{2})
- Aspect ratio: 6.6:1
- Empty weight: 2,205 lb (1,000 kg)
- Gross weight: 2,920 lb (1,324 kg)
- Fuel capacity: 200 U.S. gallons (760 L; 170 imp gal)
- Powerplant: 1 × Turbomeca Marboré IIC jet aircraft engine, 880 lbf (3.9 kN) thrust

Performance

- Maximum speed: 325 mph (523 km/h, 282 kn)
- Cruise speed: 300 mph (480 km/h, 260 kn)
- Stall speed: 75 mph (121 km/h, 65 kn)
- Range: 1,200 mi (1,900 km, 1,000 nmi)
- Service ceiling: 30,000 ft (9,100 m)
- Rate of climb: 1,500 ft/min (7.6 m/s)
