= Fouga CM.170 Magister =

French jet trainer aircraft

CM.170 Magister
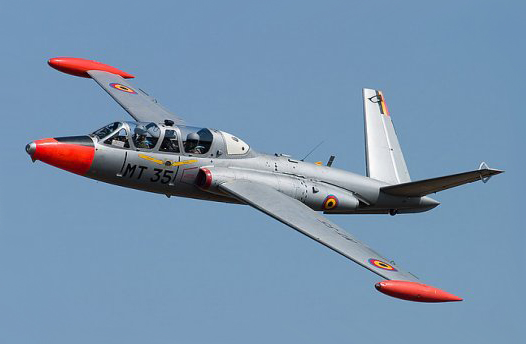
- A Magister of the Belgian Air Force

General information
- Type: Jet trainer
- National origin: France
- Manufacturer: Fouga, merged with Potez, merged with Sud-Aviation, merged with Aérospatiale
- Status: Retired; continues as civilian-owned warbirds
- Primary users: French Air Force Israeli Air Force; German Air Force; Finnish Air Force
- Number built: 868 total Air Fouga: 576; Heinkel-Messerschmitt: 194; IAI: 36; Valmet: 62

History
- Introduction date: 1956
- First flight: 23 July 1952
- Variant: Fouga CM.175 Zéphyr

The Fouga CM.170 Magister is a 1950s French two-seat jet trainer aircraft that was developed and manufactured by French aircraft manufacturer Établissements Fouga & Cie. Easily recognizable by its V-tail, almost 1,000 have been built in France and under license in West Germany, Israel, and Finland.

In 1948, development commenced at Fouga on a new primary trainer aircraft design that harnessed newly developed jet propulsion technology. The initial design was evaluated by the French Air Force (Armée de l'Air, AdA) and, in response to its determination that the aircraft lacked sufficient power for its requirements, was enlarged and adopted a pair of Turbomeca Marboré turbojet engines. First flying on 23 July 1952, the first production order for the type was received on 13 January 1954. In addition, the related CM.175 Zéphyr was a carrier-capable version developed and produced for the French Navy.

While primarily operated as a trainer aircraft, the Magister was also frequently used in combat as a close air support platform by various operators. In the latter capacity, it saw action during the Six-Day War, the Salvadoran Civil War, the Western Sahara War, and the Congo Crisis. The Magister was also chosen by many aerobatics display teams, including the Patrouille de France (from 1964 to 1980). In French service, the Magister was eventually replaced by the Dassault/Dornier Alpha Jet. After its retirement by the French Air Force, Magisters were purchased by several private-owner pilots in the US and have since been operated in the experimental category.

== Development ==
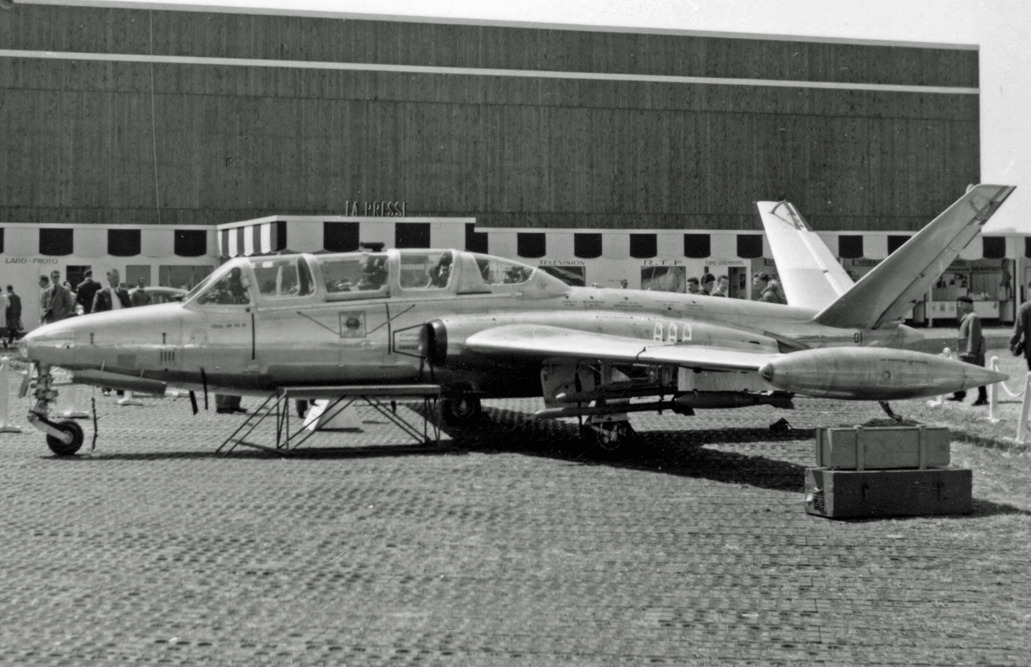
The first CM.170M development aircraft for the Aéronavale at the Paris Air Show in May 1957

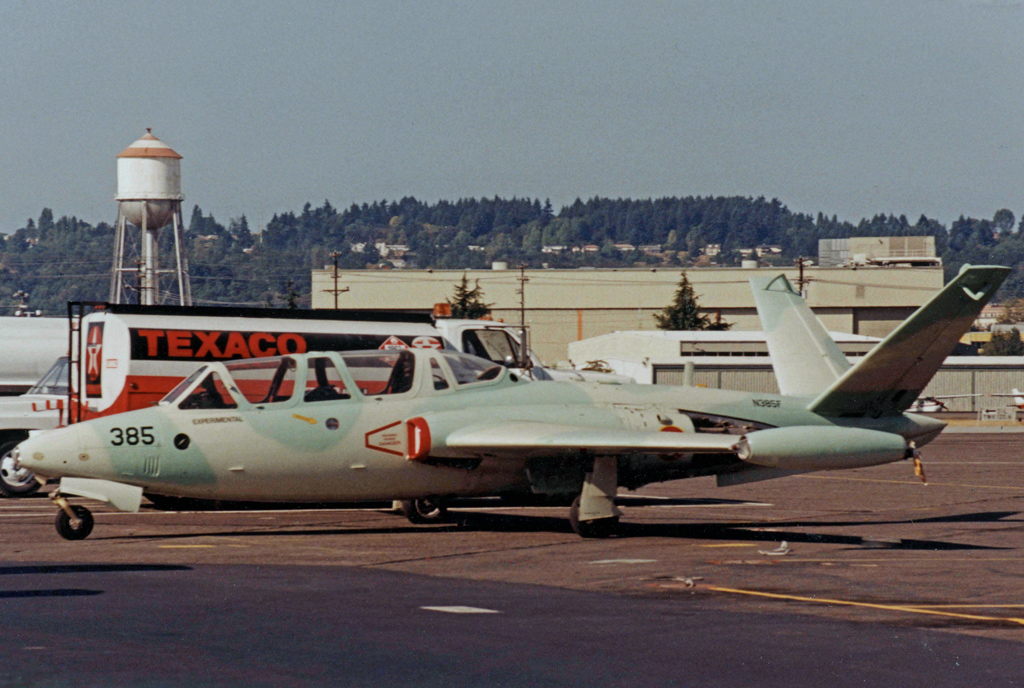
Ex-French Air Force CM170R privately operated from Boeing Field, Seattle in 1998

During 1948, aircraft designers Pierre Mauboussin, Robert Castello, and Jacques Henrat at French aircraft manufacturer Fouga embarked upon the design of a new jet-propelled primary trainer aircraft, initially designated as the CM.130, intended for the French Air Force (Armée de l'Air, AdA) as a replacement for piston-engined Morane-Saulnier MS.475 aircraft. The AdA reviewed the project and found that the aircraft lacked power from the two Turbomeca Palas turbojet engines selected for the aircraft; in response, Fouga proceeded to enlarge the basic design, which was equipped with the more powerful Turbomeca Marboré engine and retaining the distinctive butterfly tail of the Fouga CM.8 glider, which had been used by Fouga for jet engine research.

During December 1950, the AdA placed an order for three prototypes; on 23 July 1952, the first aircraft conducted its maiden flight. During June 1953, a pre-production batch of 10 aircraft were ordered, which was followed by an initial production order for 95 aircraft on 13 January 1954. By October 1955, all 13 pre-production Magisters had been completed, while the first flight of the first production aircraft was imminent. Also scheduled to fly early in 1956 was the CM.171, which functioned as a test aircraft for the envisioned CM.195 swept-wing, butterfly-tailed trainer.

The production of the Magister parts were split between Morane-Saulnier (Ossun), Fouga (Aire-sur-l'Adour) and Latécoère (Toulouse) with a final assembly by Fouga in a newly built plant at Toulouse-Blagnac (in 1954 and 1956) within a newly built complex. According to aviation publication Flight International, any export orders that were received were typically given priority over the existing orders which had been issued by the French government; this policy allowed for overseas countries to procure aircraft directly "off the line" with minimal delay between receipt of orders and the corresponding deliveries.

The Aéronavale (French naval air arm) decided to adopt a carrier-capable derivative of the Magister, the CM.175 Zéphyr, which served as a basic trainer for deck-landing training and carrier operations. These were preceded by two "proof of concept" prototypes, designated the CM.170M Magister, which performed their first flights in 1956 and 1957 respectively.

By 1960, in excess of 350 Magisters had entered in service with various operators; according to Flight International, production within France had attained a completion rate of five aircraft per month, while the projected total of French-built Magisters was reportedly expected to eventually top 600 units. The type was also being produced overseas under licensed production arrangements in West Germany, Finland and Israel. The first export customer for the Magister was West Germany, who placed an initial order for 62 aircraft directly from Fouga; a further 188 aircraft were produced by Flugzeug Union Süd (a consortium of Heinkel and Messerschmitt) under license. In addition, the Magister was also constructed under license by Finnish company Valmet and by Israeli firm Israel Aircraft Industries (IAI). As a result of these arrangements, a combined total of 286 aircraft were completed under license.

From 1960, an improved version of the Magister, designated the CM.170-2 Magister, was produced, which was powered by a more powerful Turbomeca Marboré IV engine. During 1962, production of the Magister was terminated in France but continued to be constructed under licence in Finland up to 1967. The development of the aircraft had been brought to an end in response to the AdA selecting the rival Alpha Jet as its new jet trainer instead.

== Design ==
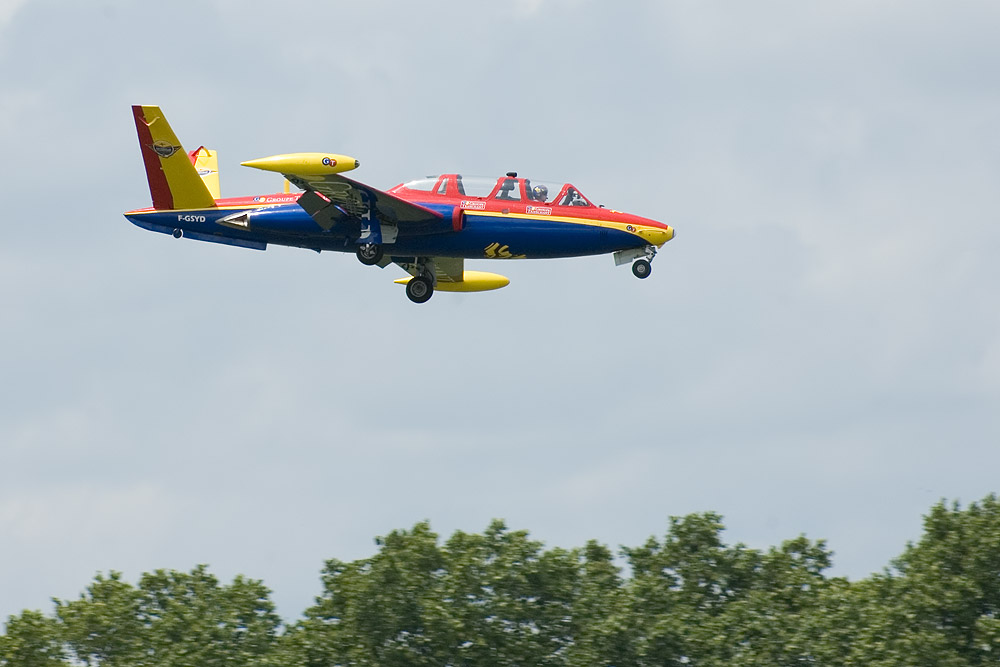
Fouga CM-170 Magister at Paris Air Show 2007

The Fouga CM.170 Magister was developed to perform both basic and intermediate training activities. It is a compact, tandem seat aircraft with performance akin to larger, more powerful aircraft. Comparatively, it was a higher performance aircraft than the rival British-built BAC Jet Provost, and was considered by the Aviation magazine Flight International to be comparable to Fokker S.14 Machtrainer. It featured a distinctive butterfly tail configuration; a conventional tail was tried but found to be aerodynamically inferior at higher speeds. A keel fitted under the rear fuselage functions to reduce the negative dihedral effect of the butterfly tail during rudder applications.

The Magister was powered by a pair of Turbomeca Marboré turbojet engines, which provided 3,900 N (880 lbf) of thrust each; it was promoted as offering "twin-engine safety with single-engined flying characteristics". The two engines, which were placed close to the centre line, produced very little asymmetric thrust as a consequence; this was viewed as a valuable safety feature for a trainer aircraft. While viewed as an uncommon instance, in the event of a single-engine flameout the relighting procedure was relatively quick and easy to perform. The rate of acceleration and rate of climb were less than contemporary frontline jet fighters, such as the de Havilland Vampire and Gloster Meteor, but was in excess of many of the previous generation of piston-engined trainer aircraft. The engines shared a common fuel system, but had independent oil systems; for extended range, tip tanks were provided as standard equipment.

The design of the Magister paid close attention to simplicity of operation; as such, a minimum number of procedures were necessary prior to take-off. Accessibility to both the engines and onboard equipment for servicing was above average; it was possible for both of the type's Marboré engines to be swapped out within 45 minutes. Provision was made for the installation of a pair of 7.5 mm guns on the aircraft's nose, which included a 200-round ammunition box for each gun and the ability to collect both links and cases. Underwing hard points could be used to hold up to four rockets or a pair of 50 kg (110 lb) bombs. A landing light was installed in the tip of the nose while a retractable taxiing light was installed upon the Messier-built nosewheel. The landing gear was satisfactory for operations from austere grass airstrips.

The Magister was typically outfitted with avionics such as very high frequency (VHF) radio systems, Lear radio compass, and intercom; all cockpit electronics conformed to NATO accessibility standards. It was not provided with ejector seats as standard, but the fitting of various units was considered to be available upon request. The assorted levers, switches and dials that comprised the cockpit displays were typically easily observable, while ample room was provided for pilot comfort and space to accommodate a parachute. The standard instrument panel is ahead of each pilot, and engine instruments are set to the left, while underneath are the flap indicator, flap switch and emergency selectors, along with the two throttles and fuel cocks; the right forward bench carries the radio panel, and to the extreme right of that are the armament controls. The cockpit was pressurized as well as being provisioned with a fresh air system.

The pedals were adjustable and had fairly permissible limits, while the cockpit itself was relatively easy to access, the canopy opening upwards and rearwards while using only a single step due to its low height. In order to account for the poor forward visibility available to the rear seat, usually occupied by the instructor, the front screen was bulged and a binocular periscope was fitted, providing a relatively clear perspective over a relatively wide angle over the top of the front cockpit. The forward cockpit, normally used by the student, provided excellent external visibility. According to Flight International, the Magister was able to perform various aerobatic manoeuvers "effortlessly", the flight controls were light and relatively well harmonized, and the stick has a firm sense of feel. It had a high level of lateral stability in flight, as well as being fairly directionally stable as well, allowing the aircraft to, when properly trimmed, be flown hands-off for indefinite periods.

== Operational history ==
=== Israel ===
Three Israeli Magisters in 1979

The first Fouga arrived in Israel in 1957 and shortly afterward local license-manufacturing was started by IAI, whose locally made version was named the IAI Tzukit. The first Tzukit was completed in 1959 and entered service in 1960.

The Fougas served with the IAF's flight school, where they were used for both basic and advanced jet training. The aircraft also formed the IAF Aerobatic Team. In 1974, the Magisters were replaced by A-4 Skyhawks in the advanced jet training role, keeping their basic training role alone. By the beginning of the 1980s, a plan was devised to upgrade and refurbish the aircraft, extending their service life. The refurbished aircraft featured over 250 modifications, including new engines and a newly designed cockpit. By 1986, the majority of the Fougas had been upgraded to Tzukit standard. They were replaced by the Beechcraft T-6 Texan II.

In 1964, the flight school organized a fighting squadron, staffed by school instructors and IAF reservists, to use the Magister as light attack aircraft in case of hostilities. In the 1967 Six-Day War, 44 Fougas were used by 147 Squadron as a close support aircraft, attacking targets on the Sinai front during the first day of the war, when Israel's more capable combat aircraft were deployed on Operation Focus against Arab air bases. They were then deployed against Jordanian forces, including armour, on the West Bank. Fougas reportedly destroyed over 50 tanks and over 70 other armoured vehicles, helping in holding back Jordanian armour which had been advancing towards Jerusalem. The Magister proved effective in the close support mission but sustained heavy casualties: seven aircraft and six pilots were recorded as lost.

=== El Salvador ===
Nine former Israeli and three French Magisters were acquired by the Salvadoran Air Force and used as both trainers and ground attack aircraft in the Salvadoran Civil War using bombs and nose-mounted 7.62 mm machine guns. They cooperated with Ouragans and A-37Bs. None is recorded as being lost to enemy fire, but only five were in operational condition by the end of the war.

=== Finland ===
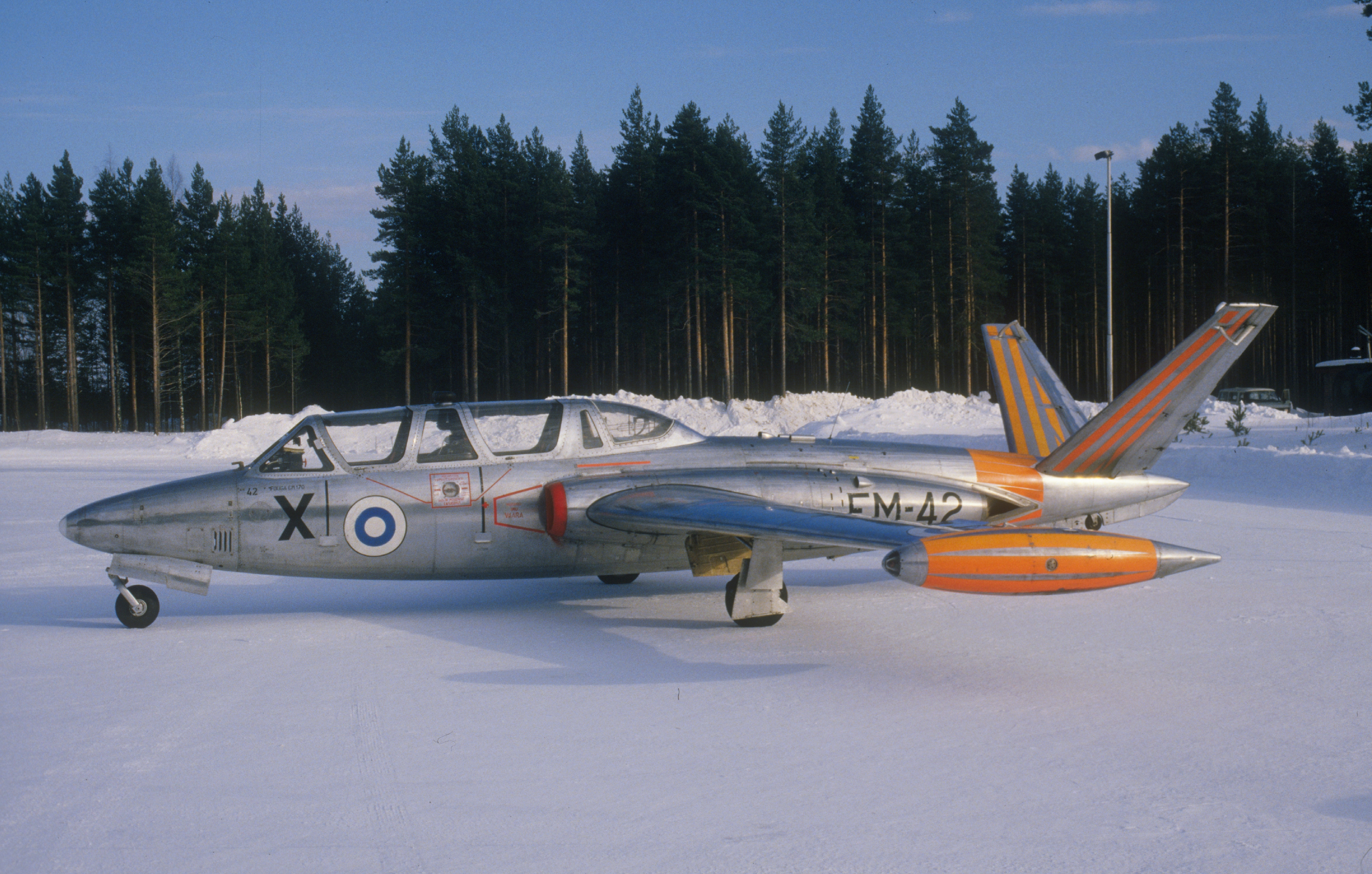
A Finnish Air Force Fouga CM-170 Magister in March, 1987.

In 1958–1959, Finland purchased 18 Magisters from France. At the same time it also obtained a manufacturing license. The Finnish aircraft manufacturer Valmet later built 62 Magisters between 1958 and 1967. Finland assigned a secondary attack role in the event of war, as the number of attack planes was limited by peace agreement with the Soviet Union.

The French built aircraft carried the designations FM-1...-18 and the Finnish built FM-21...-82. The aircraft served as a jet trainer in the Finnish Air Force between 1958 and 1988 until superseded by BAe Hawks. A total of 21 Magisters were destroyed in accidents, six with fatal outcome. The usual Finnish Air Force nickname for the aircraft was Kukkopilli (Ocarina) because of the unique sound of the Turbomeca Marboré turbojet.

Two airworthy Magisters, FM-51 (OH-FMM) and FM-37 (OH-FMA) are flown as warbirds by private owners.

=== Belgium ===
The Belgian Air Force operated 50 Magisters as primary trainers. The aerobatic team The Red Devils also used them as display aircraft. A small number of Magisters remained in use until September 2007, as flight maintenance aircraft for senior officers. The Belgian Air Force was the last country that used Magisters for full duty.

=== Brazil ===
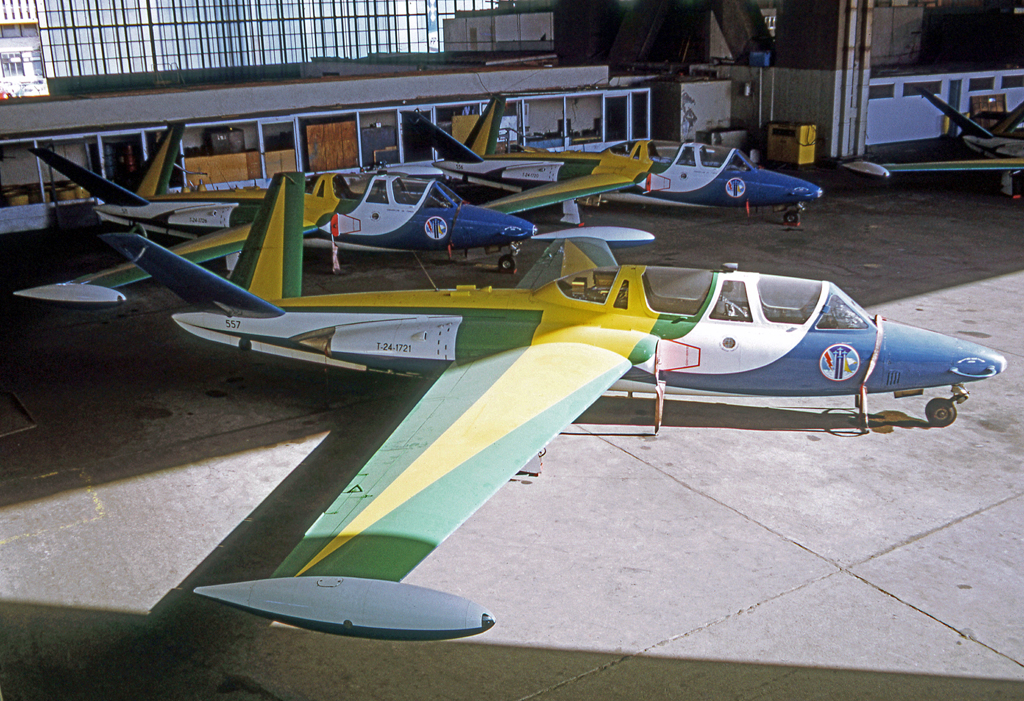
Four Magisters of the FAB's Esquadrilha da Fumaça at Santos Dumont Airport, Rio de Janeiro in 1972.

The Força Aérea Brasileira (FAB) used the Magister in their aerobatic display team, the Esquadrilha da Fumaça, from 1968 until 1975. Its aircraft were numbered T-24 in the trainer series of FAB type designations.

=== Katanga ===
During the Congo Crisis, the pro-secessionist Katangese Air Force purchased nine newly built Magisters, set aside from a Belgian order. Only three were delivered to Katanga, in February 1961. One of these was used against United Nations peacekeepers in the September 1961 Siege of Jadotville, flown by a Belgian pilot and armed with two machine guns and two locally made light bombs. It destroyed two DC-4s and a DC-3 on the ground and made numerous attacks on ground targets. It is alleged that a Magister may have been involved in the crash of a DC-6 that was carrying Dag Hammarskjöld, the UN Secretary General and 15 others to Ndola Airport in Zambia.

The aircraft was not used again after 1961.

=== Morocco ===
The Moroccan Air Force purchased 25 Magisters from France between 1956 and 1970 for training, some of which were employed in the Western Sahara War against Polisario forces. The loss of several in action led to the Magister's retirement from combat duties in the 1980s replaced by Alpha Jets.

=== Ireland ===
The Irish Air Corps operated six Magisters from 1975 to 1999. They were bought to replace the six aging De Havilland Vampire T.55s of No.1 Fighter Squadron. Four of the Magisters were secondhand from the Austrian Air Force and the two remaining aircraft were originally intended for the Katangese Air Force, but were seized while being shipped during the Congo Crisis and never made it to Katanga. All aircraft were refurbished to "as-new" condition before entering Air Corps service. The six aircraft were primarily used for Light Strike and made up the Light Strike Squadron, but would also be used in the advanced training role. Four of the Magisters equipped the Air Corps display team, the Silver Swallows.

=== Cambodia ===
Cambodia's Royal Cambodian Air Force operated four Magisters from 1961. They were used initially only for training purposes, but were later also used as light strike aircraft. Allegedly, Cambodian Magisters were very active in the Khmer Air Force from 1970. The Magisters were combined with four Cessna AT-37Bs of the Air Academy forming a Light Attack Squadron. This unit was active at the time, frequently cooperating also with the three or four A-1Ds that were still operational.

=== Libya ===
Libya initially acquired at least 12 Magister Jets for the Libyan Air Force as part of a larger Franco-Libyan arms deal in December 1969 (which included 10 Alouette IIIs, 9 SA.321M Super Frelon helicopters and 110 Mirage 5s).

== Variants ==
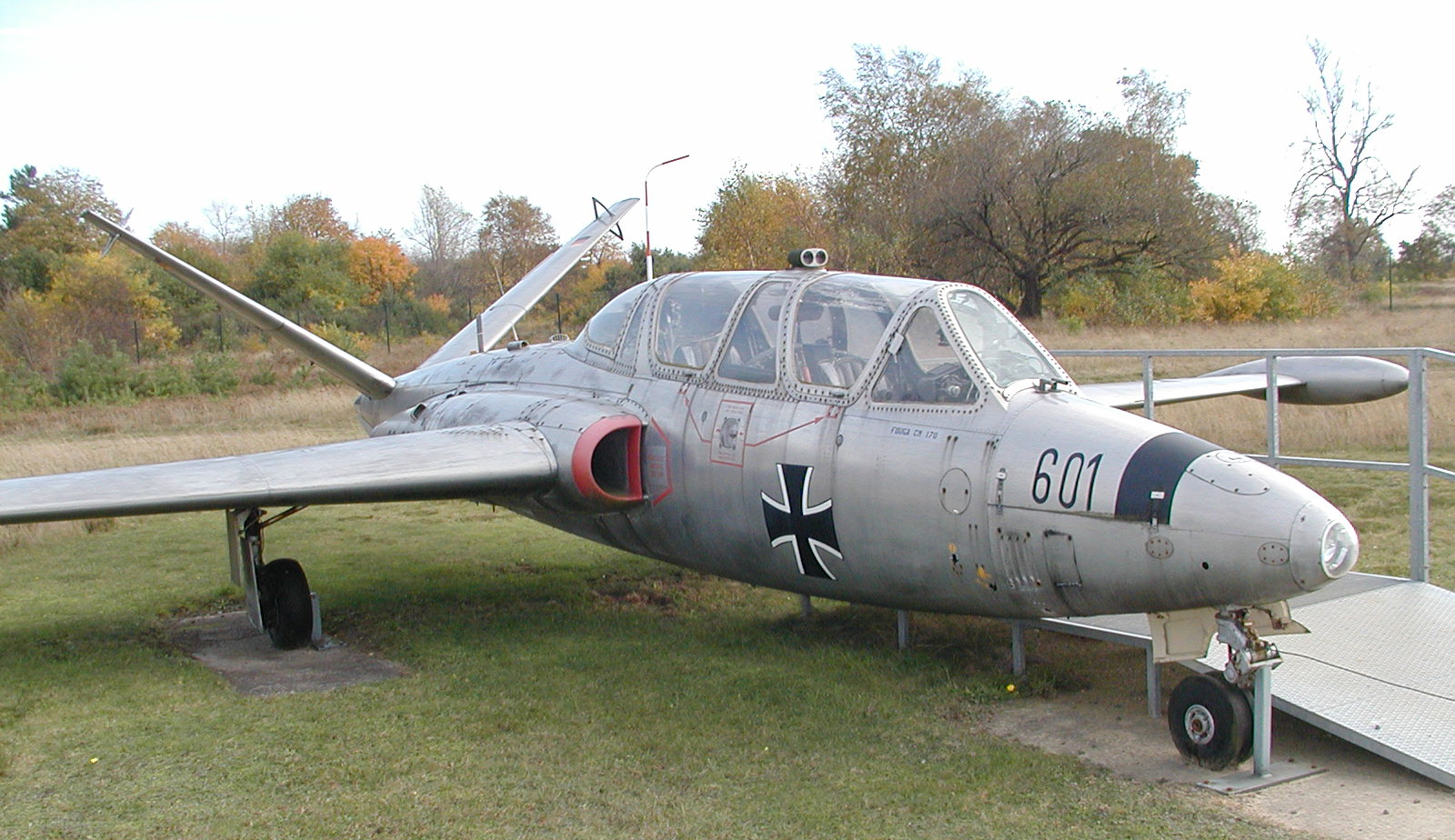
Fouga Magister of the German Air Force

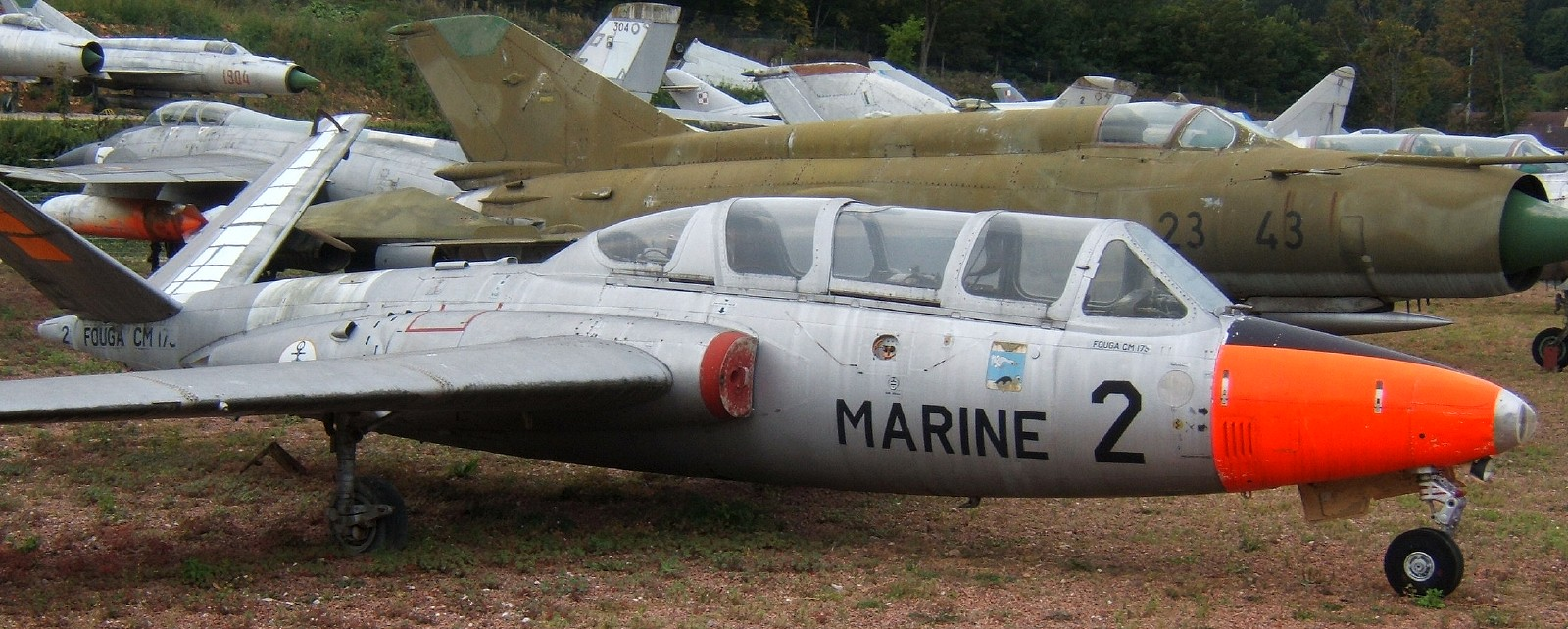
Fouga CM.175 Zéphyr

CM.160
A proposed lightweight version of the CM.170R for operation from grass or makeshift runways.
CM.170 Magister
three prototypes and 10 pre-production aircraft.
CM.170M Magister
two prototypes for the French Aéronavale
CM.170R
Initial production version of the Magister.
CM.170-1 Magister
first production version with Turbomeca Marboré II engines; 761 were built including 188 in West Germany, 62 in Finland and 50 in Israel.
CM.170-2 Magister
uprated Marboré VI engines with 4.7 kN (1,055 lbf) thrust each; 137 built.
CM.171 Makalu
enlarged airframe, Turbomeca Gabizo engines with 10.8 kN (2,422 lbf) thrust each, the only prototype lost in an accident on 20 March 1957
CM.173 Super Magister/ Potez 94
Marboré Super VI engines with 5.1 kN (1,143 lbf) thrust each and ejection seats; one prototype built.
CM.175 Zéphyr
A shipboard trainer for the Aéronavale, with strengthened undercarriage, catapult attachments and arrestor hook; 30 built.
Potez CM.191
4-seat version of the Magister; two prototypes built.
IAI Tzukit
or AMIT Fouga – Israeli Air Force version, updated with new cockpit, composite materials
Fouga 90/90A
Development based on the CM.170 with Turbomeca Astafan engines with 7.6 kN (1,715 lbf) thrust each, reshaped canopy for better visibility, and upgraded avionics. One prototype built. Proposed version 90A was equipped with a 790 kp Turbomeca Astafan engine; both versions failed to attract orders.
T-24
Brazilian Air Force designation of the CM.170-2.

== Operators ==
Algeria

- Algerian Air Force

Austria

- Austrian Air Force

Bangladesh

- Bangladeshi Air Force

Belgium

- Belgian Air Component

Brazil

- Brazilian Air Force

Cambodia

- Royal Khmer Aviation (AVRK)

Cameroon

- Cameroon Air Force

El Salvador

- Salvadoran Air Force

Finland

- Finnish Air Force

France

- French Air Force
- French Navy

Gabon

- Presidential Guard

Germany

- German Air Force

Guatemala

- Guatemalan Air Force

Ireland

- Irish Air Corps

Israel

- Israeli Air Force

Katanga

- Katangese Air Force

Lebanon

- Lebanese Air Force

Libya

- Libyan Arab Air Force

Morocco

- Royal Moroccan Air Force

Rwanda

- Rwandan Air Force

Senegal

- Senegalese Air Force

Uganda

- Ugandan Air Force

== Specifications (CM.170-1) ==
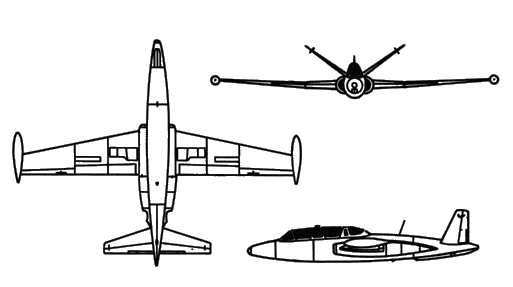
Fouga Magister 3-view drawing

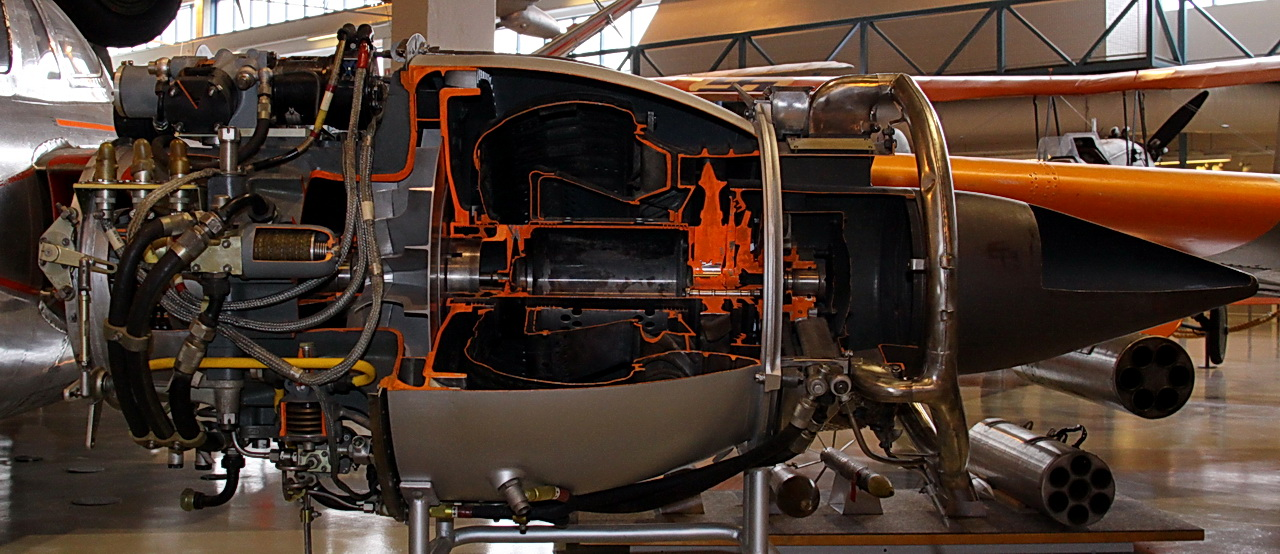
Turbomeca Marboré II F 3

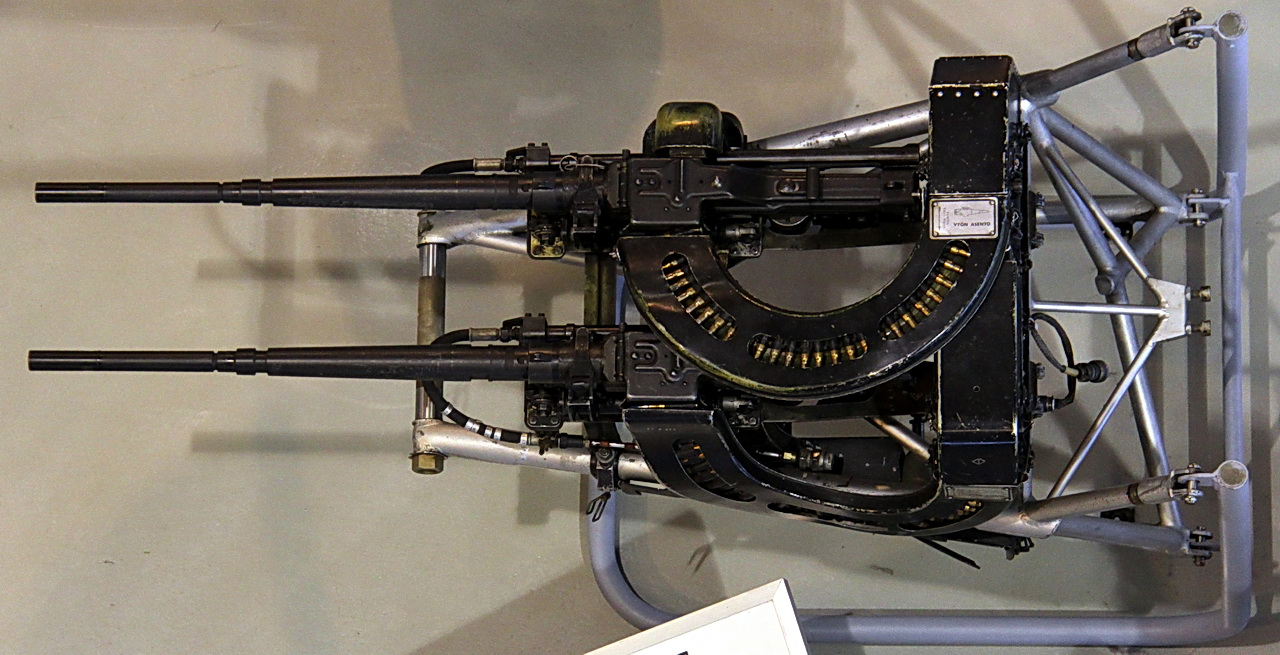

Data from Jane's All The World's Aircraft 1965–66

General characteristics

- Crew: 2
- Length: 10.06 m (33 ft 0 in)
- Wingspan: 12.15 m (39 ft 10 in) (over tip tanks)
- Height: 2.80 m (9 ft 2 in)
- Wing area: 17.30 m^{2} (186.2 sq ft)
- Aspect ratio: 7.42:1
- Airfoil: NACA 64 Series
- Empty weight: 2,150 kg (4,740 lb)
- Gross weight: 2,850 kg (6,283 lb) (without tip tanks)
- Max takeoff weight: 3,200 kg (7,055 lb)
- Fuel capacity: 730 L (190 US gal; 160 imp gal) internal fuel; 980 L (260 US gal; 220 imp gal) with tip tanks
- Powerplant: 2 × Turbomeca Marboré IIA turbojets, 3.9 kN (880 lbf) thrust each

Performance

- Maximum speed: 715 km/h (444 mph, 386 kn) at 30,000 ft (9,100 m)
- Never exceed speed: 860 km/h (530 mph, 460 kn) (Mach 0.82)
- Range: 1,200 km (750 mi, 650 nmi) (with external tanks)
- Endurance: 2 hr 40 min (with external tanks)
- Service ceiling: 11,000 m (36,000 ft)
- Rate of climb: 16.99 m/s (3,345 ft/min) (without tip tanks)
- Takeoff distance to 15 m (50 ft): 930 m (3,050 ft)

Armament

- 2× 7.5 mm or 7.62 mm machine guns, 200 rounds/gun
- Up to 140 kg (310 lb) of weapons on two underwing hardpoints, including 50 kg (110 lb) bombs, unguided rockets (T 10, T 900 or SNEB rockets pod), and Nord Aviation SS.11 anti-tank missiles.

== See also ==
- List of military aircraft of France

Related development

- Fouga CM.175 Zéphyr

Aircraft of comparable role, configuration, and era

- Aero L-29 Delfín
- BAC Jet Provost
- Cessna T-37 Tweet
- Fiat G.80
- Fokker S.14 Machtrainer
- Fuji T-1
