= Turbomeca Marboré =

Turbojet engine family by Turbomeca

Marboré
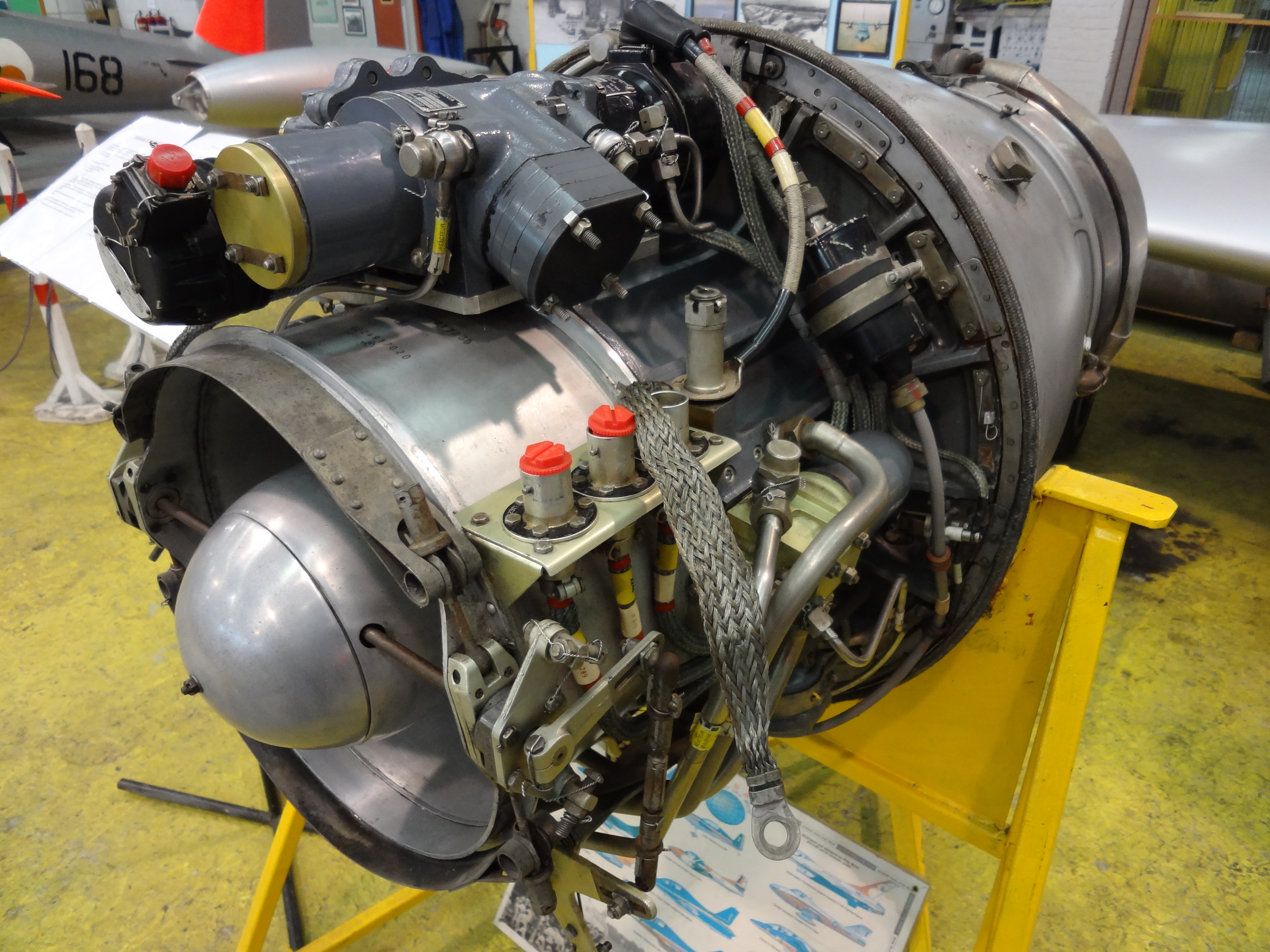
- Marboré on display at the Air Corps Museum, Baldonnel, County Dublin
- Type: Turbojet
- National origin: France
- Manufacturer: Turbomeca
- First run: 16 June 1951 (first flight)
- Major applications: Fouga Magister; Fouga Zéphyr
- Variants: Teledyne CAE J69

The Turbomeca Marboré is a small turbojet engine that was produced by Turbomeca from the 1950s into the 1970s. The most popular uses of this engine were in the Fouga CM.170 Magister and the Morane-Saulnier MS.760 Paris. It was also licensed for production in the United States as the Teledyne CAE J69. In Spain the Turbomeca model Marboré II was manufactured by ENMASA under license with the name Marboré M21.

The original Marboré, as well as Marboré III, IV, and V were not produced in significant numbers. A typical weight for this series of engines is 140 kg (310 lb). Fuel consumption is 720 L/h (160 imp gal/h; 190 gal/h) on the Marboré VI at 4,500 m (14,800 ft), as compared to 520 L/h (110 imp gal/h; 140 gal/h) on Marboré II engines (same altitude), as well as an increase of fuel consumption of 27% and a decrease in cruise range capabilities.

== Variants ==
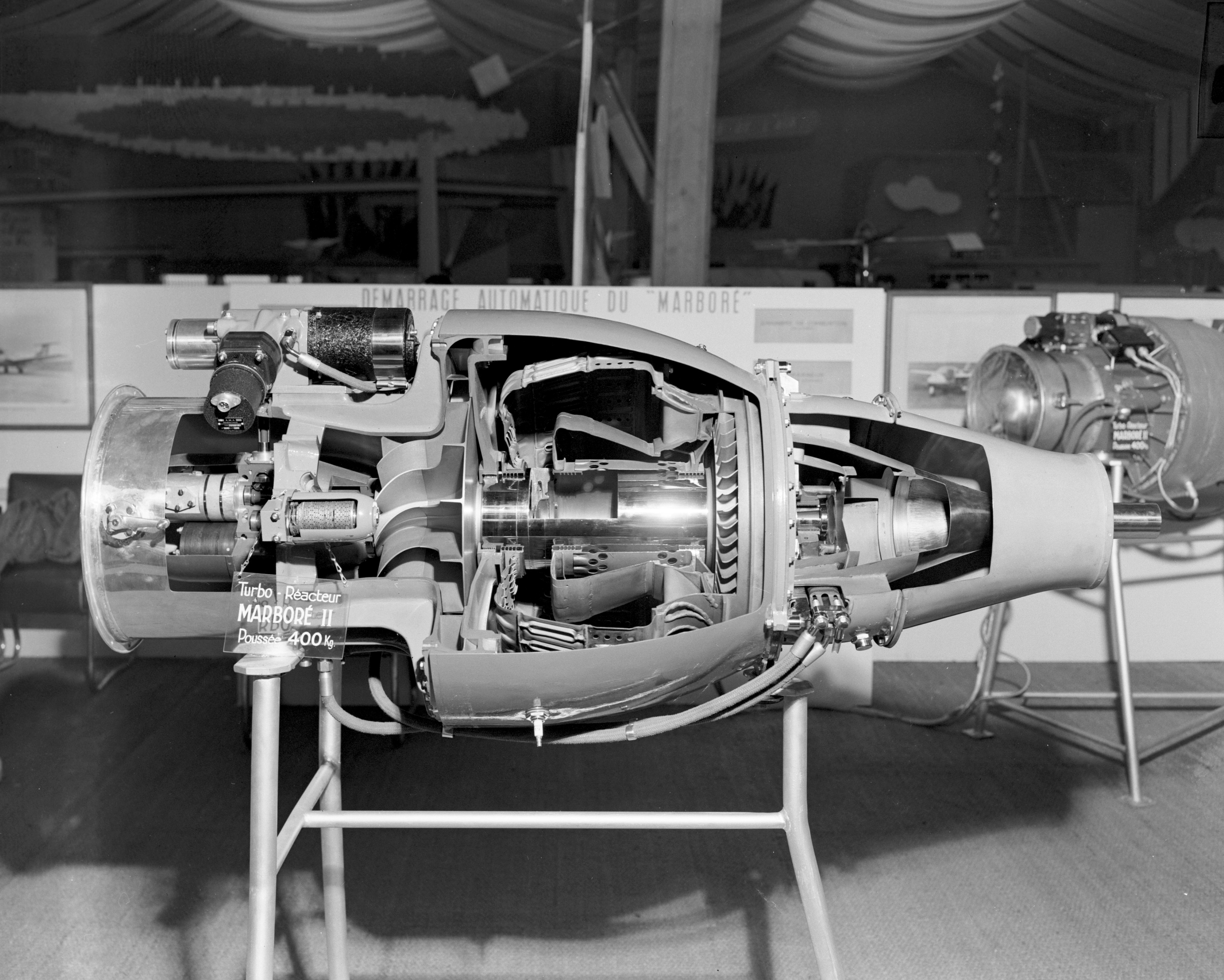
Marboré II displayed at 1953 Paris Air Show

Marboré I
Prototypes and test examples
Marboré II
The first major production version was the Marboré II, which had a maximum thrust of 3.9 kN (880 lb_{f}) at 22,500 rpm. In its most basic form, it is a single-spool, centrifugal compressor turbojet. Fuel consumption was rated at 410 L/h (90 imp gal/h; 110 gal/h). Variations include military or civilian aircraft, oil tank design, auxiliary equipment, and exhaust pipe configuration. Some variants also included one axial stage compressor for additional performance. The engine dimensions differ depending on the variant, auxiliary components and mounting configurations.
Marboré IIA
Marboré IIB
Marboré IIC
Marboré IIF
Marboré IIG
Marboré III
Marboré IV
Marboré V
Marboré VI
The Marboré VI series were slightly more powerful at 4.8 kN (1,100 lb_{f}) instead of 3.9 kN (880 lb_{f}). Fuel consumption was only slightly higher at 450 L/h (99 imp gal/h; 120 gal/h). This was a 23% increase in thrust with slightly more than a 9% increase in fuel consumption. As a result, the VI series were used to re-engine many II-series powered aircraft, and Marboré II engines became available at discount prices.
Teledyne CAE J69: Licence production and development in the United States.
Marboré VIC
Marboré VIF

== Applications ==
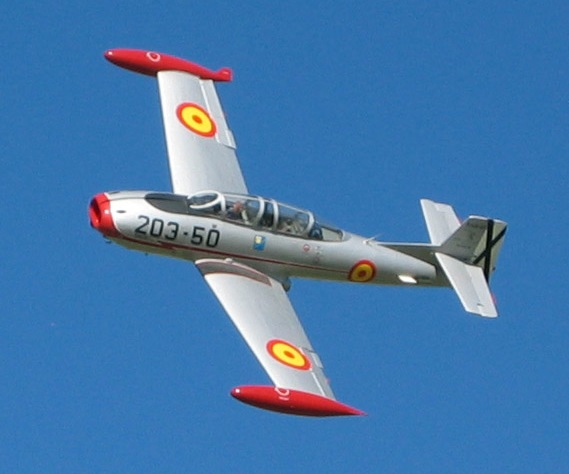
Two Marboré engines powered the Hispano HA-200

Marboré

- Ambrosini Sagittario
- Bölkow Bo 46
- Fouga CM.170 Magister
- Fouga CM.175 Zéphyr
- Hispano HA-200
- Miles Student
- Morane-Saulnier MS.755 Fleuret
- Morane-Saulnier MS.760 Paris
- Nord Aviation CT20
- SNCASO Deltaviex
- SNCASO Trident
- Stargate YT-33

J69
See Teledyne CAE J69

== Specifications (Marboré II) ==
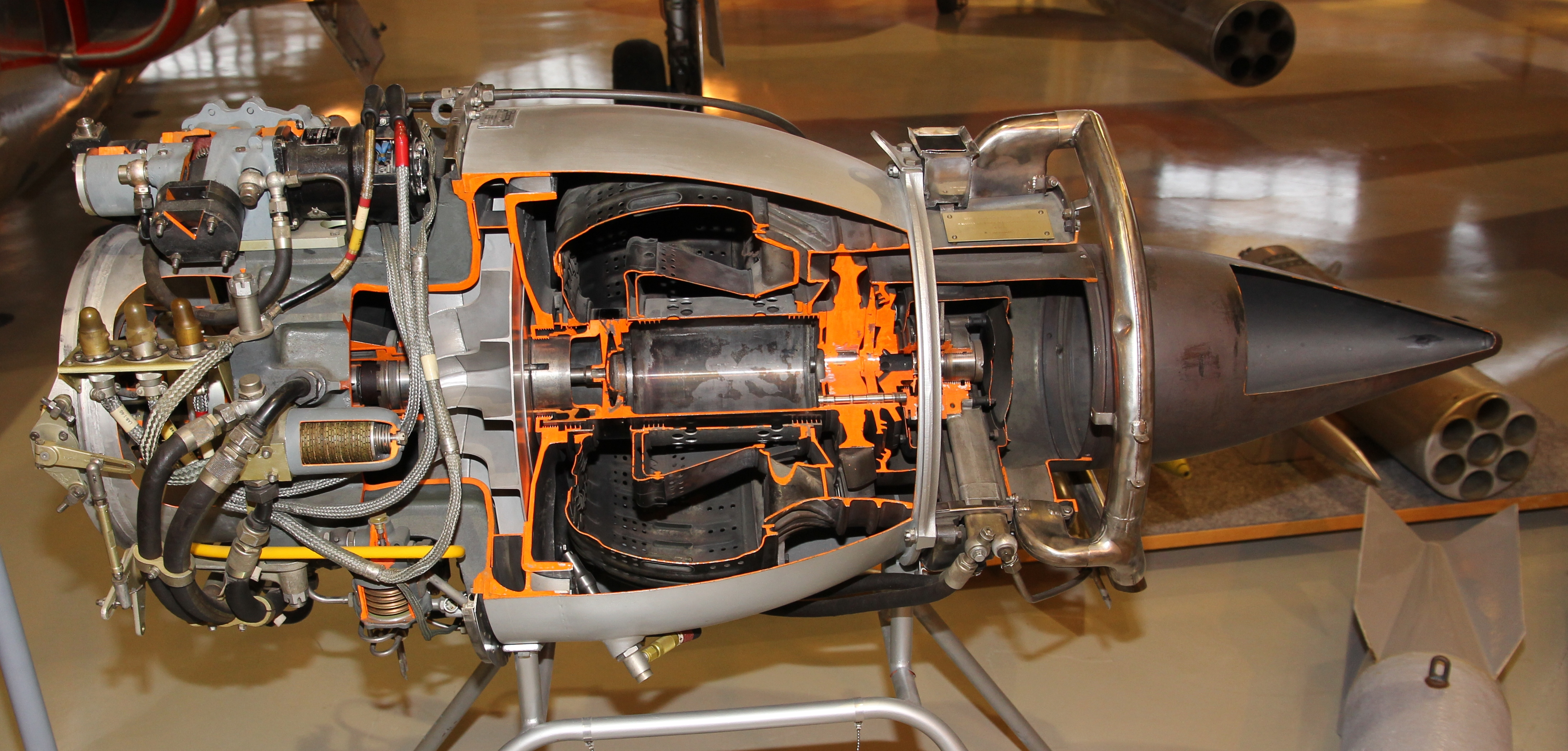
Sectioned Marboré II on display at the Finnish Airforce Museum

Data from FAA TCDS, Aircraft engines of the World 1953

==== General characteristics ====
- Type: Turbojet
- Length: 1,064 mm (41.9 in)
- Diameter: 567 mm (22.3 in)
- Dry weight: 133 kg (293 lb)

==== Components ====
- Compressor: Single-stage centrifugal
- Combustors: Annular combustion chamber
- Turbine: Single-stage axial flow
- Fuel type: Aviation kerosene Air 3405 (JP-1)
- Oil system: Dry sump, Turbomeca gear pump at 4.8 bar (70 psi)

==== Performance ====
- Maximum thrust:

Take-off: 3.9 kN (880 lbf) at 22,600 rpm / sea level
Max continuous: 3.14 kN (705 lbf) at 21,000 rpm / sea level

- Overall pressure ratio: 4:1
- Air mass flow: 7.6 kg (17 lb)
- Turbine inlet temperature:

Before turbine: 800 °C (1,470 °F; 1,070 K)
After turbine: 610 °C (1,130 °F; 883 K)

- Specific fuel consumption: 110 kg/kN/h (1.08 lb/lbf/h)
- Thrust-to-weight ratio: 3.03

== See also ==
Related development

- Teledyne CAE J69

Related lists

- List of aircraft engines
