= SNCASO SO.3050 =

SO.3050

General information
- Type: Two seat touring aircraft
- National origin: France
- Manufacturer: SNCASO
- Designer: Chavignon
- Number built: 1

History
- First flight: 15 March 1945

The SNCASO SO.3050 was a two seat light touring aircraft that was designed and built in France towards the end of World War II. Only one was completed and that was soon abandoned.

== Design and development ==
The SO.3050 was designed in occupied France during World War II and was the first French two seat tourer to fly after the Liberation. It was a conventional low wing cantilever monoplane of all metal construction. It was powered by a 104 kW (140 hp) Renault 4Pei air-cooled inverted four cylinder inline engine. Pilot and passenger sat side by side under multipart glazing which ran rearwards into the raised upper fuselage. This raised region dropped away towards the tail, where the tailplane was mounted on top of the fuselage. The vertical tail was straight edged but with a broad rounded top and a curved fillet to merge it into the fuselage. The tourer had a fixed tailwheel undercarriage with faired legs and spats; the tailwheel castored.

The first flight took place on 13 March 1945 from Bordeaux-Merignac, piloted by Fernand Lefebre. During flight testing, the aircraft demonstrated acceptable handling characteristics other than poor stall behavior when landing. Despite the stall problems, the aircraft was granted an airworthiness certificate. No production followed, but the prototype continued in use for several years, being used as a chase plane for early test flights of the SNCASO SO.8000 Narval fighter.

== Specifications ==
Data from Gaillard (1990) p.38, Jane's all the World's Aircraft 1947

General characteristics

- Crew: One pilot
- Capacity: One passenger
- Length: 7.08 m (23 ft 3 in)
- Wingspan: 9.2 m (30 ft 2 in)
- Height: 2.30 m (7 ft 7 in)
- Wing area: 10.5 m^{2} (113 sq ft)
- Empty weight: 556 kg (1,226 lb)
- Max takeoff weight: 835 kg (1,841 lb)
- Fuel capacity: 110 L (29 US gal; 24 imp gal) fuel; 10 L (2.6 US gal; 2.2 imp gal) oil
- Powerplant: 1 × Renault 4Pei air-cooled inverted 4 cylinder inline, 100 kW (140 hp)
- Propellers: 2-bladed Merville

Performance

- Maximum speed: 250 km/h (160 mph, 130 kn)
- Cruise speed: 220 km/h (140 mph, 120 kn)
- Range: 700 km (430 mi, 380 nmi)
- Service ceiling: 5,000 m (16,000 ft)
- Rate of climb: 4.5 m/s (890 ft/min)
- Time to altitude: 1,000 m (3,300 ft) in 4 minutes
- Power/mass: 8 kg/kW (13.2 lb/hp)
