= Ateliers Aéronautiques de Suresnes =

Ateliers Aéronautiques de Suresnes (AAS) was a French aircraft manufacturer that existed for a short while after World War II. Operating from the Farman Aviation Works factory near Paris, its most notable achievement was completing the two examples of the Heinkel He 274 left unfinished by the Germans.

Later in its history, AAS was combined with other French aeronautical firms into the government-sponsored SNCASO aerospace conglomerate.

== See also ==
- History of Suresnes
