= SNCASO SO.7010 Pégase =

French six-passenger light transport aircraft

Pégase

General information
- Type: Six seat passenger transport
- National origin: France
- Manufacturer: SNCASO
- Designer: Lucien Servanty
- Number built: 1

History
- Retired: after 15 Flights

The SNCASO SO.7010 Pégase was a six-passenger light transport aircraft developed in France immediately after World War II. It was powered by a pair of tandem-coupled V-8 engines but this power plant proved to be too troublesome for development to proceed.

== Design and development ==
The Pégase was a low wing cantilever monoplane, notable for its unusual engine and for its fuselage construction. Externally it appeared to be a conventional single engine aircraft with a three blade propeller but its Mathis G16 engine was the result of combining two 149 kW (200 hp) Mathis G8 V-8s onto a single crankcase. The two units were connected to the propeller shaft with a free-wheel coupling in the reduction gearing so that if one failed, the other could continue to run. Thus the Pégase had only single engine drag with the extra safety provided by two engines but none of the usual asymmetry issues associated with engine failure in a twin.

Contemporary reporters were impressed with the "unit cabin". In the cabin region, fuselage stresses were carried by a keel, allowing the cabin sides and roof to be light and unstressed whilst maintaining the fuselage contours and to be generously glazed. The Pégase had a slightly humped roofline, a conventional tail with a tall, straight tapered, round tipped fin and rudder and had a tricycle undercarriage.

The Pégase was on display at the Paris Salon of November 1946, but it did not fly until 27 February 1948. Tests revealed problems with the new, underdeveloped engine and only fifteen flights were made before the Pégase programme was effectively abandoned, though from the April 1949 Salon Flight reported rather that development had been held up due to a shortage of engines.

== Specifications ==
Data from Les avions Francais de 1944 a 1964, S.N.C.A.S.O. SO-7010 'Pégase', Jane's all the World's Aircraft 1947

General characteristics

- Crew: Two
- Capacity: Six passengers
- Length: 11.12 m (36 ft 6 in)
- Wingspan: 14.75 m (48 ft 5 in)
- Height: 4.4 m (14 ft 5 in)
- Wing area: 33 m^{2} (360 sq ft)
- Empty weight: 2,048 kg (4,515 lb)
- Max takeoff weight: 3,050 kg (6,724 lb)
- Powerplant: 1 × Mathis G.16 coupled V-8 air-cooled piston engines (two coupled Mathis G.8R), 300 kW (400 hp)
- Propellers: 3-bladed variable pitch propeller, 2.56 m (8 ft 5 in) diameter

Performance

- Maximum speed: 300 km/h (190 mph, 160 kn)
- Cruise speed: 275 km/h (171 mph, 148 kn)
- Range: 1,250 km (780 mi, 670 nmi)
- Service ceiling: 5,000 m (16,000 ft)
- Wing loading: 88 kg/m^{2} (18 lb/sq ft)
- Power/mass: 9.655 kg/kW (15.87 lb/hp)

== Bibliography ==
- Chillon, Jacques; Dubois, Jean-Pierre & Wegg, John (1980). French Post-War Transport Aircraft. Tonbridge, UK: Air-Britain. ISBN 0-85130-078-2.
