= SNCASO SO.4000 =

1951 French experimental bomber aircraft

SO.4000

General information
- Type: Bomber
- National origin: France
- Manufacturer: SNCASO
- Status: Cancelled
- Number built: 1

History
- First flight: 15 March 1951
- Developed into: Sud Aviation Vautour

The SNCASO SO.4000 was an experimental French twin-engine bomber of the 1950s. It was the first French jet bomber developed, but it never entered operational service.

The SO.4000 was developed because the French Air Force needed a jet bomber, which produced a specification calling for one after the end of Second World War. The SNCASO's SO.4000 received a development contract to produce a pair of mockups and a full-scale prototype. The single full-scale aircraft, which performed its first and only test flight on 15 March 1951, would never enter mass production. Even prior to this flight, the design had been made obsolete by rapid advances in the field of aviation and was overweight and underpowered. Shortly after its only flight, during which it had been damaged during the landing, it was decided to abandon development. However, the SO.4000 would form the basis of the far more successful SO.4050 Vautour.

== Development ==
France's aviation industry was in dire straits, having been damaged more heavily than any other Allied nation as a consequence of the Second World War. Regardless, the French needed to revive the nation's aviation industry, and to use the latest advances for a new generation of competitive locally built aircraft. France, like other Allied nations in the war, benefitted from captured German research into high speed aircraft. These efforts were also aimed at reducing France's reliance on imported technology, and looked at jet propulsion and transonic aerodynamics.

Following the end of the war, the French Air Force produced a requirement for a jet bomber which was expected to have a takeoff weight of roughly 25–30 t (25,000–30,000 kg) and be capable of transonic speeds. The development of a jet-powered bomber aircraft was viewed as being a major technological challenge and this initiative would produce the first French jet bomber in the form of the SO.4000.

Submissions were tendered by several French aircraft manufacturers, including SNCASO with the SO 4000 and SNCAC's rival bid in the form of the SNCAC NC 270. Following a competitive review, SNCASO would receive a development order calling for a pair of manned scale models and a full-sized prototype. The first scale model, known as the SNCASO M.1, was an unpowered glider which would be tested from atop the Heinkel He 274 V1, (as the French AAS 01A), the first prototype of a late-war high-altitude strategic bomber, which had remained in France after the war. The He 274, having drawn the attention of French authorities, had been restored to flightworthy condition to allow such use. The second aircraft, the SNCASO M.2, was powered by a single British Rolls-Royce Derwent turbojet engine. SNCAC also received a contract to produce a prototype for their submission.

During 1947, as a result of the rapid advances made in aviation technologies made around this time, plans for a subsequent production run were abandoned. Nevertheless, it was decided to complete the two scale models and the full size prototype for experimental purposes. On 13 April 1949, the sole M.2 conducted its maiden flight, while the M.1 glider performed its first free-flight, launched from a SNCASE Languedoc, on 26 September 1949. Testing of the M.2 was considered to be successful, on one occasion having exceeded 1,000 km/h (621 mph) while flown in a dive, becoming the first French aircraft to achieve this feat. Both the M.1 and M.2 provided valuable data on features such as swept wings, pilot escape systems, spoiler control, and leading edge slats.

On 5 March 1950, the SO.4000 was rolled out; by this point, it was already obsolete and lacking in capabilities compared to its contemporaries. During the following month, the aircraft sustained damage when its undercarriage collapsed during taxiing tests. After completing repairs, the SO.4000 performed its maiden flight on 15 March 1951, piloted by chief test pilot Jaques Guignard. During landing, its undercarriage failed again, resulting in damage. The aircraft would never fly again and work on the project was abandoned without any further testing being carried out. According to Gunston and Gilchrist, the SO.4000 was a very heavy aircraft, which only compounded the weakness of possessing relatively little engine power, giving it an extremely poor thrust-to-weight ratio even when empty; they also criticised it as possessing "useless capabilities".

== Design ==
The SO.4000 was an unconventional experimental jet bomber. It featured a mid-mounted wing, which was swept at an angle of 35 degrees and mated with a carefully streamlined oval-section fuselage, which was furnished with a relatively tall tricycle undercarriage. This undercarriage, which was provisioned with tandem mainwheels, was somewhat unorthodox, as they retracted outwards into alcoves cut into perhaps the most stressed area of the airframe. The aircraft was powered by a pair of Rolls-Royce Nene turbojet engines, each capable of generating a maximum of 22.2 kN (4,980 lbf); Gunston and Gilchrist note the use of the Nene to be one of the few conventional choices adopted for the design. These engines were mounted in a side-by-side arrangement housed within the rear fuselage. Inlets for the engine were located on either side of the forward fuselage, while boundary layer air was directed via a splitter to slits above and below the lengthy inlet duct. The tailpipes were somewhat unusual, the nozzles being separated by the aircraft's fin.

The SO.4000 was operated by a crew of two, consisting of a pilot and test engineer/observer, both of which were seated in a pressurised cockpit located within the extreme nose of the aircraft and covered by a conventional canopy. All of the flight surfaces were manually actuated, although powered counterparts were envisioned for subsequent aircraft. A hydraulic system was used for some moving elements, such as the undercarriage and the flaps. Being intended for use as a bomber, the (unbuilt) production aircraft were envisioned to be capable of carrying a bombload of up to 5,000 kg (11,000 lb); furthermore, it was planned to install remotely-controlled barbettes that would have been armed with a pair of 20 mm cannon on the wingtips. The bomb bay would have been installed within the centre fuselage underneath the wing's central section. Despite its large size, the SO.4000's total fuel capacity was 1,430 gallons, which would have severely restricted its operational range if the type had ever entered service.

== Variants ==
SNCASO M1
A scale unpowered glider for research into the flying characteristics of the full size S.O.4000. Launched from a support frame above the fuselage of the sole Heinkel He 274, which had been abandoned in France and restored to airworthiness to support research programmes, and/or a similarly equipped SE-161 Languedoc.
SNCASO M2
Essentially similar to the M1 but powered by a single 15.57 kN (3,500 lbf) Rolls-Royce Derwent V centrifugal flow turbojet engine. First flown on 13 April 1949.
SNCASO S.O.4000
A single prototype of this jet powered bomber first flown on 15 March 1951. Powered by 2 × 22.15 kN (4,980 lbf) Rolls-Royce Nene 102 centrifugal flow turbojet engines.

== Specifications (Performance estimated) ==
Data from Plane Facts: An abortive bomber

General characteristics

- Crew: 2
- Length: 19.75 m (64 ft 10 in)
- Wingspan: 17.86 m (58 ft 7 in)
- Wing area: 75.00 m^{2} (807.3 sq ft)
- Empty weight: 16,583 kg (36,559 lb)
- Gross weight: 22,005 kg (48,513 lb)
- Powerplant: 2 × Rolls-Royce Nene 102 turbojet, 22.2 kN (4,980 lbf) thrust each

Performance

- Maximum speed: 850 km/h (530 mph, 460 kn) at 9,000 m (29,500 ft)
- Maximum speed: Mach 0.78

Armament

- Guns: 2x20mm wingtip-mounted machine guns (planned)
- Bombs: Up to 3,600 kg (1,800 kg internal, 1,800 kg external)
