= Sud-Ouest Triton =

French experimental aircraft

SO.6000 Triton
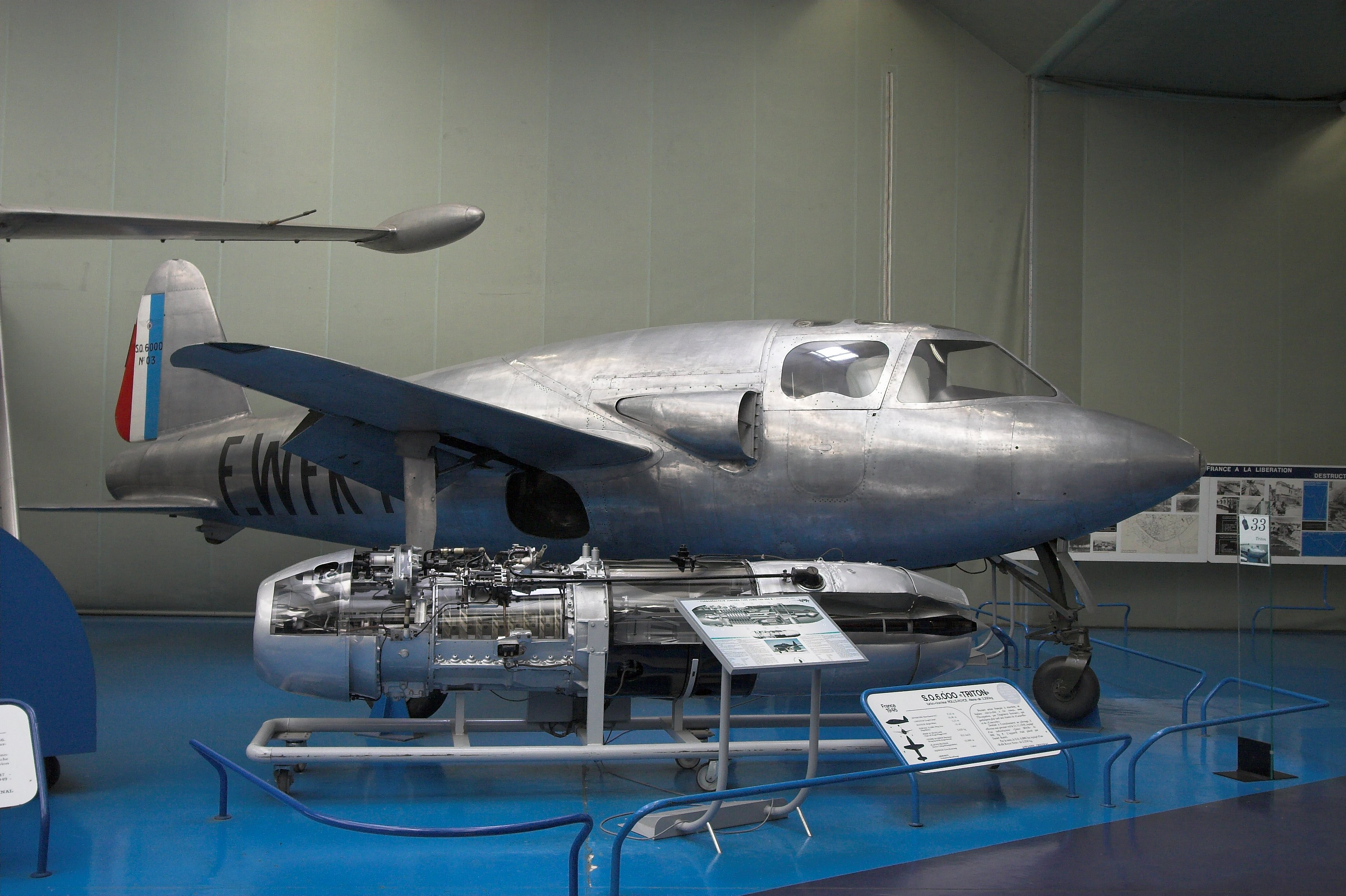
- SO.6000 Triton n°3 on display at the Musée de l'Air et de l'Espace in Le Bourget

General information
- Type: Experimental trainer aircraft
- National origin: France
- Manufacturer: SNCASO
- Number built: 5

History
- First flight: 11 November 1946

The Sud-Ouest SO.6000 Triton is an early experimental French jet aircraft. It has the distinction of being the first indigenously-designed jet-powered aircraft to be flown by the nation, having been designed and manufactured during the 1940s by the French aircraft construction consortium SNCASO.

Work on the French jet aircraft initiative had begun in secret during the Second World War, and harnessed research retrieved from Nazi Germany. Almost immediately after the end of the conflict, the French government issued a requirement for a batch of five prototype jet aircraft to be developed by French industry. To avoid delaying the overall project, it was decided to use the German-designed Junkers Jumo 004-B2 engine after severe development issues were encountered with the indigenously-developed Rateau-Anxionnaz GTS-65 turbojet engine. The British Rolls-Royce Nene turbojet engine was also adopted for some of the prototypes.

On 11 November 1946, the first prototype performed its maiden flight, flown by test pilot Daniel Rastel. This feat was viewed by the government as being an important, and public, advancement in the capabilities of French industry and military capability. A total of five aircraft were produced for the test programme, including one for static testing only. Despite multiple aircraft been built and successfully flown, further development of the SO.6000 was abandoned following the rapid emergence of more advanced jet-powered fighter aircraft.

== Design and development ==
=== Origins ===
According to aviation author Peter Caygill, France's aviation industry was in dire straits, perhaps having been more damaged than that of any other nation, as a consequence of events in the Second World War. Regardless, French industrialists and government officials alike were keen to make rapid advances in aviation technology to not only revive the nation's aviation capabilities, but to utilise the newest advances and produce a new generation of competitive indigenously-built aircraft. France, like the other Allied nations in the war, had benefitted from captured Germany high speed research; these factors combined gave a great impetus to undertaking advanced research projects.

Amongst the first new aviation projects to be launched in post-war France was the SO.6000. According to aviation author John W.R. Taylor, the origins of the SO.6000 can be found during 1943; allegedly, the aircraft is based upon a clandestine research effort conducted during the German occupation of France, headed by the French aeronautics engineer Lucien Servanty. Shortly after the end of the conflict, the new French government issued a requirement, calling for a total of five prototype aircraft to be constructed for testing purposes. The development of indigenously designed jet aircraft was seen as of national importance to the government, being intended to symbolise and embody the speedy recovery of France's industrial and military strength.

=== Design ===
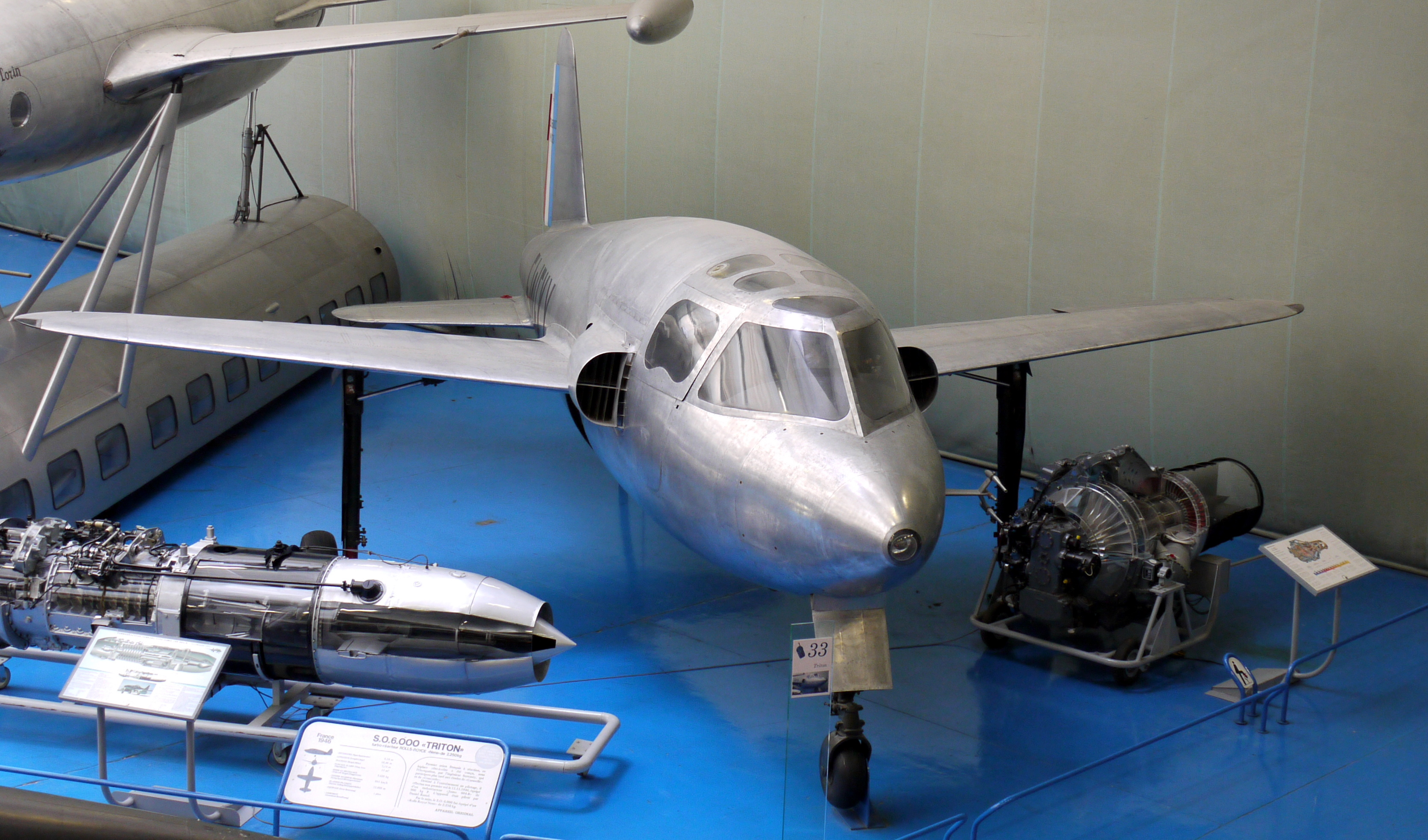
The SO.6000 Triton on static display at Le Bourget Airport, Paris

The SO.6000 was, despite the use of jet propulsion, an otherwise conventional aircraft. It was a compact and unarmed two-seater, having a deep-set fuselage and furnished with a mid-mounted straight wing. The spacious fuselage provided sufficient space for multiple engine models to be readily accommodated. Caygill observed that while SNCASO had to start from scratch on the fuselage's design, by pursuing a clean-sheet approach and the originality which that entailed, the SO.6000 lacked much of the conservatism present in the contemporary designs of several British aircraft manufacturers.

While having been envisioned from the onset to be powered by a jet engine, the availability of such a powerplant to install upon the aircraft was no straightforward issue. At one stage, it had been planned for the type to receive a French-designed Rateau-Anxionnaz GTS-65 turbojet engine. However, as a result of the delays encountered in the development of this engine, it was decided to instead adopt the German-designed Junkers Jumo 004-B2 engine for use upon the first prototype. The choice of a German engine was opted for as a means of preventing any unnecessary delay in the project.

== Operational history ==
On 11 November 1946, the first prototype performed its maiden flight, conducted by test pilot Daniel Rastel amid unfavourable weather conditions. The timing of the flight was deliberate, being only four days before the opening of an international aviation exhibition held at the Grand Palais; the French government were keen to demonstrate that they possessed technological parity with Germany, the United Kingdom, and the United States. According to Caygill, the Junkers engine was only capable of producing up to 1,980 lb of thrust and was quite underpowered for the SO.6000, being barely capable of achieving sustained flight and therefore lacked practicality. Accordingly, further prototypes were not powered by the Junkers engine.

The second prototype was used for static testing only, while the three other aircraft were powered by a license-built model of the British Rolls-Royce Nene turbojet engine, the last of these performing its first flight in November 1950. None of the aircraft would be powered by the intended GTS-65 engine, the development of which would eventually be terminated without any production examples being completed. When flown with the Nene engine, the SO.6000 was capable of achieving speeds of up to 593 mph, but was also beset by several vibration and stability issues when flown near these speeds.

The SO.6000's lead designer, Lucien Servanty, also worked on another aircraft during the late 1940s, the Sud-Ouest Espadon, which became France's first post-war jet fighter; he also participated in the design of numerous aircraft following this, including the Anglo-French supersonic airliner Concorde. Further development of the SO.6000 was ultimately abandoned during the early 1950s without any direct follow-on; as such, the SO.6000 was never use in any operational circumstance. The type had been rendered obsolete by the rapid pace of advancements, both in terms of jet propulsion specifically and wider aerospace capabilities generally, with numerous jet-powered designs being produced around this timeframe.

== Variants ==
- SO. 6000J Triton - Powered by a Junkers Jumo 109-004 engine, Two built, one for static testing.
- SO. 6000N Triton - Three aircraft powered by a Rolls-Royce Nene engine.

== Surviving aircraft ==
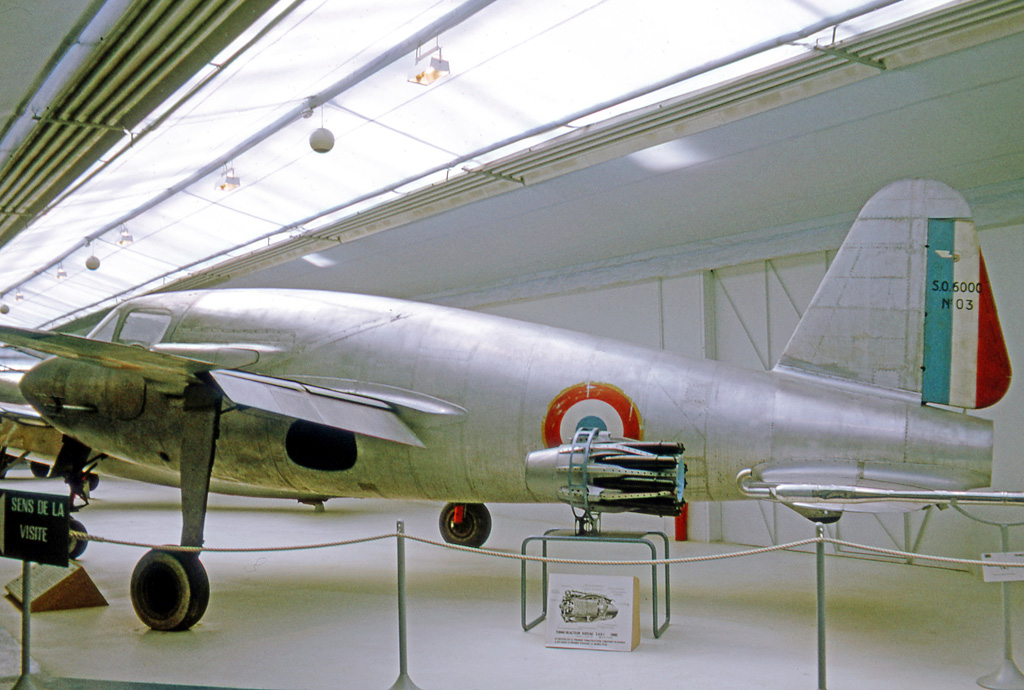
A rear view of the preserved SO.6000 Triton at Le Bourget Airport, Paris, in 1975

SO.6000N Triton No. 03 F-WFKY is exhibited in the Musee de l'Air et de l'Espace at Le Bourget Airport, to the north of Paris. This aircraft incorporates parts from No. 05 F-WFKX.

== Specifications (SO.6000-04) ==
Data from Jane's Pocket Book of Research and Experimental Aircraft

General characteristics

- Crew: 2
- Length: 10.41 m (34 ft 2 in)
- Wingspan: 9.96 m (32 ft 8 in)
- Wing area: 15 m^{2} (160 sq ft)
- Gross weight: 4,560 kg (10,053 lb)
- Powerplant: 1 × Hispano-Suiza Nene 101 centrifugal-flow turbojet, 21.6 kN (4,850 lbf) thrust

Performance

- Maximum speed: 955 km/h (593 mph, 516 kn)
- Service ceiling: 12,000 m (39,000 ft)
