= Sud-Ouest Corse =

French light twin piston-engine transport, 1947

Corse
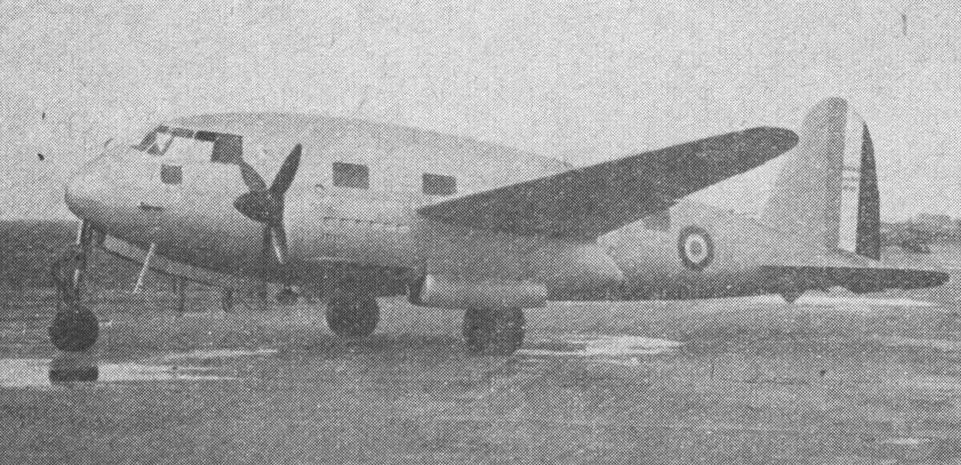
- SO 93

General information
- Type: Mail/passenger transport
- National origin: France
- Manufacturer: SNCASO
- Primary user: Aeronavale
- Number built: 64

History
- First flight: 17 July 1947

The Sud-Ouest Corse was a French mail and passenger transport aircraft, built by SNCASO.

== Development and design ==
The Corse began as the S.O.90 Cassiopée, a nine-passenger aircraft. The S.O.93 Corse and S.O.94 Corse II prototypes were developed as the S.O.95 Corse III. The aircraft was a cantilever mid-wing monoplane, powered by two Renault 12S engines with a retractable conventional landing gear. Seating up to 13 passengers, the seats could be quickly removed in order to carry more cargo. Intended to serve Air France, it failed their aircraft requirements. 60 aircraft were built for Aeronavale, and a small number for other overseas airlines.

== Variants ==
SNCASO SO.90 Cassiopée
Wartime prototype for 8 passengers and powered by 325 hp Bearn 6D-07 engines. First flew 16 August 1943 with 3 built.
S.O.93 Corse
Prototype powered by Renault 12S engines, 1 built.
S.O.94 Corse II
Production 10 passenger version, 15 built.
S.O.94R
Radar training conversion of S.O.94.
S.O.95M Corse III
Production 13 passenger version with tail-wheel undercarriage, all 45 built for military use.

== Operators ==
France

- French Air Force
- French Navy

India

- Air Services of India - ordered two aircraft in 1949. Withdrawn from service in October 1950.

== Specifications (S.O.95 Corse III) ==
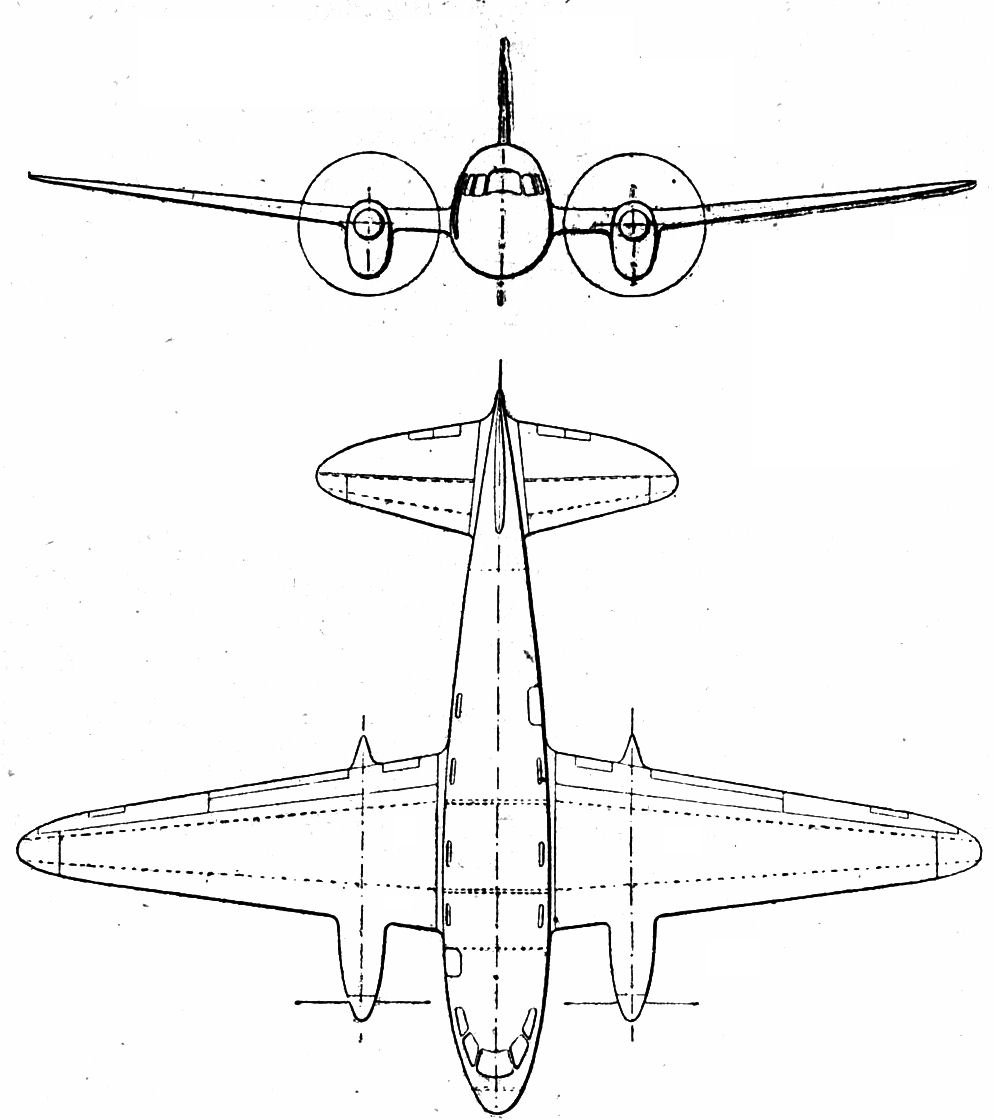
SNCASO SO 93 2-view drawing from L'Aerophile December 1945

Data from Jane's all the World's Aircraft 1947 The Encyclopedia of World Aircraft, French postwar transport aircraft, Les Avions Francais de 1944 a 1964

General characteristics

- Crew: 2
- Capacity: 10 pax or 13 m^{3} (460 cu ft) / 2,000 kg (4,400 lb) freight
- Length: 12.35 m (40 ft 6 in)
- Wingspan: 17.9 m (58 ft 9 in)
- Height: 4.29 m (14 ft 1 in)
- Wing area: 37.6 m^{2} (405 sq ft)
- Empty weight: 3,930 kg (8,664 lb)
- Gross weight: 5,605 kg (12,357 lb)
- Fuel capacity: 980 L (260 US gal; 220 imp gal)
- Powerplant: 2 × Renault 12S-02 V-12 inverted air-cooled piston engines, 430 kW (580 hp) each
- Propellers: 3-bladed constant-speed fully feathering propellers

Performance

- Maximum speed: 355 km/h (221 mph, 192 kn)
- Cruise speed: 335 km/h (208 mph, 181 kn) at 2,700 m (8,900 ft)
- Range: 1,300 km (810 mi, 700 nmi)
