= Lucien Servanty =

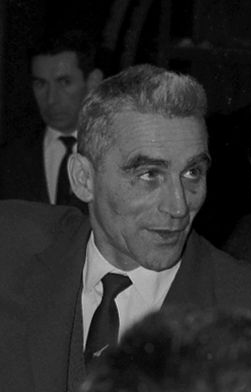
- Born: 1909; Paris, France
- Died: 7 October 1973 (aged 63–64); Toulouse, France
- Education: École des Arts et Métiers; Ingénieur diplômé par l'État (DPE aéronautique, 1943)
- Known for: Concorde, SO.6000 Triton
- Notable work: Bloch MB.150 redesign, SO.6000 Triton, Concorde
- Scientific career
- Fields: Aeronautical engineering
- Workplaces: Breguet, SNCASO

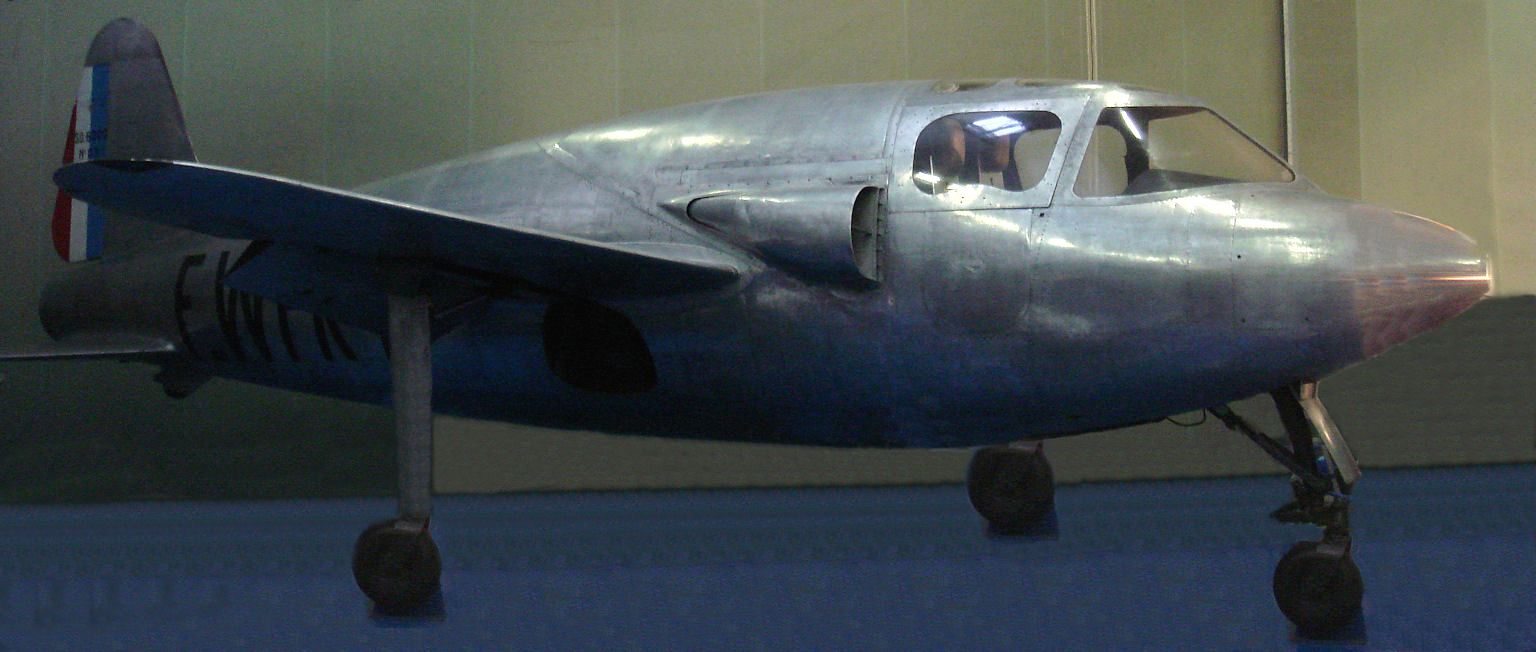
The SO.6000 Triton was designed by Lucien Servanty.

Lucien Servanty (born in 1909 in Paris, died 7 October 1973 in Toulouse) was a French aeronautical engineer. Ingénieur diplômé par l'État (DPE aéronautique 1943), he is also a graduate from the Ecole des Arts et Métiers. He joined Breguet in 1937, then worked at the SNCASO, where he was involved in the redesign of late variants of the Bloch MB.150 line. During World War II, he designed the SO.6000 Triton, France's first jet aircraft. But Lucien Servanty is probably best remembered today for being one of the main engineers behind Concorde (fastest general, public usage plane ever produced).
