= Musée aéronautique et spatial Safran =

Coordinates: 48.6066°N 2.6704°E

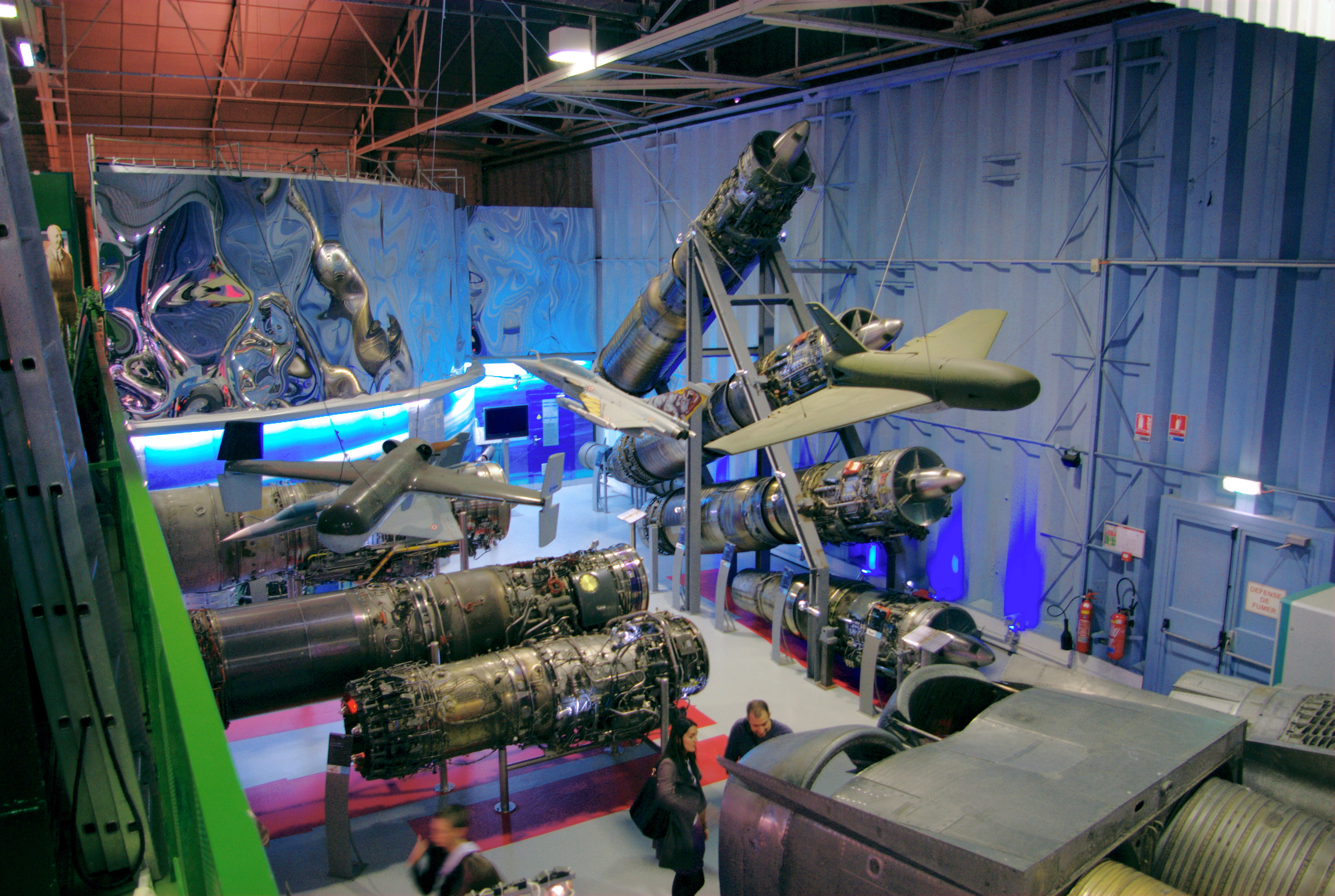
- Established: 31 May 1989
- Location: Melun, Seine-et-Marne
- Type: Aviation museum
- Website: www.museesafran.com

The Musée aéronautique et spatial Safran (English: Aeronautics and Space Museum Safran) is a French private aviation museum located in Melun, Seine-et-Marne. Established in May 1989 the museum contains a large collection of historic and modern aircraft engines. These engines have been produced by various French engine manufacturers such as Gnome et Rhône and Snecma which are now part of the present day Safran company. The latter is the creator and manager of the museum.

The main exhibits are piston engines and turbojets that powered aircraft as well as rocket engines used for aircraft and spacecraft. All the exhibits were developed and produced by companies that were eventually merged into the Safran group.

== History ==
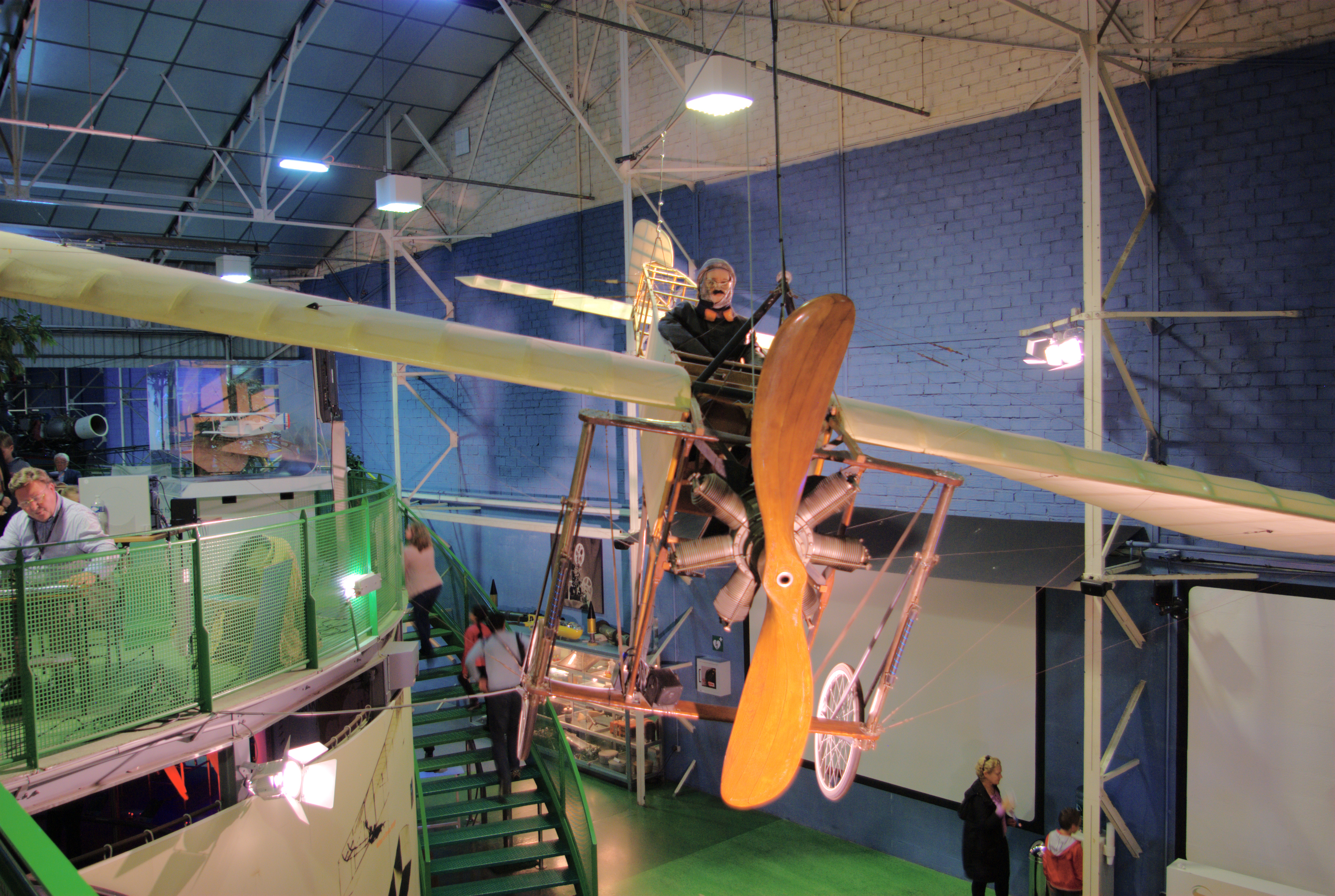
Blériot XI

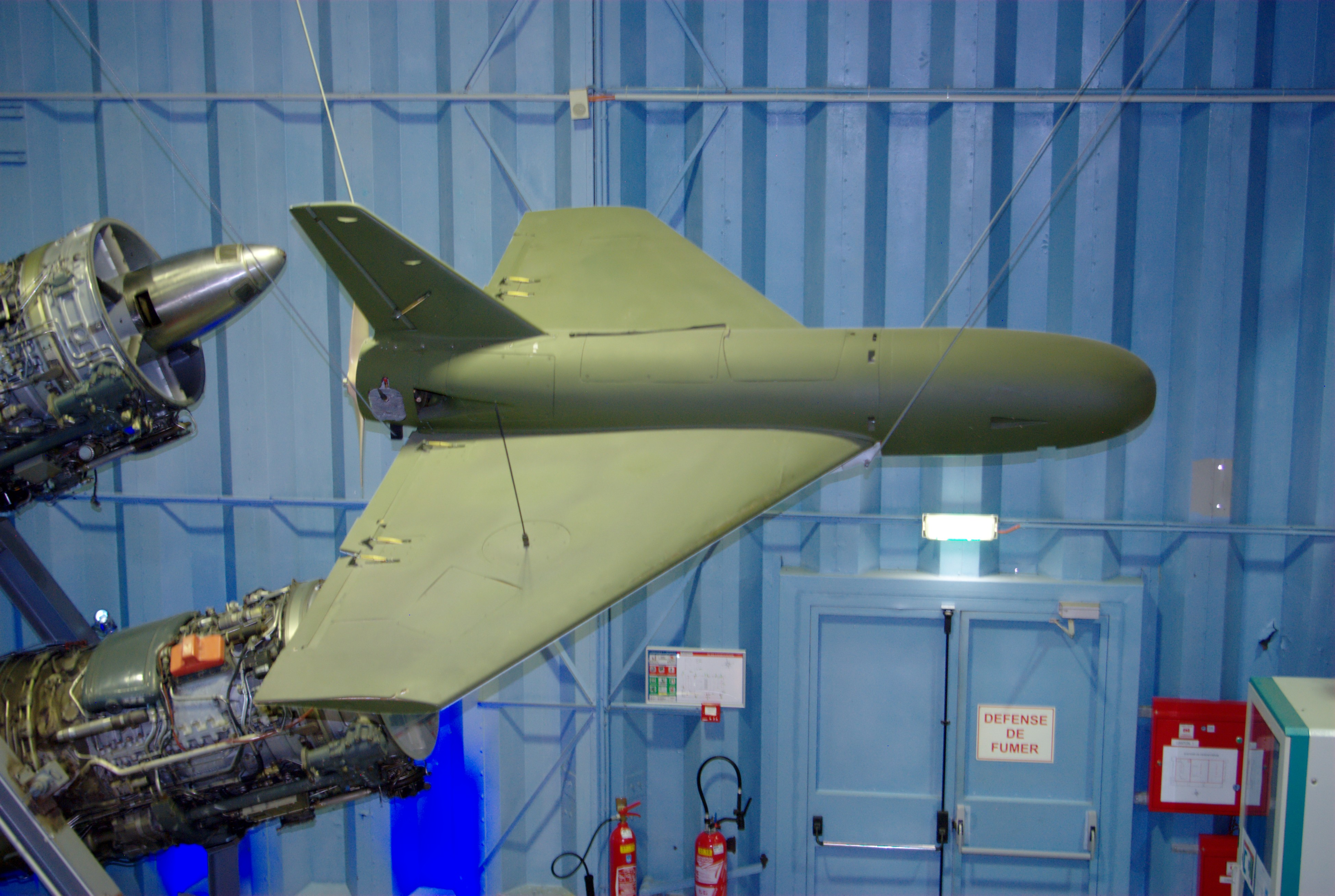
SAGEM Crecerelle UAV

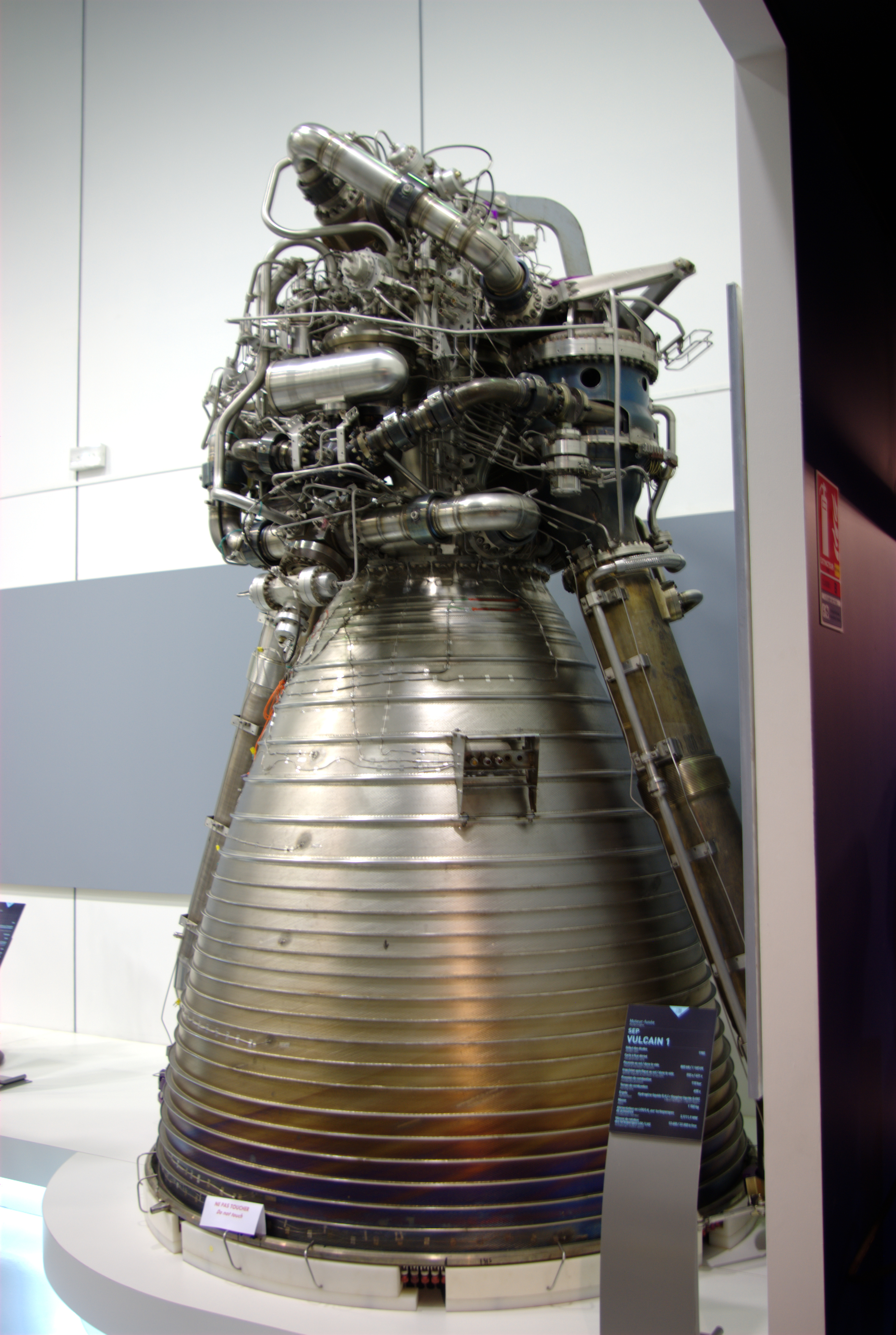
SEP Vulcain 1, rocket engine, used for the first stage of the Ariane 5 rocket

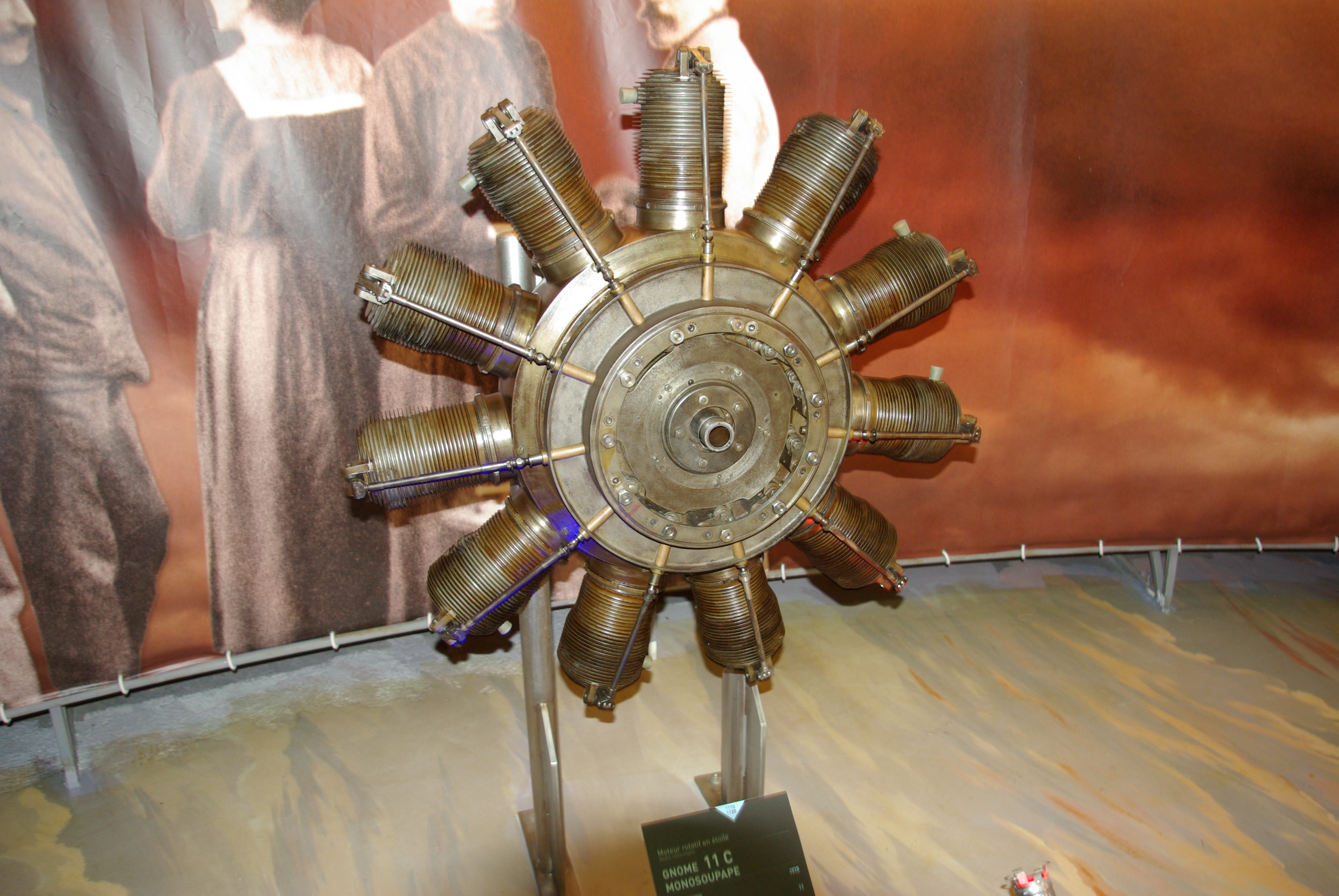
Gnome Monosoupape aircraft engine

In 1985 the Musée de l'Air et de l'Espace, Le Bourget held more than 1,000 historic aero engines. Snecma signed an agreement to allow their restoration and future care. The agreement stated that employees of Snecma would restore the engines as volunteers. In 1987 Snecma decided to create a new museum to display the restored engines, the museum was created on the site of its Villaroche establishment in Melun in a former seaplane hangar of 4,000 m^{2}. Inaugurated on 31 May 1989 the 'Association of Friends of the Museum Safran' manages the museum. In 2013 the museum was expanded to accommodate a section on space propulsion.

== Collections ==
The museum's collections are presented with a parallel theme depicting the history of aviation and aerospace. Exhibits include aircraft, piston engines, gas turbine engines, rocket engines, and aerospace items.

=== Piston engines ===
- Radial and rotary engines produced by Gnome and Gnome et Rhône
- Hispano-Suiza inline engines
- Renault inline engines

=== Gas turbines ===
- CFM International CFM56
- General Electric GE36 (mock-up)
- Rolls-Royce/Snecma Olympus 593
- Snecma Atar
- Snecma M88
- Turbomeca Astazou

=== Rocket engines ===
- Intercontinental ballistic missile stages
- Satellite rocket engines
- Viking
- Vulcain

=== Aircraft ===
- Blériot XI
- Sud Aviation Emouchet
- Sud Aviation Vautour

=== Other exhibits ===
The companies inherited by the Safran group also manufactured products unrelated to aviation which are also displayed. These exhibits include Gnome et Rhône motorcycles, missiles, submarines and tractors.

== Visitor information ==
The museum is located in Réau near Melun in the south of the Seine-et-Marne department. It is open every Wednesday and last Saturday of the month. Groups of at least 10 people can visit on other days by making a reservation. Admission is free.

== See also ==
- List of aerospace museums
