= Sud Aviation Vautour =

1951 French fighter-bomber aircraft family

Vautour
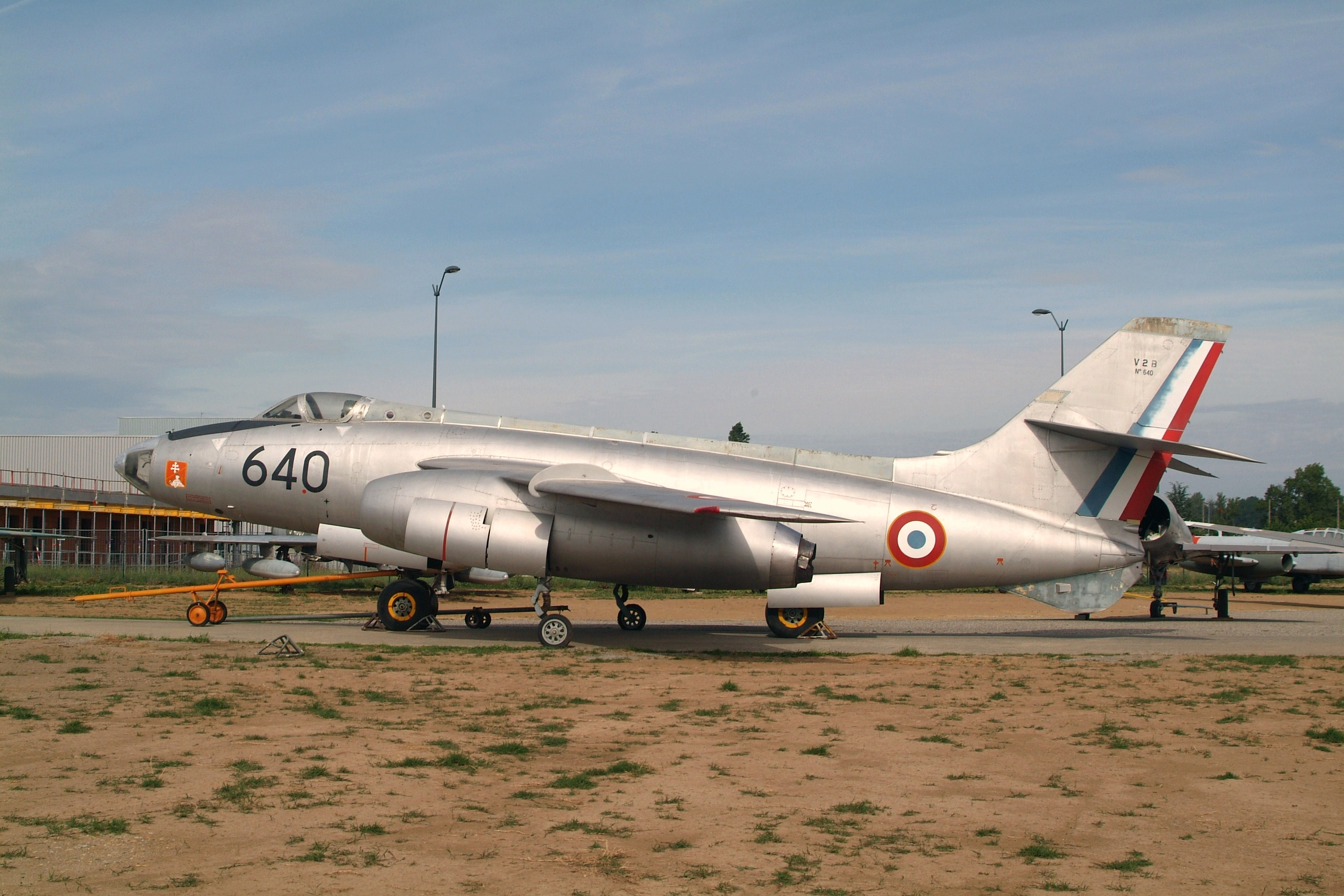
- Vautour IIB, French Air Force

General information
- Type: multirole aircraft
- Manufacturer: Sud Aviation
- Primary users: French Air Force Israeli Air Force

History
- Manufactured: 149
- Introduction date: 1956
- First flight: 16 October 1952
- Retired: 1979
- Developed from: SNCASO SO.4000

The Sud-Ouest Aviation (SNCASO) S.O. 4050 Vautour (French for vulture) is a French jet-powered multirole aircraft. The Vautour served as a bomber, ground attack, reconnaissance and interceptor aircraft.

Developed and manufactured by aircraft company Sud Aviation, the Vautour was operated by France's Armée de l'Air, having been originally designed in response to a requirement for a jet aircraft for bombing, low-level attack and all-weather interception. The Vautour was used in the Force de frappe under the Commandement des forces aériennes stratégiques; each aircraft was suitable for the carriage of a nuclear weapon. The shortcomings of the type as a bomber, such as its lack of radar or other advanced navigation/attack systems, led to the type being replaced by the more capable Dassault Mirage IV. The Vautour never saw combat with the French Air Force.

The only other user was the Israeli Air Force (IAF), for which the Vautour undertook various mission and roles, including combat. Vautours were used during the wars between Israel and its neighbors, including the Six-Day War and the War of Attrition. Only one air-to-air kill was recorded by a Vautour; the type was used more for bombing and ground strafing and was reportedly considered by Israel to be comparable to the Soviet-built Ilyushin Il-28 medium bombers used by its regional adversaries. During the early 1970s, the Israeli Vautours were replaced by Douglas A-4 Skyhawks.

== Development ==
=== Origins ===
In the aftermath of the Second World War, France set about the rebuilding and modernisation of its armed forces. In regards to aviation, this task had been made substantially more difficult due to setbacks incurred by the German occupation of France during the conflict; nearly all aircraft factories had been destroyed while individual design teams had scattered, meaning that there was little to no continuity of work and that the nation would be basically starting from scratch. Additionally, France had little technical knowledge or operational know-how with the newly developed field of jet propulsion in comparison to other powers, such as the United States and the United Kingdom. A major step towards bridging this gap was a licensing arrangement between Hispano-Suiza and British engine manufacturer Rolls-Royce Limited, under which the former would manufacture the Rolls-Royce Nene turbojet engine; accordingly, the majority of early French jet aircraft were powered by the Nene while an indigenous engine was to be developed in the form of the Snecma Atar engine.

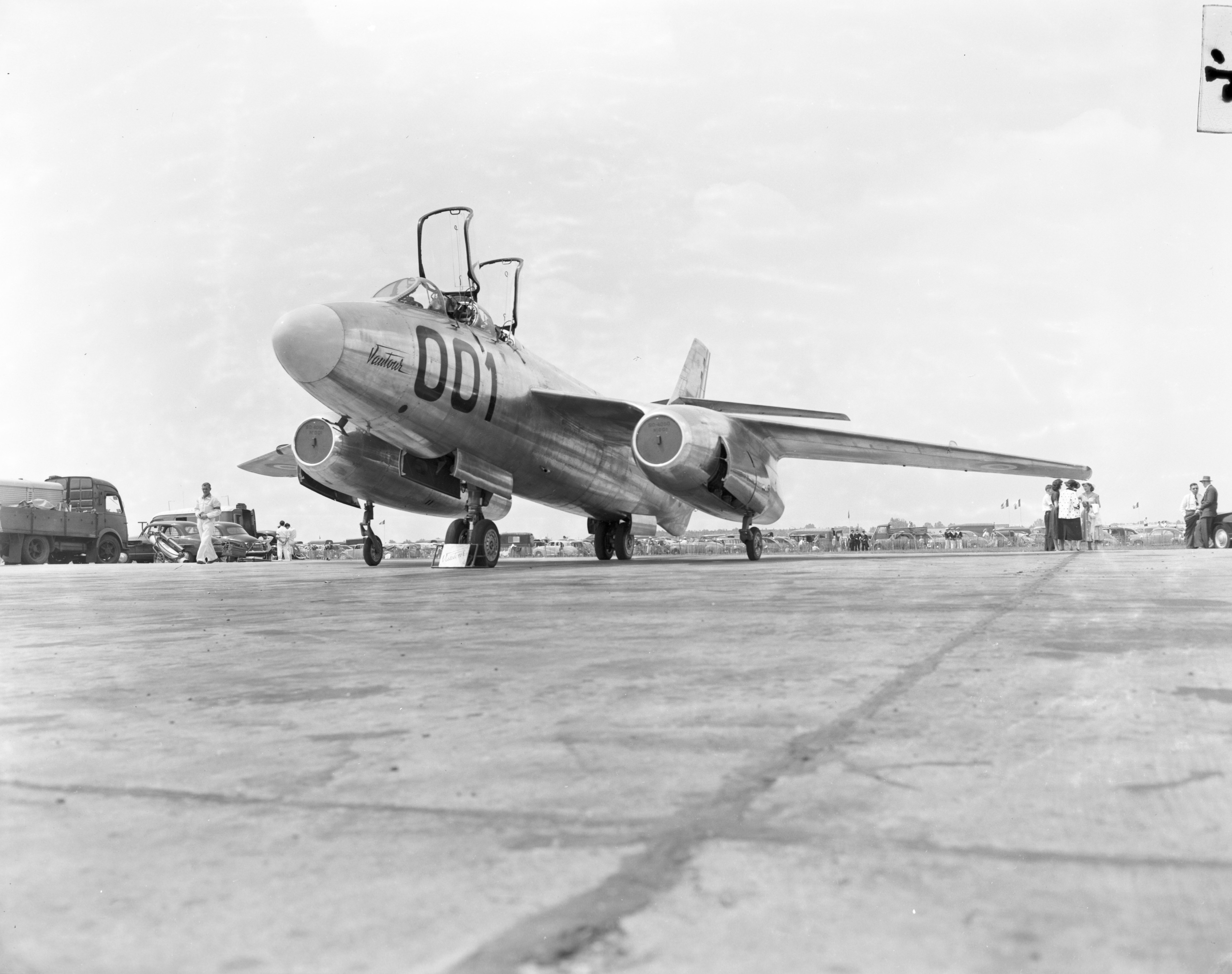
A Vautour prototype at the Paris Air Show in 1953

During June 1951, the French Armée de l'Air (AdA) issued a detailed requirement for a jet-powered aircraft capable of functioning in several roles, including as a bomber, a low-level attack aircraft, or an all-weather interceptor. In response to this requirement, French aircraft manufacturer SNCASO decided to adapt its existing S.O. 4000 design so that it could perform the desired missions roles. During 1951, test flight of the S.O.4000 prototype had demonstrated promising performance for the type, supporting the decision to proceed with a further development of the design. According to aviation authors Bill Gunston and Peter Gilchrist, "It would be fair to claim that in the early 1950s the Vautour was the most promising twin-jet warplane in Western Europe". An initial order for three prototypes was placed by the AdA. On 16 October 1952, the first prototype of the revised design, which had been designated as the S.O. 4050, conducted its maiden flight.

The flight test programme proceeded relatively smoothly; during one early flight, a prototype was recorded as having exceeded Mach 1 during a shallow dive. A follow-on order for six pre-production aircraft was soon received; one of these was powered by a pair of Armstrong Siddeley Sapphire engines while another was furnished with Rolls-Royce Avon engines, both British designs, while the remainder were powered by the French Atar engine. Subsequent production aircraft would use the Atar engine, having proven to be sufficiently mature and, with the aid of water injection, capable of sufficient power to enable the Vautour to take off while carrying a full payload.

=== Production and further development ===
Subsequently given the name Vautour II, the aircraft was manufactured in three distinct variants. During 1958, the aircraft entered service with the AdA; the Vautour would remain in use by the AdA for several decades. While the final French aircraft being retired from frontline service during 1979, a number were retained and soldiered on in various secondary duties into the early 1980s. The Vautour ultimately saw no combat usage during its service with the AdA; throughout the majority of its service life, the type was maligned as obsolete and relatively underpowered. Although it had been a moderately competent aircraft when it had been originally developed, the Vautour never benefitted from the adoption of sufficiently powerful engines, even though suitable powerplants did become available over time. As an interceptor, it was soon outclassed by the newer Dassault Mirage III, while in its roles either as a bomber or attack aircraft, the lack of an advanced navigation/attack system became a crippling limitation upon its effectiveness.

The only export customer for the Vautour was Israel, who had chosen to procure a number of other types of combat aircraft from France as well. During the 1950s, France and Israel closely cooperated on various areas of defence, including armaments, aviation, and nuclear research. Reportedly, a major motivating factor in the Israeli decision to procure the Vautour was to make a political statement to the country's neighbours, viewing the aircraft as a counterpart, and a response, to the Soviet-built Ilyushin Il-28 medium bombers, which had been acquired by Egypt.

During 1956, two years prior to the Vautour even entering squadron service, France had issued a more demanding requirement for a supersonic replacement aircraft. The Vautour was used as a stop-gap measure as the airborne carrier of France's independent nuclear deterrent while the more capable follow-on aircraft was being selected and developed; its performance in this role was typically thought to be limited at best. While the newer bomber requirement would ultimately result in the selection, development and manufacture of the Dassault Mirage IV bomber; Sud Aviation had also chosen to respond to the requirement, producing their own proposal for the production of an envisioned Super Vautour. The unbuilt 'stretched' Super Vautour variant would have featured an increased combat radius of 1,700 miles as well as the ability to attain at least Mach 0.9.

== Design ==
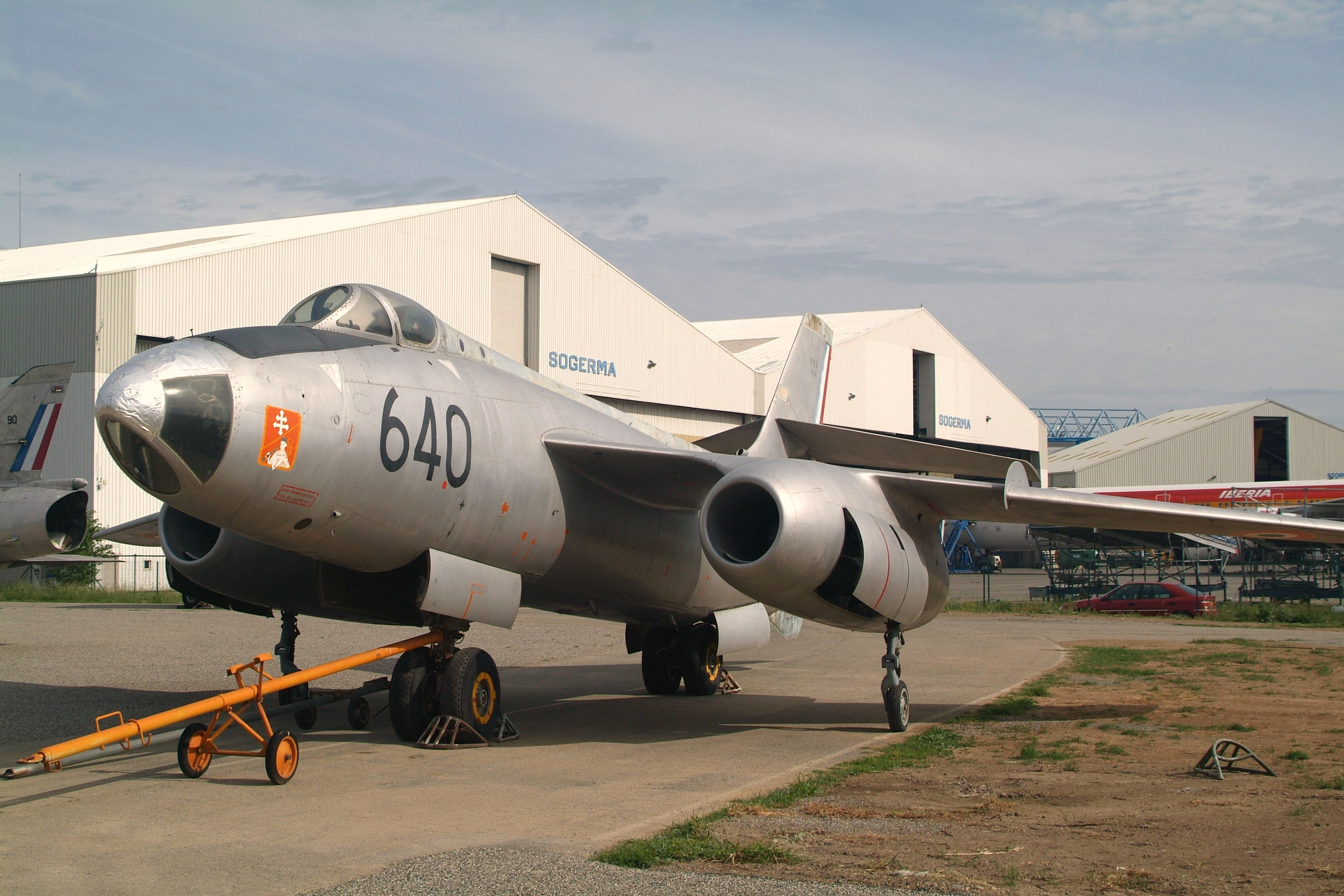
A production Vautour bomber in French markings

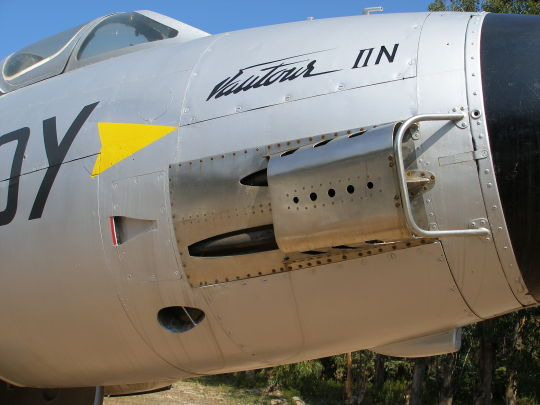
The right-side cannon muzzles on a French Vautour interceptor

The Sud Aviation Vautour was a jet-propelled mid-sized combat aircraft, typically employed as a bomber and attack aircraft, as well as having some usage as an interceptor. In terms of its basic configuration, it had a shoulder-wing monoplane configuration, furnished with a 35° swept wing and a "flying" tail. Power was provided by a pair of SNECMA Atar 101 turbojet engines, which were carried in pods located underneath the wings. The Vautour was equipped with a bicycle-type landing gear configuration in which the main units were located upon the underside of the fore and aft fuselage, these were augmented by smaller stabilizing gear set into bottom of the engine pods. The internal space of the central fuselage was largely dedicated to a large 5 m (16 ft) weapons bay, along with substantial internal fuel tankage.

The Vautour IIB bomber lacked any sort of radar arrangement or many of the contemporary navigational aids and attack systems that were installed upon several aircraft performing the same role during this era. Aiming of the armaments was performed by a bombardier, who would principally perform his bomb-aiming function using a Second World War-vintage American-built Norden bombsight. The navigator/bombardier position was within the nose section, which was glazed to provide external visibility. Both the Vautour IIB and IIA models were restricted to performing missions only under clear-weather operations during daylight. The Vautour IIN interceptor model was not as restrictive, having some capacity to conduct both nighttime and adverse weather operations, having been furnished with a radar system. During its service in Israel, where the weather of the local climate was generally favorable and daylight missions commonplace, the Vautour's lack of advanced targeting and navigation equipment was found to be not a crippling limitation. However, when operated in Europe, these restrictions were considered to be a major disadvantage. As a result, the French AdA never deployed their single-seat Vautour IIA fleet in a frontline capacity; the majority of its IIB bombers were quickly converted to the improved Vautour IIBR standard, which was used to perform photo reconnaissance missions instead.

The Vautour was capable of being equipped with various armaments. In Israeli service, it was typically armed with a pair of 30 mm cannons, as well as up to four removable underwing rocket pods, containing up to 19 air-to-ground rockets each; up to 3,000 kg (6,600 lb) of bombs or alternatively a maximum of 232 68 mm rockets could be accommodated internally in the bomb bay. 4,000 kg (8,800 lb) of bombs could also be mounted externally. The Vautour IIB bomber could be used to carry nuclear weapons in addition to its conventional arsenal. The internal bomb bay of an aircraft could contain either one AN-11 or one AN-22 nuclear bomb; in AdA service, the primary carrier of nuclear weapons would quickly be changed to the newer and more capable Dassault Mirage IV, which supplemented and eventually replace the Vautour IIB bomber.

== Operational history ==
Originally, the AdA had intended to order a total of 440 Vautours, comprising 300 of the IIA model and 140 of the IIN variant. However, plans were modified; ultimately no Vautour IIAs would enter AdA service and around 30 were believed to be constructed, 18 of which being sold to Israel at a relatively low price. In place of the IIA, the Vautour IIB was procured instead, which was suitable for performing level bombing runs across all altitudes, as well as the low altitude toss bombing attack profile. To address a deficiency of the Vautour that had been determined mid-service life, this being its limited range in comparison to contemporary strategic bombers, considerable emphasis was placed upon the introduction and perfection of aerial refueling techniques in the AdA. This led to the adoption of a 'buddy pack' to enable pairs of Vautours to refuel one another in mid-air, allowing for the range factor to be better addressed.

A fleet of 40 AdA-operated Vautour IIBs constituted the original air-based component of the French force de frappe, the Commandement des Forces Aériennes Stratégiques (CFAS) of the French Air Force, which had been established during 1955. However, their use in the strategic bomber role was determined to be less than optimal; allegedly, the Vautour's performance was commonly considered to be marginal and suitable for use as a stop gap measure at best. The deficiencies of the type contributed to France issuing a more stringent requirement calling for a new high performance bomber aircraft to be developed to perform the strategic mission. While efforts were made by Sud Aviation to design improved variants of the Vautour to conform with the new demands, the AdA opted to pursue rival aircraft company Dassault Aviation's proposal, which eventually resulted in the deployment of the Mirage IV, which eventually succeeded the Vautour in the bombing role in French service.

As early as 1955, preliminary agreements for Israel's procurement of the Vautour were being drawn up and advanced plans being laid for its deployment. During early 1957, the type was officially selected to replace the British-built de Havilland Mosquito then in service with the Israeli Air Force (IAF). On 1 August 1957, the first Vautour arrived in Israel, delivered secretly via French air bases in Tunisia and with AdA markings. The planes were delivered at a rate of 1 or 2 per month. Their entry into service had allegedly been delayed by several months due to political issues between Israel and France, which was resolved when permission to commence operations was granted by the latter. Deliveries of the type were completed in 1958. During August 1958, the existence of Israeli Vautours was publicly revealed in an air display.

Crosbie described the Vautour as being "Israel's most important delivery system at the time", also observing the type to possess the capability to launch attacks upon the majority of Egyptian targets while carrying a payload of 3,000 to 4,000 kilograms (6,600 to 8,800 lb) bombs. The IAF fielded a pair of squadrons equipped with the type. In Israeli service, the Vautour was used to perform many different roles, the IIN variant were initially tasked with night fighter operations, before transitioning to the attack role or being converted to perform aerial reconnaissance or electronic warfare operations. The Vautour proved to be quite capable as a reconnaissance aircraft; on 23 January 1962, one overflew across Egypt to the Libyan border, evading repeated attempts at interception; during the following years, the type was used to gather evidence of Soviet-provided surface to air missiles (SAM)s present in Egypt. Likewise, in the electronic warfare mission, the aircraft proved effective at disabling Egyptian air defenses via onboard jamming equipment.

In Israeli service, the Vautour had a relatively active combat career. As early as 1959, the type was being used against Egyptian targets; the Vautour would also participate in a series of actions throughout major conflicts between Israel and its neighbours, including the Six-Day War and the War of Attrition. Israeli Vautours were normally used to conduct bombing and strafing runs, along with several air-to-air engagements. During the Six-Day War, Israeli Vautours engaged in air-to-air combat with Iraqi Air Force aircraft while in the process of performing raiding missions against H-3 airfield in Iraq's western region. On 6 June 1967, Captain Ben-Zion Zohar scored the type's only aerial victory, having downed an Iraqi Hawker Hunter during one such engagement; however a pair of Vautours were downed after being struck by cannon fire from Iraqi Hunters the following day. Overall, a total of 15 Vautours were recorded as lost in combat. Remaining examples of the type were retired in 1971 in favor of the American-built Douglas A-4 Skyhawk; the last aircraft left operational service in March 1972, their final role being decoy aircraft flown in the vicinity of the Sinai. The Israelis were pleased with the Vautour's range and versatility, and it was well regarded in Israeli service.

== Variants ==
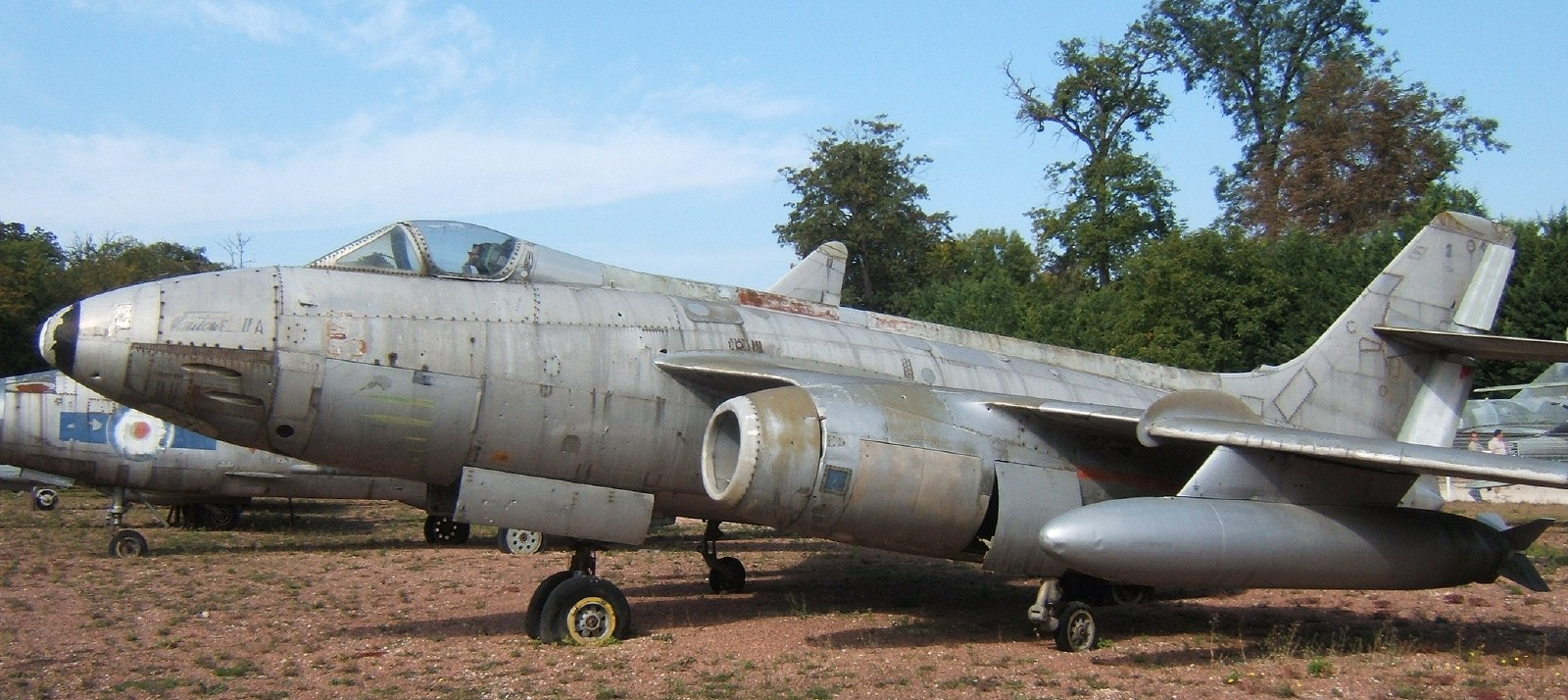
Vautour II A

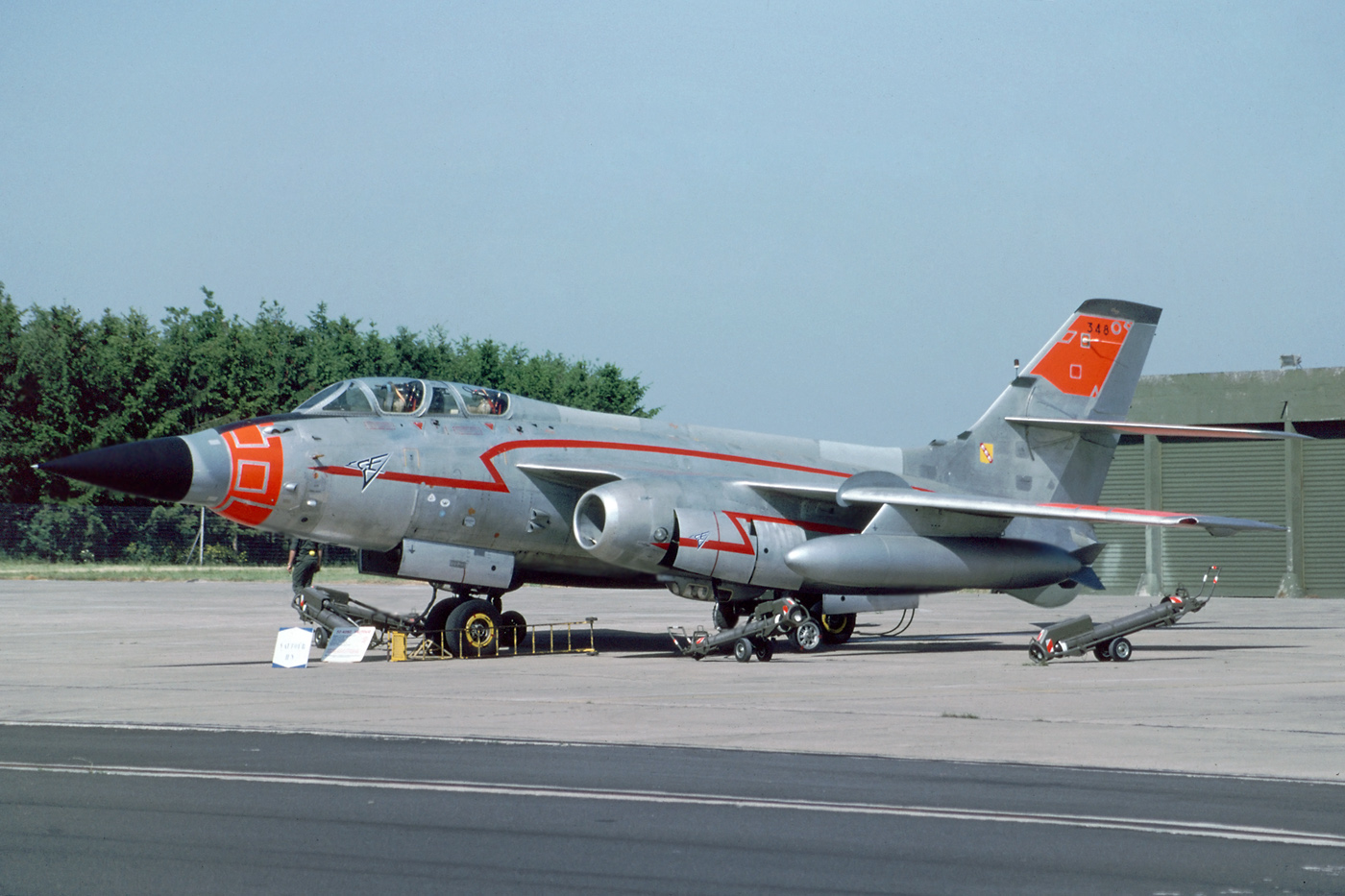
A Vautour equipped with a nose radar for testing by the Centre d'essais en vol

- S.O. 4050-01 : Two-seat all-weather fighter prototype, powered by two 23.5-kN (5,291-lb) Atar 101B turbojet engines. First flew on 16 October 1952. One built.
- S.O. 4050-02 : Single-seat ground-attack prototype, powered by two 27.6-kN (6,217-lb) Atar 101D turbojet engines. First flew on 16 December 1953. One built.
- S.O. 4050-03 : Two-seat bomber prototype, powered by two Armstrong Siddeley Sapphire turbojet engines. First flew on 5 December 1954. One built.

The Vautour was produced in three principal variants, which had 90% commonality:

- IIA: Single-seat, long-range attack aircraft, armed with cannon and bombs (carried internally or on four underwing pylons)
- IIN: Two-seat, all-weather interceptor with DRAC-25A or DRAC-32A radar in nose, pilot and co-pilot in tandem seats, armed with cannon, air-to-air missiles, and (theoretically) unguided rockets. The designation was later changed to II-1N.
- IIB: Two-seat bomber with glazed nose position for bombardier/observer replacing cannon pack, carrying bombs internally and on underwing pylons.

Some IIB aircraft were converted to various specialized roles, principally reconnaissance (IIBR and IIBN), electronic countermeasures, and eventually target tug (IIB-TT).

=== Production ===
Total production was 149 aircraft, divided as follows:

- Prototypes: 3
- Pre-production: 6
- IIA: 30 (13 for France, 17 for Israel)
- IIB: 40 (36 for France, 4 for Israel)
- IIN: 70 (63 for France, 7 for Israel)

== Operators ==
France

- Armée de l’Air received 112 aircraft.
  - 92e Escadre de Bombardement operated the Vautour IIB and between 1970 and 1978, some Vautour IINs
    - Escadron de Bombardement 1/92 "Bourgogne"
    - Escadron de Bombardement 2/92 "Aquitaine"
  - Bombing Training Center operated Vautour IIB variant
  - 30e Escadre de Chasse Tout Temps operated the Vautour IIN and used several Vautour IIAs for training purposes
    - 1/30 "Loire"
    - 3/30 "Lorraine".

Israel

- Israeli Air Force received 31 aircraft, operating the type between May 1958 and April 1972
  - 110 Squadron based at Ramat David operated 19 Vautour IIA and four Vautour IIB aircraft
  - 119 Squadron based at Tel-Nof operated eight Vautour IINs.
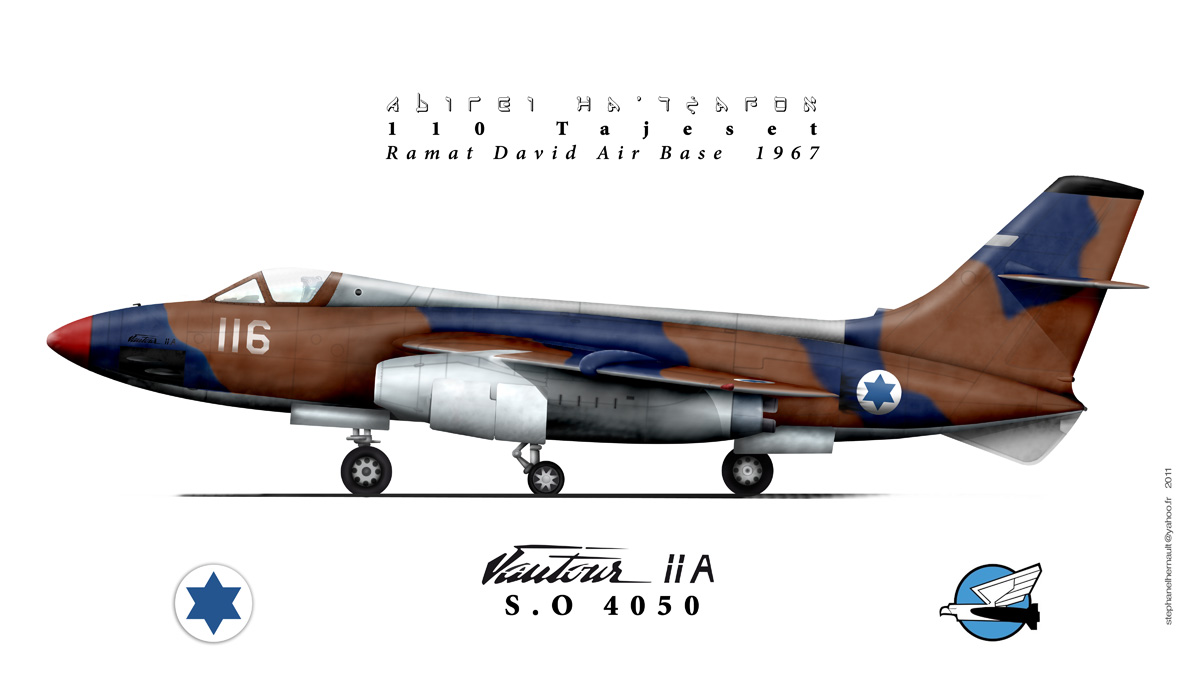
Vautour A

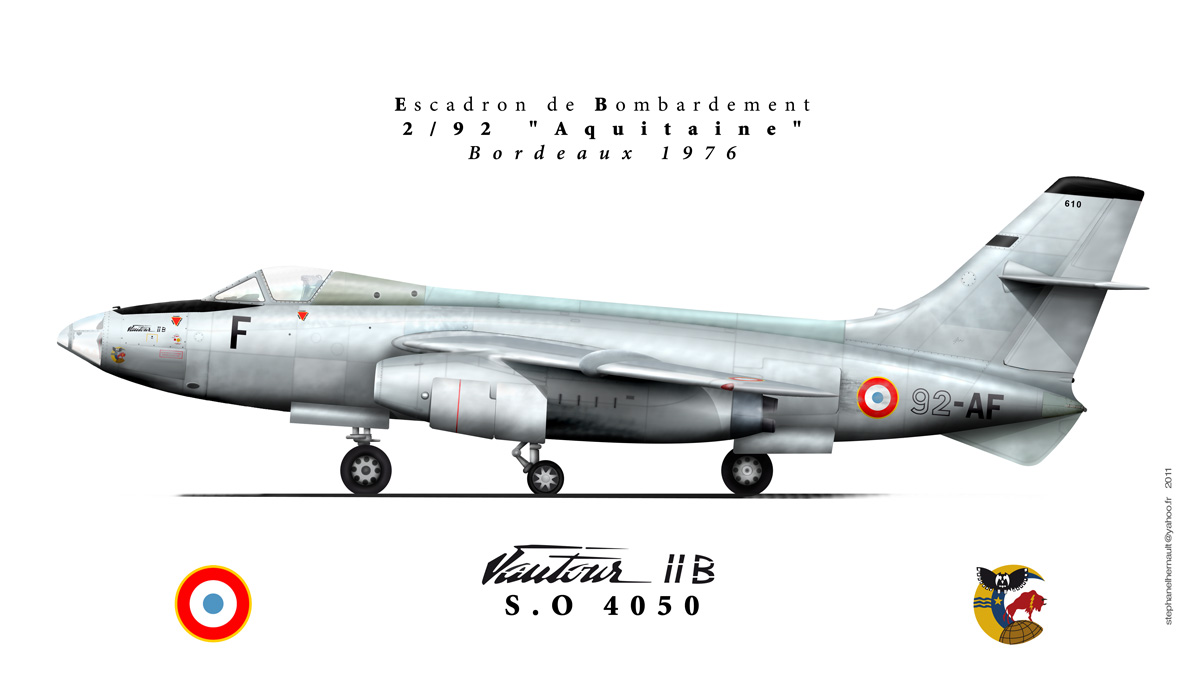
Vautour B

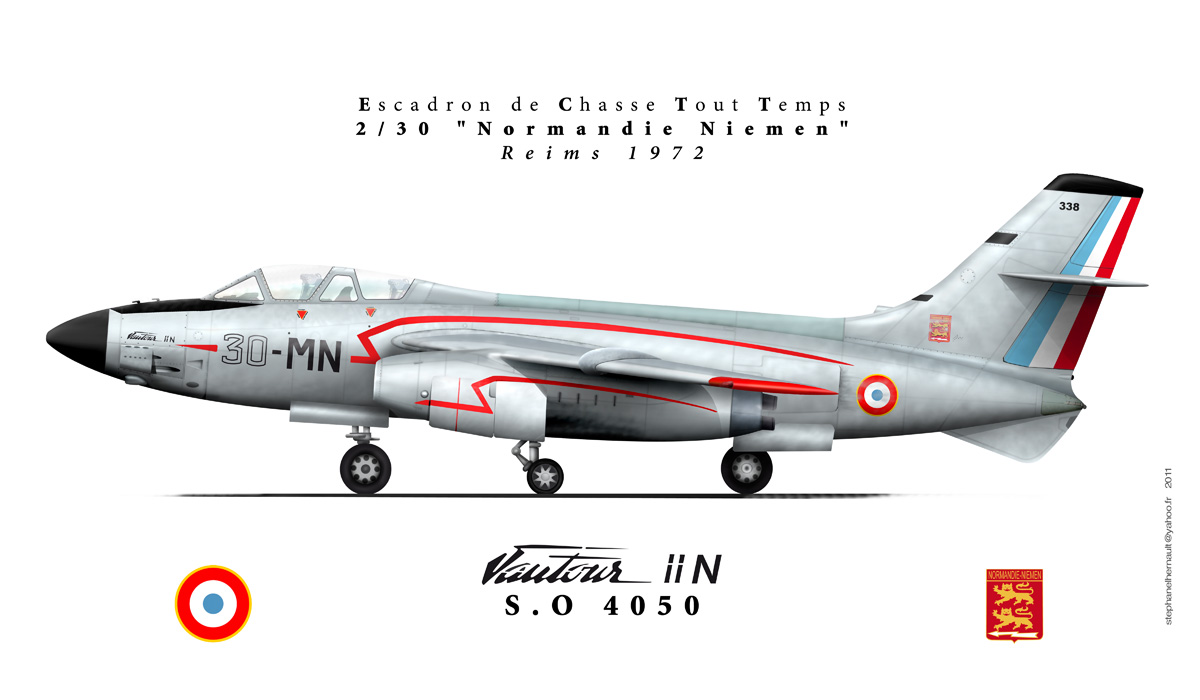
Vautour N

== Aircraft on display ==
Former French Air Force aircraft:

- Vautour IIN n°304 preserved at Musée Européen de l'Aviation de Chasse de Montélimar
- Vautour IIN n°307 preserved at Musée de l'Air et de l'Espace (aircraft in storage)
- Vautour IIN n°308 preserved at CANOPEE Châteaudun
- Vautour IIN n°330 preserved at Musée de l'Air et de l'Espace (aircraft in storage, restored between 1997 and 2002)
- Vautour IIN n°337 displayed in front of the Musée Aéronautique et Spatial Safran (Safran Aircraft Engines Villaroche, France)
- Vautour IIN n°347 preserved at Saint-Dizier air base
- Vautour IIN n°358 preserved by the association "Les amis de la 5e escadre" at Orange
- Vautour IIN n°364 displayed at Musée Rozanoff of the Base Aérienne 118 (Mont-de-Marsan Air Base)
- Vautour IIB n°615 preserved at CANOPEE Châteaudun
- Vautour IIB n°634 preserved at Musée de l'Air et de l'Espace (aircraft in storage)
- Vautour IIB n°640 preserved by the association "Ailes Anciennes de Toulouse"

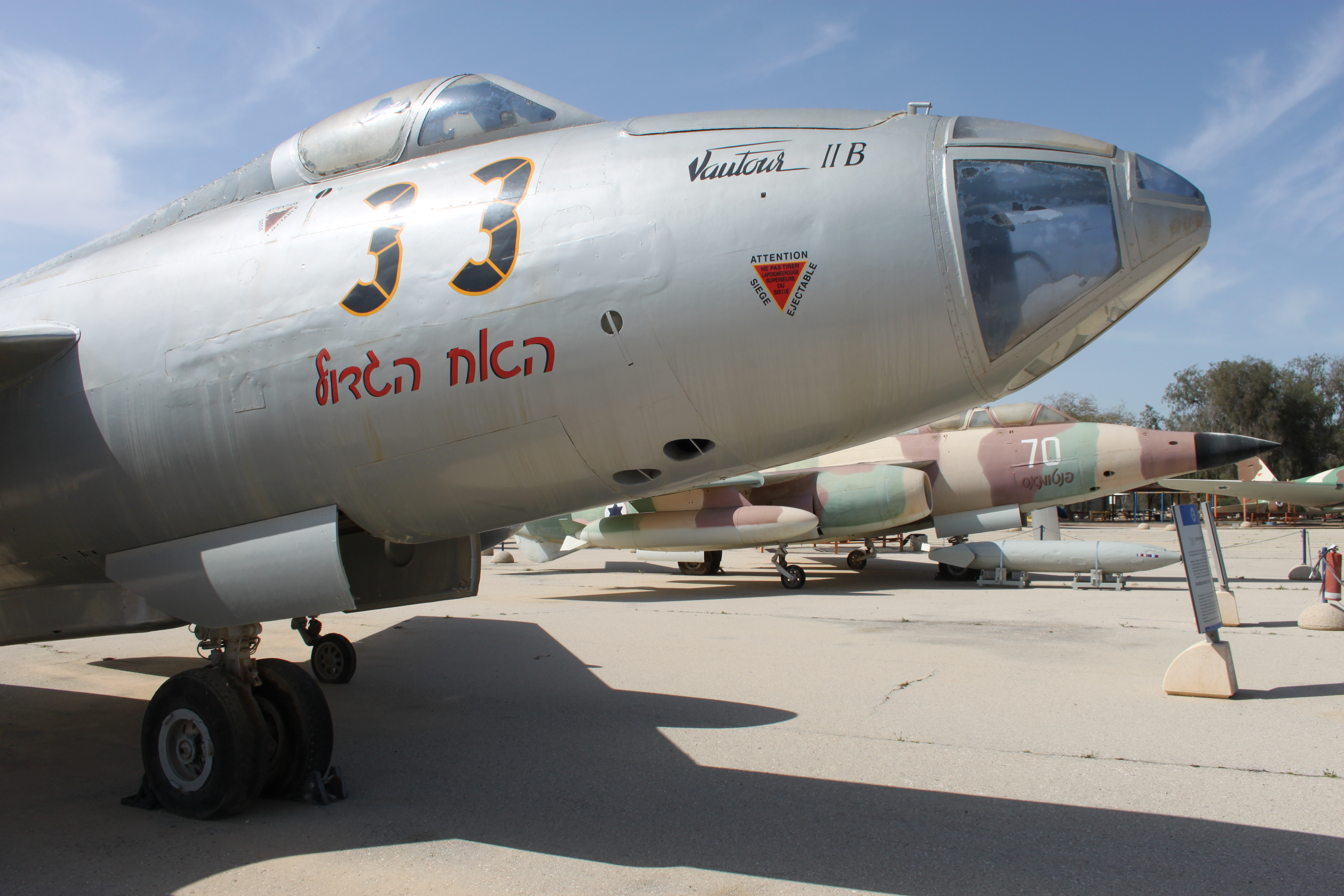
Vautour IIB n°33 and Vautour IIN n°70 at the Israeli Air Force Museum in Hatzerim

Former Israeli Air Force Vautours (all on display at the Israeli Air Force Museum) :

- Vautour IIA 09 "Hamashhit"
- Vautour IIB 33 "Big Brother"
- Vautour IIN 70 "Phantomas"

== Specifications (Vautour IIA) ==
Vautour IIN

Data from Jet Bombers: From the Messerschmitt Me 262 to the Stealth B-2,

General characteristics

- Crew: 1
- Length: 15.57 m (51 ft 1 in)
- Wingspan: 15.1 m (49 ft 6 in)
- Height: 4.94 m (16 ft 2 in)
- Wing area: 45 m^{2} (480 sq ft)
- Empty weight: 10,000 kg (22,046 lb)
- Gross weight: 17,500 kg (38,581 lb)
- Max takeoff weight: 21,000 kg (46,297 lb)
- Powerplant: 2 × SNECMA Atar 101E-3 turbojet engines, 34.3 kN (7,700 lbf) thrust each

Performance

- Maximum speed: 1,106 km/h (687 mph, 597 kn) at sea level
- Maximum speed: Mach 0.9
- Range: 5,400 km (3,400 mi, 2,900 nmi)
- Service ceiling: 15,200 m (49,900 ft)
- Rate of climb: 60 m/s (12,000 ft/min)
- Wing loading: 403 kg/m^{2} (83 lb/sq ft)
- Thrust/weight: 0.4

Armament

- Guns: 4 × 30 mm DEFA cannon, 100 rounds per gun
- Internal weapons bay: Maximum of 2,725 kg (6,000 lb) of bombs (typically six 450 kg (1,000 lb) bombs), pack of 116 × 68 mm (2.7 in) rockets, camera pack, or two 1,500 liter (400 U.S. gal) fuel tanks
- Hardpoints: Four underwing pylons each rated at 1,500 kg (3,300 lb) inboard and 500 kg (1,100 lb) outboard with a capacity of 4,000 kg (8,800 lb); maximum practical total weapons load on external hard points 4,400 kg (9,700 lb) of bombs, rockets, missiles or napalm tanks

== See also ==
- Rotem Crisis

Aircraft of comparable role, configuration, and era

- As fighter-bomber / light bomber:
  - Blackburn Buccaneer
  - Douglas A-3 Skywarrior
  - Douglas B-66 Destroyer
  - English Electric Canberra
  - Ilyushin Il-28/Hong H-5
- As all-weather interceptor:
  - Avro Canada CF-100 Canuck
  - Gloster Javelin
  - Yakovlev Yak-25
  - Yakovlev Yak-28
