= SNCASO SO.7060 Deauville =

S.O.7060 Deauville
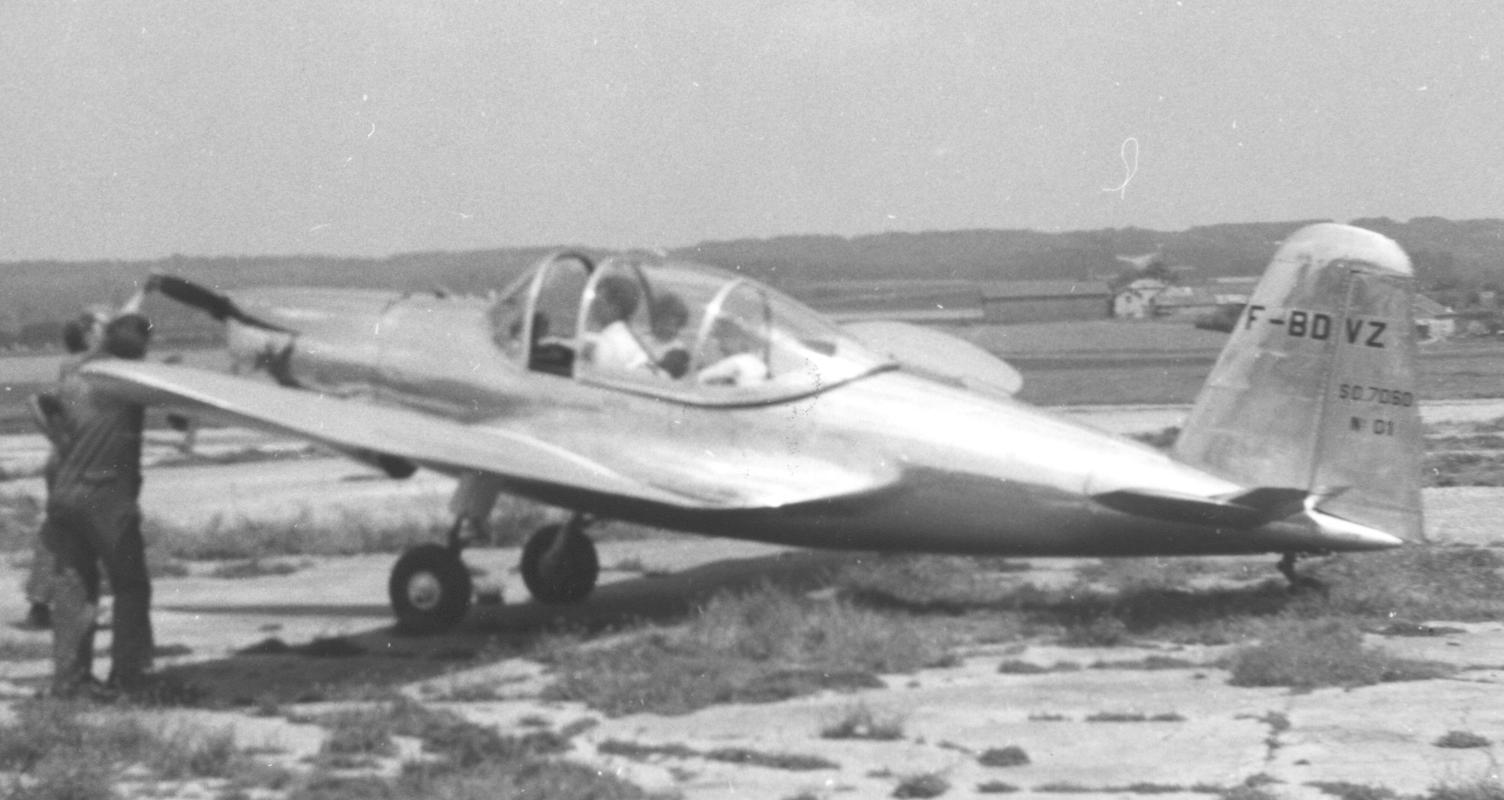
- The first S.O.7060 Deauville being started up at St Cyr l'Ecole airfield near Paris in May 1957

General information
- Type: light civil aircraft
- National origin: France
- Manufacturer: SNCASO
- Status: no longer extant
- Number built: 2 (originally built as the SO.7050 and the SO.7055)

History
- Introduction date: 1948
- First flight: 22 March 1948
- Retired: c.1970

The SNCASO S.O.7050, S.O.7055, S.O.7056 and S.O.7060 Deauville were single-engine light French civil utility aircraft of the 1940s. Only two airframes were built but were modified with different undercarriages, engines and seating.

== Development ==
In 1947 SNCASO built two similar light aircraft both carrying the name Deauville. The first, the S.O.7050 which flew on 11 June had a tricycle undercarriage. The second, the S.O.7055 flew on 1 July with a tailwheel undercarriage. The first and possibly the second machine was powered by a 56 kW (75 hp) Mathis 4GO flat-four engine, though the S.O.7055 had a 56 kW (75 hp) Minié 4.DC.32 flat-four at some point. It was later modified into the SO.7056. In 1948 both airframes were re-engined with 78 kW (105 hp) Walter Minor 4-III engines and a third seat was added behind the two front side-by-side seats to produce the S.O.7060 Deauville. The undercarriage of the S.O.7050 was modified to be like that of the SO.7056, so both S.O.7060s had tailwheel gear.

The Deauvilles were of all-metal construction with low/mid set wings of constant chord, straight tapered tail surfaces and a fixed tailwheel undercarriage. The canopy was entirely transparent and slid back to permit the access of pilot and passengers. Dual controls were provided.

== Operational history ==
The first airframe F-BDVZ was flown by its makers in S.O.7060 form for several years and then by an aero club based at St-Cyr-l'Ecole airfield to the west of Paris during the later 1950s and through the 1960s. The aircraft remained on the French civil aircraft register in May 1967, but was no longer registered in 1973 and it has not survived in preservation.

== Variants ==
S.O.7050 Deauville
The first aircraft in its original form, with the Mathis engine and tricycle gear, first flown 11 June 1947.

S.O.7055 Deauville
The second, with conventional gear and at least part of the time with the Minié 4Dc-32 engine instead of the Mathis. First flown on 1 July 1947.
S.O.7056 Deauville
The S.O.7055 modified.

S.O.7060 Deauville
The S.O.7050 and the S.O.7056 re-engined with Walter Minor 4-III engines, both with tailwheel undercarriages, and with a third seat behind the side by side front seats. First flown on 22 March 1948.

== Specifications (S.O.7060) ==
Data from Green, 1956, p. 176

General characteristics

- Crew: 1/2
- Capacity: 1/2 passengers
- Length: 21 ft 10 in (6.65 m)
- Wingspan: 34 ft 0 in (10.36 m)
- Height: 7 ft 11 in (2.41 m)
- Wing area: 161.4 sq ft (14.99 m^{2})
- Empty weight: 1,140 lb (517 kg)
- Gross weight: 1,760 lb (798 kg)
- Powerplant: 1 × Walter Minor 4-III , 105 hp (78 kW)

Performance

- Maximum speed: 127 mph (204 km/h, 110 kn)
- Cruise speed: 105 mph (169 km/h, 91 kn)
- Range: 500 mi (800 km, 430 nmi)
