= SNCASO SO.8000 Narval =

French carrier-based strike fighter designed by Sud-Ouest in the late 1940s

SO.8000 Narval
- The second prototype of the SO.8000 Narval, early 1949

General information
- Type: Carrier-based strike fighter
- National origin: France
- Manufacturer: SNCASO
- Status: Cancelled
- Number built: 2 prototypes

History
- First flight: 1 April 1949

The SNCASO SO.8000 Narval (English: Narwhal) was a French carrier-based strike fighter designed by Sud-Ouest in the late 1940s. The French Navy (Marine nationale) ordered two prototypes in 1946 and they made their maiden flights three years later. They were plagued by aerodynamic problems and unreliability issues with their piston engines. The aircraft proved to be slow, lacking in lateral and longitudinal stability and unsuitable for carrier operations; it did not enter production.

== Design and development ==
The French Navy ordered two prototype SO.8000 strike fighters on 31 May 1946. If the prototypes were successful, it planned to order five pre-production models and sixty-five production aircraft to equip its aircraft carriers. Designer Jean Dupuy developed a twin-boom pusher configuration design with a crescent wing and tricycle landing gear. The horizontal stabilizer was connected at the tops of the vertical stabilizers at the ends of the booms to avoid turbulence from the contra-rotating propeller. The pilot was provided with an ejection seat and the aircraft was intended to be fitted with six 20-millimeter (0.8 in) MG 151 autocannon in the nose and to be able to carry 1,000 kilograms (2,200 lb) of ordnance under the wings. A radar system was planned to be fitted in the lower front portion of the booms while the fuel was stowed between the cockpit and the engine. Dupuy wanted to use a British Rolls-Royce Griffon engine, but it proved to be too difficult to obtain. He planned to substitute a Hispano-Suiza 12Z instead, but the engine was still too immature to be used and he had to settle for an Arsenal 12H (a copy of the Junkers Jumo 213) driving the contra-rotating propeller. Ducts on the sides of the fuselage provided air for the engine radiator while the engine's air was provided by a prominent scoop on the left side of the fuselage.

Only the first prototype was intended to be fitted with the nose guns, so the second prototype was completed first, beginning taxiing tests in December 1948. Test pilot Jacques Guignard attempted to make the first flight on 13 January 1949, but he was unable to take off despite achieving a speed of 200 kilometers per hour (124 mph). Despite some modifications made to alleviate the problem, the second prototype still failed to take off on 25 January. The design team resorted to cutting V-shapes into the booms to give it an angle of 2°15' which would allow the aircraft to be trimmed nose-upwards to facilitate a takeoff. Further high-speed taxiing trials were made in February with promising results, but the elevator had to be enlarged from an area of 1.75 to 2.6 m^{2} (18.8 to 28.0 sq ft), extending it past the vertical stabilizers, before it could make its maiden flight on 1 April. After modifications to its spoiler, elevator and landing gear doors, the aircraft made its next flight on 21 April.

The Narval was exhibited in that year's Paris Air Show in May and resumed flight testing. On 24 May it reached a speed of 500 km/h (311 mph) at which time it began pitching oscillations and the controls became harder to move. The aircraft's airframe and engine were modified in August and the engine's crankshaft broke during a flight on 7 September. The Chauvière propeller proved to be a disappointment and plans were made to replace with a Rotol model although this was never implemented. During a speed run with the engine limited to 3,000 rpm on 3 November, the Narval only reached 560 km/h (348 mph) at 5,800 m (19,000 ft). A week later the aircraft was flown to the Air Force's flight-test center at Brétigny for the service evaluation. The report was damning, judging its performance and stability inadequate, which meant that it would not be a good gun platform. The test pilots noted that the Narval tended to go into a dive when engine power was reduced, something that would make carrier landings very difficult, and that it demonstrated poor flying characteristics whenever the flaps were retracted or extended.

The first prototype finally made its first flight on 9 December, the test pilot, Roger Carpentier, complaining that he had to struggle to keep the wings level in flight. During a flight on the second prototype on 16 December, Carpentier confirmed most of the official observations, commenting that he found it impossible to perform an aileron roll at a speed of 460 km/h (290 mph). Another pilot discovered that the first prototype behaved differently from the second one when the flaps were retracted, it banked to the right instead of diving. Flight testing ended on 7 January after the first prototype had only flown twice and the second one forty-four times for a total of 25 hours and 50 minutes of flight time. The aircraft were scrapped after the Narval program was cancelled in April. Contributing factors to the decision was the American delivery of Grumman F6F Hellcat and Vought F4U Corsair carrier fighters and that other French fighter projects used turbojets for power, which rendered the Narval fundamentally obsolete, despite a proposal by SNCASO in October 1948 to replace the Arsenal 12H with the British Rolls-Royce Nene turbojet as the SO.8010.

== Specifications ==
Data from X-Planes of Europe II: Military Prototype Aircraft from the Golden Age 1946–1974

General characteristics

- Crew: 1
- Length: 11.83 m (38 ft 10 in)
- Wingspan: 11.77 m (38 ft 7 in)
- Wing area: 26.3 m^{2} (283 sq ft)
- Gross weight: 7,261 kg (16,008 lb)
- Fuel capacity: 1,413-litre (311 imp gal; 373 US gal)
- Powerplant: 1 × Arsenal 12H-02 water-cooled V-12 piston engine, 1,680 kW (2,250 hp)
- Propellers: 8-bladed contra-rotating Chauviére, 2.7 m (8 ft 10 in) diameter

Performance

- Maximum speed: 730 km/h (450 mph, 390 kn) (estimated) at 8,500 m (27,900 ft)
- Ferry range: 4,500 km (2,800 mi, 2,400 nmi)
- Service ceiling: 10,000 m (33,000 ft)

Armament

- Guns: 6 × 20 mm (0.8 in) MG 151 autocannon
- Bombs: 1,000 kg (2,200 lb)

== Bibliography ==
- Buttler, Tony. X-Planes of Europe II: Military Prototype Aircraft from the Golden Age 1945–1974. Manchester, UK: Hikoki Publications, 2015. ISBN 978-1-90210-948-0
- Carbonel, Jean-Christophe. French Secret Projects 1: Post War Fighters. Manchester, UK: Crecy Publishing, 2016 ISBN 978-1-91080-900-6
- Pearce, William. "Sud-Ouest (SNCASO) SO.8000 Narval". oldmachinepress.com.
