= SNCASO =

French aircraft manufacturer

Société nationale des constructions aéronautiques du Sud-Ouest
- Industry: Aerospace, defence
- Predecessor: Blériot (Suresnes); Bloch (Villacoublay); Lioré et Olivier (Rochefort); 3 others
- Founded: 1936
- Defunct: 1957
- Fate: Merged to form Sud Aviation
- Successor: Sud Aviation
- Headquarters: France
- Products: Aircraft

SNCASO (abbreviated from Société nationale des constructions aéronautiques du Sud-Ouest [sɔsjete nɑsjɔnal de kɔ̃stʁyksjɔ̃ aeʁɔnotik dy syd wɛst]), or commonly Sud-Ouest, was a French aircraft manufacturer.

Created during 1936 as one of seven nationalised aeronautical manufacturing companies, SNCASO became a key French aircraft manufacturer following the end of the Second World War. It produced numerous innovation aircraft; amongst the company's more notable projects was the first French jet aircraft, the Sud-Ouest Triton, and the first indigenously-developed French helicopter, the Sud-Ouest Djinn.

On 1 March 1957, SNCASO merged with another French nationalised aviation company, SNCASE, (Société nationale des constructions aéronautiques du Sud-Est), to form Sud Aviation.

== History ==
Following the resolution of the 1936 general strike of French heavy industry, the government of Léon Blum introduced an act to nationalize the French war industry. The act provided for the creation of seven nationalised aeronautical manufacturing companies: six for aircraft (SNCASE, SNCASO, SNCAN, SNCAO, SNCAM, SNCAC), and one for aircraft engines (SNCM - Lorraine-Dietrich). In accordance with this agreement, SNCASO was formed on 16 November 1936 from the merger of the factories of Blériot of Suresnes, Bloch of Villacoublay and Courbevoie, SASO (Société Aéronautique du Sud-Ouest) of Bordeaux-Mérignac, UCA (Usine de Construction Aéronautique) of Bordeaux-Bègles, Société Aérienne Bordelaise (SAB) of Bordeaux-Bacalan and Lioré et Olivier of Rochefort. Additionally, SNCASO constructed a new factory in Déols during that same year.

The company's fortunes, along with that of the wider French nation, were heavily affected by the events of the Second World War, particularly the formation of the occupation of France by German forces. Despite the country's hardship during the conflict, SNCASO continued to operate. During 1941, the Paris design bureaus of both the nationalized and the private aircraft firms were relocated; according to aviation historian Gérard Hartmann, this measure was taken to avoid capture. That same year, SNCASO took over the assets of the ailing SNCAO. The company worked on various projects throughout the war, often under a heavy level of secrecy, including into the new field of jet propulsion. France, akin to the other Allied nations in the war, had benefitted from captured Germany high speed research; these factors combined gave a great impetus to undertaking advanced research projects.

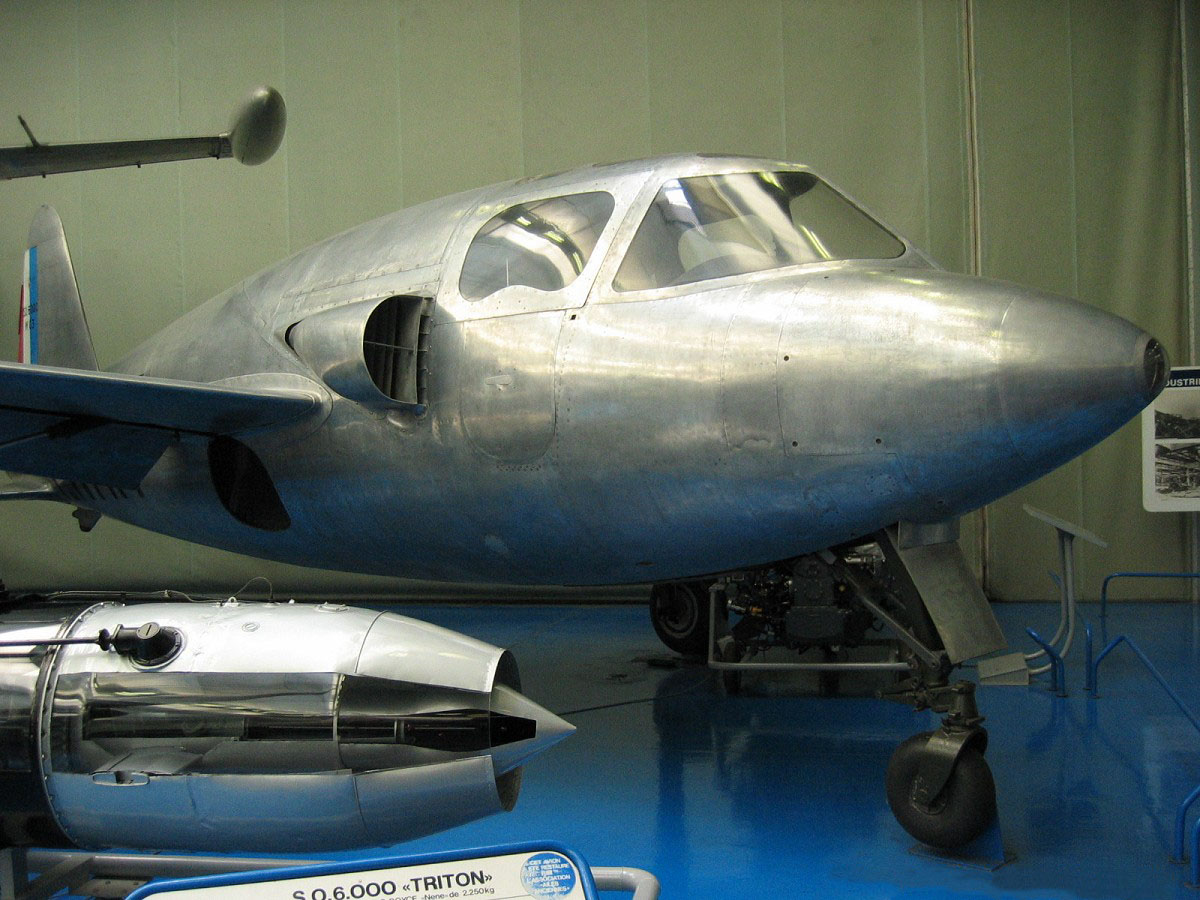
SO.6000 Triton n°3

Amongst the first new aviation projects to be launched in France during the postwar era was SNCASO's jet-powered Sud-Ouest Triton. According to aviation author John W.R. Taylor, the origins of the Triton can be traced back to a clandestine research effort conducted during 1943, headed by the French aeronautics engineer Lucien Servanty. Shortly after the end of the conflict, the new French government issued a requirement, calling for a total of five prototype aircraft to be constructed for testing purposes. The development of indigenously designed jet aircraft was seen as of national importance to the government, being intended to symbolise and embody the speedy recovery of France's industrial and military strength.

To speed up development of the Triton, which would become the first French jet-powered aircraft to fly, it was decided to use the German-designed Junkers Jumo 004-B2 engine after severe development issues were encountered with the indigenously developed Rateau-Anxionnaz GTS-65 turbojet engine. The British Rolls-Royce Nene turbojet engine was also adopted for multiple of the prototypes. On 11 November 1946, the first prototype Triton performed its maiden flight. However, further development of the Triton was ultimately abandoned during the early 1950s; it was never use in any operational circumstance. The design had been rendered obsolete by the rapid pace of advancements, both in terms of jet propulsion specifically and wider aerospace capabilities generally, with numerous jet-powered designs being produced around this timeframe.

SNCASO also branched out into helicopters. It gained useful experiences from the experimental Sud-Ouest Ariel, a tip jet helicopter, that enabled the firm's design team to pursue development of a practical light helicopter that would harness this technology. They designed a compact and lightweight twin-seat rotorcraft, which was promptly designated as the Sud-Ouest Djinn. While this newer design did not share an identical tip jet system to the Ariel, the type did rely upon the same basic concept of feeding compressed air, which was generated by an onboard pump, to the tips of the vehicle's rotor blades to drive the movement of the blades. First flying in January 1953, the Djinn proved itself to be a viable design; after several further prototypes were completed and tested, the type went into mass production. The Djinn was the first indigenously developed French helicopter, as well as being one of the first practical European helicopters to be produced. It was also the first tip-jet propelled rotorcraft to enter production.

Almost immediately after the war, the resurgent French Air Force also produced a requirement for a jet bomber with a takeoff weight of roughly 25–30 tonnes and capable of flying at high-subsonic speeds; its development was viewed as a major technological challenge as it called for the production of France's first jet bomber. SNCASO was amongst several French aircraft manufacturers to tender, submitting its SO.4000; it received a development order for a pair of manned scale models and a full-sized prototype. During 1947, as a result of the rapid advances made in aviation technologies made around this time, plans for the SO.4000's production run were abandoned; nevertheless, it was decided to complete the two scale models and the full size prototype for experimental purposes. Both scale models provided valuable data on features such as swept wings, pilot escape systems, spoiler control, and leading edge slats. On 5 March 1950, the SO.4000 was rolled out; by this point, it was already obsolete and lacking in capabilities compared to its contemporaries. Following an accident that damaged the airframe, work on the project was abandoned. According to Gunston and Gilchrist, the SO.4000 was a very heavy aircraft, which only compounded the weakness of possessing relatively little engine power, giving it an extremely poor thrust-to-weight ratio even when empty; they also criticised it as possessing "useless capabilities".

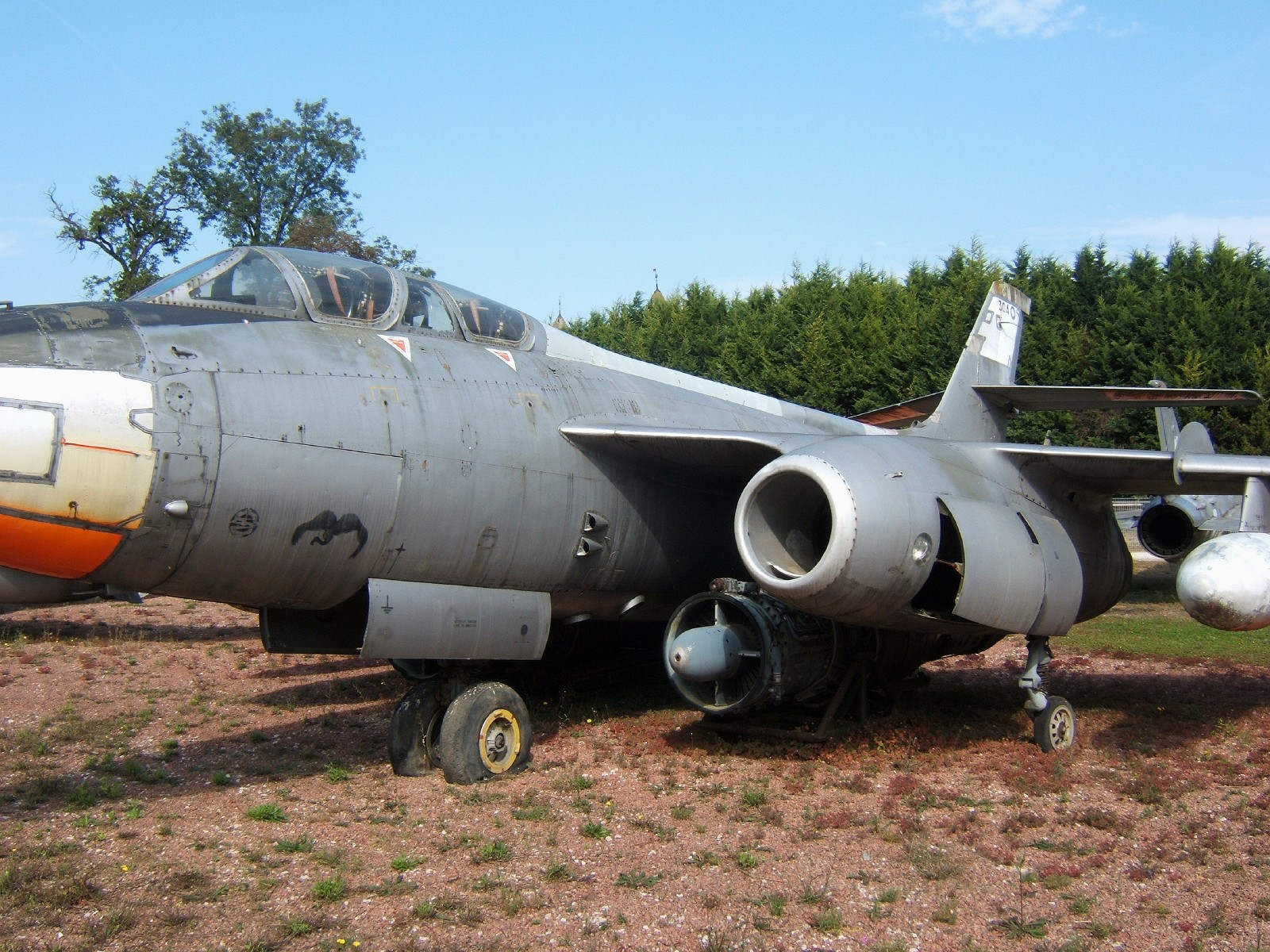
Vautour II N

During June 1951, the French Armée de l'Air (AdA) issued a separate requirement for a jet-powered aircraft capable of functioning as a bomber, a low-level attack aircraft, or an all-weather interceptor. In response, SNCASO adapted its existing S.O. 4000 design to perform the desired roles. During 1951, prototype testing had demonstrated promising performance for the type, which encouraged its further development. Named the Vautour, the IIB bomber variant was used to carry France's nuclear weapons in addition to a conventional arsenal; as such, for some years the Vautour was an important element of the nation's nuclear deterrent. According to aviation authors Bill Gunston and Peter Gilchrist, "It would be fair to claim that in the early 1950s the Vautour was the most promising twin-jet warplane in Western Europe".

SNCASO developed several variants of the Vautour for different purposes, including the interceptor role; several were proposed but ultimately unbuilt. During 1956, two years prior to the Vautour even entering squadron service, France issued a more demanding requirement for a supersonic replacement aircraft. The Vautour was viewed as a stop-gap measure for the nuclear deterrent role, as its performance in this role was typically thought to be limited at best, while this more capable follow-on aircraft was under development. While the newer bomber requirement would ultimately result in the selection, development and manufacture of the Dassault Mirage IV bomber; SNCASO chose to respond to the requirement, producing their own proposal of an envisioned Super Vautour. According to aviation author Bill Gunston, the unbuilt 'stretched' Super Vautour would have featured an increased combat radius of 1,700 miles as well as the ability to attain at least Mach 0.9.

During the rationalisation of the nationalised Aircraft Industry during the 1950s, SNCASO was merged with SNCASE to form Sud Aviation on 1 March 1957. Over the subsequent decades, Sud Aviation was in turn was amalgamated into French defense conglomerate Aérospatiale and eventually became a part of the multinational EADS group, today trading as the Airbus Group.

== Aircraft products ==
- SO.30 Bretagne
- SNCASO SO.60C - 1950s abandoned project for a twin-engine jet airliner
- SO.80 Biarritz
- SO.90 Corse
- SO.95 Corse II
- SO.177
- SO.1100 Ariel
- SO.1110 Ariel
- SO.1120 Ariel
- SO.1220 Djinn
- SO.1310 Farfardet
- SO.3050
- SO.4000
- SO.4050 Vautour
- SO.6000 Triton
- SO.6020 Espadon
- SO.7010 Pégase
- SO.7050 Deauville
- SO.7055 Deauville
- SO.7060 Deauville
- SO.8000 Narval
- SO.9000 Trident I
- SO.9050 Trident II
- SO.M-1
- SO.M-2
- SO.P-1 Ferblantine
