= Bremgarten Airport =

Coordinates: 47°54′13″N 007°37′05″E

Bremgarten Airport (ICAO code: EDTG) is a special-use airfield and former military airfield located in the municipalities of Hartheim-Bremgarten and Eschbach in the Breisgau region of Baden-Württemberg. It is used by the Immelmann Sports Flying Group and several companies in the aviation sector. The Breisgau inter-municipal business park was developed on the site of the former military base, and its operating company also maintains the airfield. In 2011, the airfield recorded approximately 45,000 aircraft movements.

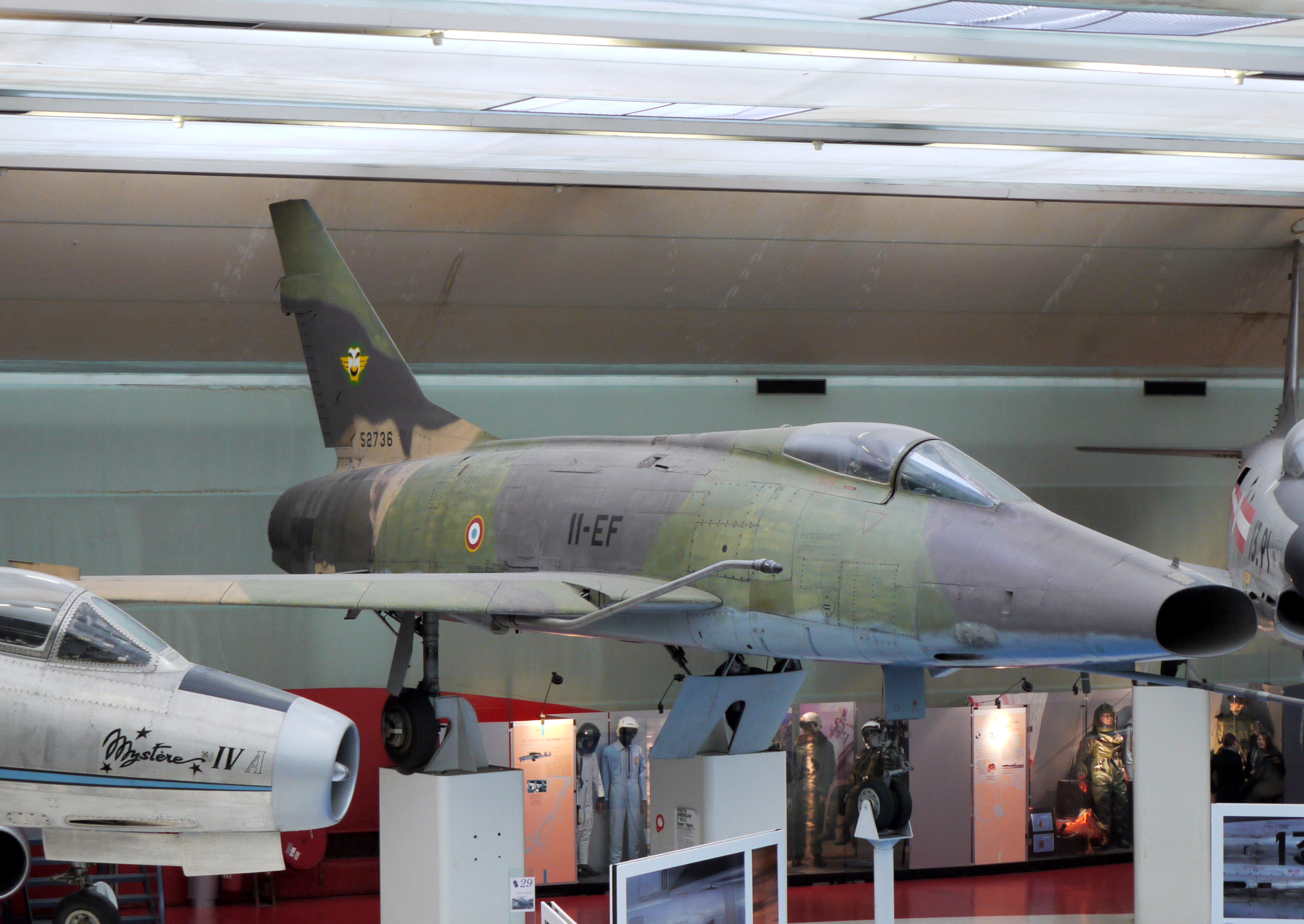
Bremgartener F-100 in Le Bourget

In 1950, NATO decided to build a base for the French Air Force southwest of Freiburg im Breisgau, in the immediate vicinity of the municipality of Bremgarten. Construction began in 1952. Further north in the Baden Rhine Plain, the Söllingen and Lahr military airfields were being built at the same time. The airfield was named after the then independent municipality of Bremgarten, as the construction management was located there. The buildings were mostly built on land belonging to the municipality of Eschbach, which became a garrison town. The infrastructure was completed by the beginning of 1954.

On March 31, the Base aérienne Tactique 136 (BAT.136) relocated from Friedrichshafen Airport to its new base near the Rhine border with France. It initially served as the base for the 4e demi-brigade de chasse, a fighter squadron equipped with the Dassault Ouragan. Later, it flew the Republic F-84 Thunderjet.

From 1968 the German Air Force reconnaissance wing Aufklärungsgeschwader 51 used the base.
