= Münzberg =

Münzberg is a German surname, derived from Münze (coin) and Berg (mountain). Notable people with the surname include:

- Gerd Münzberg (1902–1994), German lawyer and composer
- Hans-Georg Münzberg (1916–2000), German engineer and academic teacher
- Johann Münzberg (1799–1878), Bohemian textile manufacturer and entrepreneur
- Olav Münzberg (1938–2020), German writer and critic
- Wolfgang Münzberg (1928–2022), German lawyer and academic teacher
