= Dassault Super Mystère =

Fighter-bomber in France

Super Mystère
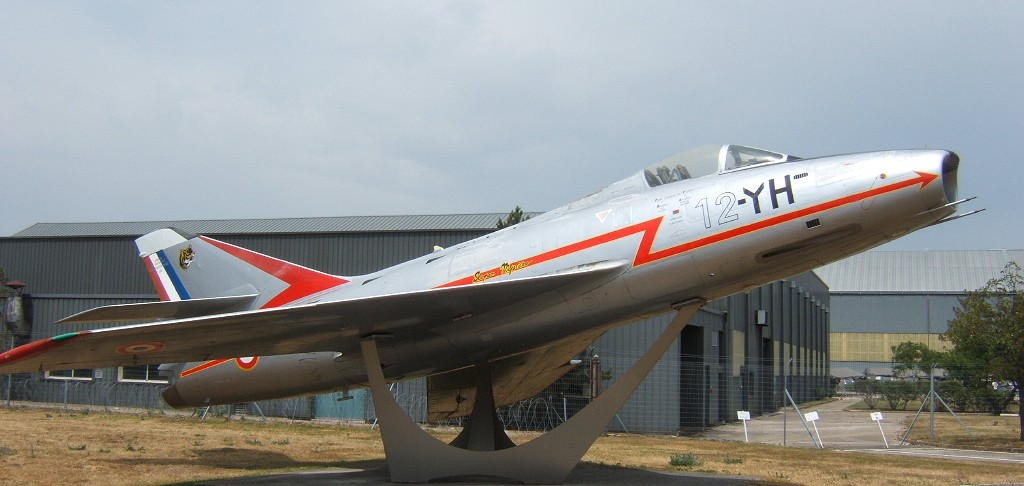

General information
- Type: Fighter-bomber
- National origin: France
- Manufacturer: Dassault Aviation
- Primary users: French Air Force Israeli Air Force; Honduras Air Force
- Number built: 178

History
- Manufactured: 1956–1959
- First flight: 2 March 1955
- Retired: 1977 (French Air Force)
- Developed from: Dassault Mystère IV

The Dassault Super Mystère is a French supersonic fighter-bomber and was the first Western European supersonic aircraft to enter mass production.

== Design and development ==
The Super Mystère represents the final step in evolution, which began with the Dassault Ouragan and progressed through the Mystère II/III and Mystère IV. While earlier Mystère variants could attain supersonic speeds only in a dive, the Super Mystère could exceed the speed of sound in level flight. This was achieved thanks to the new thin wing with 45° of sweep (compared with 41° of sweep in the Mystère IV and only 33° in Mystère II) and the use of an afterburner-equipped turbojet engine.

The first prototype Super Mystère B.1, powered by a Rolls-Royce Avon RA.7R, took to the air on 2 March 1955. The aircraft broke the sound barrier in level flight the following day.

As the Super Mystère B2, sometimes known as the SMB2, the aircraft entered production in 1957. The production version differed from the prototype by having a more powerful SNECMA Atar 101G engine. A total of 180 Super Mystère B2s were built.

In 1958, two Super Mystère B.4 prototypes were built. Equipped with a new 48° swept wing and a more powerful SNECMA Atar 9B engine, the aircraft were capable of Mach 1.4. Production never materialized because the faster Dassault Mirage III was entering service.

In 1973, the Israeli Air Force and Honduras Air Force upgraded their Super Mystère B2s with a non-afterburning version of the Pratt & Whitney J52-P8A, extended tailpipe, and new avionics. In Israeli service these upgraded SMB2s were also known as the IAI Sa'ar (after a Hebrew word meaning "storm").

== Operational history ==
=== France ===
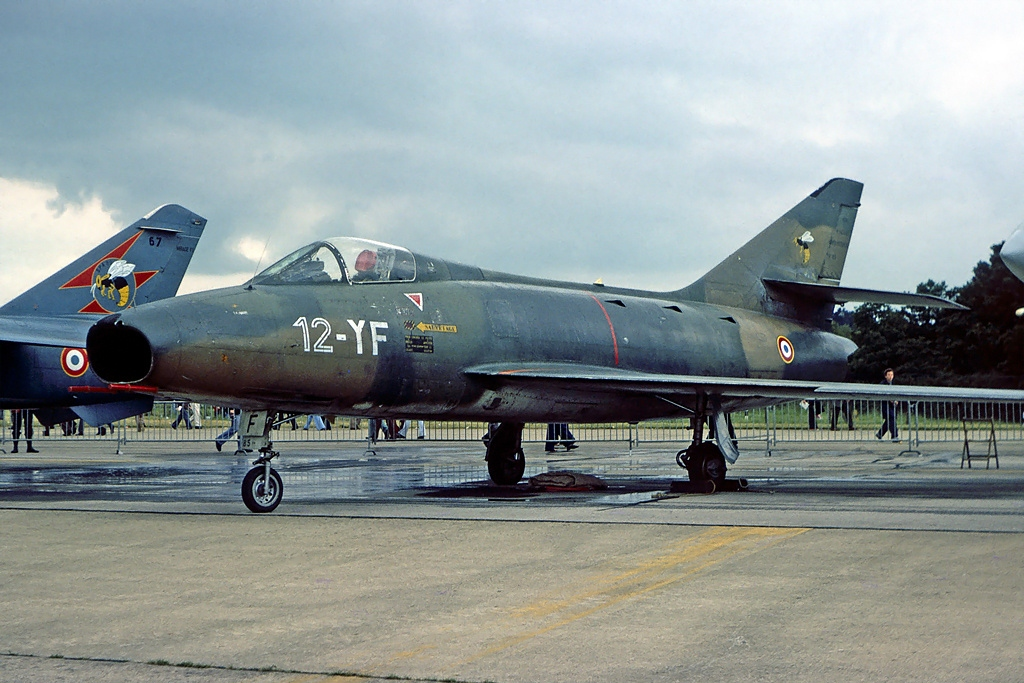
A French Super Mystère B2 in 1977

The SMB2 was assigned to three fighter wings (5th, 10th and 12th) starting in May 1958. In November 1977, the last SMB2 of the 1/12 Cambrésis fighter squadron made its last flight, thus closing 19 years of service with the Armée de l'Air. About fifteen aircraft from this squadron were then assigned to the Rochefort air technician school. Aircraft no.90 12-YQ was assigned to the Cité de l'Air Military Training Center, at 122 Chartres-Champhol Air Base.

=== Israel ===
The Israeli Air Force acquired 24 Super Mystères in 1958.

Israeli Super Mystères were involved in a controversial incident in which the USS Liberty was attacked. The aircraft saw action in the 1967 Six-Day War and the 1973 Yom Kippur War in which 6 were lost.

Super Mystères were well-liked by Israeli pilots, and were regarded as good match for the MiG-19 operated by opponents in air-to-air combat.

=== Honduras ===
In 1976, Honduras bought 12 complete Super Mystère airframes from Israel. In 1979, Honduras purchased four more aircraft.

These provided air support in numerous border skirmishes with Sandinistan Nicaragua, and served until in 1996, replaced by 12 Northrop F-5Es. One Super Mystère was transferred to the Honduras Air Museum, and the remaining 11 were offered for sale as surplus.

== Operators ==
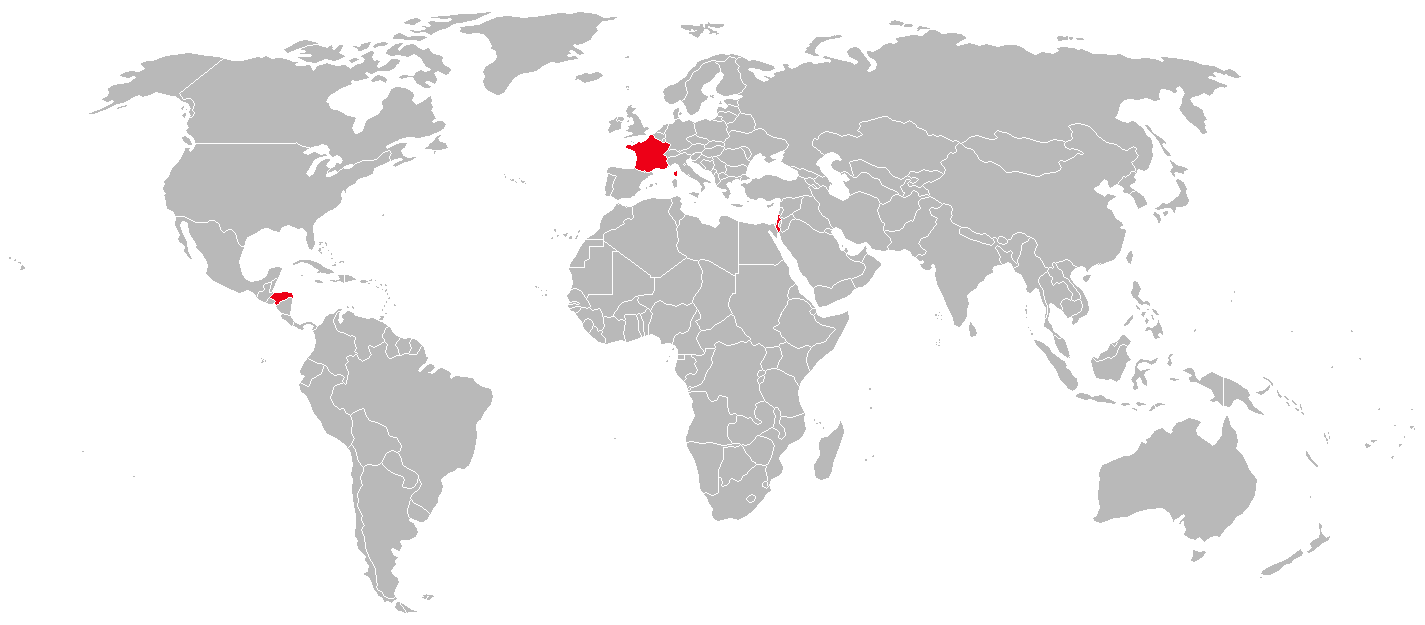
Former Super Mystère operators

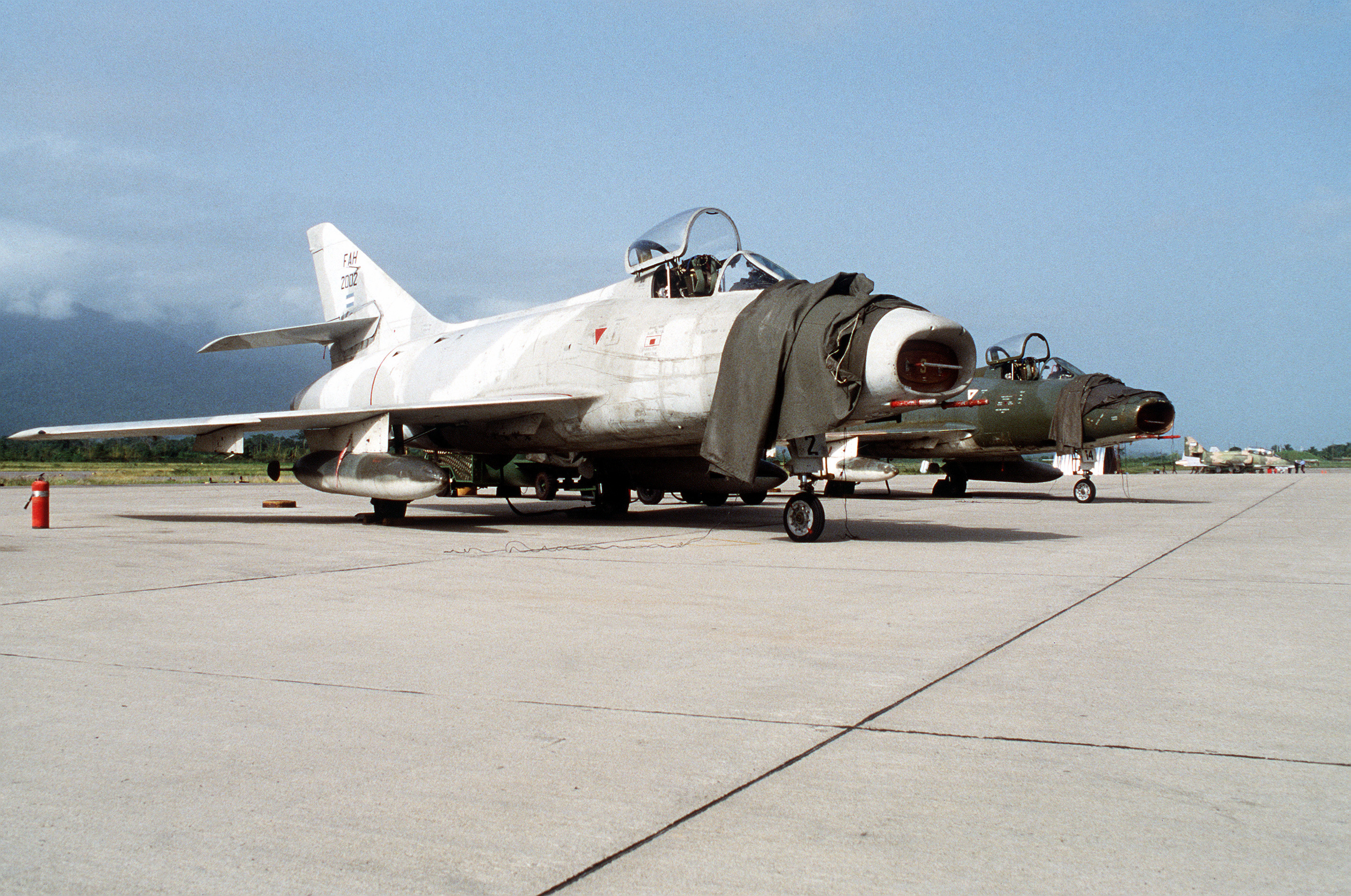
Two Super Mystère B2 aircraft of the Honduran Air Force (1988)

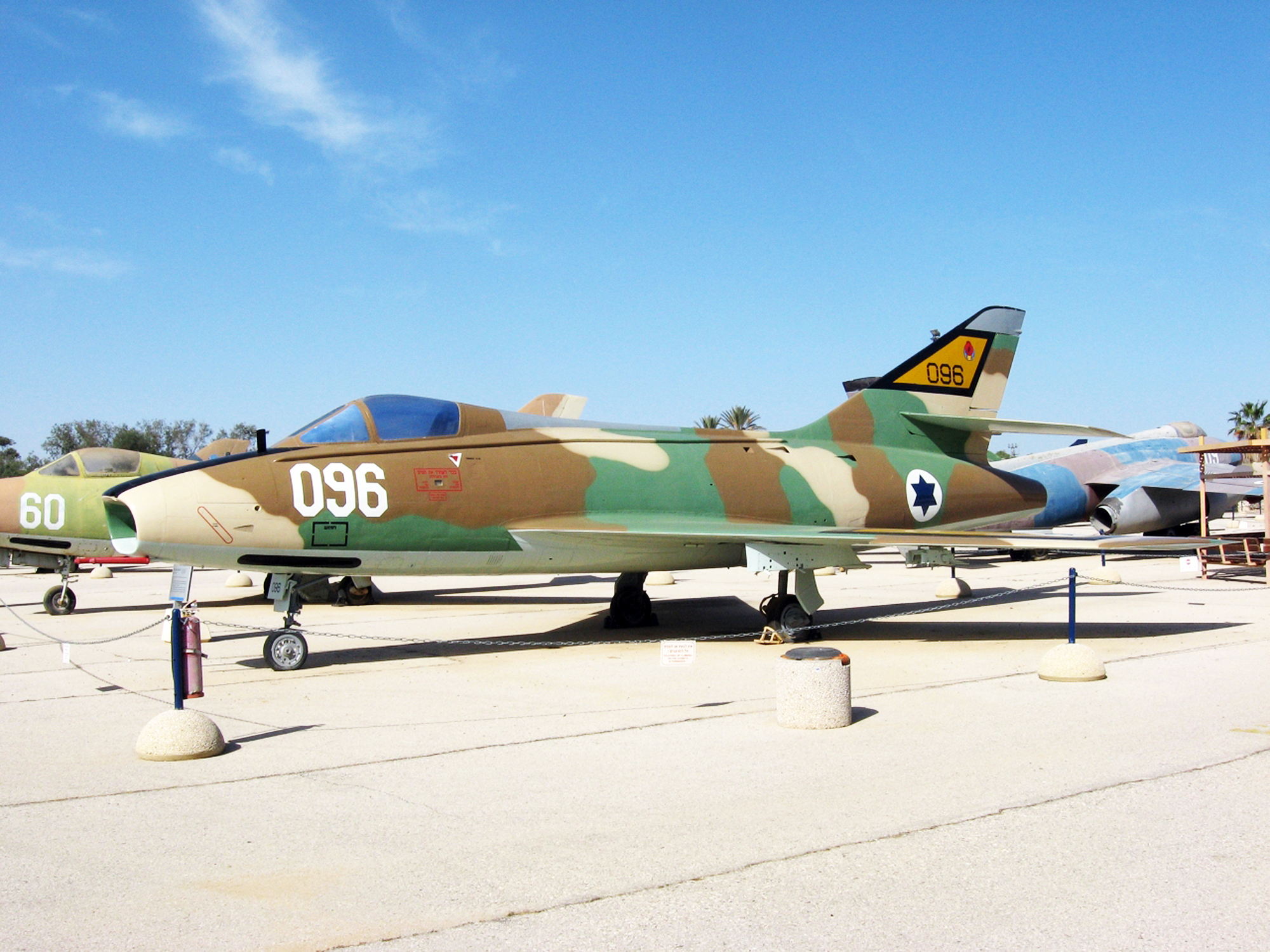
Super Mystère at the Israeli Air Force Museum in Hatzerim

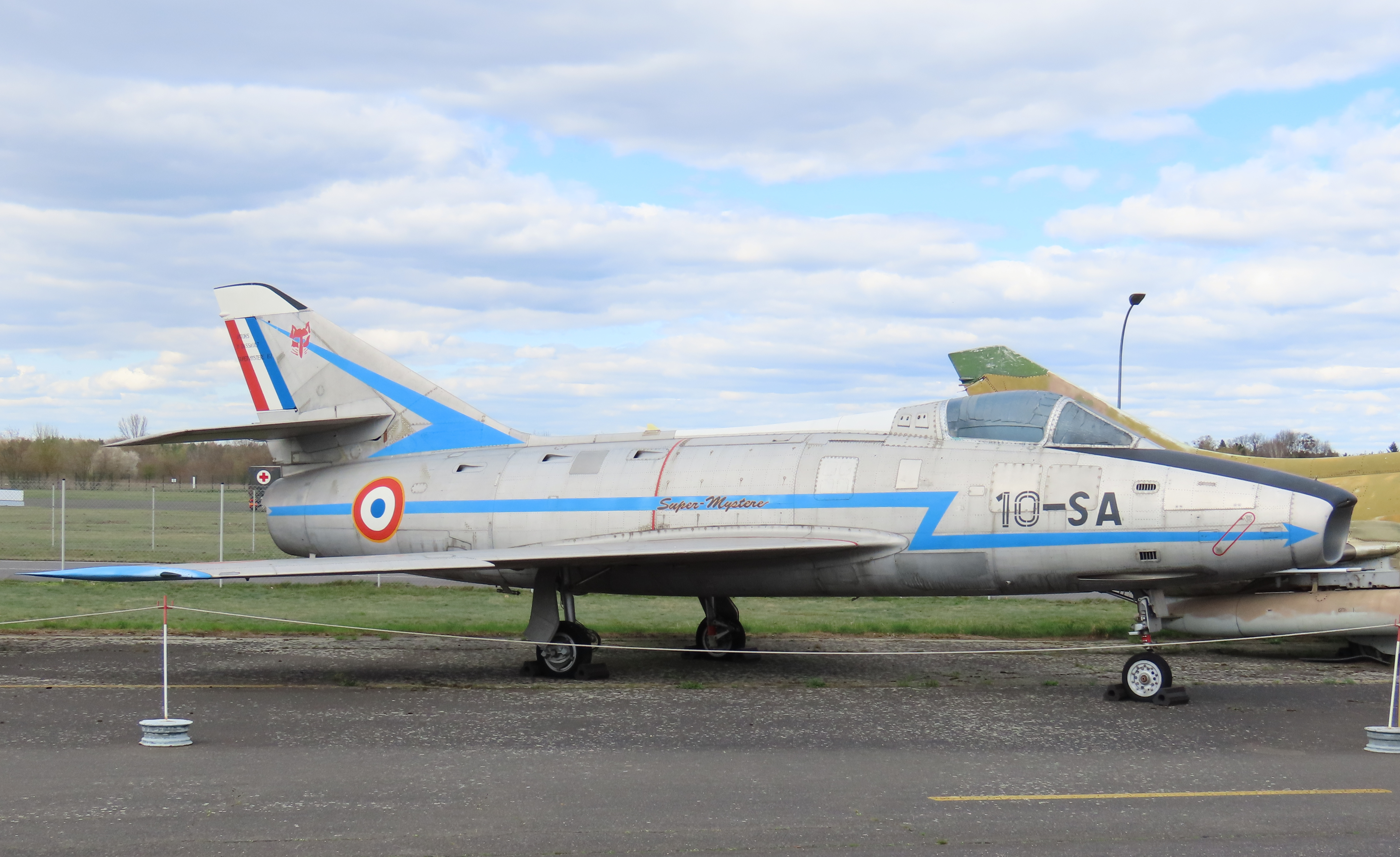
Super Mystère at the German Air Force Museum in Gatow

France

- French Air Force

Honduras

- Honduras Air Force

Israel

- Israeli Air Force
  - 105 Squadron

== Specifications (Super Mystère B2) ==
Data from

General characteristics

- Crew: 1
- Length: 14.13 m (46 ft 4 in)
- Wingspan: 10.51 m (34 ft 6 in)
- Height: 4.6 m (15 ft 1 in)
- Wing area: 32 m^{2} (340 sq ft)
- Empty weight: 6,930 kg (15,278 lb)
- Gross weight: 9,000 kg (19,842 lb)
- Max takeoff weight: 10,000 kg (22,046 lb)
- Fuel capacity: 2,000 kg (4,409 lb)
- Powerplant: 1 × SNECMA Atar 101G-2 afterburning turbojet engine, 33.3 kN (7,500 lbf) thrust dry, 44.1 kN (9,900 lbf) with afterburner

Performance

- Maximum speed: 1,195 km/h (743 mph, 645 kn) at 11,000 m (36,000 ft)
- Maximum speed: Mach 1.12
- Combat range: 870 km (540 mi, 470 nmi)
- Ferry range: 1,175 km (730 mi, 634 nmi)
- Service ceiling: 17,000 m (56,000 ft)
- Rate of climb: 89 m/s (17,500 ft/min)
- Wing loading: 281 kg/m^{2} (58 lb/sq ft)
- Thrust/weight: 0.5

Armament

- Guns: 2× 30 mm (1.18 in) DEFA 552 cannons with 150 rounds per gun
- Rockets: 2× Matra rocket pods with 18× SNEB 68 mm rockets each
- Missiles: 2× Rafael Shafrir AAMs
- Bombs: 2,680 kg (5,000 lb) of payload on four external hardpoints, including a variety of bombs, reconnaissance pods or Drop tanks

== See also ==
Related development

- Dassault Mystère IV
- Dassault Étendard II

Aircraft of comparable role, configuration, and era

- North American F-100 Super Sabre
- Mikoyan-Gurevich MiG-19

Related lists

- List of fighter aircraft
- List of military aircraft of France

== Bibliography ==
- Carbonel, Jean-Christophe (2016). French Secret Projects. Vol. 1: Post War Fighters. Manchester, UK: Crecy Publishing. ISBN 978-1-91080-900-6.
- Cuny, Jean (1980). Les chasseurs Dassault: Ouragans, Mysteres et Super-Mysteres. Docavia (in French). Vol. 13. Éditions Larivière.
- Donald, David; Lake, Jon, eds. (1996). Encyclopedia of world military aircraft. AIRtime Publishing. ISBN 1-880588-24-2.
- Kopenhagen, W, ed. (1987). Das große Flugzeug-Typenbuch [The large airplane type book] (in German). Transpress. ISBN 3-344-00162-0.
- Lefèbvre, Jean-Michel (December 1977). "Après 19 ans de service dans l'Armée de l'Air: Adieu au S.M.B.2" [After 19 Years of Service in the French Air Force: Farewell to the S.M.B.2]. Le Fana de l'Aviation (in French). No. 97. pp. 18–20. ISSN 0757-4169.
- Lefèbvre, Jean-Michel (January 1978). "Une "gueule aplatie" de grande classe... Dassault "Super Mystère" B.2 (2)" [A High-class "Flatmouth"... the Dassault Super Mystère B.2, Part Two]. Le Fana de l'Aviation (in French). No. 98. pp. 20–27. ISSN 0757-4169.
- Petit, Jean-Jacques (December 1977). "Le S.M.B.2 en service (1)" [The S.M.B.2 in Service, Part One]. Le Fana de l'Aviation (in French). No. 97. pp. 20–27. ISSN 0757-4169.
- Petit, Jean-Jacques (January 1978). "Le S.M.B.2 en service (2)" [The S.M.B.2 in Service, Part Two]. Le Fana de l'Aviation (in French). No. 98. p. 21–22. ISSN 0757-4169.
