= Meiderich =

Coordinates: 51°28′N 6°46′E

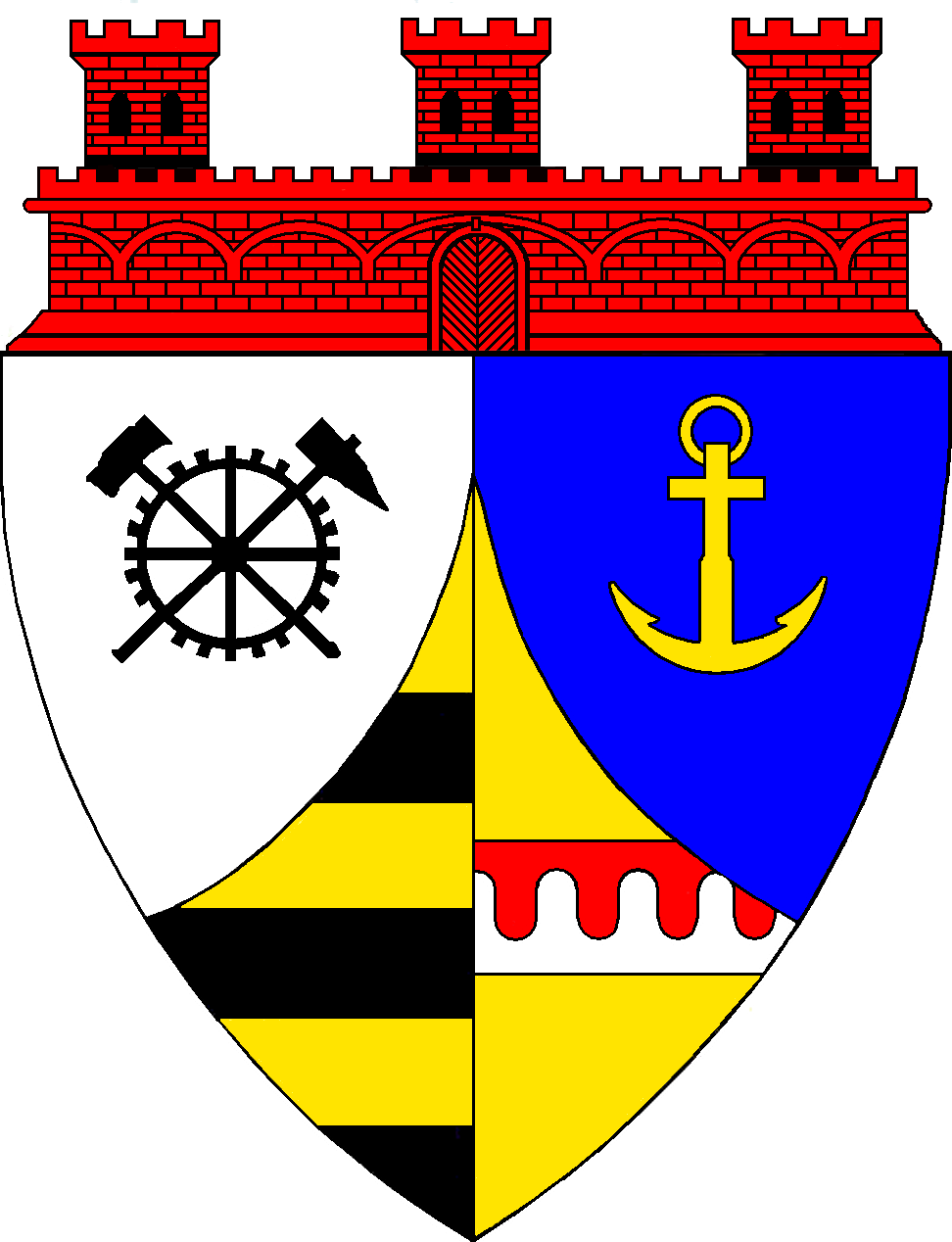
coat of arms of Meiderich

Meiderich (German pronunciation: [ˈmaɪdəʁɪç]) is a quarter of the city of Duisburg. It is divided into Unter-, Mittel- and Obermeiderich.

Meiderich belongs to the city district Meiderich/Beeck, which was established in 1975 during the course of municipal reorganization. On 31 December 2004, 75,000 people lived in the district. Meiderich/Beeck has seven quarters: Beeck, Beeckerwerth, Bruckhausen, Laar, Mittel-, Ober- and Untermeiderich.

Meiderich was first mentioned in the beginning of the 10th century as "Medriki", that means "moist area", in a document of the Werden Abbey. The first church was built in the 13th century. In the Middle Ages there was the village Meiderich surrounded by seven areas of accumulated farms: Berchum, Berg, Borkhofen, Dümpten, Lakum, Lösort and Vohwinkel. The association-football club MSV Duisburg, currently taking part in the German third division (3. Bundesliga / "Dritte Liga") has its roots in Meiderich; the club's name MSV is derived from "Meidericher Spielverein".

== Public transport ==
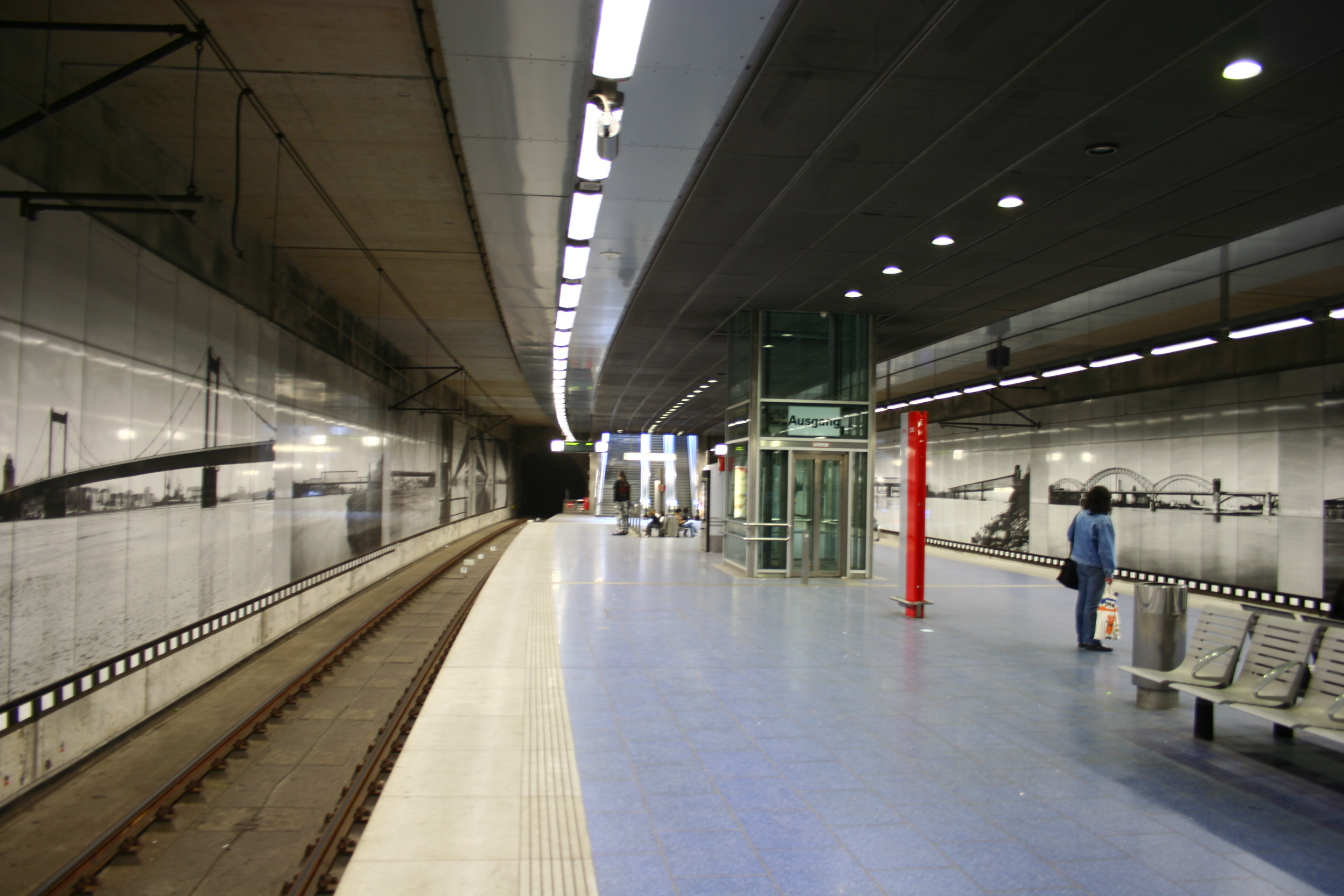
Stadtbahn Meiderich Bf. station in 2009

Meiderich Bf. is a terminus station of Verkehrsverbund Rhein-Ruhr (VRR) line U79, connecting Meiderich with Duisburg Hbf and Düsseldorf-Stadtmitte.

== Bibliography ==
- Heinrich Averdunk / Walter Ring: Geschichte der Stadt Duisburg. Essen: Baedeker Verlag, 1927, S. 304 - 330
- Peter Cinka: Berühmte Meidericher Persönlichkeiten aus den letzten beiden Jahrhunderten.Duisburg: Borath Verlag, 1997
- Günter von Roden: Geschichte der Stadt Duisburg. Bd. II: Die Ortsteile von den Anfängen. Die Gesamtstadt seit 1905. Duisburg: Walter Braun Verlag, 1974, p. 124 - 184
