= Snecma Atar =

Turbojet aircraft engine

Atar
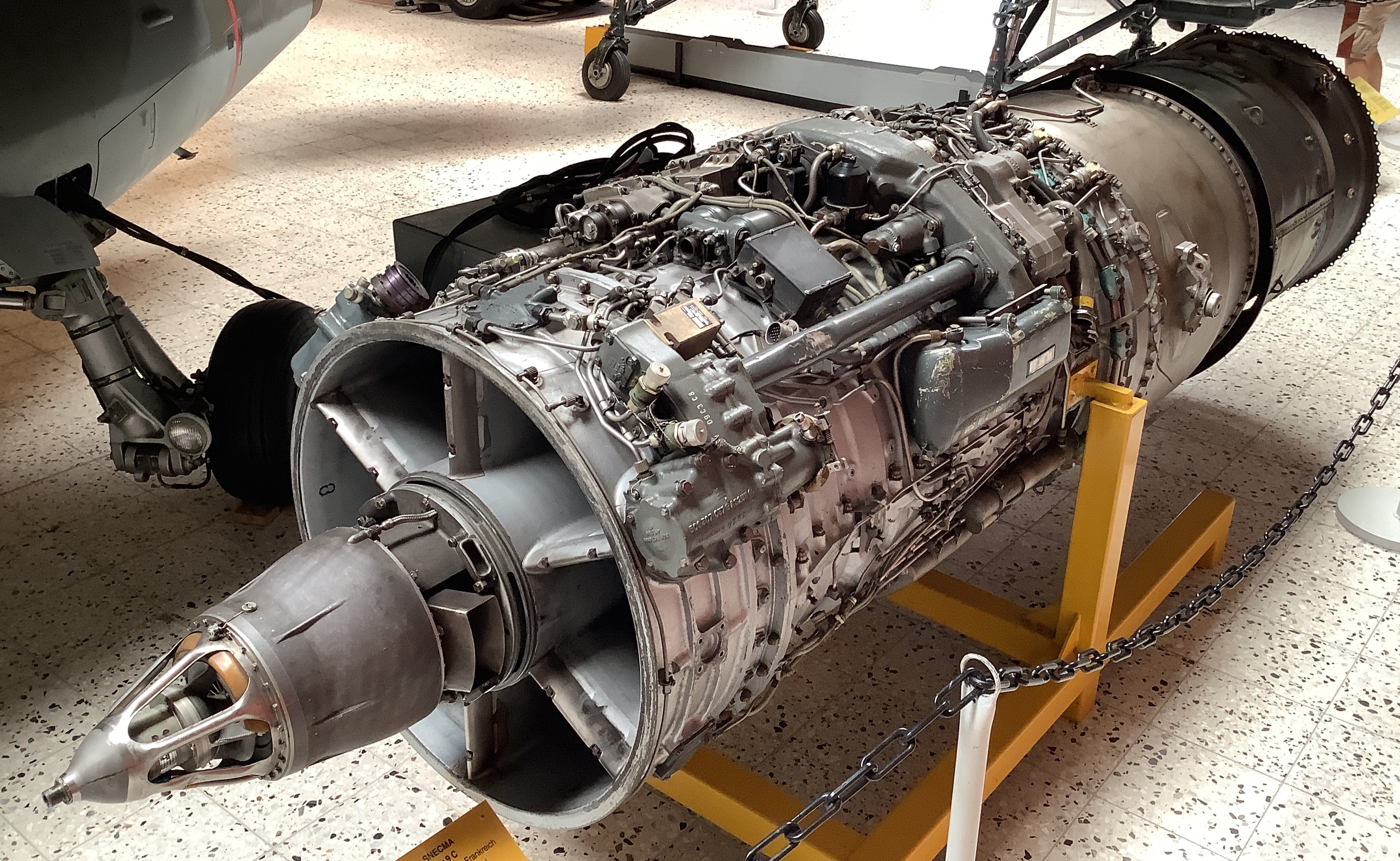
- Atar 9C on display at Flugausstellung Peter Junior
- Type: Turbojet
- National origin: France
- Manufacturer: Snecma
- First run: 26 March 1948
- Major applications: Dassault Super Étendard; Dassault Mirage III; Dassault Mirage F1; Dassault Mirage 5
- Developed from: SNECMA Atar 101

The Snecma Atar is a French axial-flow turbojet engine built by Snecma. It was derived from the German World War II BMW 018 design, and developed by ex-BMW engineers through a progression of more powerful models. The name is derived from its original design group, Atelier technique aéronautique de Rickenbach (Rickenbach Aeronautical Technical Workshop) near Lindau within the French Occupation Zone of Germany. The Atar powered many of the French post-war jet aircraft, including the Vautour, Étendard and Super Étendard, Super Mystère and several models of the Mirage.

== History ==
=== Background ===
Hermann Oestrich's team in charge of the development of the BMW 003 engine had moved to the town of Stassfurt, near Magdeburg, in February 1945. An underground production factory was being set up in a salt mine outside town by C.G. Rheinhardt in a desperate attempt to continue engine production in face of the now overwhelming Allied air campaign. This mine is well known historically as it was also being used for the storage of uranium compounds as part of the Nazi atomic bomb program.

The town of Stassfurt surrendered to US forces on 12 April 1945, and Oestrich hid much of the technical data in a local cemetery. The next day a ten-man team made up primarily of engineers from Pratt & Whitney arrived, and he handed the data over to them. Production restarted for US use while the war ground to a close, and the US forces cleared out the factory while they waited to turn the area over to the Soviets.

Oestrich had by this time moved to Munich for further interrogation, and from there to England at the request of British engine designer Roy Fedden. He had them work on the design of a turboprop engine for a proposed C-54 Skymaster-class four-engine transport. While working on this design, Oestrich was secretly approached by French DGER agents with an offer to take up further design of the 003 in France. The French forces had found a number of BMW 003 turbojet engines in their occupation zone after the war, and were interested in setting up a production line. These discussions had not progressed very far when Oestrich was allowed to return to Munich, only to be brought back to England in late August, then returned to Munich again where the US offered him and a hand-selected team jobs in the US, but without their families.

Oestrich instead accepted the French invitation, and by September had been set up at the former Dornier factories in Rickenbach in the French Zone, close to the northern border of Switzerland. Here they were soon joined by other former BMW engineers, as well as those from a number of other German firms, bringing the team to about 200 members. The group was named the Atelier Technique Aéronautique Rickenbach (Rickenbach Aeronautical Technical Workshop), or ATAR. They had re-engineered the 003 design as the ATAR 101 (model R.101) by October, and granted a production contract on the proviso that actual production would be carried out in France. In January a further five-year contract was offered to the entire team, including protected wages, provisions for their families, few travel restrictions, and the possibility of French citizenship. The contract was signed on 25 April 1946, and the drawings for the ATAR 101 were sent to SNECMA for production.

=== ATAR 101 ===
The first engine took some time to assemble. The first parts were available as early as May 1946, but a complete compressor or turbine was not ready until the middle of the next year. The first complete engine finally ran on 26 March 1948. By April 5 it had been brought up to 16,000 N (3,600 lb_{f}) thrust and was continually improved until it reached 21,600 N (4,900 lb_{f}) by October. During this time a new turbine made of solid high-temperature steels replaced the earlier air-cooled models, allowing for better aerodynamic shaping and an improved compression ratio. By January 1950 several additional engines had joined the program, bringing the total running time to over 1,000 hours, and a thrust of 26,490 N (5,960 lb_{f}), making it among the most powerful engines of the era. The BMW 003 that it was developed from provided only 7,800 N (1,800 lb_{f}), less than a third of the Atar.

The ATAR 101B introduced Nimonic turbine blades and more stator blades as well as a number of changes to fix minor problems seen in the earlier experimental models. The first B model passed a 150-hour endurance test in February 1951 at 23,500 N (5,300 lb_{f}). A flight test followed on 5 December 1951 in the Dassault Ouragan, and starting on 27 March 1952, under the wings of a Gloster Meteor F.4. After delivering the initial production run of B models, the Atar 101C used an improved compressor and combustion chamber, raising the thrust to 27,400 N (6,200 lb_{f}). The Atar 101D featured a slightly larger turbine with new high-temperature alloys that allowed the exit temperature to rise to 1,000 °C and the thrust to 29,420 N (6,610 lb_{f}). The D model also included a new exhaust consisting of a long pipe ending in a nozzle with two "eyelid" shutters in place of the earlier fore/aft moving cone on the inside, a feature of the WW II Junkers Jumo 004 axial-flow turbojet, which was known as the Zwiebel (onion) from its shape. The Atar 101E added a "zeroth" compressor stage, raising the overall pressure ratio to 4.8:1 and the thrust to 36,300 N (8,200 lb_{f}), surpassing the projected thrust of 34.3 kN (7,700 lbf) of the German BMW 018 turbojet still being developed in 1945. Various Atar 101 models were tested on a wide variety of aircraft.

An afterburner was incorporated into the D model to produce the Atar 101F of 37,300 N (8,400 lb_{f}), while the same addition to the E model produced the 46,110 N (10,370 lb_{f}) ATAR 101G. These were flight tested on the Dassault Mystère II in August 1954, but they did not see production on this aircraft. Their first success was on the Dassault Super Mystère which first flew under Rolls-Royce Avon power on 2 March 1955, followed by the 101G powered version on 15 May 1956. Production started in 1957 with a contract for 370 aircraft, but this was later cut back to 180 in light of the performance of the Dassault Mirage III which was then undergoing testing.

=== Atar 08 and 09 ===
With the Atar 101 now sitting at the low end of the power scale, in 1954 SNECMA started the design of a more radical upgrade, the Atar 08. Overall design and dimensions were similar to the 101, but the new engine included a nine-stage compressor in place of the earlier seven-stage one, and a smaller two-stage turbine to power it. There were many detail improvements as well, including the replacement of the original compressor rotor with a new one made of magnesium alloy. The first Atar 08 B-3 produced 42,000 N (9,400 lb_{f}) and had a slightly improved overall pressure ratio of 5.5:1.

A new and much improved afterburner was designed for the engine, resulting in the Atar 09. It was first tested in January 1957 at 54,900 N (12,300 lb_{f}), and was soon improved to 58,800 N (13,200 lb_{f}). A further improved afterburner with an eighteen-flap nozzle in place of the two eyelids of the earlier designs was introduced on the 09C model in December 1959. This version also featured a new starter from Microturbo. The Atar 9D replaced the exhaust and afterburner area with one made of titanium that allowed continual operation at Mach 2, up from the C's 1.4. Air cooling was re-introduced for the Atar 9K models, further improving overall performance, and especially fuel economy.

With the Atar 8 and 9 series, the long ten years of development had finally resulted in a successful commercial design. Thousands were produced for a variety of aircraft, including the Étendard and Super Étendard strike aircraft, Mirage III, Mirage 5 and Mirage F1 fighters, the Mirage IV bomber, and a variety of test aircraft.

=== Super Atar ===
In 1955 the French government started a project to explore flight speeds up to Mach 3.0. SNECMA began studies on an engine to power it, initially consisting of the compressor design of the existing Atar 101, but replacing all of the light alloys with steels in order to handle the increased operating temperatures. This also demanded the use of an air-cooled turbine, similar to the ones from the earliest prototypes. Such an engine, the M.26, ran in May 1957, giving 47 kN (10,364 lbf) without an afterburner. Further improvements led to the M.28, which ran in September 1958 at 52 kN (11,466 lbf).

This work led to the Super Atar design of 85 kN with afterburning. This version also included variable stators, which were in the process of being widely introduced in the industry. However, the project to build the test aircraft, the Griffon III, never went ahead and SNECMA ended development of the Super Atar in 1960.

=== Other developments ===
The Atar design was also used for a variety of larger, smaller, and experimental developments. Of particular note are the R.104 Vulcain, a scaled-up Atar, and the much smaller R.105 Vesta. Both engines were developed in parallel to the Atar in the early 1950s in order to fill particular performance niches, the Vulcain for the Mystère IV D, and the Vesta for a variety of designs. None of these entered production, however; the Mystère IV D was cancelled, and the Vesta lost out to the Turboméca Gabizo, which was also abandoned.

== Description ==
The original Atar 101 featured a seven-stage axial compressor using aluminum alloy blades attached to an aluminum rotor. The front bearing was held in place by four vanes, with the "left" one as seen from the front containing a power takeoff shaft. One unique feature of the Atar designs was the separate Atar 5000 accessories section, which could be mounted in front of the engine, driven by an extension shaft. The combustion area consisted of twenty steel flame cans arranged in a "canular" layout, exiting into the single-stage turbine. Early models were 2.85 m long, 0.9 m in diameter, and weighed 850 kg, while The C models and on were 3.68 m long including the long extension, 0.89 m in diameter, and weighed 940 kg. Later versions were generally similar to the C model, although the inclusion of the afterburner increased length to 5.23 m, and weights varied from 925 to 1,240 kg depending on the model.

The Atar 8 and 9 used a 9-stage compressor similar to the 101, but including a steel first stage in order to improve resistance to foreign object damage. The turbine included two stages. Length and width remained the same as the 101 models, deliberately, but weights further increased up to 1,350 kg for the 9B.

== Variants ==
Atar 101B
Atar 101C
Atar 101D
Atar 101E
Atar 101F
Atar 101G

Used in Dassault Super Mystère fighter-bomber
Atar 08
Two-stage turbine and improved compressor, non-afterburning, developed in 1954–1956.

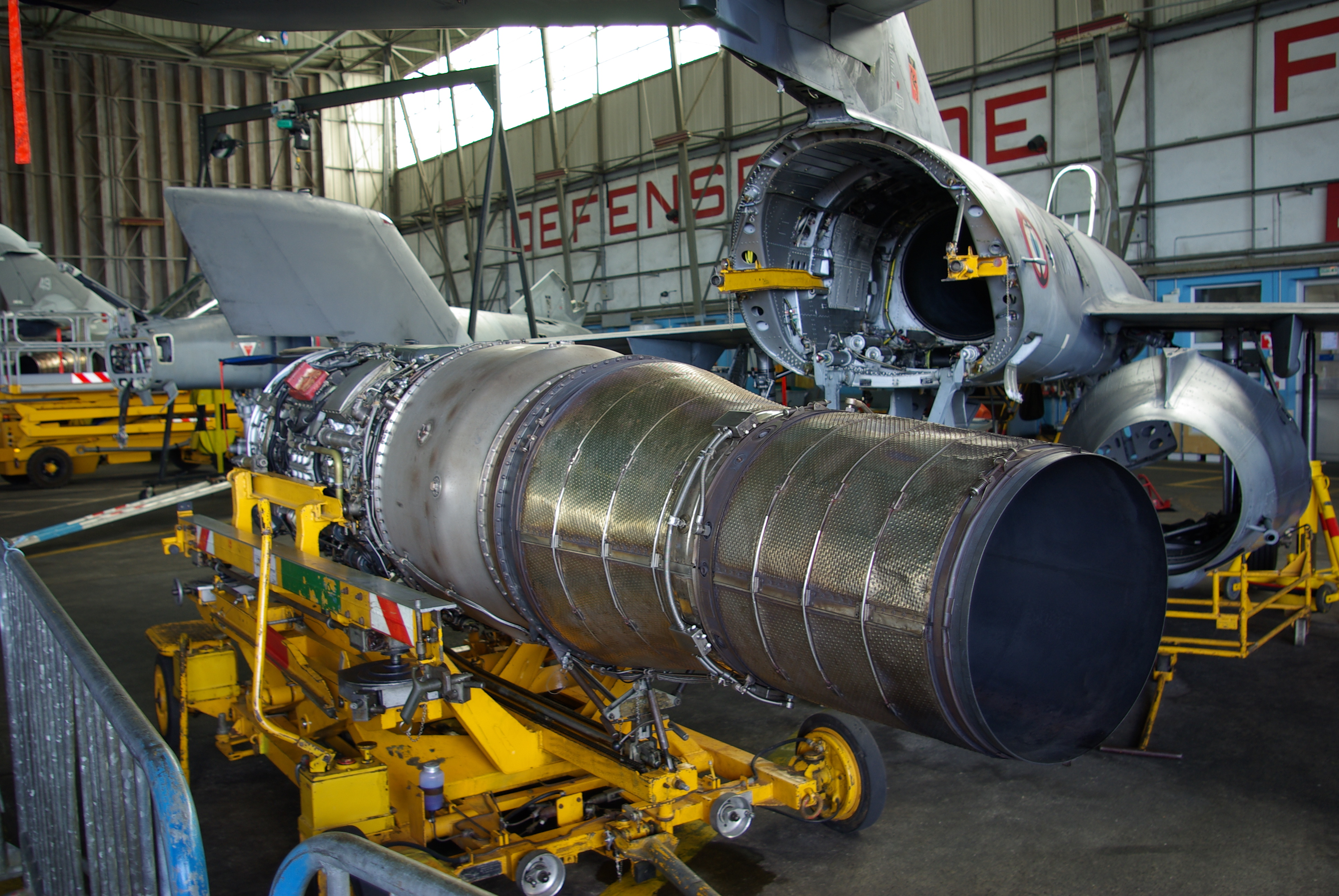
An Atar 8K50 removed from a Super Etendard, NAS Landivisiau, France

Atar 08B
Used in Dassault Étendard IV
Atar 08C
Atar 08K-50
Simplified non-afterburning version of Atar 9K-50 for Dassault Super Étendard
Atar 09
Integrated starter, improved compressor optimized for supersonic flight, afterburner.
Atar 09B
Atar 09B3
Atar 09C
Used in Dassault Mirage III and 5 fighters
Atar 09C3
Atar 09C5
Atar09K-10
Improved combustion chamber, turbine blade cooling; used in Dassault Mirage IV bombers
Atar09K-50
Modified Atar 9C with a redesigned turbine and upgraded compressor resulting in improved fuel consumption and thrust; used in Dassault Mirage F1, Mirage 50 and Atlas Cheetah.
Atar Plus
South African variant of the Atar09K-50 with new compressor, new turbine, new electronics.

== Applications ==
- Atlas Cheetah
- Dassault Étendard IV
- Dassault Mirage III
- Dassault Mirage IV
- Dassault Mirage 5/50
- Dassault Mirage F1
- Dassault Mirage G8
- Dassault Mystère IIC
- Dassault Super Étendard
- Dassault Super Mystère
- IAI Nesher/Finger
- Leduc 022
- Nord Gerfaut
- Nord 1500 Griffon
- SNCASE SE.212 Durandal
- Sud Aviation Vautour II
- Sud-Est Baroudeur

== Specifications (Atar 9C) ==
==== General characteristics ====
- Type: Afterburning turbojet
- Length: 5,900 mm (232 in)
- Diameter: 1,000 mm (39 in)
- Dry weight: 1,456 kg (3,210 lb)

==== Components ====
- Compressor: 9-stage axial compressor
- Combustors: annular
- Turbine: Two-stage

==== Performance ====
- Maximum thrust:
- 42.0 kN (9,440 lbf) military power
- 58.9 kN (13,240 lbf) with afterburner
- Overall pressure ratio: 5.2:1
- Air mass flow: 68 kg/s (150 lb/s)
- Specific fuel consumption:
- 103 kg/(kN·h) 28.6g/(kN⋅s) (1.01 lb/(lbf·h)) military power
- 207 kg/(kN·h) 57.5 g/(kN⋅s) (2.03 lb/(lbf·h)) with afterburner
- Thrust-to-weight ratio: 2.94; 4.13 with afterburner.

== See also ==
Related development

- BMW 003
- SNECMA Atar 101

Comparable engines

- Armstrong Siddeley Sapphire
- General Electric J73
- Rolls-Royce Avon
- Tumansky R-13
- Tumansky R-25

Related lists

- List of aircraft engines
