= Hermann Oestrich =

German-French engineer

- Born: 30 December 1903; Duisburg-Beeckerwerth
- Died: 2 April 1973 (aged 69); Paris, France
- Education: Technische Hochschule Hannover; Technische Hochschule Berlin
- Occupation: Engineer
- Organizations: BMW; Snecma
- Awards: Knight of the Legion of Honor

Hermann Oestrich (30 December 1903 – 2 April 1973) was a German-French engineer. He was involved in the development of jet engines as an employee of BMW and later of Snecma.

== Life ==
Born in Duisburg-Beeckerwerth, Oestrich studied at the Technische Hochschule Hannover and in Berlin. After completing his studies, he first went to the Deutsche Versuchsanstalt für Luftfahrt in 1926, where he remained until he moved to Brandenburgische Motorenwerke in 1935. He became chief engineer of BMW after earning a doctorate at the TH Berlin-Charlottenburg in Berlin in 1937. As part of the new development of jet engines, Oestrich began research in this field. In 1939 he was appointed head of the development of jet engines in the BMW plant in Berlin-Spandau. His developments eventually led to the BMW 003 engine, which was bought in 1946 by the French Air Ministry. In 1943, Oestrich was appointed department director and took over managing gas turbine development.

After the Second World War, Oestrich was captured and interrogated for a long time on technical issues. Finally, he was offered a job in the US, which he declined. Together with other former BMW employees, such as Hans-Georg Münzberg, August Wilhelm Quick and Otto David, he accepted a five-year contract with the French Ministry of Aviation. He founded Atar (Atelier technique aéronautique de Rickenbach) in 1946 and headed this development group of 120 employees. He went to Decize in 1946, where he worked for Snecma subsidiary Aeroplanes Voisin. Oestrich and his team worked on the further development of the Atar 101. In 1948 he acquired French citizenship and in 1950 he rose to technical director of Snecma in Villaroche, where the developments of the BMW 003 engine were being monitored. He retired from Snecma in 1960.

For his services at Snecma overseeing the development of Snecma Atar turbojet engines, he was awarded Knight of the Legion of Honor in 1962.
