= SNECMA Atar 101 =

1940s French turbojet aircraft engine

ATAR 101
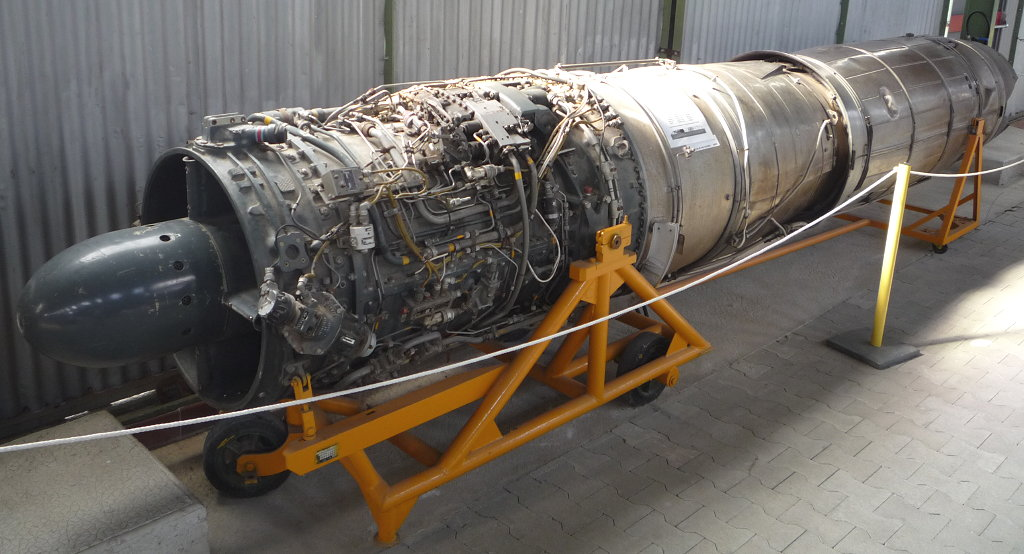
- An ATAR 101G3 from a Super Mystère B2 on display.
- Type: Turbojet engine
- National origin: France
- Manufacturer: SNECMA
- Designer: Hermann Östrich
- First run: 26 March 1948
- Major applications: SNCASO S.O.4050 Vautour
- Variants: SNECMA Atar

The SNECMA ATAR 101 is a French axial-flow turbojet engine built by SNECMA. It was derived from engines and design work carried out at BMW in Germany during World War II, and extensively developed though a progression of more powerful models. The name is derived from its original design group, Atelier Technique Aéronautique de Rickenbach employing Hermann Östrich and many of the wartime BMW gas turbine design group as well as other German engine design teams. The ATAR 101 powered many of the French post-war jet aircraft, including the Vautour II, Étendard IV, Super Mystère B2, and the Mirage III-001, prototype of the Mirage III series.

== Design and development ==
At the end of World War II the French aircraft industry was in disarray, having been commandeered by the German government to produce mostly German designed aircraft and aero-engines. To develop an indigenous gas turbine aero-engine the French government acquired the services of a large contingent of German design engineers and technicians. Some of these engineers formed the Atelier Technique Aéronautique de Rickenbach, led by Dr. Hermann Östrich who had been developing gas turbine engines at BMW. By September the team was housed at the Dornier factory at Rickenbach near Lindau on Lake Constance and had largely completed design of the ATAR 101 by October 1945. A contract for development of the engine was awarded in December 1945, a stipulation being that all manufacturing was to be carried out in France.

Communications between the ATAR group and SNECMA, the newly formed nationalised engine manufacturer, proved to be difficult and the design team soon moved to Decize on the river Loire, to improve communications with SNECMA and was renamed Aeroplanes G.Voisin, Groupe 'O' . Manufacture of components for the ATAR 101 V1 commenced at SNECMA plants in May 1946 and the first run was carried out on 26 March 1948.

The early engines were constructed from ordinary commercial steels and suffered from very short running lives, not achieving a 150-hour endurance test until 1951. As more exotic materials were introduced the durability and reliability of test engines improved dramatically and on 10 November 1950 the first flight-ready ATAR 101A flew in the fuselage of a Martin B-26G Marauder (F-WBXM). Steady progress was made by Groupe O, but they were soon absorbed into SNECMA during a massive re-organisation of the nationalised company in June 1950. Other aircraft joined the flight test program, including two SNCASE S.E.161 Languedoc airliners, a SNCASO S.O.30P Bretagne (F-WAYD), SNCASE S.E.2060 Armagnac and a Gloster Meteor F.4 (RA491).

The ATAR 101 was steadily developed with improvements to materials, aerodynamic design, compressors, combustion chambers and turbines resulting in the first commercially viable engine, the ATAR 101B, which, along with later marques, powered the SNCASO S.O.4050 Vautour interceptor/bomber/reconnaissance aircraft. Improved models continued to be developed throughout the 1950s culminating in the 101G with after-burning, which laid the ground work for the later ATAR 8 and ATAR 9.

== Variants ==
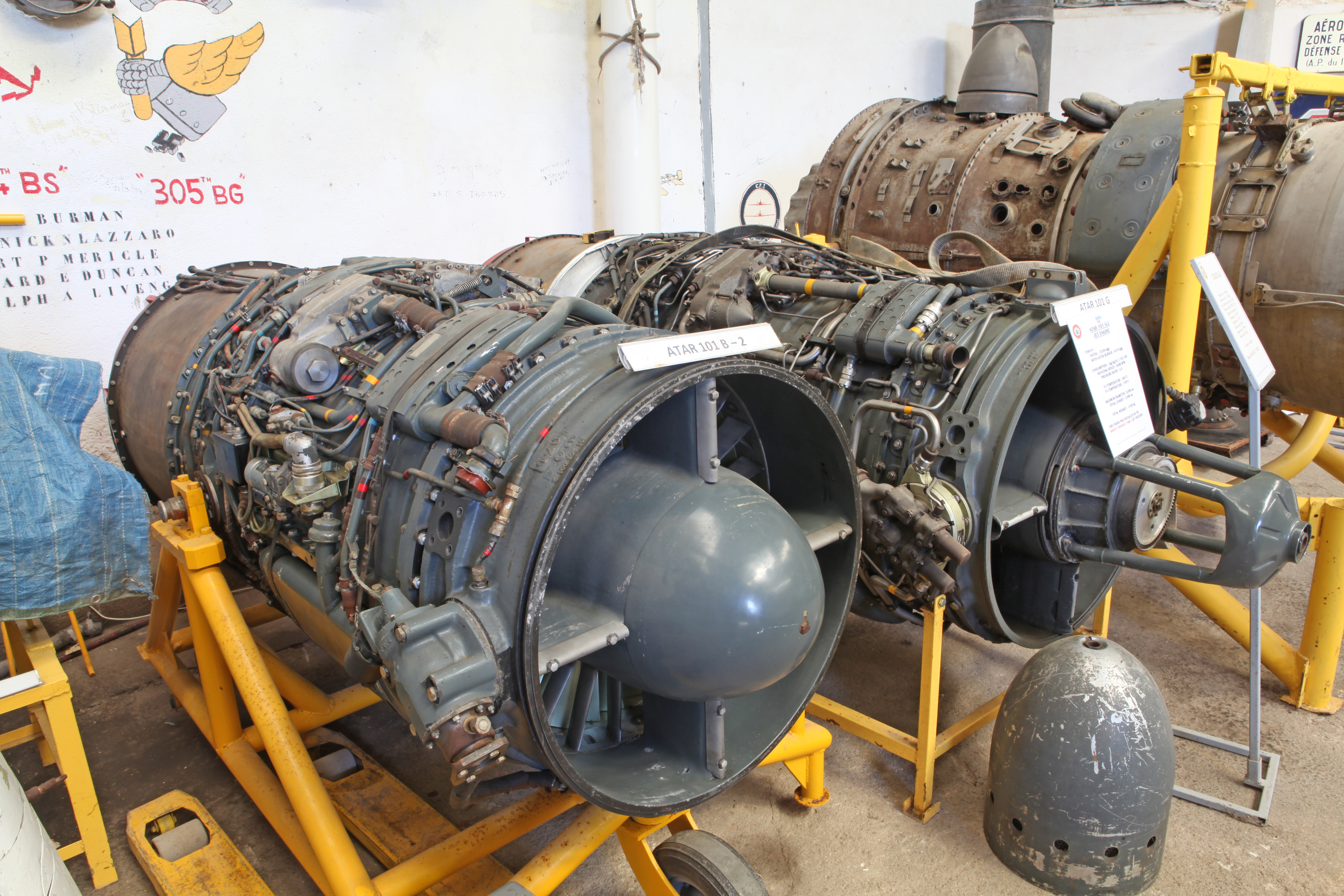
An ATAR 101B and ATAR 101G at Ailes Anciennes Armorique, Vannes-Meucon Airport

Data from: Turbojet: History and Development 1930–1960: Volume 2:

101V
Early test engines used to develop the engine.
101A
Flight test engines flown on flying test-beds.
101B
Initial production engine built in limited numbers for prototypes and test installations on contemporary aircraft. First flown in a Dassault MD.450-11/12 Ouragan on 5 December 1951, 101Bs also flew in a Gloster Meteor F.4 and the S.O.4050-01, first prototype of the Vautour.
101C
Improved compressor and combustion as well as an increase in maximum rpm from 8,050 to 8,400 rpm gave a thrust of 27.45 kN (6,170 lbf)
101D
The D introduced a variable area eyelid nozzle, replacing the translating bullet used in earlier Marks.

101D3

101E
By 1954 the 101E3 was developing 34.32 kN (7,715 lbf) largely due to a new compressor with 15% higher pressure ratio.

101E3
101E4
101E5

101F
The 101D fitted with an afterburner to produce the 101F
101G
The 101E fitted with an afterburner to produce the 101G

101G2
101G3
101G4

== Applications ==
- Martin B-26 Marauder (engine development)
- SNCASE S.E.161 Languedoc
- SNCASE S.E.2060 Armagnac
- Dassault MD.450-11/12 Ouragan
- Gloster Meteor F.4 (engine development)
- Dassault Mystère B prototypes and Mystere C production aircraft
- Dassault Mystère IVB prototype only
- Dassault Étendard IV prototype of the Étendard IV series
- Dassault Super Mystère B2
- Dassault Mirage III prototype
- SFECMAS Gerfaut
- Nord Griffon
- SNCASE S.E.212 Durandal
- SNCASE S.E.5000 Baroudeur
- Leduc 0.22

== Specifications (101C) ==
Data from Turbojet: History and Development 1930–1960: Volume 2:

==== General characteristics ====
- Type: Turbojet
- Length: 3,680 mm (145 in)
- Diameter: 890 mm (35 in)
- Dry weight: 940 kg (2,072 lb)

==== Components ====
- Compressor: 7-stage Axial flow
- Combustors: Annular
- Turbine: Single stage Axial
- Fuel type: Aviation kerosene
- Oil system: Pressure spray / splash system

==== Performance ====
- Maximum thrust: 2,800 kgf (27.46 kN; 6,172.94 lbf)
- Specific fuel consumption: 1.05 (107.03 kg/kN/hr)
- Thrust-to-weight ratio: 2.98

== See also ==
Related development

- Snecma Atar

Related lists

- List of aircraft engines
