= Hans-Georg Münzberg =

German engineer (1916–2000)

- Hans-Georg Münzberg, in the 1970s
- Born: 21 August 1916; Tetschen, Bohemia
- Died: 7 November 2000 (aged 84); Munich, Bavaria, Germany
- Occupations: Engineer; Academic
- Organizations: TU Berlin; TH Munich
- Awards: Médaille de l'Aéronautique

Hans-Georg Münzberg (21 August 1916 – 7 November 2000) was a German engineer who specialized in airplane turbines and space flight. He taught at the TU Berlin, the TH Munich, and wrote textbooks.

== Life ==
Münzberg was born in Tetschen (now Děčín), the son of the industrialist Rudolf Münzberg. He studied mechanical engineering at the Deutsche Technische Hochschule in Prague from 1934, graduating with the diploma in 1939. He then worked for the BMW-Flugmotorenwerke in Berlin-Spandau, focused on air foil turbines (Fluggasturbinen). He earned his Ph.D. in June 1942 with a dissertation on "Das Gasturbinentriebwerk als Antriebsaggregat für Hochgeschwindigkeitsflugzeuge" (The gas turbine engine as a power unit for high-speed aircraft).

After World War II, he worked in a French group of scientists including Hermann Oestrich at the "Atelier Aéronautique in Rickenbach" near Lindau which developed the Snecma Atar system of propulsion, which was moved to France. In 1957, he was appointed professor at the TU Berlin, the chair of Luftfahrtriebwerke. He continued his work in France, where he became director of research and development for Snecma in 1963.

In 1964, giving up his position at Snecma and professorship in Berlin, Münzberg was appointed professor at the TH Munich, where he founded the chair and institute of flight propulsion (Flugantriebe). He wrote several books on his topics, and retired in 1982.

Münzberg was elected a member of the Sudetendeutsche Akademie der Wissenschaften und Künste in 1981. He was awarded the Aeronautical Medal of France in 1986. He died in Munich.
