= Beeckerwerth =

Coordinates: 51°28′31″N 6°42′04″E

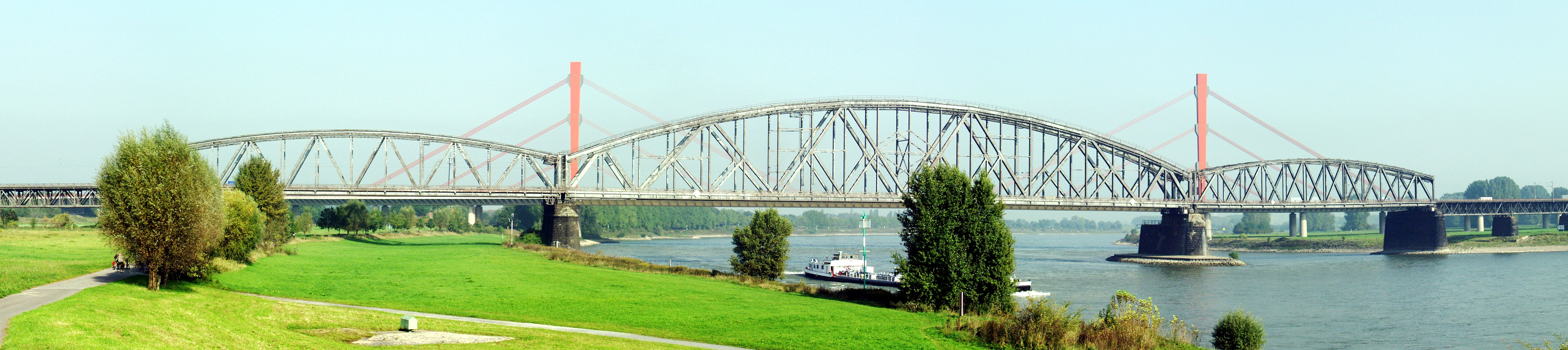
Haus-Knipp-Bridge.In the background the red pillars of the A42-Bridge can be seen.

Beeckerwerth (German pronunciation: [ˈbeːkɐˌveːɐ̯t]) is a district of Duisburg located in a bend right of the Rhine. It has a population of 3,807 and an area of 7.62 km^{2}.

== History ==
Until the Middle Ages, Beeckerwerth was surrounded by water on all sides: on the west and northwest by the Rhine, on the east and northeast by the Emscher and on the south by a branch of the Emscher called the Monnarde. This is the origin of the name of Beeckerwerth, which means "Island of Beeck" in Old German.

The house of Beeck ruled over Beeckerwerth since the 13th century. Their castle, Haus Knipp, was first mentioned in 1292. It served as their court until its destruction in 1571. It was rebuilt further inland in 1620.

Beeckerwerth became a borough of Duisburg on 1 October 1905, together with Beeck, Laar and Ruhrort.

The industrialist August Thyssen purchased most of Beeckerwerth, including Haus Knipp, in the early 20th century.

Haus Knipp was destroyed in 1939 when the dam was extended. The Haus-Knipp-Railroad-Bridge, which was constructed next to it in 1912, still bears its name. The bridge was destroyed during the Second World War and repaired by British army engineers in 1946.

== Public transport ==
The DVG operates two bus lines in Beeckerwerth: the 922 to Rheinhausen and the 907 to Walsum

== Sights ==
Europe's largest solar power project is located in Beeckerwerth. It marks the facade of the ThyssenKrupp steel slitting facility, and is visible from the A42 Autobahn.

== Notable people ==
- Hermann Oestrich (1903 - 1973), engineer, known for his work on the BWM 003 and Atar 101 engines.
