= Dassault Mystère =

Fighter-bomber in the French Air Force

MD.452 Mystère
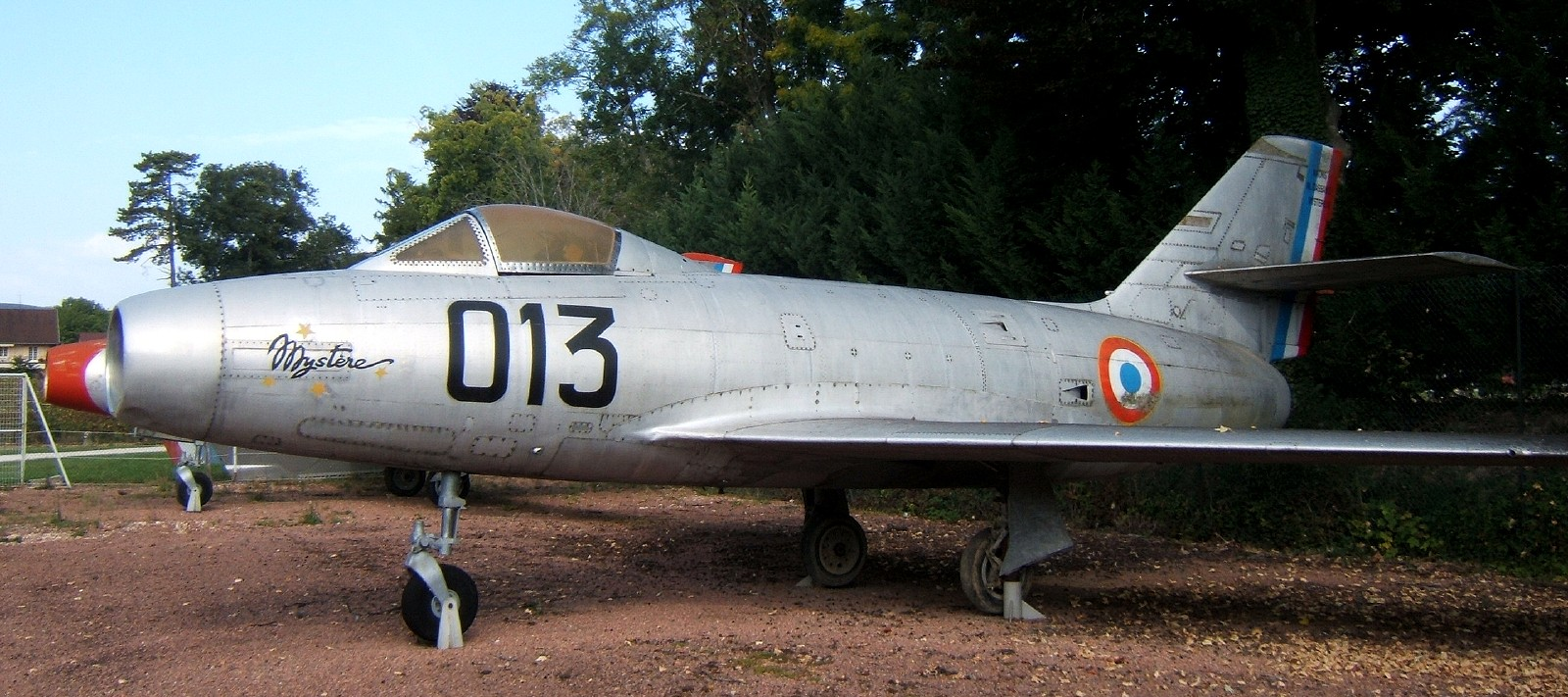

General information
- Type: Fighter-bomber
- National origin: France
- Manufacturer: Dassault Aviation
- Primary user: French Air Force
- Number built: 170

History
- Manufactured: 1951–1957
- Introduction date: 1954
- First flight: 23 February 1951
- Retired: 1963 (France)
- Developed into: Dassault Mystère IV

The Dassault MD.452 Mystère is a 1950s French fighter-bomber. It was a straightforward development of the successful Dassault Ouragan.

== Development ==
After the success of the Ouragan, Dassault was working on a more advanced machine which would take to the air in early 1951 as the MD.452 Mystère I.

The first prototype Mystère I was essentially an Ouragan with a 30-degree swept wing and modified tail surfaces. Two further prototypes followed, powered by the Rolls-Royce Tay 250 centrifugal-flow turbojet, an improved version of the Rolls-Royce Nene, built under licence by Hispano-Suiza, and rated at 28.0 kN (6,300 lbf) thrust.

These three Mystère I prototypes led to two Mystère IIA prototypes, powered by the Tay and armed with four 20 mm (0.787 in) Hispano cannon; and then four Mystère IIB prototypes, which traded the four 20 mm (0.787 in) cannon for two 30 mm (1.181 in) DEFA revolver-type cannon. A Mystère IIA was the first French aircraft to break Mach 1 in controlled flight (in a dive), on 28 October 1951.

The eleven preproduction machines that followed were designated Mystère IIC, nine of which were fitted with the SNECMA Atar 101C axial-flow turbojet, rated at 24.5 kN (5,500 lbf) thrust, while two were experimentally fitted with the afterburning Atar 101F, with an afterburning thrust of 37.3 kN (8,400 lbf).

== Operational history ==
The French Air Force ordered 150 Mystère IICs, with the first production machine flying in June 1954, being delivered in October of that year. The production aircraft featured the twin 30 mm (1.181 in) DEFA cannon, an Atar 101D turbojet with 29.4 kN (6,600 lbf) thrust, increased tail sweep, and revised intake trunking and internal fuel tank arrangement. Top speed was 1,030 km/h (560 kn; 640 mph) at low level. Details of external stores are unclear, but a reasonable assumption would be that they were similar to those of the Ouragan.

The last Mystère IIC was delivered in 1957, by which time the type was already being relegated to advanced training duties. Aircraft design was moving very quickly in the 1950s and even as the Mystère IIC was becoming operational, the better Dassault Mystère IVA was flying. The Mystère IIC was very much an interim type, though it did persist in the training role until 1963.

There were no foreign buyers for the Mystère II. As noted, the Israelis wanted to buy 24 of them, but changed their minds and bought the Mystère IVA instead. It appears that the Mystère II was never used in combat.

== Variants ==
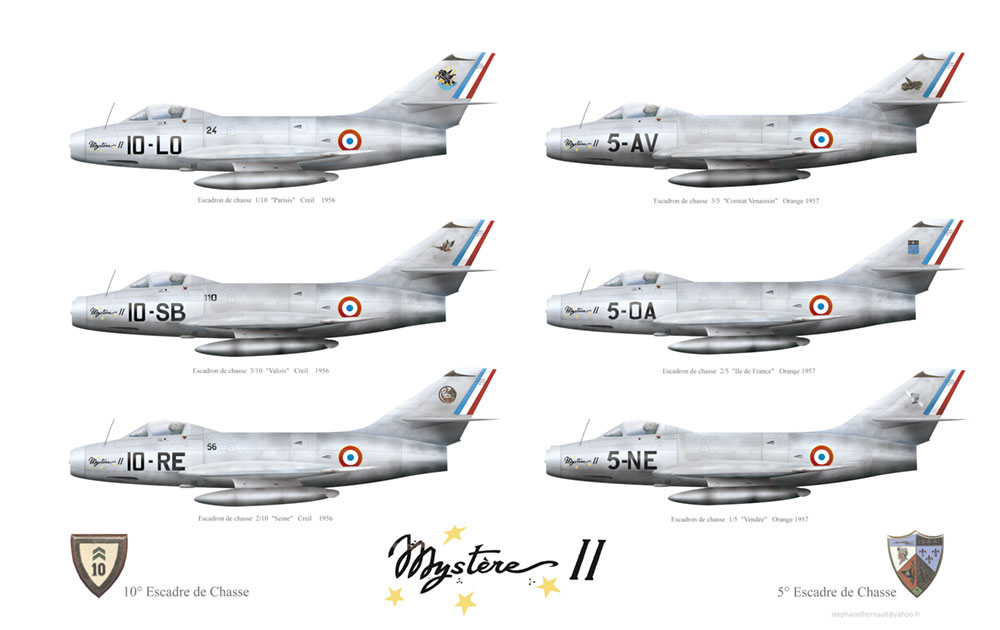
Dassault Mystère II 1956-1957

MD 452 Mystère I
The first of three prototypes was essentially an Ouragan with a 30-degree swept wing and modified tail surfaces. Two further prototypes followed, powered by the 28.0 kN (6,300 lbf) Rolls-Royce Tay 250 centrifugal-flow turbojet.
MD 452 Mystère IIA
Two prototypes powered by the Tay and armed with four Hispano 20 mm cannon.
MD 452 Mystère IIB
Four IIB prototypes traded the four 20 mm (0.787 in) cannon for two 30 mm (1.181 in) DEFA cannon
MD 452 Mystère IIC
The standard production aircraft for the French Air Force, with 150 delivered from June 1954. Eleven preproduction IICs were used for operational evaluation and trials with SNECMA Atar 101C axial-flow turbojet and the afterburning Atar 101F.
MD 453 Mystère IIIN
A single Mystère prototype built with lateral intakes and a two-seat cockpit, to continue development of the MD 451 Aladin initiated with the MD 450-30-L modified Ouragan. First flown on 18 July 1952 the sole IIIN was never fitted with a radar and was used for ejection seat trials once development of the MD 451 was abandoned. The second and third prototypes were cancelled before completion.

== Operators ==
France

- French Air Force

== Specifications (Mystère IIC) ==
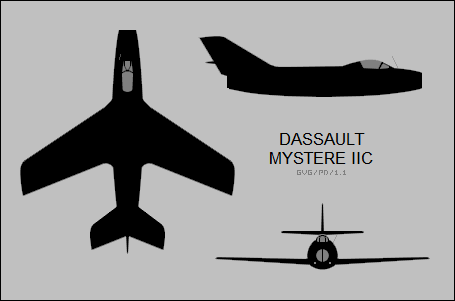
Dassault Mystère IIC

Data from The Complete Book of FightersGreen, William; Gordon Swanborough (1997). The Complete Book of Fighters. London: Salamander Books Limited. p. 148. ISBN 1-85833-777-1. and "Dassault MD.452 Mystere Single-Seat, Single-Engine Fighter / Fighter-Bomber Aircraft". www.militaryfactory.com.

General characteristics

- Crew: 1
- Length: 11.7 m (38 ft 5 in)
- Wingspan: 13.1 m (43 ft 0 in)
- Height: 4.26 m (14 ft 0 in)
- Wing area: 30.3 m^{2} (326 sq ft)
- Empty weight: 5,225 kg (11,519 lb)
- Max takeoff weight: 7,500 kg (16,535 lb)
- Powerplant: 1 × SNECMA Atar 101D axial flow turbojet, 29.4 kN (6,600 lbf) thrust

Performance

- Maximum speed: 1,060 km/h (660 mph, 570 kn)
- Range: 885 km (550 mi, 478 nmi)
- Service ceiling: 15,250 m (50,030 ft)
- Rate of climb: 23 m/s (4,500 ft/min)

Armament
2 x 30mm DEFA internal cannons

== See also ==
Related development

- Dassault Ouragan
- Dassault Mystère IV
- Dassault Super Mystère

Aircraft of comparable role, configuration, and era

- Mikoyan-Gurevich MiG-15
- North American F-86 Sabre

Related lists

- List of fighter aircraft
- List of military aircraft of France

== Bibliography ==
- Buttler, Tony (January 2019). "Dassault's X-Files: The Ouragan 30L, Barougan, Mystère de Nuit & Mystère IVN". The Aviation Historian (26): 40–50. ISSN 2051-1930.
- Carbonel, Jean-Christophe. French Secret Projects 1: Post War Fighters. Manchester, UK: Crecy Publishing, 2016 ISBN 978-1-91080-900-6
- Green, William; Swanborough, Gordon (1997). The Complete Book of Fighters. London: Salamander Books. p. 148. ISBN 1-85833-777-1.
- Donald, David; Lake, Jon, eds. (1996). Encyclopedia of world military aircraft. AIRtime Publishing. ISBN 1-880588-24-2.
- Kopenhagen, Wilfried, ed. (1987). Das große Flugzeug-Typenbuch [The large airplane type book] (in German). Transpress. ISBN 3-344-00162-0.
- Laurençot, Yves (October 1993). "Le Mystère II (4ème partie)" [The Mystère II, Part 4]. Avions: Toute l'aéronautique et son histoire (in French) (8): 18–23. ISSN 1243-8650.

The initial version of this article was based on a public domain article from Greg Goebel's Vectorsite.
