= Dassault Ouragan =

French fighter-bomber aircraft family

Ouragan
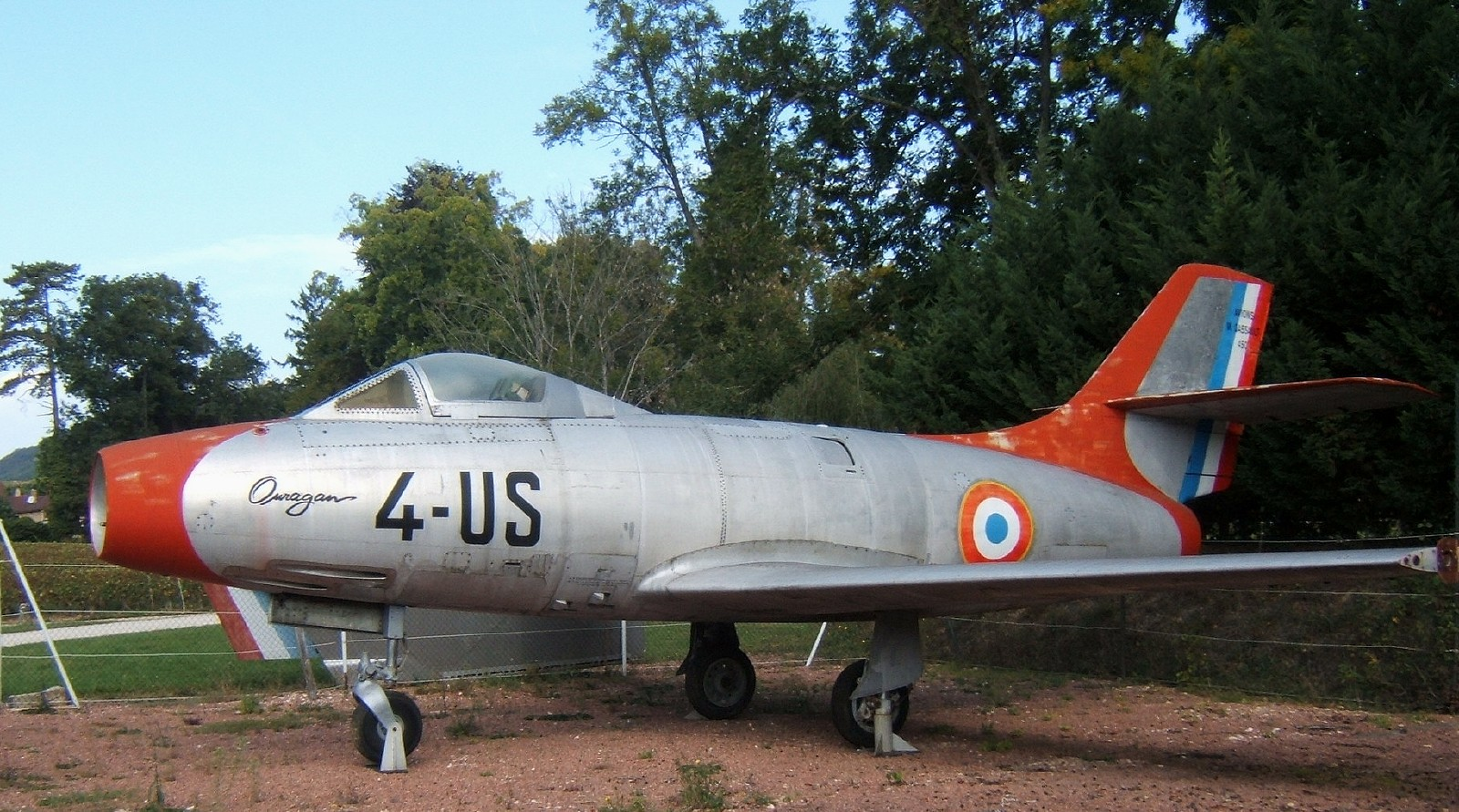
- A Dassault Ouragan with French Air Force markings

General information
- Type: Fighter-bomber
- Manufacturer: Dassault Aviation
- Designer: Marcel Dassault
- Primary users: French Air Force Indian Air Force; Israeli Air Force; Salvadoran Air Force
- Number built: Over 567

History
- Manufactured: 1948–1954
- Introduction date: 1952
- First flight: 28 February 1949
- Retired: 1985 (El Salvador)

The Dassault M.D.450 Ouragan (French: Hurricane) is a French fighter-bomber developed and produced by Dassault Aviation. It has its origins in a private venture by Dassault to produce an all-French aircraft which would make use of jet propulsion, which subsequently would receive orders from the French Air Force.

The Ouragan holds the distinction of being the first jet-powered French-designed combat aircraft to enter production, and thus played a key role in the resurgence of the French aviation industry following the Second World War. The Ouragan was operated by France, India, Israel and El Salvador. While in Israeli service, the type participated in both the Suez Crisis and the Six-Day War.

== Development ==
=== Origins ===
As a consequence of the nation being occupied by Germany during the majority of the Second World War, France had not been able to contribute significantly to the great strides that had been made in aircraft design during the conflict. In March 1945, aviation designer Marcel Bloch returned to France from captivity in the Buchenwald concentration camp and was eager to re-establish the aviation industry through the development and production of an all-French fighter, powered by newly developed jet propulsion technology. In particular, he was keen to develop the aircraft quickly enough to corner the emerging market for such an aircraft. In early 1946, Bloch renamed both himself and his new company Dassault, after his brother's wartime codename in the French Resistance.

In 1947, following the bare-bones preparation of a factory and equipment, Dassault formally embarked on the development of this all-French fighter, which was solely at his own initiative at the start. According to aviation historian Kenneth Munson, Dassault's design drew more on American rather than British inspiration, having elected to use features such as a very thin wing akin to the Lockheed P-80 Shooting Star and a basic configuration comparable to the North American F-86 Sabre. Due to its interceptor role, an emphasis had been placed on a fast rate of climb. The aircraft was powered by a single Rolls-Royce Nene turbojet engine, which was already being licence-produced in France by Hispano-Suiza for the SNCASE SE-535, which was in turn a licence-built version of the British de Havilland Vampire.

In September 1947, a series of talks outlining the project took place between Dassault and the Bureau d'Etudes et Plans d'Etat Major. The French government's response to the proposal was positive; however no firm order for the aircraft was placed at this time, necessitating the project to proceed as a private venture. In December 1947, the detailed design work phase of the project, which had been allocated the design number M.D. (Marcel Dassault) 450, commenced. On 7 April 1948, the construction of a prototype began at the company's factory in Saint-Cloud, near Paris. On 29 June 1948, Dassault's decision to proceed was met with the issuing of contract No. 2223/48 from the Service Technique de l'Aéronautique of the Ministère des Armées Air, which ordered the construction of three prototypes.

=== Prototypes ===
The rate of progress on the project was such that, within 15 months of design work having formally started, the first prototype, designated M.D.450-01, had been fully constructed and had performed its maiden flight. On 28 February 1949, the first prototype of the Ouragan fighter conducted its first flight with Dassault Chief Test Pilot Kostia Rozanoff at the controls. This prototype lacked pressurization, armament, and the distinctive wingtip fuel tanks of subsequent production aircraft. It was powered by a Rolls-Royce Nene 102 centrifugal-flow engine capable of generating 22.27 kN (2,270 kp/5,000 lbf) of thrust. During service trials in 1949, the first prototype attained a top speed of 980 km/h (529 knots, 609 mph) and achieved an initial climb rate of 43 m/s (8,465 ft/min).

In May 1949, the second prototype, M.D.450-02, made its maiden flight. This second prototype featured a pressurized cockpit and more complete internal equipment. In November 1949, the second prototype was dispatched to Centre d'Essais en Vol de Marignane to participate in manoeuvrability trials, during which it was recorded as having climbed to an altitude of 15,000 m (49,213 ft). In December 1949, the 450 liters (118.9 US gal) wingtip tanks that would become an indelible feature of all Ouragans first appeared. Testing of the second prototype was discontinued following the sustaining of damage during one landing due to an undercarriage malfunction.

The completion of the third prototype was delayed to incorporate lessons learned from the first two prototypes. On 2 June 1950, the third prototype, M.D.450-03, conducted its first flight. This third prototype was powered by a Hispano-Suiza-licensed Nene 104, as envisaged for use on production aircraft. It was dispatched to Centre d'Essais en Vol de Cazaux to conduct weapons trials while armed with 15 mm and later 20 mm cannons.

On 31 August 1949, the French Air Force ordered 15 pre-production aircraft, which were later reduced to 12, in order to support the test program. The contract was signed on 15 December 1949. These pre-production aircraft saw extensive use in various flying trials and evaluations, including various engines, armament schemes, and equipment payloads, as well as to support other development programs. Amongst these aircraft, which were designated M.D.450-1 through to M.D.450-12, were several notable revisions; M.D.450-6 was the first aircraft of the type to feature electrically operated trim tabs, M.D.450-8 (also known as M.D.450R), was configured as an aerial reconnaissance aircraft, and M.D.450-10, which was used as a flying testbed for the SNECMA Atar engine.

=== Production ===
According to Munson, around the time of the pre-production aircraft order, there had been considerations within the French Government for the procurement of up to 850 Ouragans under a five-year plan to recapitalise the French armed forces. On 31 August 1950, Dassault received an initial fixed order contract for 150 production Ouragans to equip the Armée de l'Air. In the following years, a further three orders, each ordering an additional 100 Ouragans, would be placed by the French government; however, the final of these additional orders would be cancelled in January 1952 in favour of an equivalent order for the newer and more advanced Dassault Mystère IIC.

Dassault's production facilities proved to be unable to attain the rate of production necessary to keep pace with the domestic orders, in part due to a lack of time to refine Ouragan's design to make it easier to mass-produce; accordingly, portions of the work were subcontracted to other French aircraft manufacturers. A manufacturing arrangement was formed with SNCASE to assemble forward fuselages for the aircraft at their Toulouse factory, while a similar agreement with SNCASO led to the firm manufacturing rear fuselages at Saint-Nazaire and wings in Bouguenais. Dassault's factories continued to produce the center fuselage and tail units, while the final assembly was carried out at Dassault's facility in Mérignac, Gironde.

On 5 December 1951, the first production Ouragan conducted its maiden flight. There was little difference between the pre-production and production aircraft, the most significant being alterations to the design of the doors enclosing the retractable nosewheel landing leg in response to accidents that occurred on the first two prototypes. By the end of 1952, a total of 39 production aircraft had been completed; a further 93 were manufactured in 1953, and the final 118 were finished by mid-1954.

A handful of production Ouragans were experimentally adapted for the intended use of the type from unprepared airstrips. Modifications included the substitution of the single-wheel main gear to a two-wheel configuration fitted with low-pressure tires, which retracted into a fairing installed under the wing roots; drogue parachutes were also installed. Aircraft so fitted were nicknamed "Barougan", derived from combining the Ouragan name with the Arabic word Baroud (battle). This configuration was intended for combat operations in Algeria. On 24 February 1954, the first Barougan performed its first flight. A further three aircraft would be used in the test programme, which involved multiple grass landings at varying weights. In 1958, further development of the Barougan variant was abandoned; some of the test aircraft were later re-converted back to the standard Ouragan configuration.

== Design ==
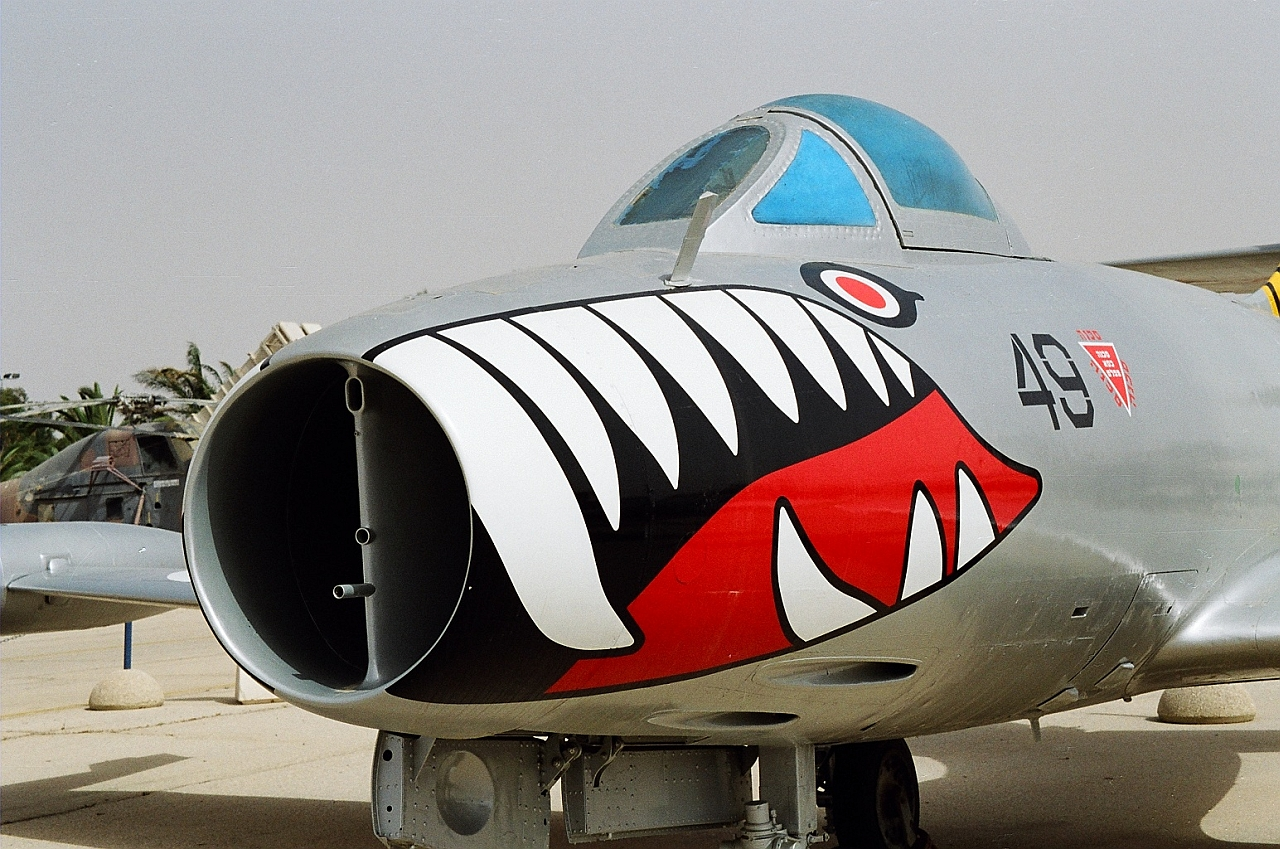
Forward section of an Ouragan

The Dassault Ouragan was an early jet-powered fighter aircraft. It employed a straightforward basic layout, with a single divided air intake in the nose that carried air around either side of the cockpit to the engine, which was located directly behind the pilot. The design was inspired by the Republic F-84 Thunderjet, with its fuselage highly cylindrical and tapered at either end, an intake on the nose (although this was the convention among early jet-age fighters), its bubble canopy, and its tricycle landing gear. Its design was further refined through the relatively thin wings and swept-back vertical stabilizer, which was akin to the MiG-17's. The Ouragan was powered by a single Rolls-Royce Nene turbojet engine, produced under license by Hispano-Suiza. Early aircraft were equipped with Martin-Baker Mk.1 ejection seats, however the majority of production aircraft were outfitted with SNCASO E.86 ejection seats instead. Some of the more advanced aerodynamic features of the Ouragan included its swept tailplane and its thin wing, which was tapered along the leading edge.

The design was largely optimized for its role as a fighter aircraft. Its typical weapons stores reflected an attack role, however. Typical stores were two 450 kilogram (1000lbs) pound bombs, 16 105-millimeter (4 inch) Matra T-10 rockets, or 8 rockets and two 460 liter (121 US Gallon) napalm bombs. The aircraft themselves came with four Mark V 20mm Hispano cannons beneath the engine intake.

The aircraft was reported to be highly stable while firing the Hispano Mk. V autocannons as well as its rockets. It, however, also had a tendency to flat spin while holding tight turns, as a result of the length to diameter ratio of its fuselage being relatively low compared to other fighters at the time.

Export variants, such as those intended for war in Algeria nicknamed Barougans, were fitted with brake parachutes as well as their single-wheel main gear being replaced with a two-wheel configuration. This provided the aircraft with the capability to be operated in rough field conditions where airstrips would not be as well maintained.

== Operational history ==
=== Armee de l'Air ===
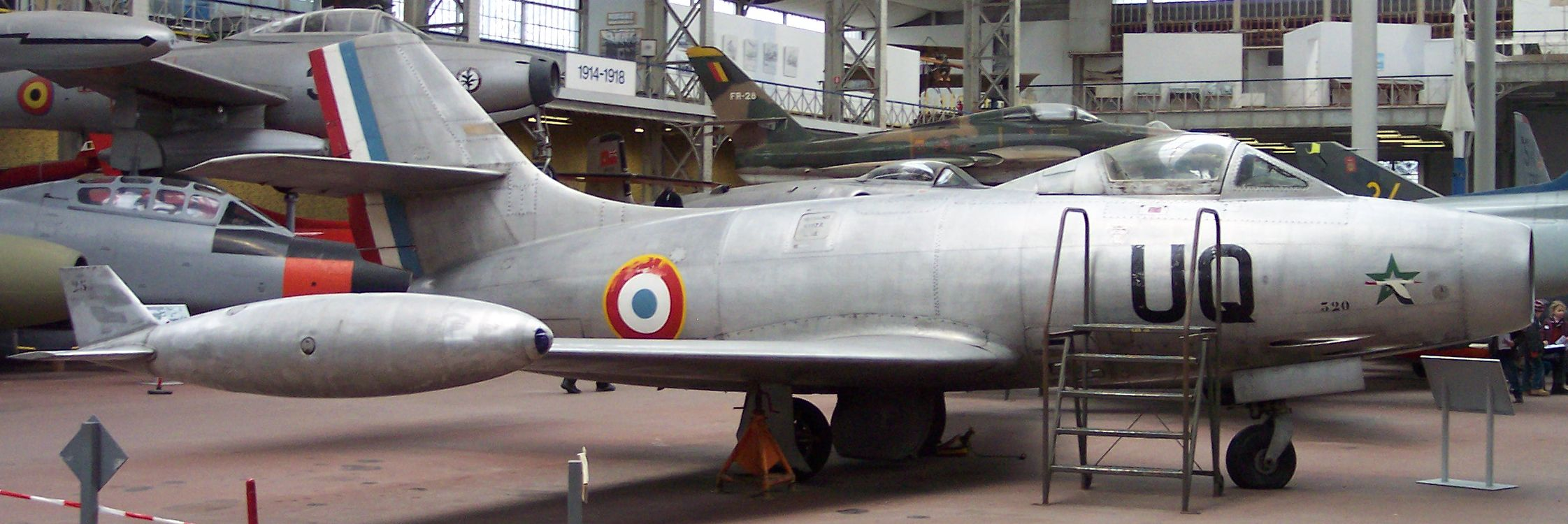
MD450 Ouragan on display with wingtip fuel tanks.

In August 1950, prior to the delivery of any pre-production aircraft, the French government placed an initial order for 150 production Ouragans, with ambitions for as many 850 Ouragans in service with the Armee de l'Air. In 1952, the Ouragan formally entered squadron service with the French Air Force in 1952, where it started to replace aircraft such as the British De Havilland Vampire.

Due to the rapid entry to service of the type, Ouragan's full test programme had not been completed, and this led to multiple instances of pilots inadvertently executing involuntary manoeuvres. In particular, the aircraft had a tendency to sharply snap during a hard turn, leading to unintended spins. Overall, the Ouragan reportedly proved pleasant to fly; according to Mason, French pilots were pleased with the stability of the aircraft, lending itself well to firing both guns and rockets. Its favourable handling qualities led to the Ouragan performing for two years as the display aircraft of the la Patrouille de France aerobatic team.

The first 50 Ouragans were built to the M.D.450A standard, equipped with the Nene 102 engine; the majority of aircraft delivered were to the later M.D.450B standard, being fitted with a Hispano-Suiza-built Nene 104B engine, which was lighter than the Nene 102 and with slightly greater thrust. Wingtip fuel tanks were fitted as standard in both variants.

In French service, the frontline service of the Ouragan was short-lived; from May 1955 onwards, the type began to be replaced by the more capable Dassault Mystère IV. In 1961, the last Ouragans were displaced from operational units; a number of aircraft were retained beyond this date in secondary capacities such as advanced tactical and gunnery trainers throughout the mid-1960s.

=== India ===
On 25 June 1953, India placed an order for 71 Ouragans, these being broadly similar to standard production models, except for being powered by the slightly uprated Nene 105 engine. The first four Ouragans were delivered by air in late October 1953, while further deliveries were performed by sea; by mid-1954, all aircraft had been delivered. In March 1957, two additional orders for 20 and 13 second-hand Ouragans were placed, bringing the total procured by India to 104. The selection of the French-built Ouragan at this time is claimed to have reflected a deliberate decision to initiate diversification of supply sources. In Indian service, the aircraft was given the name Toofani (Hindi: Hurricane), the Hindi equivalent meaning the French name of the type.

In 1961, Indian Toofanis were flown on active service, reportedly carrying out airstrikes in support of Indian Army forces engaged with Portuguese forces on the island of Diu, on the western coast of the Indian subcontinent. Four Toofanis armed with 1000 lbs. bombs took off from Jamnagar early morning on 18 December 1961 to strike Diu aerodrome. However, due to a miscommunication, the strikes were called off and the aircraft jettisoned their payloads over the Arabian Sea. Later another six toofanis would strike the aerodrome and damaged Diu's control tower, wireless station and the meteorological station. They were also used in ground-attack missions against anti-government rebels in Assam and Nagaland, and in 1962 to perform reconnaissance missions during the Sino-Indian War.

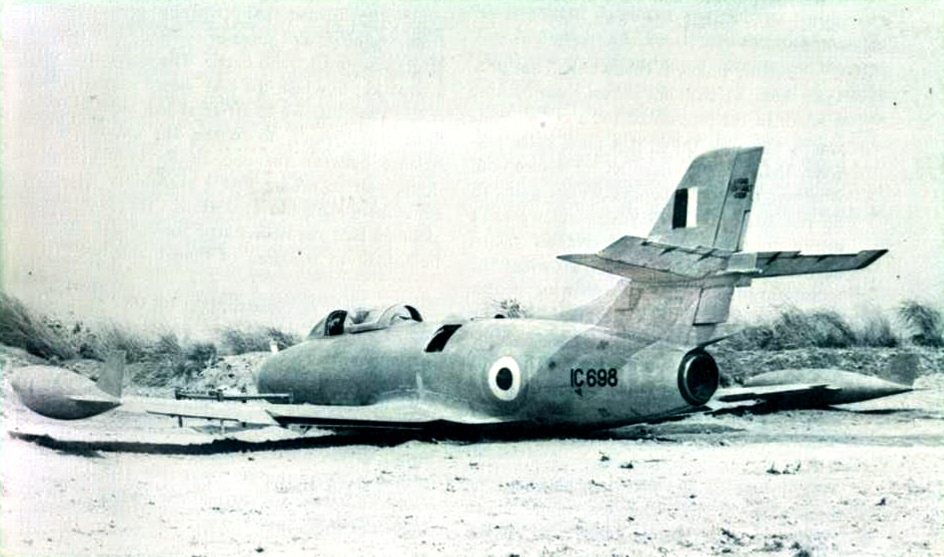
An Indian Air Force Ouragan Fighter Bomber was forced to land near Badin by PAF fighters during the 1965 Rann of Kutch conflict

On 24 April 1965, a single Toofani strayed over the border with Pakistan, and was forced to land by PAF fighters; while the pilot was returned to India, the aircraft was retained and ended up being displayed as a war trophy at a museum in Peshawar. It was later scrapped.

As was the case in France, the Ouragan started to be replaced in frontline service by the Mystère IVA in 1957, being withdrawn fully from frontline service in 1965, although it continued in use for some years as an advanced trainer and target tug.

=== Israel ===
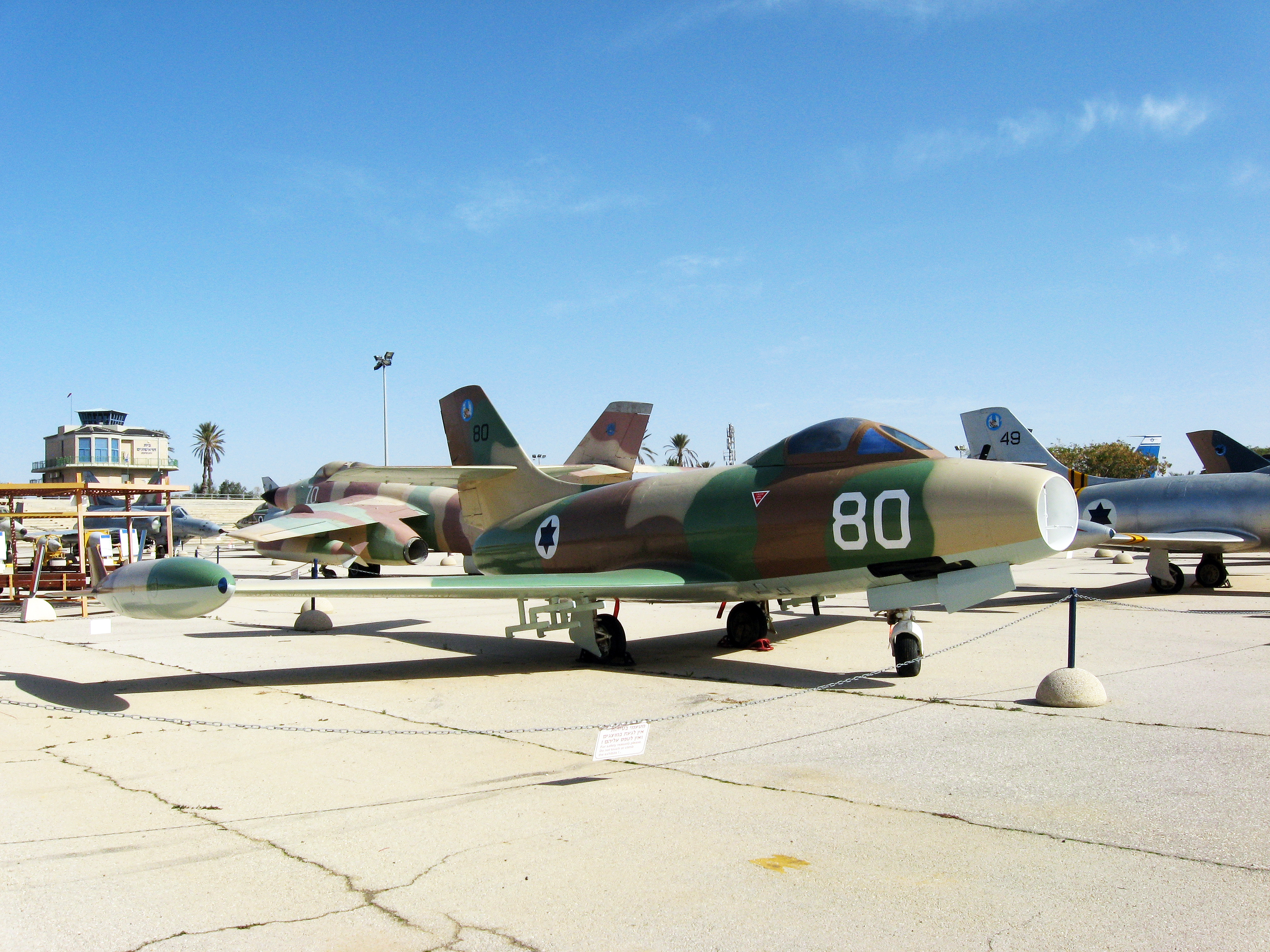
Ouragan at the Israeli Air Force Museum in Hatzerim.

In contrast to France and India, the Israel Air Force (IAF) became an enthusiastic Ouragan user. During the early 1950s, Israel, under pressure from regional hostilities with neighbouring Arab nations, was keen to acquire new military equipment of its own, particularly as Arab air forces were themselves commonly procuring advanced Soviet armaments such as the Mikoyan-Gurevich MiG-15 fighter. Seeking to augment its jet aircraft fleet of British Gloster Meteors, the IAF initially evaluated both French Dassault Mystère IIC and Canadian-built Canadair Sabre Mk.6 fighters. Due to development problems with the Mystère and a Canadian embargo on the Sabres, the order was changed to Mystère IVAs alongside a batch of Ouragans that were purchased as a stop-gap measure.

By 1955, the IAF had received at least 75 aircraft, comprising a mix of newly built and retired French Air Force examples, with deliveries being completed that year. The Israeli Ouragans were assigned to a total of five squadrons for the purpose of performing close air support operations, since they could not match the performance of Egyptian MiG-15s. On 12 April 1956, an Israeli Ouragan shot down an Egyptian de Havilland Vampire flying over Israeli territory, it being the first recorded kill by an Ouragan in Israeli service.

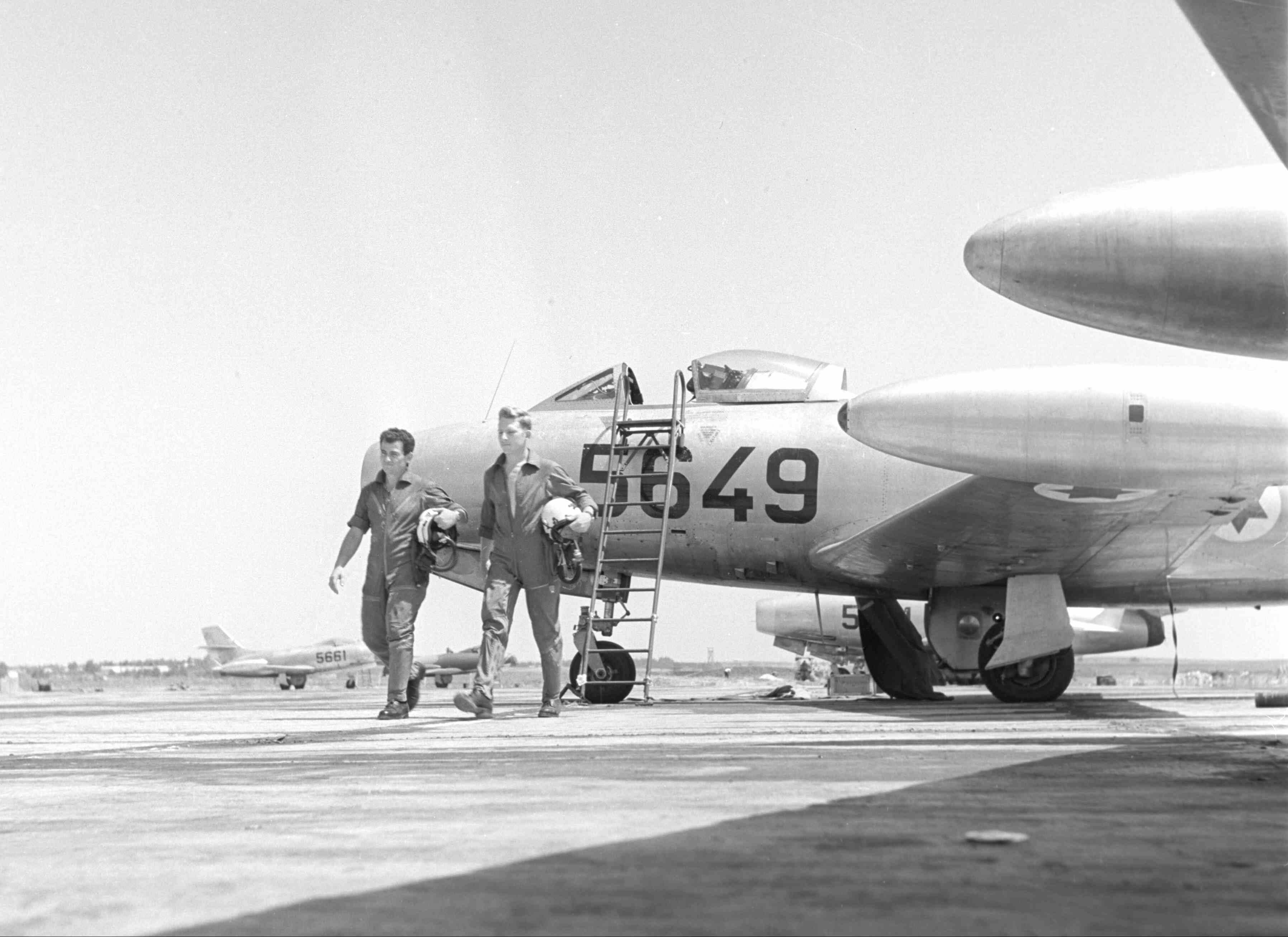
Israeli Dassault Ouragans in 1956

During the 1956 Suez Crisis, Ouragans principally flew ground-attack missions, but also flew escort missions. In the early hours of 30 October 1956, a pair of Ouragans shot down four hostile de Havilland Vampires in the Mitla Pass area. The two documented encounters between the Soviet-built MiG-15 fighters and the Ouragan (which were also powered by the Nene engine but furnished with a more modern swept wing) ended with one Ouragan surviving several 37 mm (1.46 in) cannon hits to fly the next day and one MiG-15 being heavily damaged by cannon fire after it entered a turning dogfight with the Ouragans. The poor training of the Egyptian pilots who were consistently unable to realize their advantage in numbers as well as the MiG-15's speed and climb characteristics, helped Ouragans to survive despite their inferior performance.

On 31 October 1956, a pair of Ouragans armed with rockets strafed the Egyptian destroyer Ibrahim el Awal (ex-HMS Mendip), contributing to the capture of the ship. According to Munson, Israeli Ouragans were responsible for the destruction of a major proportion of the hostile tanks and military vehicles that came under aerial attack during the conflict, while only two Ouragans were lost during the five days of fighting, both of which were attributed to small arms fire. The Commander-in-Chief of the Israel Defense Forces (IDF) is reported to have later stated "The Ouragan was a much better aeroplane than had been thought".

In the aftermath of the Suez Crisis, the Ouragans were soon mostly relegated to secondary roles such as advanced training; by 1967, the type still equipped two close-support units along with an operational training unit. Israeli Ouragans saw more combat in the 1967 Six-Day War. In 1975, the IAF sold 18 Ouragans to El Salvador, where they remained in service until the late 1980s.

=== El Salvador ===
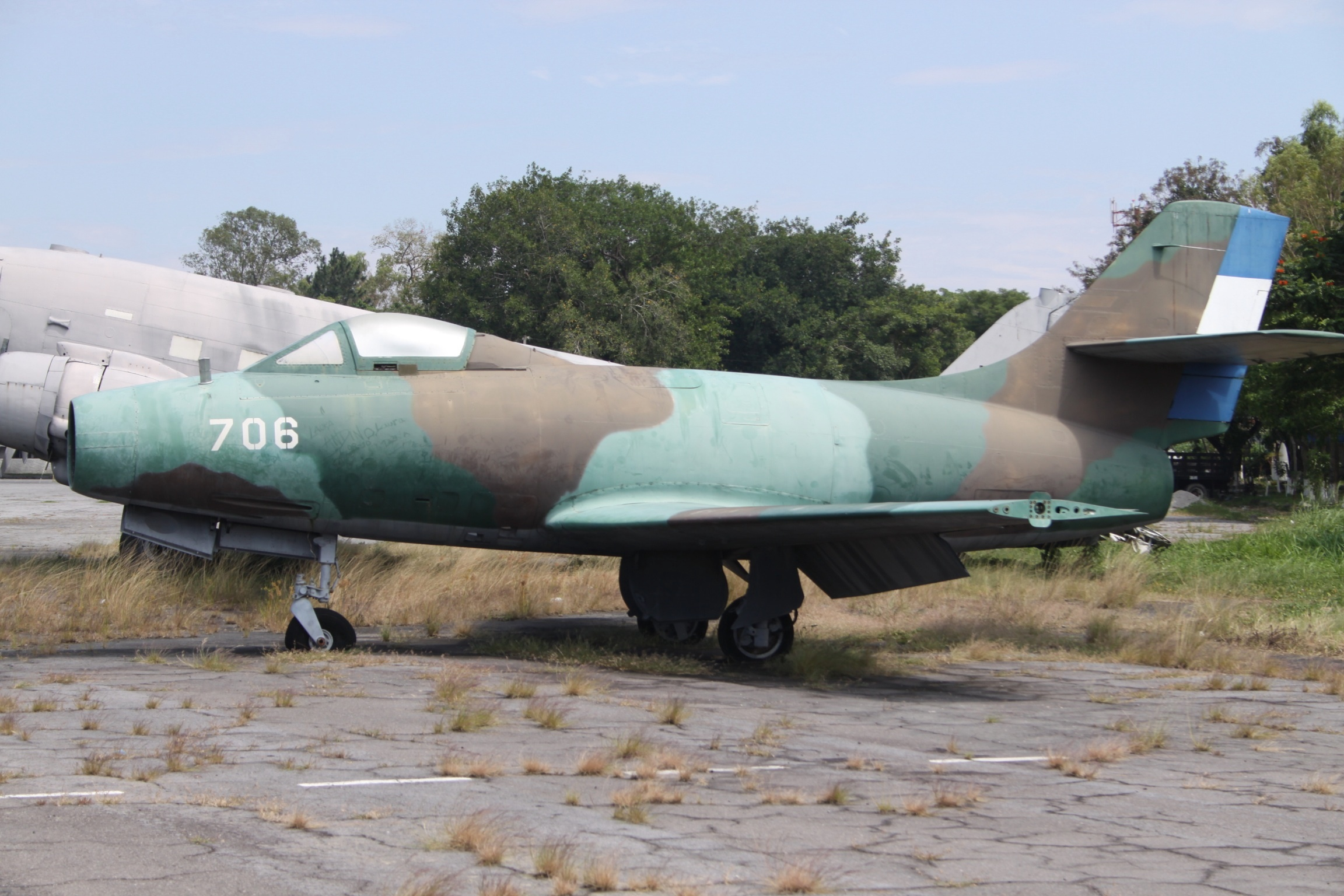
Dassault Ouragan of the El Salvador Air Force.

In the wake of the Football War of 1969, El Salvador began a concerted push to modernize its air force. Unable to buy combat aircraft from the United States due to a US government arms embargo, the Salvadorans bought 18 surplus Israeli Ouragans on the international arms market. These aircraft were refurbished by the Israelis and were delivered to El Salvador between 1973 and 1978.

El Salvador's Ouragans saw extensive combat during the Salvadoran Civil War of 1979 to 1992. Salvadoran Ouragans flew strike missions against communist FMLN forces, operating from Ilopango Air Base located near the capital city of San Salvador. As El Salvador is not a large country and combat radius was not a pressing concern, Salvadoran Ouragans in combat usually operated with their wingtip fuel tanks removed in order to save weight and allow for greater weapons loads. On the 25th of January, 1981, an El Salvadorian Ouragan downed an aircraft that was being used to smuggle arms to leftist guerrillas opposed to the regime, this being the only air to air kill of the war.

An FMLN attack against Ilopango Air Base in 1982 destroyed several Ouragans and accelerated the push to supplant, and eventually replace, the Ouragans with American-made Cessna A-37B Dragonfly ground-attack aircraft, which were made available after the Reagan Administration dropped the arms embargo. The remaining Ouragans served on for several more years, but were all retired by the war's end.

Salvadoran Ouragans have been pictured in several camouflage schemes, and it is possible that during the war the Ouragan fleet operated in colors that were never completely standardized.

At least one survivor of El Salvador's Ouragan fleet is currently on static display at Ilopango.

== Variants ==
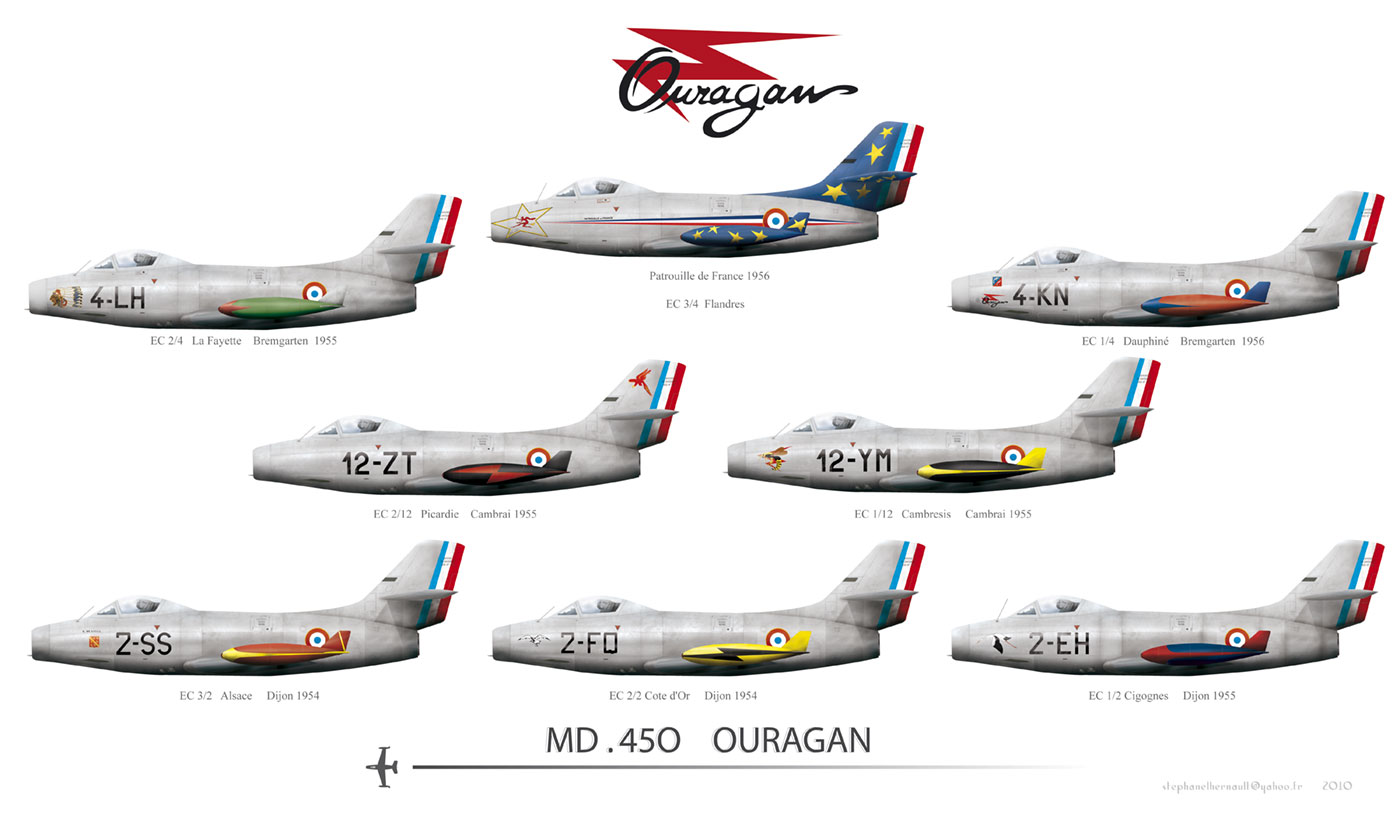
Armée de l'Air Dassault MD 450 Ouragans

MD 450A Ouragan
First 50 production aircraft, Nene 102 engine.
MD 450B Ouragan
Hispano-Suiza-built Nene 104B engine, revised two-section nose landing gear doors as the original four-section design was prone to damage when the cannon were fired.
MD 450R Ouragan
Reconnaissance variant, only one built.
MD 450-30L Ouragan
One preproduction prototype fitted with a SNECMA Atar 101B engine, air intakes on the sides of the fuselage, and two 30 mm (1.181 in) DEFA cannon. First flown on 21 January 1952 it was used to gain experience before the first flight of the Dassault 453.
Dassault Barougan
Four production aircraft modified for rough-field operation with the two-wheel main landing gear with low-pressure tires retracting into a fairing added under the wing roots, and a brake parachute.

== Operators ==
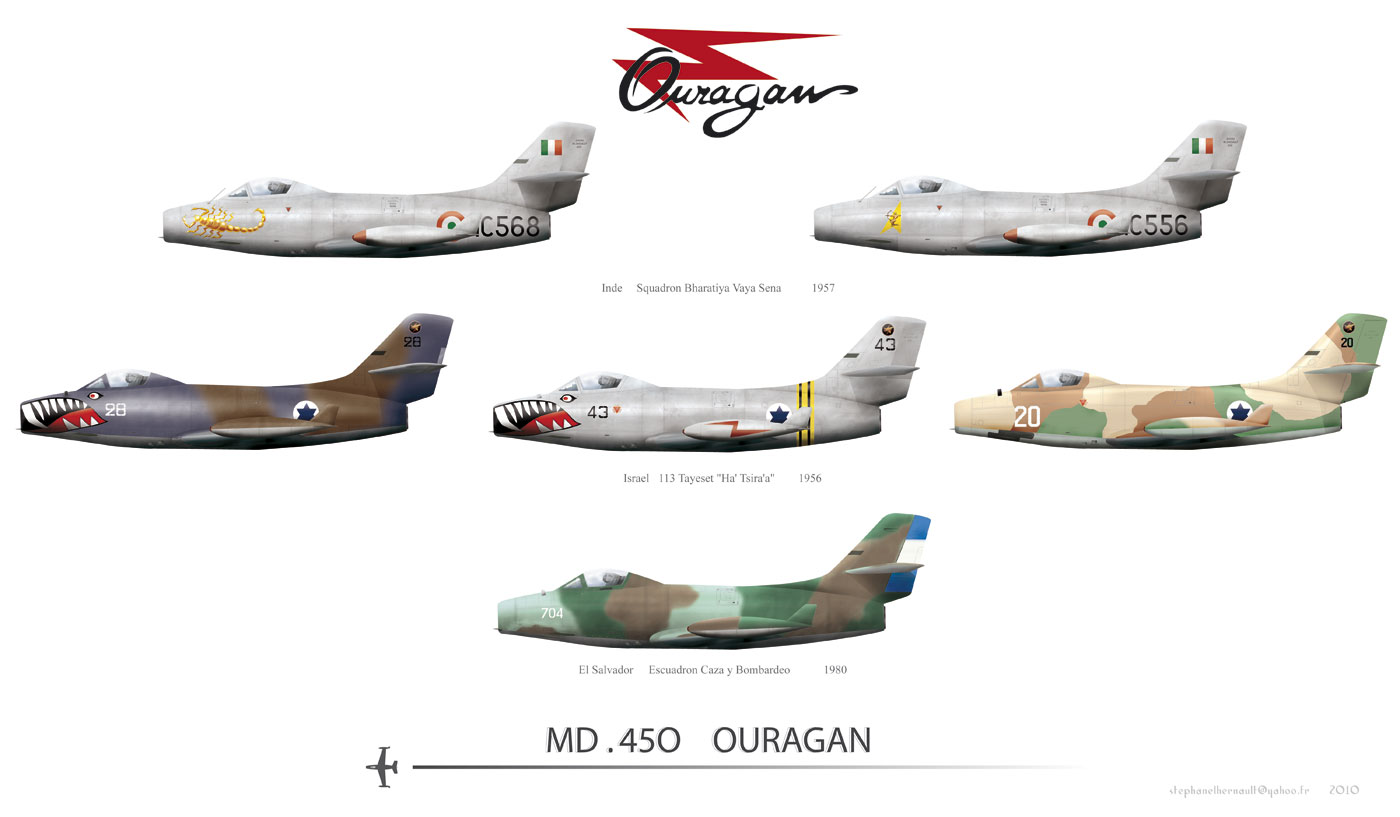
Foreign Dassault MD 450 Ouragans

Numbers from World Air Forces

France

- French Air Force operated 370 examples including prototypes.

India

- Indian Air Force operated 104 examples.

Israel

- Israeli Air Force operated 75 examples.

El Salvador

- El Salvador Air Force operated 18 examples.

== Aircraft on display ==
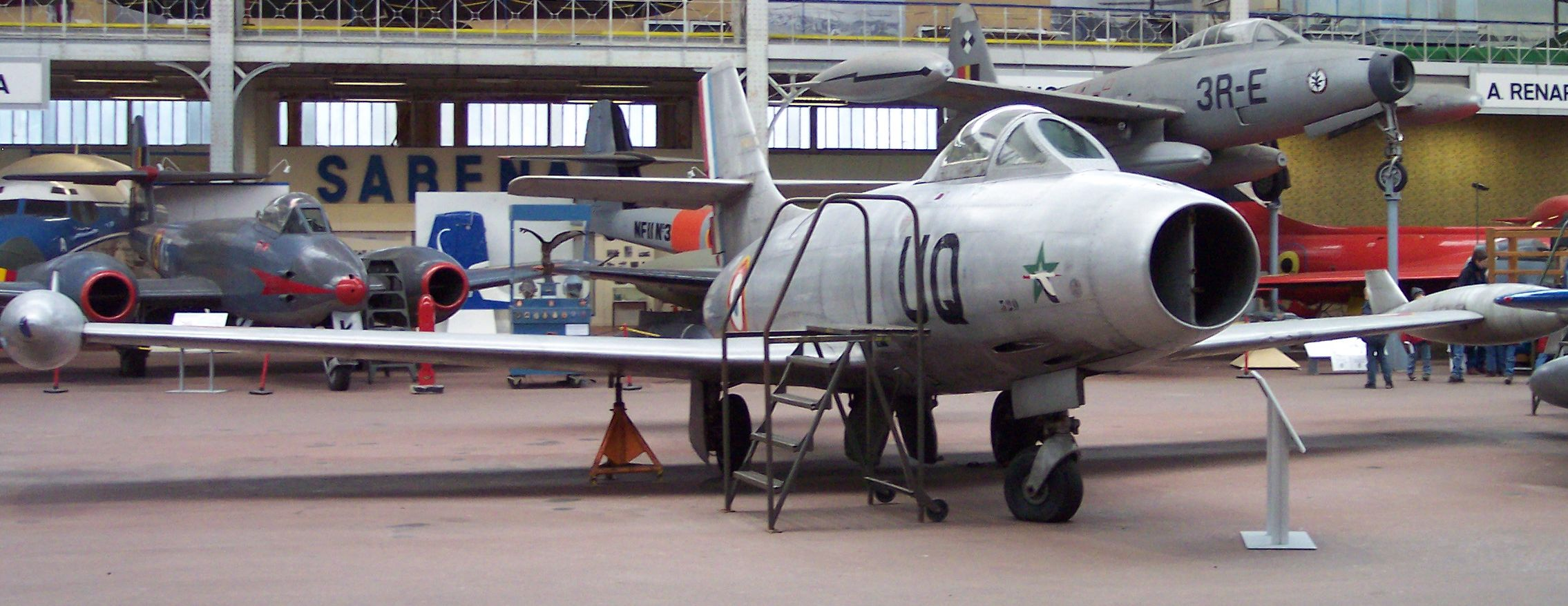
Ouragan at Brussels Air Museum

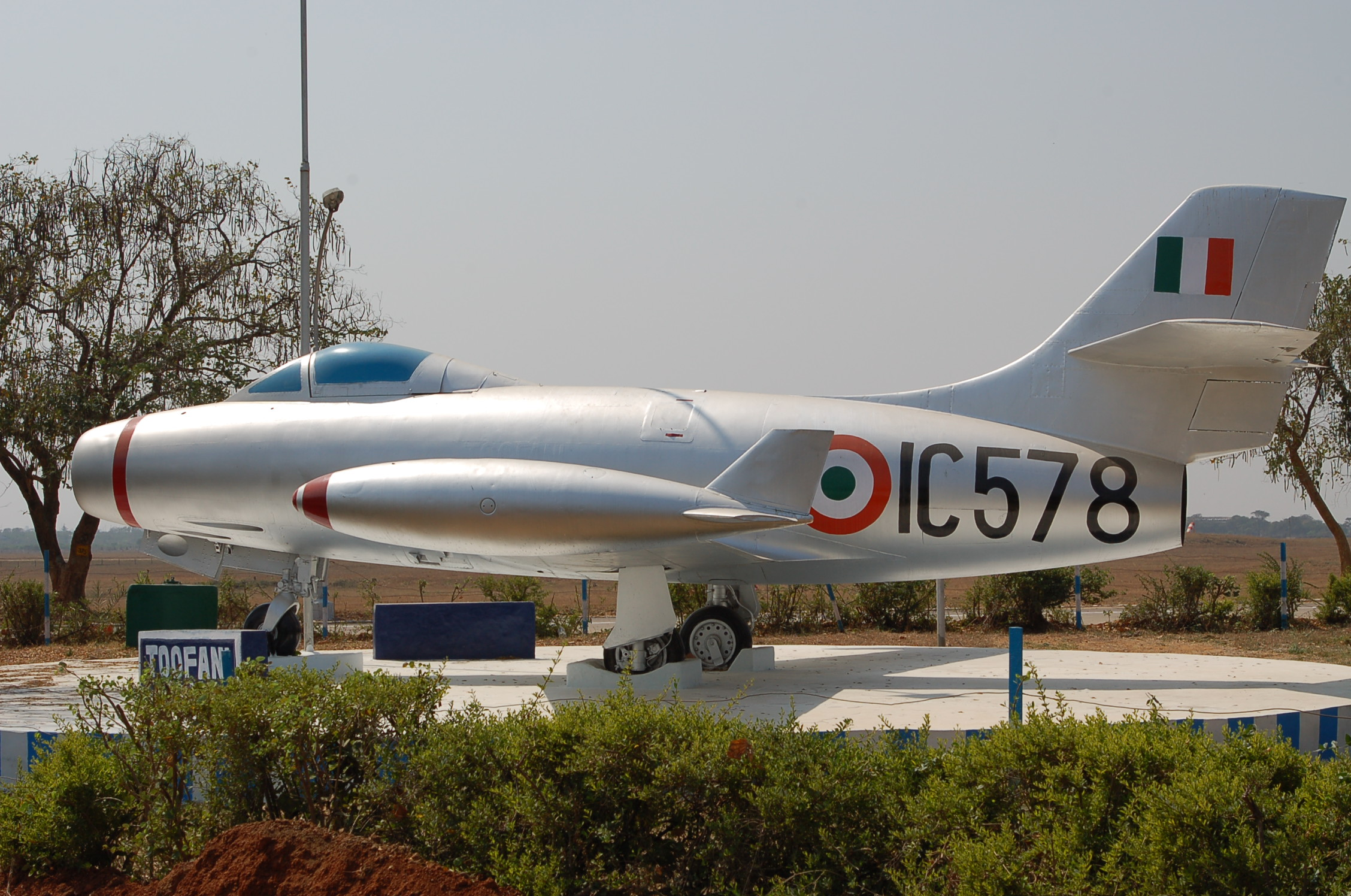
Ouragan at the Indian Air Force Academy Museum

Belgium

An Armee de L'air Ouragan ("UQ") is displayed at the Royal Museum of the Armed Forces and Military History in Brussels.

France

A number of MD.450 Ouragan examples are preserved in France including #251 and #450/"4-US", part of the jet aircraft collection at Chateau Savigny-lès-Beaune. The Musee de l'Air et de l'Espace at Le Bourget Airport has #154/ "4-LT" painted in a colorful "Indian-head" scheme but a previous code is just visible under the 4-LT markings. Ouragan #214/"UG," previously stored, is exhibited in the "Patrouille de France" paint scheme at the "Musée Européen de l'Aviation de Chasse," Montélimar.

Israel

Israeli Air Force Ouragans "80" and "49", both combat veterans and survivors of the 1956 Suez War and 1967 Six-Day War, are on outdoor display at the Israeli Air Force Museum.

India

An MD.450 Ouragan (Toofani), "IC 554," is on display at the Indian Air Force Museum, Palam, New Delhi. It was painted earlier in grey-green camouflage but now appears in natural metal in No. 47 "Black Archers" Squadron markings.

El Salvador

Two Ouragans are on display in the Museo Nacional de Aviación, Ilopango Air Base.

== Specifications (M.D.450B) ==
Dassault Ouragan 3-view drawing

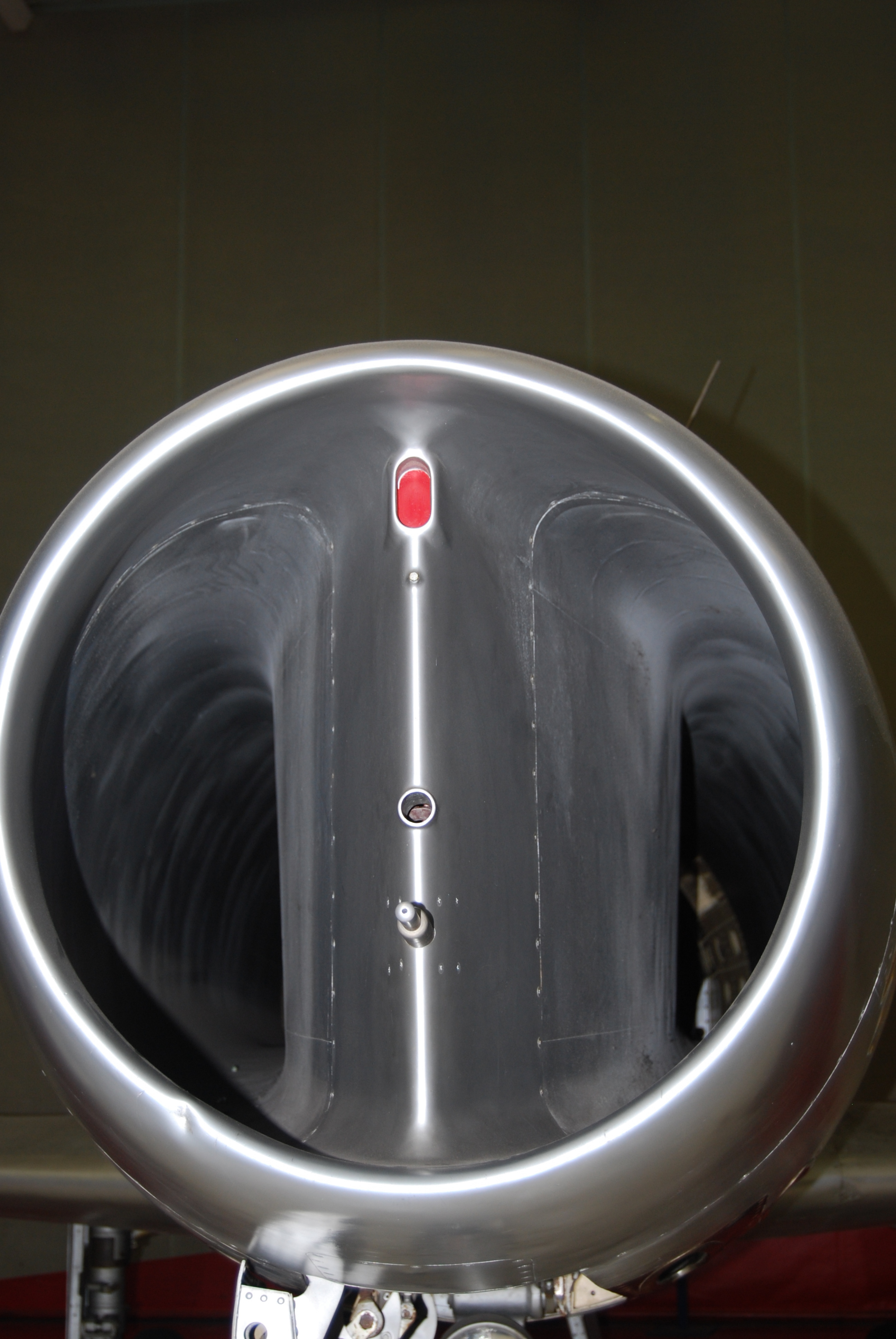
Close up of the split air intake of a preserved Ouragan

Data from The Dassault M.D. 450 Ouragan: Profile 143, The Great Book of Fighters

General characteristics

- Crew: 1
- Length: 10.73 m (35 ft 2 in)
- Wingspan: 13.16 m (43 ft 2 in)
- Height: 4.14 m (13 ft 7 in)
- Wing area: 23.8 m^{2} (256 sq ft)
- Aspect ratio: 7.3
- Airfoil: root: NACA 65-112.9; tip: NACA 65-211.8
- Empty weight: 4,142 kg (9,132 lb)
- Gross weight: 7,404 kg (16,323 lb)
- Max takeoff weight: 7,900 kg (17,417 lb)
- Powerplant: 1 × Rolls-Royce Nene Mk.104B centrifugal-flow turbojet engine, 22.2 kN (5,000 lbf) thrust

Performance

- Maximum speed: 940 km/h (580 mph, 510 kn) at sea level
- Maximum speed: Mach 0.76
- Cruise speed: 750 km/h (470 mph, 400 kn)
- Maximum Mach number:(M_{MO}) M0.83
- Combat range: 450 km (280 mi, 240 nmi)
- Ferry range: 920 km (570 mi, 500 nmi)
- Service ceiling: 13,000 m (43,000 ft)
- Rate of climb: 38 m/s (7,500 ft/min)
- Take-off run: 783 m (2,569 ft)
- Landing run: 910 m (2,986 ft)

Armament

- Guns: 4× 20 mm Hispano-Suiza HS.404 cannon with 125 rounds per gun
- Rockets: 16× 105 mm (4.1 in) Brandt T-10 air-to-ground unguided rockets; or, 2× Matra rocket pods with 18× SNEB 68 mm rockets each
- Bombs: 908 kg (2,002 lb) of payload on four external hardpoints, including a variety of unguided iron bombs such as 2× 227 kg (500 lb) bombs or 2× 458 L (121 US gal; 101 imp gal) napalm bombs / Drop tanks for extended range.

== See also ==
External videos
- Period footage of Ouragan aircraft during assembly and performing formation flight displays
- Still close-up images of a preserved Ouragan
- British Pathé footage of Ouragan assembly

Related development

- Dassault Mystère

Aircraft of comparable role, configuration, and era

- de Havilland Venom – (United Kingdom)
- Lockheed F-80 Shooting Star – (United States)
- Mikoyan-Gurevich MiG-9 – (Soviet Union)
- Yakovlev Yak-23 – (Soviet Union)
- Republic F-84 Thunderjet – (United States)
- Saab 29 Tunnan – (Sweden)
