= List of aircraft (Sf) =

This is a list of aircraft in alphabetical order beginning with 'Sf'.

== Sf ==
=== SFA ===
(Svenska Flygmotor Aktiebolaget)

- SFA STWC3-G

=== SFAN ===
(Société Française d'Aviation Nouvelle, France)

- SFAN I
- SFAN II
- SFAN III
- SFAN IV
- SFAN 5 Deluxe
- SFAN 11

=== SFCA ===
(Société Française de Construction Aéronautique, France)

- SFCA Lignel 10
- SFCA Lignel 16
- SFCA Lignel 161
- SFCA Lignel 20
- SFCA Lignel 20S
- SFCA Lignel 31
- SFCA Lignel 44 Cross-Country
- SFCA Lignel 46 Coach
- SFCA Maillet 20
- SFCA Maillet 201
- SFCA Maillet 21
- SFCA Maillet-Lignel 20
- SFCA Taupin
- SFCA Taupin 5/2

=== SFECMAS ===
(Société Française d'Etude et de Construction de Matériel Aéronautiques Spéciaux, France)

- SFECMAS 1301
- SFECMAS 1402 Gerfaut
- SFECMAS 1500 Guépard

=== SFERMA ===
(Société Française d'Entretien et de Réparation de Matériel Aéronautique, France)

- SFERMA Nord 1110
- SFERMA SF-60 Marquis
- SFERMA BS.60 Marquis
- SFERMA PD-146 Marquis
- S.F.E.R.M.A.-Nord 1110 Nord-Astazou

=== SFG ===
(Société Française du Gyroplane, France)

- SFG G.11E Gyroplane (manuf. at Breguet)
- SFG G.111 Gyroplane (manuf. at Breguet)
- SFG G.20 Gyroplane (manuf. at Breguet)

=== SFI ===
(Sächsische Flugindustrie G.m.b.H.)

- SFI Ga1

=== SFKB ===
(Samoletna Fabrika Caproni Bulgarski)

- SFKB KB-1 Peperuda ("Butterfly")
- SFKB KB-2 UT ("Instructor-Training")
- SFKB KB-2A Tchutchuliga ("Skylark")
- SFKB KB-3 Tchutchuliga-I
- SFKB KB-4 Tchutchuliga-II
- SFKB KB-5 Tchutchuliga-III
- SFKB KB-309 Papagal ("Parrot") – (KB-6)
- SFKB KB-11 Fazan (Фазан – Pheasant)

=== Sfreddo & Paolini ===
(Sociedad Anonima Sfreddo & Paolini)

- Sfreddo y Paolini I
- Sfreddo y Paolini II
- Tucan T-1
