= Arsenal VG 70 =

French prototype jet

VG 70
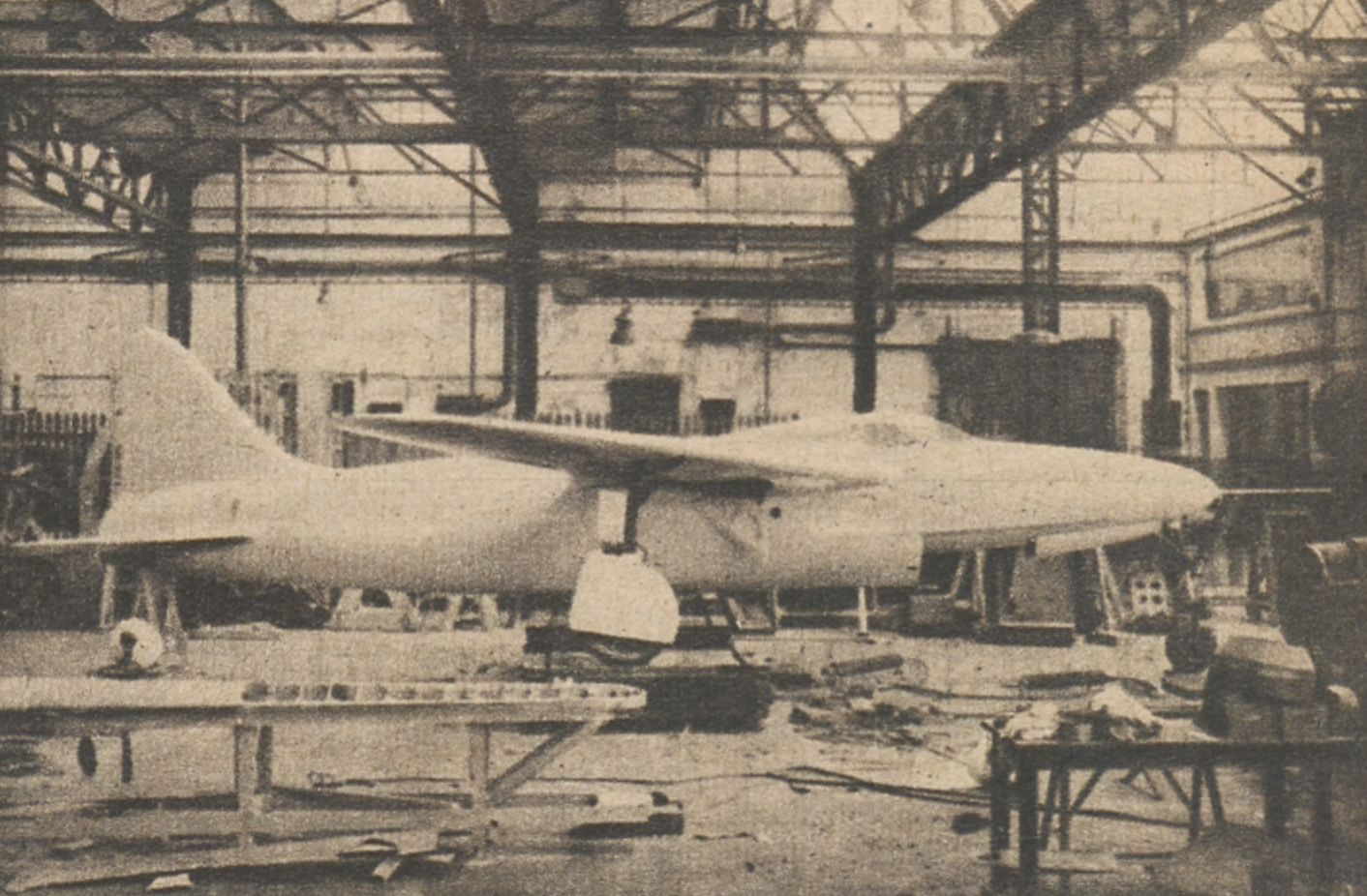
- The prototype of the Arsenal VG 70 under construction in 1947

General information
- Type: Research aircraft
- Manufacturer: Arsenal de l'Aéronautique
- Designer: Jean Galtier
- Number built: 1

History
- First flight: 23 June 1948
- Retired: 1948

The Arsenal VG 70 was a single-seat monoplane research aircraft flown in France shortly after World War II to assist in the development of high-speed jet fighters. Lacking an indigenous turbojet engine, the aircraft was fitted with a German Junkers Jumo 004. Unlike most jet-powered aircraft of the period, the swept wing was wooden as was the tail structure. The under-powered VG 70 made its maiden flight in 1948, but only flew five times before the program was terminated the following year.

== Development and description ==
Jean Galtier, chief designer at Arsenal de l'Aéronautique, decided to build a turbojet-powered research aircraft in late 1945. He wished to investigate the aerodynamics of swept wings at high speeds to take advantage of captured German data to better understand how they might impact future fighter designs. Its all-metal fuselage was derived from the VG-30 prewar series of piston-engined fighters and Galtier took advantage of the company's experience of wooden construction to build the wing and empennage out of wood. The leading edge of the shoulder-mounted wing was swept back at an angle of 43° and the wing itself was given a dihedral of 6°. Seven fuel tanks were housed in the two-spar wing and dive brakes were positioned on its upper surface. The main wheels of the tricycle landing gear retracted into the wings while the nose gear retracted into the lower part of the nose.

The Jumo 004 turbojet, captured from the Germans, had 8.8 kilonewtons (1,978 lb_{f}) of thrust. It was positioned in the aft fuselage, together with three additional fuel tanks, and used air provided by a prominent semi-circular ventral intake underneath the cockpit. Wind-tunnel testing showed that it was not as effective as had been hoped, although the airframe was deemed capable of reaching a speed of 900 km/h (560 mph) and Mach 0.9 in a shallow dive given enough thrust.

== Construction and flight testing ==
Construction of the aircraft was completed in 1947 and it had begun taxiing tests in October, but wind-tunnel testing revealed some potential aerodynamic problems that delayed its first flight by over six months. It finally flew on 23 June 1948 and achieved a speed of 800 km/h (500 mph) despite its unreliable engine. The program was cancelled in early 1949 after only five flights as the engine's lack of thrust imposed tight limits on the types of test flying that it could do and Arsenal had refocused on the follow-on VG 90 carrier-based fighter.

== Variants ==
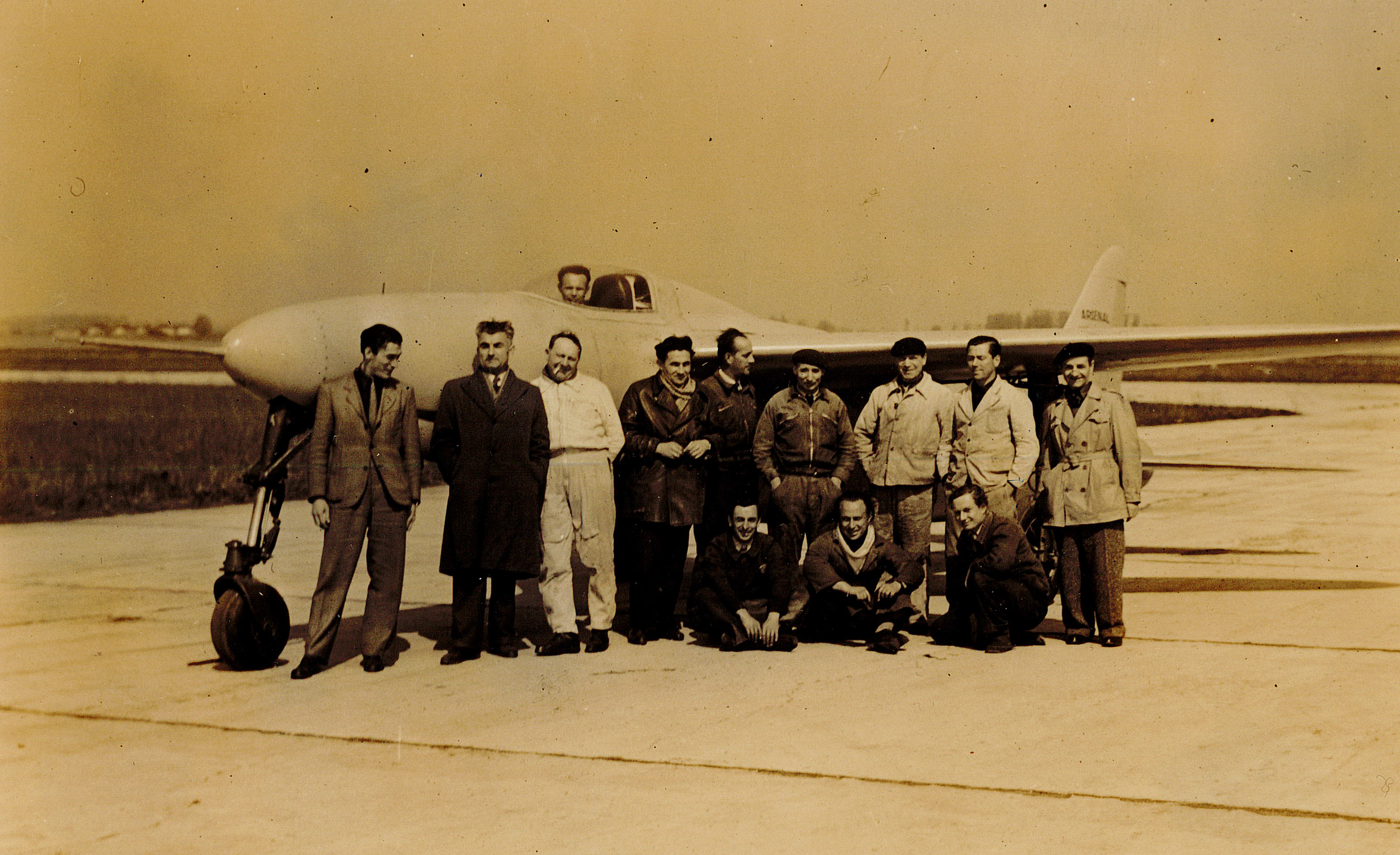
Engineers and technicians surrounding prototype Arsenal VG.70.01

VG 70

Research aircraft powered by a Jumo 004 turbojet, one built

VG 71

Research aircraft with a Rolls-Royce Derwent 5 turbojet, proposal only.

VG 80

Carrier-based fighter aircraft powered by a Rolls-Royce Nene turbojet, never built, but developed into the VG 90.

== Specifications ==
Data from X-Planes of Europe: Secret Research Aircraft From the Golden Age 1946–1974

General characteristics

- Crew: 1
- Length: 9.7 m (31 ft 10 in)
- Wingspan: 9.1 m (29 ft 10 in)
- Wing area: 17 m^{2} (180 sq ft)
- Max takeoff weight: 3,300 kg (7,275 lb)
- Powerplant: 1 × Junkers Jumo 004B-2 axial-flow turbojet, 8.8 kN (1,980 lbf) thrust

Performance

- Maximum speed: 800 km/h (500 mph, 430 kn)

== See also ==
Aircraft of comparable role, configuration, and era

- de Havilland DH 108
- Sud-Ouest Triton

== Bibliography ==
- Buttler, Tony & Delezenne, Jean-Louis (2012). X-Planes of Europe: Secret Research Aircraft from the Golden Age 1946-1974. Manchester, UK: Hikoki Publications. ISBN 978-1-902-10921-3.
- Carbonel, Jean-Christophe (2016). French Secret Projects. Vol. 1: Post War Fighters. Manchester, UK: Crecy Publishing. ISBN 978-1-91080-900-6.
