= Arsenal VB 10 =

French heavy fighter aircraft developed in 1945

VB 10
- The first production VB 10

General information
- Type: Fighter; Interceptor
- Manufacturer: Arsenal de l'Aéronautique
- Designer: Michel Vernisse and M Badie
- Number built: 6

History
- First flight: 7 July 1945

The Arsenal VB 10 was a French fighter-interceptor aircraft developed during and shortly after World War II. It was a low-wing monoplane with retractable tailwheel undercarriage and of largely orthodox configuration. The ultimate product of a design that began with the Arsenal VG 10 prior to the war, the VB 10 added a second engine behind the cockpit which drove a second propeller, coaxial with and contra-rotating to the propeller driven by the engine in the nose.

In January 1937 Arsenal were given a contract to develop a twin-engined heavy interceptor built from wood, powered by two 590 hp Hispano-Suiza 12X engines mounted in tandem inside the fuselage, driving co-axial propellers in the nose. Work on the VG 10 was abandoned in June 1937 in favour of the VG 20, which was essentially similar but powered by two 900 hp Hispano-Suiza 12Y engines. The VG 20 was abandoned in turn in January 1938, but the design work and studies were used for the design of the all-metal VB 10. For research in the development of the VG 10 and VG 20, Arsenal designed and built the VG 30 powered by a single 690 hp Hispano-Suiza 12X engine, which in turn led to the high-performance fighter prototypes of the VG 30 series.

Although the aircraft was first designed, and ordered, in 1940, little progress was made during France's occupation, and the prototype did not fly until after VE day. By then, it was already apparent that the future of the fighter lay with jet power, but development of the VB 10 continued as a safety net for France's nascent jet fighter programmes. In December 1945, a contract for 200 machines was placed by the French government, the first of which flew on 3 November 1947. By the time the fourth had been delivered in September 1948, the entire order was cancelled, with the French Air Force relying on surplus British and American fighters to tide it over until domestically produced jet fighters appeared shortly thereafter.

== Specifications (production version) ==
Data from Jane's all the World's Aircraft 1947, Les Avions Francais de 1944 a 1964, The Complete Book of Fighters

General characteristics

- Crew: 1
- Length: 12.98 m (42 ft 7 in)
- Wingspan: 15.49 m (50 ft 10 in)
- Height: 5.2 m (17 ft 1 in)
- Wing area: 35.5 m^{2} (382 sq ft)
- Empty weight: 6,230 kg (13,735 lb)
- Gross weight: 9,523 kg (20,995 lb)
- Powerplant: 1 × Hispano-Suiza 12Zars-15 V-12 liquid-cooled piston engine, 860 kW (1,150 hp)
- Powerplant: 1 × Hispano-Suiza 12Zars-16 V-12 liquid-cooled piston engine, 860 kW (1,150 hp)
- Propellers: 6-bladed co-axial contra-rotating constant speed propeller (3 blades each)

Performance

- Maximum speed: 700 km/h (430 mph, 380 kn) at 7,500 m (24,600 ft)
- Range: 1,700 km (1,100 mi, 920 nmi)
- Ferry range: 2,600 km (1,600 mi, 1,400 nmi)
- Service ceiling: 11,000 m (36,000 ft)
- Rate of climb: 10.2 m/s (2,010 ft/min)

Armament

- Guns: 4 Hispano Suiza HS.404 cannon (second prototype + 6x 0.5in machine-guns)
- Rockets: 4 rockets under the outer wings
- Bombs: 2 500 kg (1,100 lb) bombs on wing pylons

== See also ==
Aircraft of comparable role, configuration, and era

- Kawasaki Ki-64
- Yokosuka R2Y
- Bell P-39 Airacobra
- Bell P-63 Kingcobra
- Messerschmitt Me 509
- Koolhoven F.K.55
- Fisher P-75 Eagle

Related lists

- List of fighter aircraft

== Bibliography ==
- Buttler, Tony (2015). X-Planes of Europe. Vol. II: Military Prototype Aircraft from the Golden Age 1946–1974. Manchester, UK: Hikoki Publications. ISBN 978-1-90210-948-0.
- Carbonel, Jean-Christophe (2016). French Secret Projects. Vol. 1: Post War Fighters. Manchester, UK: Crecy Publishing. ISBN 978-1-91080-900-6.
- Marchand, Alain & Bénichou, Marcel (May 1990). "Le VB.10: le temps des illusions (1)" [The VB.10: The Time of Illusions, Part 1]. Le Fana de l'Aviation (in French) (246): 12–28. ISSN 0757-4169.
- Marchand, Alain & Bénichou, Marcel (June 1990). "Le VB.10: le temps des illusions (1)" [The VB.10: The Time of Illusions, Part 2]. Le Fana de l'Aviation (in French) (247): 40–43. ISSN 0757-4169.
- Taylor, Michael J. H. (1989). Jane's Encyclopedia of Aviation. London: Studio Editions. p. 81.
