= Arsenal VG 90 =

French prototype jet airplane

VG 90
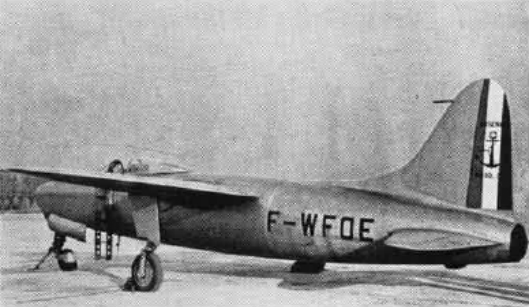

General information
- Type: Prototype carrier-based interceptor
- Manufacturer: Arsenal de l'Aéronautique
- Status: Cancelled
- Number built: 2

History
- First flight: 27 September 1949

The Arsenal VG 90 was a French carrier-based jet-engined interceptor developed in the late 1940s. It was intended to compete for an Aéronavale (French Naval Aviation) contract and first flew in 1949. It set a speed record for a French aircraft the following year, but both of the completed prototypes were destroyed in fatal crashes and the program was cancelled in 1952 before the third prototype was finished. The Aéronavale contract was eventually awarded to a license-built British aircraft. The remains of the last VG 90 were scrapped in 1978.

== Development and description ==
After the end of World War II, Aéronavale had only two small aircraft carriers: Dixmude, which was loaned by the Americans, and Arromanches, which had been leased from the British, but planned to lay down its own larger PA-28 design in 1947. All of its aircraft were piston-engined and had been rendered obsolete by the advent of jet-propelled aircraft during the war. The French lacked an indigenous turbojet design and licensed the British Rolls-Royce Nene to facilitate their development of jet-propelled aircraft. Aéronavale issued a requirement for a jet-powered interceptor on 29 March 1946 and then issued a request for proposal on 8 June. The aircraft had to exceed a speed of 900 km/h (559 mph) at all altitudes, have a climb rate in excess of 25 m/s (82 ft/s) at sea level, and an armament of three 30-millimeter (1.2 in) autocannon with the possibility of carrying bombs or unguided air-to-ground rockets. Arsenal de l'Aéronautique's proposal was derived from its earlier VG 70 research aircraft and its related VG 80 carrier-based fighter proposal. The SNCAC NC 1080 and Nord 2200 were the other competitors for the contract for 90 aircraft.

The single-seat VG 90 had a semi-monocoque all-metal fuselage and was fitted with tricycle landing gear. The leading edge of the shoulder-mounted wing was swept back at an angle of 25° and the wing itself was given a dihedral of 4°. Three fuel tanks were housed in the fuselage with a total capacity of 2,080 liters (458 imp gal; 549 U.S. gal) and each wing was provided with three additional fuel tanks between the two spars; the total capacity of the wing tanks was 720 liters (158 imp gal; 190 U.S. gal). The skins of the wings and tailplane of the first prototype were made from birch plywood, but those of later prototypes were metal. Dive brakes were fitted on the upper and lower surfaces of the folding wings. Air for the license-built 22.2-kilonewton (5,000 lb_{f}) Nene 102 engine was provided by side-mounted intakes below the wings' leading edge. The entire aft fuselage could be removed to allow access to the engine. The cockpit was armored and the pilot was provided with an ejection seat.

The VG 90's armament was intended to consist of three 30 mm Hispano-Suiza HS.602 autocannon mounted in the center portion of the wing, but Arsenal investigated replacing them with four or six 20 mm (0.8 in) cannon. A radar was intended to be fitted in the nose and four hardpoints were going to be fitted under the center wing section for drop tanks, bombs or rockets.

== Construction and flight testing ==
Design work on the first prototype began in October 1946 and construction began fifteen months later. The aircraft was completed in May 1949 and ground testing began the following month at Melun-Villaroche airfield, although it did not make its first flight until 27 September. This revealed problems with the air intake ducts and the ailerons and rectifying those issue delayed the next flight until December. On the third flight, the dive brakes unilaterally extended and their shape had to be modified to prevent a recurrence. Further flights were uneventful and the prototype was flown to Brétigny-sur-Orge to be evaluated by the test pilots of the Centre d'essais en vol ((CEV) French Flight-testing Center) on 10 May 1950. Initial evaluations were favorable although the pilots complained that forward visibility while landing was poor and that it was difficult to prevent the aft fuselage from striking the ground. During this time, the aircraft reached a speed of Mach 0.845 between 5,000 and 6,000 m (16,404 and 19,685 ft), the highest speed yet attained by a French aircraft. Pilot Pierre Decroo was killed on 25 May while making a high-speed pass before coming in to land when pieces of the airframe broke away, causing the aircraft to roll seven times before ploughing into the ground. Flight-data instruments recorded about 15 violent oscillations. The crash investigation concluded that the dive brakes had again spontaneously opened and the high velocity caused them to be torn away, striking the tailplane and sending the aircraft out of control.

Work continued on the second prototype which had a larger vertical stabilizer with a split rudder, enlarged air intakes, modified landing gear, powered controls and a revised dive-brake installation. The aircraft made its first flight in June 1951. After the preliminary tests had been completed, pilot Claude Dellys flew the aircraft to begin its evaluation at CEV on 21 February 1952. It crashed en route after he reported experiencing some turbulence that was unnoticed by the chase plane. Dellys died in the crash because his ejection seat malfunctioned and did not fire because of frozen hydraulic fluid. The accident investigation concluded that the recent removal of some balancing weights in the horizontal stabilizers when the power controls were installed caused aerodynamic flutter that tore off the tail of the aircraft.

The third prototype was intended to be built to production standard as the first VG 91. The VG 90s had been found to be underpowered and the aircraft was to be fitted with a 27.9 kN (6,300 lb_{f}) SNECMA Atar 101C engine to improve upon their performance. It was also going to be equipped with a thinner wing and the intended armament installed. All further work was cancelled after the second crash and a license-built version of the British de Havilland Sea Venom was ultimately selected to satisfy Aéronavale's requirement. The incomplete aircraft was tested in the ONERA full-scale wind tunnel at Modane to discover the cause of the flutter. Many years later, it was discovered in the scrapyard at Cazaux Air Base, but could not be restored and was scrapped in July 1978.

== Variants ==
VG 90

Carrier-based fighter with a Rolls-Royce Nene turbojet, two completed.

VG 91

Production version of the VG 90 with a SNECMA Atar 101 turbojet, one built, but not completed.

VG 92

Land-based version of the VG 90 without folding wings and arrestor hook, project only.

VG 93

VG 90 fitted with wingtip ramjets, project only.

VG 94

VG 92 fitted with an afterburner, project only.

== Operators ==
France

== Specifications ==
Data from X-Planes of Europe II: Military Prototype Aircraft from the Golden Age 1945–1974

General characteristics

- Crew: 1
- Length: 13.44 m (44 ft 1 in)
- Wingspan: 12.6 m (41 ft 4 in)
- Wing area: 30.7 m^{2} (330 sq ft)
- Gross weight: 8,719 kg (19,222 lb)
- Fuel capacity: 2,800 liters (616 imp gal; 740 U.S. gal)
- Powerplant: 1 × Rolls-Royce Nene 102 centrifugal-flow turbojet engine, 22.2 kN (5,000 lbf) thrust

Performance

- Maximum speed: 855 km/h (531 mph, 462 kn)
- Maximum speed: Mach 0.845
- Service ceiling: 12,000 m (39,000 ft)
- Rate of climb: 15.00 m/s (2,953 ft/min)

Armament

- 3 × 30 mm (1.2 in) autocannon (intended)

== See also ==
Aircraft of comparable role, configuration, and era

- Hawker P.1052
- Hawker Sea Hawk
- McDonnell FH Phantom
- North American FJ-1 Fury
- Supermarine Attacker

Related lists

- List of fighter aircraft
