= Nord 2200 =

French prototype carrier-based interceptor

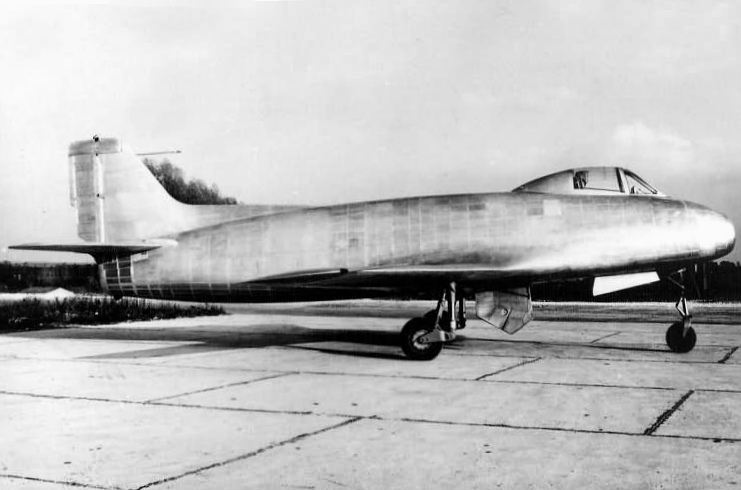

General information
- Type: Carrier-based interceptor
- National origin: France
- Manufacturer: Nord Aviation
- Status: Cancelled
- Number built: 1

History
- First flight: 16 December 1949

The Nord 2200 was a French carrier-based, jet-engined interceptor developed in the late 1940s. It was intended to compete for an Aéronavale (French Naval Aviation) contract, but was not selected for production after a 1950 accident badly damaged the sole prototype. It was repaired and resumed flight testing the following year, which including evaluating rocket-assisted take offs. After the aircraft made its last flight in 1954, it was used as a gunnery target. Much of the airframe was recovered in the 1980s, but its current disposition is uncertain.

== Development and description ==
After the end of World War II, Aéronavale had only two small aircraft carriers: Dixmude, which was loaned by the Americans, and Arromanches, which had been leased from the British, but planned to lay down its own larger PA-28 design in 1947. All of its aircraft were piston-engined and had been rendered obsolete by the advent of jet-propelled aircraft during the war. The French lacked an indigenous turbojet design and licensed the British Rolls-Royce Nene to facilitate their development of jet-propelled aircraft. Aéronavale issued a requirement for a jet-powered interceptor on 29 March 1946 and then issued a request for proposals on 8 June. The aircraft had to exceed a speed of 900 km/h (559 mph) at all altitudes, have a climb rate in excess of 25 m/s (82 ft/s) at sea level, and an armament of three 30-millimeter (1.2 in) autocannon with the possibility of carrying bombs or unguided air-to-ground rockets. The SNCAC NC 1080 and Arsenal VG 90 were the other competitors for the contract for 90 aircraft.

The single-seat Nord Aviation 2200 had a low-mounted two-spar wing that was swept back at an angle of 24°. Its fuselage was built in three sections and the fuel tanks were housed in the center section with a total capacity of 2,160 liters (475 imp gal; 571 U.S. gal). It was fitted with tricycle landing gear and provision was made for an arrestor hook. Dive brakes were fitted on the lower surfaces of the non-folding wings and it was equipped with an all-moving horizontal stabilizer. Air for the license-built 22.2-kilonewton (5,000 lb_{f}) Nene 102 engine was provided by an oval intake in the nose. The entire aft fuselage could be removed to allow access to the engine. The cockpit was armored and the pilot was provided with an ejection seat.

The prototype was unarmed, but Nord intended production aircraft to be armed with the required three 30 mm autocannon, albeit with 150 rounds per gun rather than the full 200 even though the location for the guns had not yet been decided. Nord also investigated changing the armament to four 20 mm (0.8 in) autocannon. The aircraft was also supposed to be able to carry bombs up to 500 kg (1,100 lb) in size as well as rocket pods under the wings and a 950-litre (210 imp gal; 250 US gal) drop tank underneath the fuselage.

== Construction and flight testing ==
Design work on the 2200 began in early 1946 and the company submitted its proposal on 16 October. A contract for one prototype followed on 27 December. It was completed behind schedule and did not begin taxiing trials until 10 November 1949. Its maiden flight followed on 16 December and flight testing was generally satisfactory. The aircraft was flown to Brétigny-sur-Orge Air Base on 3 April 1950 to begin its official trials at the Air Force's Centre d'essais en vol (Flight-testing Center). The test pilots evaluated the Nord 2200 as having very good flying and handling qualities, although it was underpowered and was only able to reach 815 km/h (506 mph) and Mach 0.83. Its dive brakes proved to be completely ineffective and it did have some bad stall characteristics at certain weights.

The prototype was displayed at the Paris Air Show on 11 June and caught on fire during take off on the 24th after the cap for one of the fuel tanks had been left off and kerosene spilled into the air intake. The pilot was able to abort the take off and the aircraft was repaired so it could continue flight testing. Nord took advantage of the opportunity to move the dive brakes to the rear fuselage, install servo controls, enlarge the vertical stabilizer and add a "lip" above the air intake to house a small radar. The work took almost a year and effectively ensured that the 2200 did not win the competition; a license-built version of the British de Havilland Sea Venom was ultimately selected to satisfy Aéronavale's requirement. The company received a contract during this time to evaluate replacing the Nene engine with a 28 kN (6,300 lb_{f}) Rolls-Royce RB.44 Tay engine, but this remained a study only.

The prototype did not fly again until 24 May 1951 and was flown intensively until 11 July when it was put into storage for most of the rest of the year. Intermittent flights resumed in December and the aircraft made its 100th flight on 25 February 1953. In June it began to be used to test rocket-assisted take offs using two rockets installed underneath the fuselage. The following month it demonstrated them at the Paris Air Show, but it only made occasional flights afterwards. The aircraft flew for the last time on 16 June 1954 and became a gunnery target at Bourges after its engine and most of its equipment was removed. The surviving portions of the airframe were recovered in the 1980s and stored at the Musée aéronautique de Vannes - Monterblanc. That museum closed in 2014 and its collection was supposed to be distributed to other French museums, but no information about the current disposition of the prototype is available.

== Specifications (as completed) ==
Data from X-Planes of Europe II: Military Prototype Aircraft from the Golden Age 1945–1974

General characteristics

- Crew: 1
- Length: 13 m (42 ft 8 in)
- Wingspan: 12 m (39 ft 4 in)
- Wing area: 31.6 m^{2} (340 sq ft)
- Gross weight: 6,960 kg (15,344 lb)
- Fuel capacity: 2,160 liters (475 imp gal; 571 U.S. gal)
- Powerplant: 1 × Rolls-Royce Nene 102 centrifugal-flow turbojet engine, 22.2 kN (5,000 lbf) thrust

Performance

- Maximum speed: 815 km/h (506 mph, 440 kn) (achieved)
- Maximum speed: Mach 0.83
- Rate of climb: 15.00 m/s (2,953 ft/min)

Armament

- Guns: 3 × 30 mm (1.2 in) autocannon with 150 rounds per gun

== See also ==
Aircraft of comparable role, configuration, and era

- Hawker P.1052
- Hawker Sea Hawk
- McDonnell FH Phantom
- North American FJ-1 Fury
- Supermarine Attacker

Related lists

- List of fighter aircraft

== Bibliography ==
- Buttler, Tony (2015). X-Planes of Europe. Vol. II: Military Prototype Aircraft from the Golden Age 1945–1974. Manchester, UK: Hikoki Publications. ISBN 978-1-90210-948-0.
- Carbonel, Jean-Christophe (2016). French Secret Projects. Vol. 1: Post War Fighters. Manchester, UK: Crecy Publishing. ISBN 978-1-91080-900-6.
- Gaillard, Pierre (April 1995). "Les trois premiers chasseurs embarqués à réaction français, 1 — Le NC 1080" [The First Three French Carrier Jet Fighters, 1 — The NC 1080]. Le Fana de l'Aviation (in French) (305): 12–19. ISSN 0757-4169.
- Gaillard, Pierre (June 1995). "Les trois premiers chasseurs embarqués à réaction français, 3 — Le Nord 2000" [The First Three French Carrier Jet Fighters 3 — The Nord 2200]. Le Fana de l'Aviation (in French) (307): 40–46. ISSN 0757-4169.
