= SNCAC NC 1080 =

Prototype carrier-based fighter aircraft

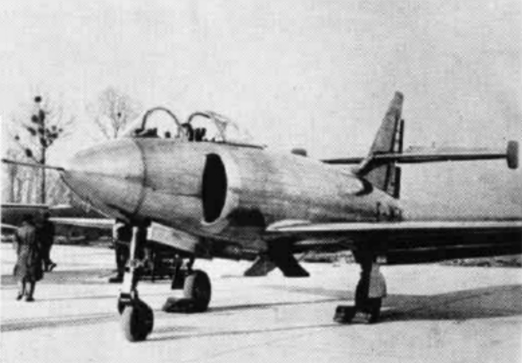
- The prototype of the NC.1080 in 1950

General information
- Type: Interceptor
- National origin: France
- Manufacturer: SNCAC (Société Nationale de Constructions Aéronautiques du Centre)
- Status: Cancelled
- Number built: 1

History
- First flight: 29 July 1949

The SNCAC NC 1080 was a French jet-engined interceptor developed in the late 1940s by SNCAC for use aboard aircraft carriers. It was intended to compete for an Aéronavale (French Naval Aviation) contract and first flew in 1949. The aircraft used an innovative system of flight control surfaces that proved to be a failure during flight testing and had to be modified before it could fly again. Its development was troubled by other design flaws and the company's merger with SNCAN that same year. Further development was cancelled after a fatal crash destroyed the sole prototype in 1950.

== Development and description ==
After the end of World War II, Aéronavale had only two small aircraft carriers: Dixmude, which was loaned by the Americans, and Arromanches, which had been leased from the British, but planned to lay down its own larger PA-28 design in 1947. All of its aircraft were piston-engined and had been rendered obsolete by the advent of jet-propelled aircraft during the war. The French lacked an indigenous turbojet design and licensed the British Rolls-Royce Nene to facilitate their development of jet-propelled aircraft. Aéronavale issued a requirement for a jet-powered interceptor on 29 March 1946 and then issued a request for proposals on 8 June. The aircraft had to exceed a speed of 900 km/h (559 mph) at all altitudes, have a climb rate in excess of 25 m/s (82 ft/s) at sea level, and an armament of three 30-millimeter (1.2 in) autocannon with the possibility of carrying bombs or unguided air-to-ground rockets. The Nord 2200 and Arsenal VG 90 were the other competitors for the contract for 90 aircraft.

The single-seat SNCAC NC 1080 had a low-mounted single-spar wing that was swept back at an angle of 22° 30'. Its circular-section fuselage was built in two parts and the fuel tank was housed in the forward section with a total capacity of 1,950 liters (429 imp gal; 515 U.S. gal). It was fitted with a radar in the nose, tricycle landing gear and folding wings. Air for the 22.2-kilonewton (5,000 lb_{f}) Nene 102 engine was provided by semi-elliptical intakes on the sides of the fuselage and used boundary layer suction to smooth the airflow. Most unusually, the aircraft lacked ailerons and lateral control was intended to be provided by "compensators", combination double-slotted and blown flaps designed by Pierre-Marcel Lemoigne, and spoilers in the wings; the spoilers were also intended to act as dive brakes when deployed below the wings. The entire aft fuselage could be removed to allow access to the engine. The cockpit was armored and the pilot was provided with an ejection seat.

== Construction and flight testing ==
Aéronavale awarded SNCAC a contract on 31 December 1946, but cancelled it two years later under budgetary constraints. The company decided to continue work at its own expense, still hoping for a production order. The prototype was completed in March 1949 with temporary fixed landing gear and it was trucked to Toussus-le-Noble Airport, but flight testing was delayed by the late delivery of the retractable landing gear. Taxiing trials began on 23 June and a few short hops were made during high-speed taxiing two days later. These revealed problems with lateral stability which caused the aircraft's vertical stabilizer and rudder to be heightened and small plates to be added at the wingtips.

While these modifications were being made, SNCAC went bankrupt in July and merged with SNCAN (later Nord Aviation). The NC 1080 made its official maiden flight on 29 July from the airfield at Melun Villaroche while its fate was being decided. The flight demonstrated that the wind-tunnel testing of the prototype's novel control surfaces had been grossly inadequate as the spoilers and compensators were almost entirely useless and it was still only marginally stable laterally. The test pilot found the aircraft almost impossible to turn, but was able to land at Brétigny-sur-Orge Air Base after eight minutes of flight only because it was almost straight ahead from Melun Villaroche. SNCAN considered terminating the program after the flight, flying its own competitor for the requirement, but it was awarded a contract by Aéronavale later that year to continue development.

SNCAN's engineers replaced the spoilers with ailerons and moved the wingtip plates to the tips of the horizontal stabilizers. The prototype was flown back to Melun Villaroche on 16 December and it resumed flight testing in January 1950. The following month servomotors were installed to boost the aileron controls and the boundary layer suction system was removed. The manufacturer's trials were completed in March after 19 more flights and the aircraft was flown back to Brétigny-sur-Orge on 31 March to begin its official trials at the Centre d'essais en vol (Flight Test Center). It reached a speed of 720 km/h (450 mph) and a speed of Mach 0.64 in a dive during flights on 6 April. The following day the NC 1080 entered a spin at an altitude of 3,000 m (9,800 ft), had its anti-spin parachute torn away, and crashed, killing the pilot, Pierre Gallay. Witnesses saw pieces fly off the aircraft, but the subsequent investigation was unable to determine why it crashed. Without another prototype available to continue development, the program was cancelled and a license-built version of the British de Havilland Sea Venom was ultimately selected to satisfy Aéronavale's requirement.

== Specifications ==
Data from X-Planes of Europe II: Military Prototype Aircraft from the Golden Age 1945–1974

General characteristics

- Crew: 1
- Length: 12.87 m (42 ft 3 in)
- Wingspan: 12 m (39 ft 4 in)
- Wing area: 28.4 m^{2} (306 sq ft)
- Gross weight: 7,800 kg (17,196 lb)
- Fuel capacity: 1,950 liters (429 imp gal; 515 U.S. gal)
- Powerplant: 1 × Rolls-Royce Nene 102 centrifugal-flow turbojet engine, 22.2 kN (5,000 lbf) thrust

Performance

- Maximum speed: 977 km/h (607 mph, 528 kn) at 5,000 m (16,000 ft) (designed)
- Maximum speed: Mach 0.85
- Range: 1,300 km (810 mi, 700 nmi) (designed)
- Service ceiling: 12,700 m (41,700 ft) (estimated)
- Rate of climb: 28 m/s (5,500 ft/min) at sea level (intended)
- Time to altitude: 11 minutes, 20 seconds to 9,000 m (30,000 ft)

Armament

- Guns: 3 × 30 mm (1.2 in) autocannon (planned)

== See also ==
Aircraft of comparable role, configuration, and era

- Hawker P.1052 – (United Kingdom)
- Hawker Sea Hawk – (United Kingdom)
- McDonnell FH Phantom – (United States)
- North American FJ-1 Fury – (United States)
- Supermarine Attacker – (United Kingdom)

Related lists

- List of fighter aircraft

== Bibliography ==
- Buttler, Tony. X-Planes of Europe II: Military Prototype Aircraft from the Golden Age 1946–1974. Manchester, UK: Hikoki Publications, 2015. ISBN 978-1-90210-948-0
- Carbonel, Jean-Christophe. French Secret Projects 1: Post War Fighters. Manchester, UK: Crecy Publishing, 2016 ISBN 978-1-91080-900-6
- Gaillard, Pierre (April 1995). "Les trois premiers chasseurs embarqués à réaction français, 1 — Le NC 1080" [The First Three French Carrier Jet Fighters, 1 — The NC 1080]. Le Fana de l'Aviation (in French) (305): 12–19. ISSN 0757-4169.
