= Arsenal O.101 =

O.101

General information
- Type: Research aircraft
- Manufacturer: Arsenal de l'Aéronautique
- Number built: 1

History
- First flight: 10 October 1947

The Arsenal O.101 was a French research aircraft that flew shortly after World War II. It was a low-wing monoplane of conventional configuration with fixed tailwheel undercarriage, but incorporated several novel features for its role as an airborne testbed for evaluating airfoil sections and control surface designs. It was designed to accommodate a pilot and an observer in tandem cockpits. However, since the observer was to be watching the aircraft's wings, this cockpit was sunken fully into the fuselage, affording no fore-and-aft view at all. The pilot's cockpit was set well back along the fuselage, near the tail.

The O.101 was fitted with extensive instrumentation to measure pressures and loads throughout the aircraft, and was given dimensions such that the entire aircraft could be placed inside the wind tunnel at Chalais-Meudon without any disassembly required.

== Specifications ==
General characteristics

- Crew: two, pilot and observer
- Length: 7.60 m (25 ft 0 in)
- Wingspan: 8.25 m (27 ft 1 in)
- Height: 3.20 m (10 ft 6 in)
- Wing area: 8.8 m^{2} (95 sq ft)
- Gross weight: 1,730 kg (3,810 lb)
- Powerplant: 1 × Renault 12S piston engine , 370 kW (495 hp)

Performance

- Maximum speed: 450 km/h (280 mph, 240 kn)
- Service ceiling: 8,000 m (26,200 ft)
