= Arsenal Air 100 =

Single-seat French glider, 1947

Air 100
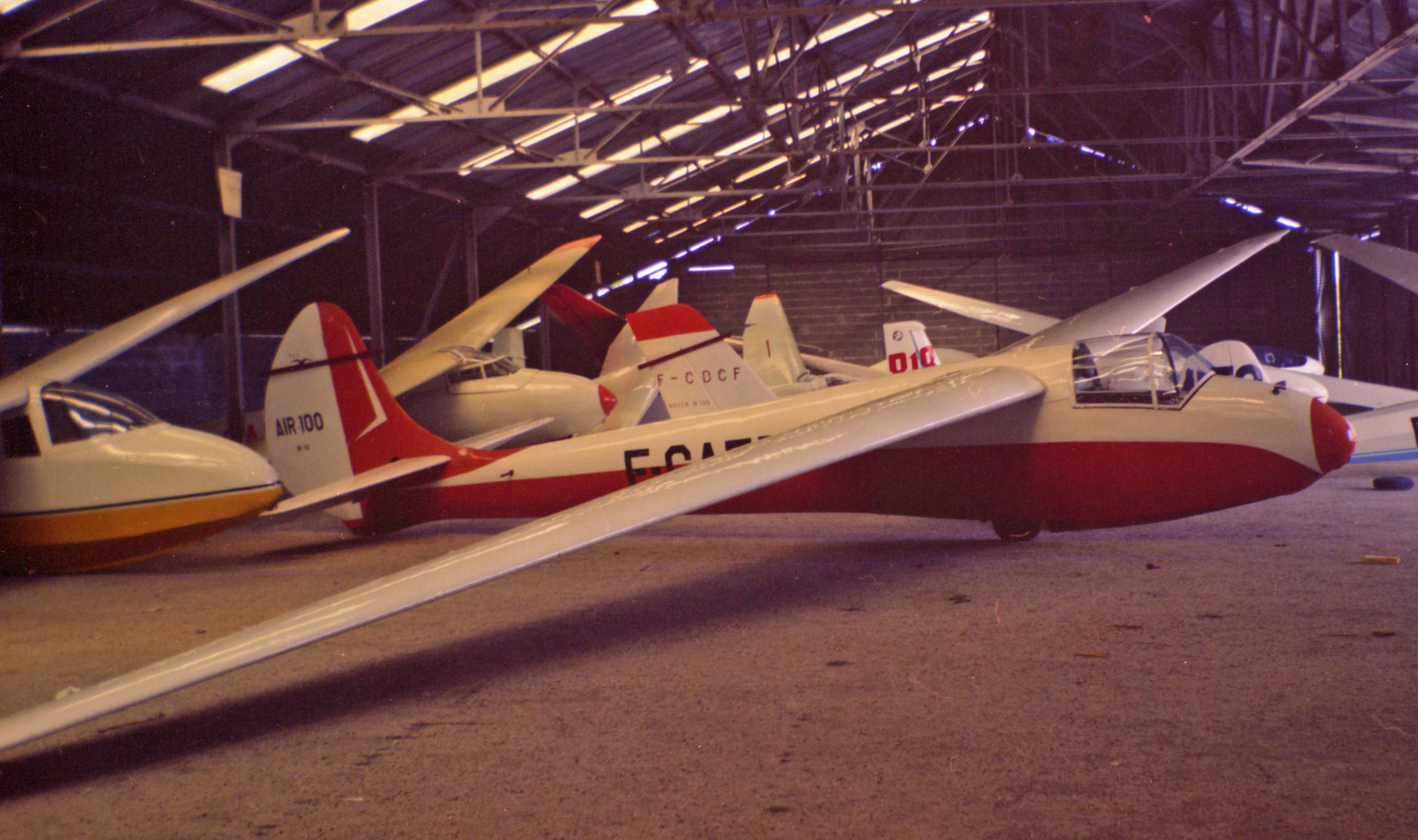

General information
- Type: Single seat sailplane
- National origin: France
- Manufacturer: Arsenal de l'Aéronautique (Arsenal)
- Designer: Raymond Jarlaud
- Number built: 43

History
- First flight: 10 June 1947

The Arsenal Air 100 is a French single seat competition sailplane produced in the 1940s. It sold in small numbers but set several records, still holding the world absolute solo glider endurance record of 56 h 15 m.

== Design and development ==
The successful German Jacobs Weihe sailplane of 1938 strongly influenced several wartime and postwar designs such as the Italian CVV-6 Canguro and the British Slingsby Gull 4 and Sky. The Arsenal 100 was also Weihe based, with the intention of improving on that design. Work began before the war within a small design group named the Groupe de l'Air, led by Raymond Jarlaud.

The wings of the two aircraft are similar in design and construction. Both have spans of 18.0 m (59 ft 1 in) and are straight tapered with rounded wing tips, although the Air's taper ratio (wing root chord to tip chord) is higher, resulting a slightly greater aspect ratio. Some later Air 100s have squared-off tips terminated in streamlined "salmons". Both wings use the Göttingen 549 airfoil inboard of the tips, though the Air's roots have a thickened version. They are wooden single spar structures, plywood covered ahead of the spar and fabric covered behind. The Air 100 has slotted ailerons to improve roll rates and, inboard, has Schempp-Hirth parallel-rule airbrakes mounted immediately aft of the main spar; the Weihe's DFS style brakes had never been very effective, largely because their design placed them further aft on the wing where space did not allow them to open fully.

The tail units of the two types are also similar, with ply covered fixed surfaces and fabric covered control surfaces. The Air 100 has a broader chord fin and there are detailed differences in shape, but both place a broad, curved rudder on a hinge roughly in line with the elevator trailing edge. There are significant differences in the fuselages, though both are rounded, ply covered structures. The Weihe has a relatively slender rear fuselage, achieved by placing the wing high on a pylon behind the cockpit. In order to improve the aerodynamics of the wing-fuselage junction the Air's designers deepened the fuselage and mounted the wing at shoulder height. The prototype had no dihedral but this is used on production aircraft. The cockpit canopy is higher, more curved and with fewer frames on the post-war design. Originally the Air 100 landed on a skid and tail bumper but on production aircraft there is a fixed monowheel under mid-chord, with the rear part of the skid removed.

The Air 100 flew for the first time on 10 June 1947. The production aircraft that followed the two prototypes were 43 kg (95 ) heavier empty.

== Operational history ==
The Air 100 made its debut in competition gliding when the two prototypes, recently completed at the Châtillon Air Arsenal and after only 3 h flight testing, flew in the American National Championships held at Wichita Falls, Texas, in July 1947. They came in fifth and eighth.

In 1948, Donald Pollard flew 206 miles (332 km) from Elmira, NY to Asbury Park, NJ to win the Barringer Trophy in his Air 100. The type's most enduring achievement was made in 1952 when it set a new solo world duration record of 56 h 15 min. The pilot was Charles Atger. The record was set on 2–4 April at Saint-Rémy-de-Provence, ridge sailing an Air 100 over the Chaine des Alpilles in the northern Mistral wind. Thirty months later another pilot, Bertrand Dauvin (21), in a different sailplane, was killed attempting to improve on Atger's record; the crash was attributed to pilot exhaustion and the FAI rejected further duration record claims for gliders. Thus Atger's record still stands and he was alive to celebrate its 40th anniversary.

A new women's out and return world distance record was set on 12 May 1953 by Marcelle Choisnet with a 290 km (180 mi) flight from Beynes via Romilly-sur-Seine. She also set a declared goal women's record of 510 km (320 mi) in May 1954 in an Air 102.

The Airs set other records and were competing successfully in France throughout the early 1950s. Some remained active much longer: three Air 100s and two Air 102s remained on the European civil aircraft registers in 2010, though one of the latter was dismantled.

== Variants ==
From Sailplanes 1945-1965

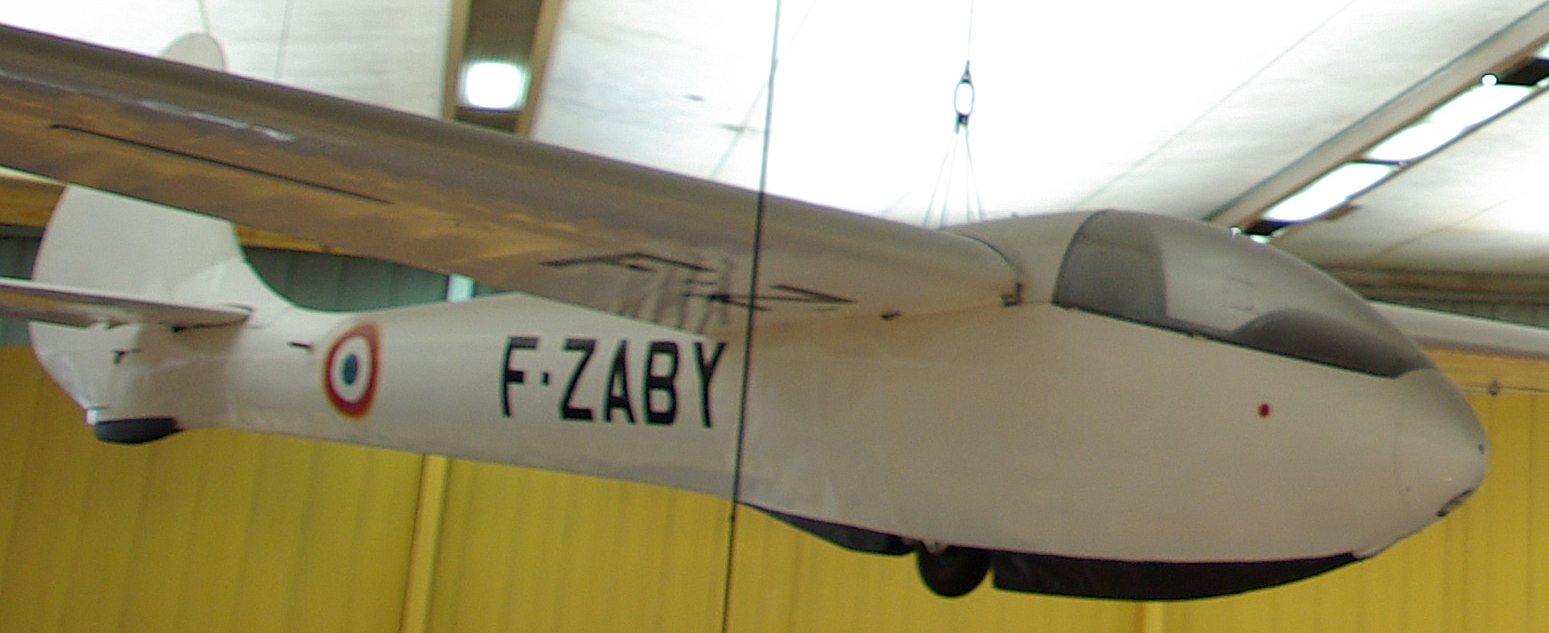
Air 101 musée de l'Air et de l'Espace. Le Bourget-Paris (France)

Air 100
Two prototypes followed by 15 production aircraft by Victor Minié Aviation.
Air 101
One built or modified by Groupe de l'Air, the original design team.
Air 102
Stiffened structure. 25 built by Victor Minié in 1952.

== Aircraft on display ==
From: Aviation museums and collections of mainland Europe

Of the many Air 100s and 102s in store and collections, the following are on public display at:

- Musée de l'Air et de l'Espace, Le Bourget, Air 100: painted as F-ZABY (Note: This may be an Air 100 modified by the Groupe de l'Air into the sole Air 101 - see Variants)
- Musée Régional de l'Air, Marcé, Air 102: F-CAGQ

== Specifications (Air 100) ==
Data from Sailplanes 1945-1965. Weights and wingloading are for production Air 100, from Sailplane & Glider.

General characteristics

- Crew: 1
- Length: 8.02 m (26 ft 4 in)
- Wingspan: 18.00 m (59 ft 1 in)
- Wing area: 18.0 m^{2} (194 sq ft)
- Aspect ratio: 18
- Airfoil: Thickened Göttingen 549 at root, standard Göttingen 549 at mid-span, Göttingen 676 at tip
- Empty weight: 284 kg (627 lb)
- Gross weight: 374 kg (825 lb)

Performance

- Stall speed: 48 km/h (30 mph, 26 kn)
- Never exceed speed: 220 km/h (137 mph, 119 kn) prototype with airbrakes open
- Maximum glide ratio: 30:1 at 64 kilometres per hour (40 mph; 35 kn)
- Rate of sink: 0.6 m/s (120 ft/min) minimum, at 56 kilometres per hour (35 mph; 30 kn)
- Wing loading: 20.8 kg/m^{2} (4.26 lb/sq ft)
