= Nord Gerfaut =

1950s French supersonic research aircraft

Gerfaut
- The Nord 1402B Gerfaut IB taking off during the Paris Air Show, June 1956

General information
- Type: Delta-wing research aircraft
- National origin: France
- Manufacturer: Nord Aviation
- Designer: Jean Galtier
- Number built: 2

History
- First flight: 15 January 1954
- Retired: 1959

The Nord Gerfaut (Gyrfalcon) was a French delta-wing experimental research aircraft. It was the first European aircraft to exceed Mach 1 in level flight without the use of an afterburner. A pair of aircraft were built for the primary purpose of investigating the transonic regime. The Gerfaut I conducted its maiden flight in 1954; it was followed by the improved Gerfaut II two years later. Both aircraft were flown for several years for experimental purposes, being significantly upgraded over time. During the course of these test flights, the second prototype established multiple time-to-altitude world records. In the late 1950s, the type was used to flight-test various aerial missiles. Both aircraft performed their final flights in 1959; they were subsequently used as targets at the Military Test Range at Cazaux.

== Development and description ==
The Nord 1402 Gerfaut had its origin in a series of state-sponsored studies into delta and swept wings. To provide data for these studies Arsenal de l'Aéronautique (SFECMAS's nationalised predecessor, which was later merged with SNCAN to form Nord Aviation) built a wooden glider, the Arsenal 1301, that could be fitted with both delta and swept wings and with and without canards. Towed to the release point by SNCAC Martinet, Douglas DC-3 or SNCASE Languedoc transport aircraft, the glider provided valuable data for the design of the Gerfaut.

Based on this data SFECMAS's chief designer, Jean Galtier, initiated the 1400, 1500 and 1910 interceptor projects with delta wings and different types of propulsion systems. The 1400 developed into the Gerfaut series, the 1500 became the Nord Griffon, while the 1910, ambitiously specified with two large ramjet engines, was never pursued.

Different versions of the Arsenal / SFECMAS 1400 were studied:

- Arsenal 1401 powered by a combined ramjet / turbojet powerplant and high-set wings
- Arsenal 1402 powered by a ramjet with auxiliary Turbomeca turbojet, and middle-set wings
- Arsenal 1403 powered by a combined ramjet / turbojet powerplant and middle-set wings
- Arsenal 1404 powered by a combined ramjet / turbojet powerplant and low-set wings
- Arsenal 1405 powered by an ATAR 101 turbojet powerplant and low-set wings

The Ars 1402 design was the only one continued by SFECMAS, although it was heavily revised and the ramjet was discarded, to serve as a research aircraft. Galtier decided to minimize the development risk by keeping the 24-kilonewton (5,400 lb_{f}) SNECMA Atar 101C turbojet installation as simple as possible. He opted for a straight-through air duct to keep the air entering the engine as calm as possible and positioned the single-seat cockpit above the duct, giving the aircraft its characteristic hump-backed look. The air intake occupied the entire nose of the monocoque fuselage that was fitted with tricycle landing gear. The aircraft had thin delta wings and swept vertical tail surfaces with a small delta-shaped all-moving cruciform tail.

In late 1954, the aircraft was modified with a larger wing and a 28-kilonewton (6,300 lb_{f}) Atar 101D turbojet. In this configuration it was known as the 1402B Gerfaut IB. The earlier configuration was retrospectively designated as the 1402A Gerfaut IA.

== Operational history ==
The Gerfaut I first flew on 15 January 1954 and it became the first aircraft in Europe to exceed Mach 1 in level flight, without using afterburning, on 3 August. After this flight it was converted into the 1402B Gerfaut 1B configuration and made its first flight on 17 December. Early the following year it reached a speed of Mach 1.2 at 15,240 m (50,000 ft). On 26 October, Mach 1.3 was attained in a steep dive from an altitude of 15,240 meters. In May 1956, it was used for captive-carry tests of the Nord AA.20 air-to-air missile. Afterwards, the Gerfaut 1B was relegated to serving as a chase plane for the Nord 1500 Griffon, making its last flight on 2 July 1959.

The second aircraft, the 1405 Gerfaut II, was slightly lengthened which improved its fuel capacity and its transonic aerodynamics. It also received a clipped delta wing of the same area as the Gerfaut 1B and a 38-kilonewton (8,500 lb_{f}) Atar 101F engine. It made its first flight on 17 April 1956 and reached a maximum speed in level flight of Mach 1.13. It had an excellent rate of climb and set multiple world records for time to altitude from a standing start.

- 16 February 1957: 6,000 m (20,000 ft) in 1 minute 17 seconds
- 16 February 1957: 9,000 m (30,000 ft) in 1 minute 33.7 seconds
- 16 February 1957: 12,000 m (39,000 ft) in 2 minutes 17.4 seconds
- 16 February 1957: 15,000 m (49,000 ft) in 3 minute 46 seconds
- 28 February 1957: 3,000 m (9,800 ft) in 51 seconds

In June, the Gerfaut II performed two demonstrations at the Paris Air Show and then began conducting flight tests of the AA.20. These included supersonic launches at speeds up to Mach 1.35. Around this same time the aircraft was fitted with a more powerful Atar 101G turbojet. The following year the aircraft began testing various air-to-air radars, with an Aladin system fitted in a fairing above the nose in May 1958 and an Aida system followed. It made its last flight on 7 August 1959 and both prototypes were sent to the Military Test Range at Cazaux to be used as targets.

== Variants ==
1402A Gerfaut
Delta research aircraft with a ATAR 101C turbojet, one built.
1402B Gerfaut 1B
The first prototype with a larger wing and an ATAR 101D turbojet.
1405 Gerfaut II
Lengthened aircraft with clipped wings and an ATAR 101F turbojet, one built.

== Operator ==
France

== Specifications (1405 Gerfaut II) ==
Data from X-Planes of Europe: Secret Research Aircraft From the Golden Age 1946–1974

General characteristics

- Crew: 1
- Length: 11.39 m (37 ft 4 in)
- Wingspan: 7.5 m (24 ft 7 in)
- Wing area: 26 m^{2} (280 sq ft)
- Max takeoff weight: 5,380 kg (11,861 lb)
- Powerplant: 1 × ATAR 101G afterburning turbojet, 31 kN (7,000 lbf) thrust dry, 44 kN (9,900 lbf) with afterburner

Performance

- Maximum speed: Mach 1.13 at 10,800 m (35,400 ft)
- Service ceiling: 15,400 m (50,500 ft)

== Bibliography ==
- Buttler, Tony & Delezenne, Jean-Louis (2010). X-Planes of Europe: Secret Research Aircraft from the Golden Age 1946-1974. Manchester, UK: Hikoki Publications. ISBN 978-1-902-10921-3.
- Carbonel, Jean-Christophe (2016). French Secret Projects. Vol. 1: Post War Fighters. Manchester, UK: Crecy Publishing. ISBN 978-1-91080-900-6.
- Hartmann, Gérard (18 August 2007). "L'Arsenal de l'aéronautique" (PDF). Gérard Hartman.
