= SFCA Lignel 20 =

1930s French racing aircraft

Lignel 20
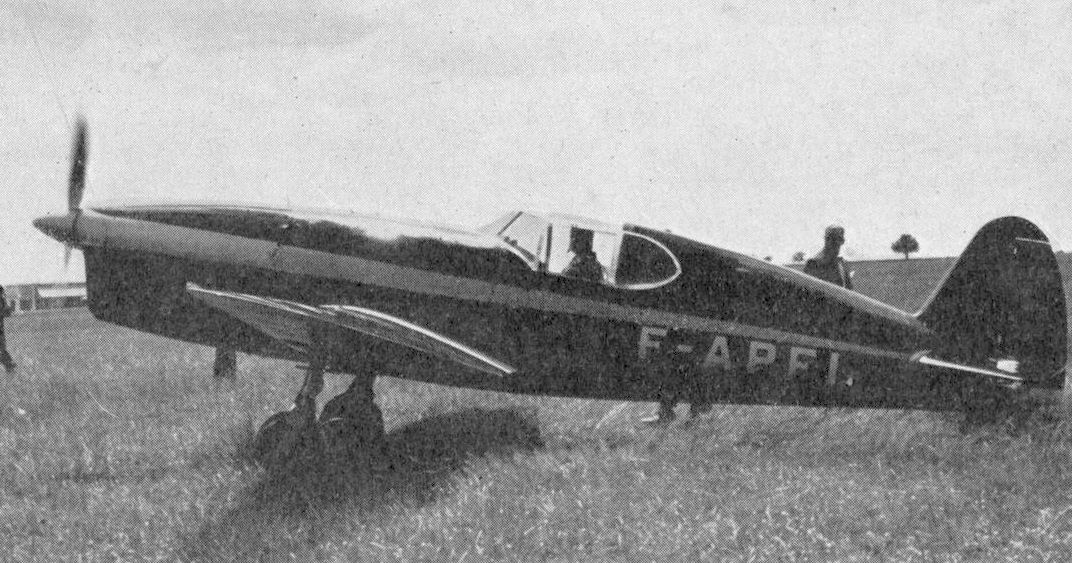

General information
- Type: One or two seat tourer, racer and aerobatic aircraft
- National origin: France
- Manufacturer: Société Française de Construction Aéronautique (SFCA)
- Designer: Jean Lignel
- Number built: 2

History
- First flight: 15 April 1937

The SFCA Lignel 20 was a French, single engine, low wing monoplane, one of a series of this type built by SFCA in the 1930s. It was capable of aerobatics but was primarily a racing aircraft.

== Design and development ==
Jean Lignel's early designs with SFCA were developments of André Maillet's 1933 low wing Maillet-Nening MN-A. The Lignel 20, his first design under his own name, had a good deal in common with the SFCA Maillet 20 though it was a smaller aircraft seating one or two rather than the Maillet 20's three and had a more powerful engine. It was derived from the design of the SFCA Lignel 10 single seat fighter trainer, which did not fly until February 1938. By then the Lignel 20 had already flown.

The Lignel 20 was a low wing cantilever monoplane of entirely wooden construction apart from its engine mounting. The wing had a rectangular centre section with tapered outer panels, the latter with dihedral, which gave the wing an approximately elliptical plan. It was plywood skinned, with an external fabric covering. There were split flaps on the inboard trailing edges and ailerons outboard.

The fuselage and empennage was built in a similar way. In the nose a 160 kW (220 hp) Renault 6Q-03, an air-cooled, inverted six cylinder inline engine supercharged to 2,000 m (6,600 ft) was mounted on steel tube bearings. Behind the engine, the fuselage had an oval section. The cockpit was behind the wing trailing edge; though primarily a single seat aircraft a passenger could be accommodated. The cockpit glazing was faired smoothly into a raised rear fuselage.

Its straight-edged, round-topped fin carried a curved-edged unbalanced rudder which reached down to the keel. It worked in a small cut-out in the straight-tapered elevators, mounted on a triangular tailplane positioned mid-high on the fuselage; the tailplane incidence could be adjusted on the ground.

The Lignel 20 had retractable landing gear with mainwheeels on forked cantilever legs from the outer edges of the centre section, swinging outwards into wing recesses. There were covers attached to the inner side of the forks, acting as aircraft fairings when retraction was complete.

The Lignel 20 first flew on 15 April 1937. Two were built. During 1937 the second of these was re-engined with a more powerful 210 kW (280 hp) Régnier R-161 which increased its maximum speed to 420 km/h (260 mph; 230 kn). It was redesignated the SFFCA Lignel 20S and first flew in November 1937. It was announced at the 1938 Paris Salon that the Lignel 20S was currently being fitted with a supercharged, eight cylinder Régnier engine producing 270 kW (360 hp), in preparation for attempts in 1939 on world records in the 8 L (490 cu in) capacity engine category; with this engine the maximum speed was 460 km/h (290 mph). Louis Céments was test flying it from SFCA's airfield at Buc in March 1939.

== Operational history ==
The two Lignel 20s were entered for the 1937 Coupe Deutsch, a pure speed competition, but the first was lost in accident whilst attempting a speed record over 2,000 km (1,200 mi). After Caudron, the only other manufacturer with entries, pulled out, SFCA decided a competition with only a single aircraft in it was pointless and the Coupe Deutsch was cancelled for that year.

== Variants ==
Lignel 20
Original 160 kW (220 hp) Renault 6Q-03 engine, two built.
Lignel 20S
The second Type 20 re-engined first with a 210 kW (280 hp) Régnier R-161-01, then an 8 L (490 cu in), supercharged Régnier.

== Specifications ==
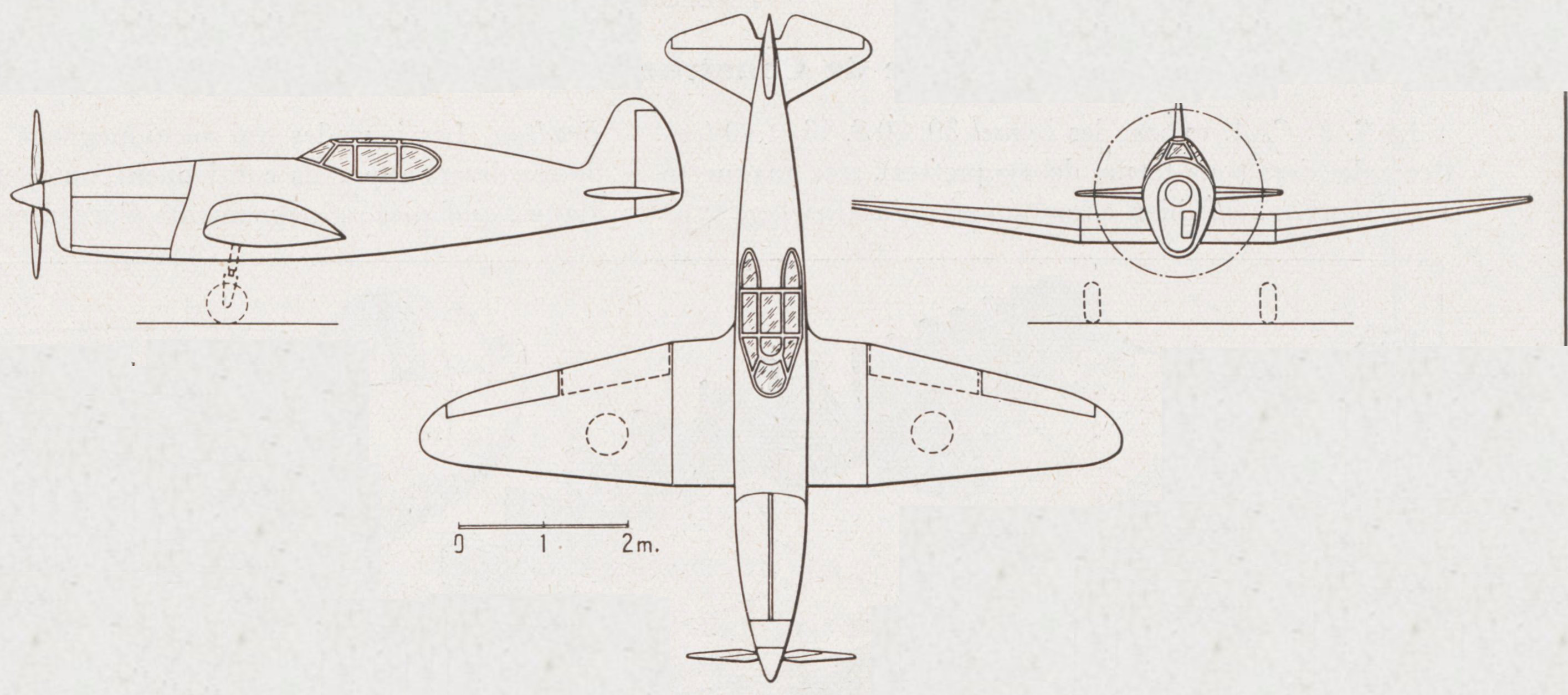
3-views of the Lignel 20.

Data from Jane's All the World's Aircraft 1938

General characteristics

- Crew: One or two
- Length: 10 m (32 ft 10 in)
- Wingspan: 8.358 m (27 ft 5 in)
- Height: 2.65 m (8 ft 8 in)
- Wing area: 11 m^{2} (120 sq ft)
- Empty weight: 785 kg (1,731 lb)
- Gross weight: 1,200 kg (2,646 lb)
- Powerplant: 1 × Renault 6Q-03 six cylinder, air-cooled, inverted, supercharged inline, 160 kW (220 hp)
- Propellers: 2-bladed variable pitch propeller

Performance

- Maximum speed: 385 km/h (239 mph, 208 kn) at sea level. 400 km/h (250 mph; 220 kn) at 2,000 m (6,600 ft).
- Cruise speed: 350 km/h (220 mph, 190 kn)
- Endurance: 3.25 hrs
