= Kawasaki Ki-64 =

Japanese experimental fighter prototype

Ki-64
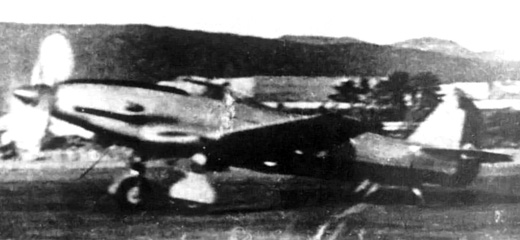

General information
- Type: Fighter
- Manufacturer: Kawasaki Kōkūki Kōgyō K.K.
- Status: Cancelled 1944
- Primary user: Imperial Japanese Army
- Number built: 1

History
- First flight: December 1943

The Kawasaki Ki-64 (Allied code name: Rob) was a one-off prototype of an experimental heavy, single-seat fighter. It had two unusual design features. First, it had two Kawasaki Ha-40 engines in tandem, one in the aircraft nose and the other behind the cockpit, both connected by a drive shaft. This combination (called the Kawasaki Ha-201) drove two, three-bladed, contra-rotating propellers. The second feature was using the wing surface as a radiator for the water-cooled engines. The aircraft first flew in December 1943. During the fifth flight, the rear engine caught fire, and, while the aircraft made an emergency landing, it was damaged. The aircraft was subsequently abandoned in mid-1944 in favour of more promising projects. The airframe survived the war, and parts of the unique cooling system were sent to Wright Field for examination.

== Specifications (Ki-64) ==
Data from Warplanes of the Second World War, Volume Three: Fighters; WW2 Aircraft Fact Files: Japanese Army Fighters, Part 1; Japanese Aircraft of the Pacific War

General characteristics

- Crew: 1 (pilot)
- Length: 11 m (36 ft 1 in)
- Wingspan: 13.5 m (44 ft 3 in)
- Height: 4.25 m (13 ft 11 in)
- Wing area: 28 m^{2} (300 sq ft)
- Empty weight: 4,050 kg (8,929 lb)
- Gross weight: 5,100 kg (11,244 lb)
- Powerplant: 1 × Kawasaki Ha-201 coupled liquid-cooled V12 engine, 1,750 kW (2,350 hp)
- Propellers: 2 × 3-bladed contra-rotating propellers

Performance

- Maximum speed: 690 km/h (430 mph, 370 kn) at 5,000 metres (16,000 ft)
- Range: 1,000 km (620 mi, 540 nmi)
- Service ceiling: 12,000 m (39,000 ft)
- Time to altitude: 5.5 minutes to 5,000 metres (16,000 ft)
- Wing loading: 182.1 kg/m^{2} (37.3 lb/sq ft)
- Power/mass: 2.91 kg/kW (2.17 kg/hp; 4.78 lb/hp)

Armament

- Guns: 4 × 20 mm (0.79 in) Ho-5 cannon or 2 × Ho-5 and 2 × 12.7 mm (0.50 in) Ho-103 machine guns

== See also ==
Aircraft of comparable role, configuration, and era

- Arsenal VB 10
- Bell P-63 Kingcobra
- Blohm & Voss BV 155
- Dornier Do 335

Related lists

- List of fighter aircraft
