= SFCA Lignel 46 Coach =

1940s French light aircraft

Lignel 46 Coach

General information
- Type: Four seat touring aircraft
- National origin: France
- Manufacturer: Société Française de Construction Aéronautique (SFCA)
- Designer: Jean Lignel
- Number built: 2

History
- First flight: 13 August 1947

The SFCA Lignel 46 Coach was a French four seat touring aircraft built soon after World War II. It was SFCA's last design, with two prototypes built, flown and raced but engine supply problems prevented production.

== Design and development ==
The Lignel 46 was the last aircraft produced by Société Française de Construction Aéronautique (SFCA). It was a cantilever low wing monoplane, seating four in two side-by-side rows under a multipart glazed canopy. The two main transparencies opened away from each other on vertical, forward hinges for cabin access. There was a 140 kW (190 hp) Mathis G8R or Mathis G8 20 inverted V-8 engine, driving an automatic variable pitch propeller in the nose; behind the cabin the fuselage tapered linearly from the full cabin depth. The Lignel 46 was a wooden aircraft and its monocoque fuselage was built using a composite shell composed of perforated cork sheets between inner and outer shaped plywood layers, a method patented by Jean Broudeau and one that SFCA had explored before World War II.

The wings of the Lignel 46 were broadly similar to those of the SFCA Lignel 20. The central and outer panels were distinguished by the lack of dihedral on the former; both had straight, unswept leading edges but the trailing edge of the outer panels was curved, producing a roughly elliptical plan. Like the Lignel 20 the 46 had somewhat inset ailerons and split flaps. The Lignel 46 also had unusual, very small fixed leading edge slots at the wing tips. Apart from its variable incidence tailplane, mounted at mid-height on the fuselage, the empennage was conventional, with a rounded fin and rudder. It had a fixed, tailwheel undercarriage with both landing legs and wheels in aircraft fairings.

The SFCA Lignel 46 first flew on 13 August 1947. Two were completed. One of them was on display at the 18th Paris Aeronautical Salon which opened on 29 May 1949, by which time it had done significant flying. Mathis went out of business in 1950 and SFCA decided not to re-engine the Type 46, though the two prototypes remained active until at least 1951.

== Operational history ==
In its short operational life the Lignal 46 took part in several major competitions. Its best result by far was in 1948, when Jean Lignel took it to first place from a field of over fifty aircraft contesting the Italian Rally. In the summer of 1949 one flew in the Grand Prix de Meaux, though without distinction. The following year the second prototype F-BCFS participated in the South Coast race in England, flown by its designer, finishing well down the field despite recording a speed of 262 km/h (163 mph). In 1951 Louis Clément flew the first prototype F-BCZJ in the same race, finishing in mid-field.

== Specifications ==
Data from Les Avions Français de 1944 à 1964 (1990)

General characteristics

- Crew: One
- Capacity: Three passengers
- Length: 8.00 m (26 ft 3 in)
- Wingspan: 10.30 m (33 ft 10 in)
- Height: 2.60 m (8 ft 6 in)
- Wing area: 15 m^{2} (160 sq ft)
- Empty weight: 820 kg (1,808 lb)
- Gross weight: 1,335 kg (2,943 lb)
- Powerplant: 1 × Mathis G8R inverted V-8, 140 kW (190 hp)
- Propellers: 2-bladed Ratier, automatic variable pitch

Performance

- Maximum speed: 270 km/h (170 mph, 150 kn)
- Range: 960 km (600 mi, 520 nmi)
- Service ceiling: 7,000 m (23,000 ft)
