= Nord 1500 Griffon =

1950s French prototype interceptor aircraft

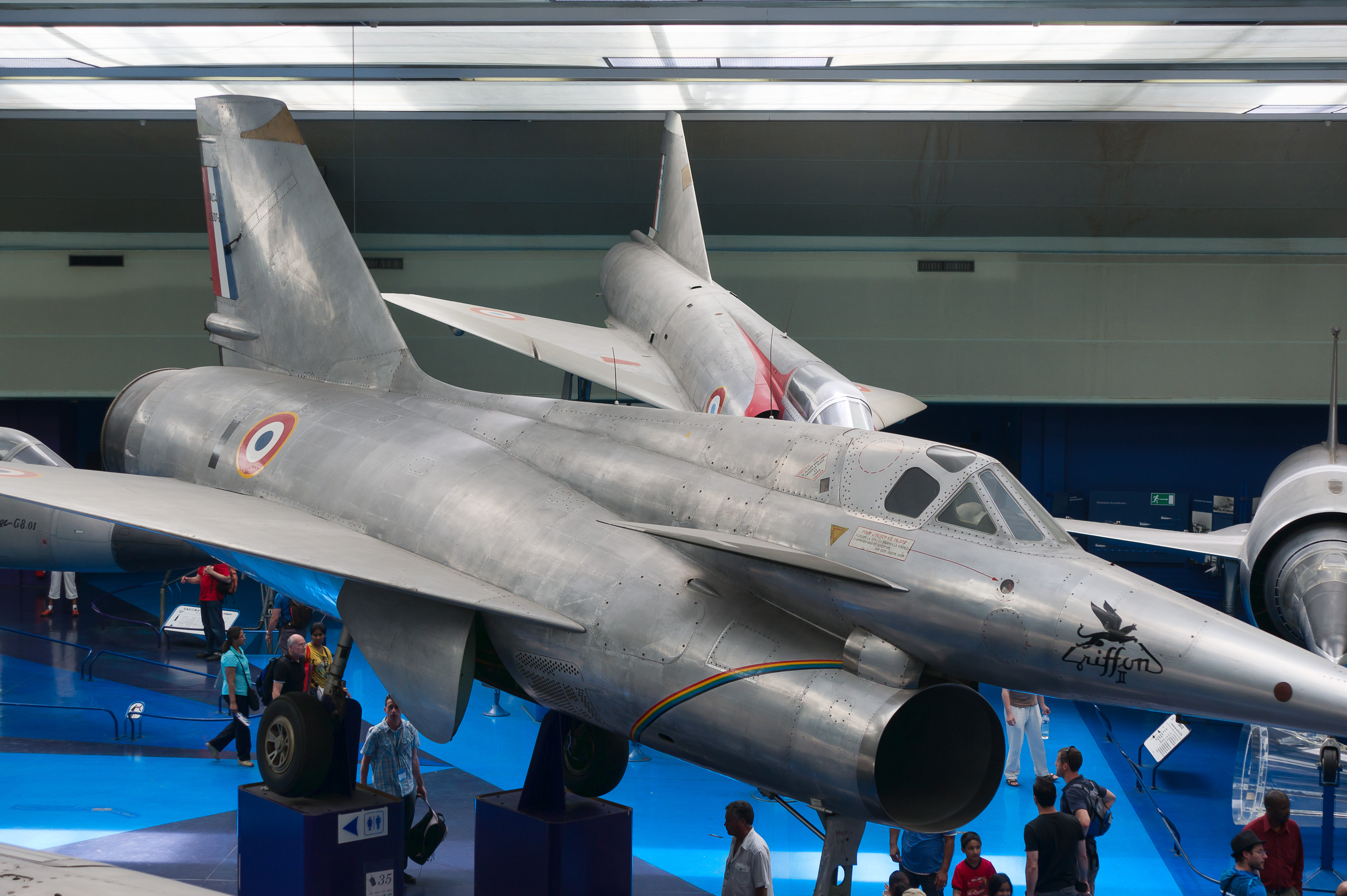
- Griffon II in the Musée de l'air et de l'espace

General information
- Type: Experimental interceptor
- National origin: France
- Manufacturer: Nord Aviation
- Number built: 2

History
- First flight: 20 September 1955
- Retired: 1961

The Nord 1500 Griffon is an experimental ramjet-powered interceptor aircraft designed and built by French state-owned aircraft manufacturer Nord Aviation. The Griffon was developed to become a Mach 2 follow on to the supersonic Nord Gerfaut research aircraft. Development of the aircraft began in earnest after the receipt of a letter of intent in 1953 for a pair of unarmed research aircraft. The design featured an innovative dual propulsion turbojet-ramjet configuration; the former being used to takeoff and attain sufficient speed to start the latter.

The first prototype, named Griffon I, made its maiden flight in 1955 and eventually reached a speed of Mach 1.3. Because it lacked the ramjet engine, it was mostly used for exploring the aircraft's aerodynamic properties and its systems. Its flight testing was terminated shortly after the ramjet-equipped Griffon II made its first flight two years later. This aircraft attained a maximum speed of Mach 2.19 and set a world record for a small closed course in 1959. According to the Fédération Aéronautique Internationale, the aircraft held the flight airspeed record from 5 to 31 October of 1959, with a speed of 1,441.6 mph (2,320 km/h) attributed to André Turcat. It was last flown in 1961 and currently resides in the Musée de l'air et de l'espace outside Paris.

== Development and description ==
The Nord 1500 Griffon originated from a state-sponsored study into delta and swept wings. To provide data for these studies Arsenal de l'Aéronautique (SFECMAS's nationalised predecessor) built a wooden glider, the Arsenal 1301, that could be fitted with both delta and swept wings and with and without canards. Towed to the release point by SNCAC Martinet, Douglas DC-3 or SNCASE Languedoc transport aircraft, the glider provided valuable data for the design of the Gerfaut.

To utilise this data SFECMAS's chief designer, Jean Galtier, initiated the 1400, 1500 and 1910 interceptor projects with delta wings and different types of propulsion systems. The 1400 developed into the Nord Gerfaut series, the 1500 became the Griffon, while the 1910, ambitiously specified with two large ramjet engines, was never pursued. Galtier envisioned the Griffon as the Mach 2 successor to the supersonic Gerfaut. By this time Arsenal had been privatised as SFECMAS - Société Française d'Etude et de Construction de Matériel Aéronautiques Spéciaux. Powered by a large ramjet with turbojet sustainer, the Griffon was renamed from the SFECMAS 1500 Guépard (Cheetah) after SFECMAS was merged with SNCAN to form Nord Aviation.

On 24 August 1953, a pair of prototypes were ordered, although the final contract (No. 2003/55) would not be issued until 1955. Although intended by Nord to eventually fulfil a requirement for a light interceptor capable of using grass airfields, these two aircraft were ordered without any military equipment installed, being intended for research purposes only.

Much like he did with the Gerfaut, Gaultier opted for a straight-through air duct to keep the air entering the engines as calm as possible and positioned the single-seat cockpit immediately above the semi-circular ventral air intake. The large tubular fuselage supported the same delta wing as used on the Gerfaut and the swept vertical stabilizer with rudder. The forward fuselage had small triangular canards positioned at either side of this cockpit to counteract the center of pressure of the delta wing's tendency to depress the nose as the aircraft approached transonic speeds. The aircraft was fitted with a tricycle undercarriage that retracted into the wings and the underside of the air intake.

A key innovation of the Griffon was its dual-propulsion arrangement, which incorporated a turbojet-ramjet powerplant. The turbojet would enable the aircraft to perform unassisted takeoffs (ramjets cannot produce thrust at zero airspeed, and thus cannot move an aircraft from a standstill) while the ramjet would provide additional thrust once the aircraft had attained an airspeed in excess of 1,000 km/h (600 mph). To reduce risks in using the turbo-ramjet powerplant, the first Griffon (Nord 1500-01 Griffon I) was built with only the afterburning 37.3-kilonewton (8,400 lb_{f}) SNECMA Atar 101G21 turbojet engine installed with the ramjet to be added at a later date.

== Flight testing ==
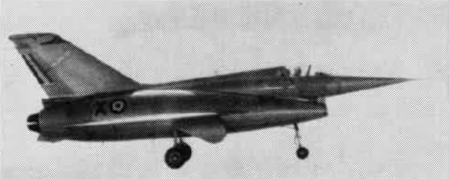
The Griffon I during a test flight, c. 1956

The Griffon I made its maiden flight on 20 September 1955, piloted by André Turcat. Flight testing quickly proved the aircraft to be underpowered, a determination that was compounded by the cancellation of plans to install the planned ramjet propulsion system. Despite this reported lack of power, the Griffon I still managed to attain a maximum speed of Mach 1.15 on its first supersonic flight on 11 January 1956. At some point during its life the air intake was enlarged, probably when the more powerful Atar 101E engine was installed and before the aircraft attained its maximum speed of Mach 1.3 at an altitude of 8,560 m (28,080 ft). Although the initial flight testing showed that engine performance above 9,144 m (30,000 ft) suffered, the aircraft's handling qualities were excellent. Its nose gear collapsed on 19 June when Turcat was taxiing across a grass field and the aircraft did not fly again until 26 July. The Griffon I was largely similar to the later ramjet-equipped Griffon II; amongst the few visible differences between the two aircraft were the smaller intake and the two-position exhaust nozzle used only on the Griffon I. It was retired on 16 April 1957.

The Griffon II was fitted with the combination of an Atar 101E-3 turbojet and Nord ramjet. To accommodate the 1.5-metre (4 ft 11 in) diameter of the latter, the aft fuselage was lengthened and widened and its greater requirement for air meant that the ventral air intake had to be enlarged. The aircraft made its first flight on 23 January 1957 and its first supersonic flight occurred on 6 April. Performance was disappointing as it failed to exceed the Mach 1.3 of the Griffon I as the ramjet was still not receiving enough air to fully power it. The Griffon II subsequently had the intake enlarged yet again and reached Mach 1.85 on its first test flight afterwards. The Griffon II set a speed record of 2,320 kilometres per hour (1,440 mph) on 5 October 1959. It attained a peak speed of Mach 2.19 at 15,240 m (50,000 ft) while being piloted by Turcat on 13 October. Turcat had earlier broken the world record for the 100 km (62 mi) closed-circuit course by over 400 km/h (250 mph) with a speed of 1,643 km/h (1,021 mph) on 25 February, an achievement for which he was honored with the Harmon Trophy. The United States Air Force (USAF) contributed some money for the flight testing until 1960. No flights were made at all between February and July of that year and the Griffon II made its last flight on 5 June 1961.

The flight-test program had revealed several technical difficulties were present in the aircraft, including concerns regarding kinetically-generated heat. One particular area of concern was the ramjet exhaust temperature which frequently damaged the tailpipe, another was the skin temperature of the airframe's Duralumin-alloy skin. Flight tests also focused on trying to control the ramjet, which could not be throttled up or down, just on or off, via adjusting the fuel/air ratio. Pilots reported that the Griffon II's flight characteristics were excellent at all speeds: the ramjet could be ignited across a very wide band of speeds and its air intake was insensitive to angle of attack issues. Furthermore its ability to maintain acceleration in a turn was instrumental to its success in the closed-circuit record performance.

== Variants ==
SFECMAS 1500 Guépard
The original designation and name of the initial design studies carried out at SFECMAS.
Nord 1500-01 Griffon I
The first aircraft completed with only the SNECMA Atar 101F afterburning turbojet component of the planned turbo-ramjet powerplant.
Nord 1500-02 Griffon II
The second aircraft fitted with the definitive turbo-ramjet powerplant.

== Operators ==
France

== Aircraft on display ==
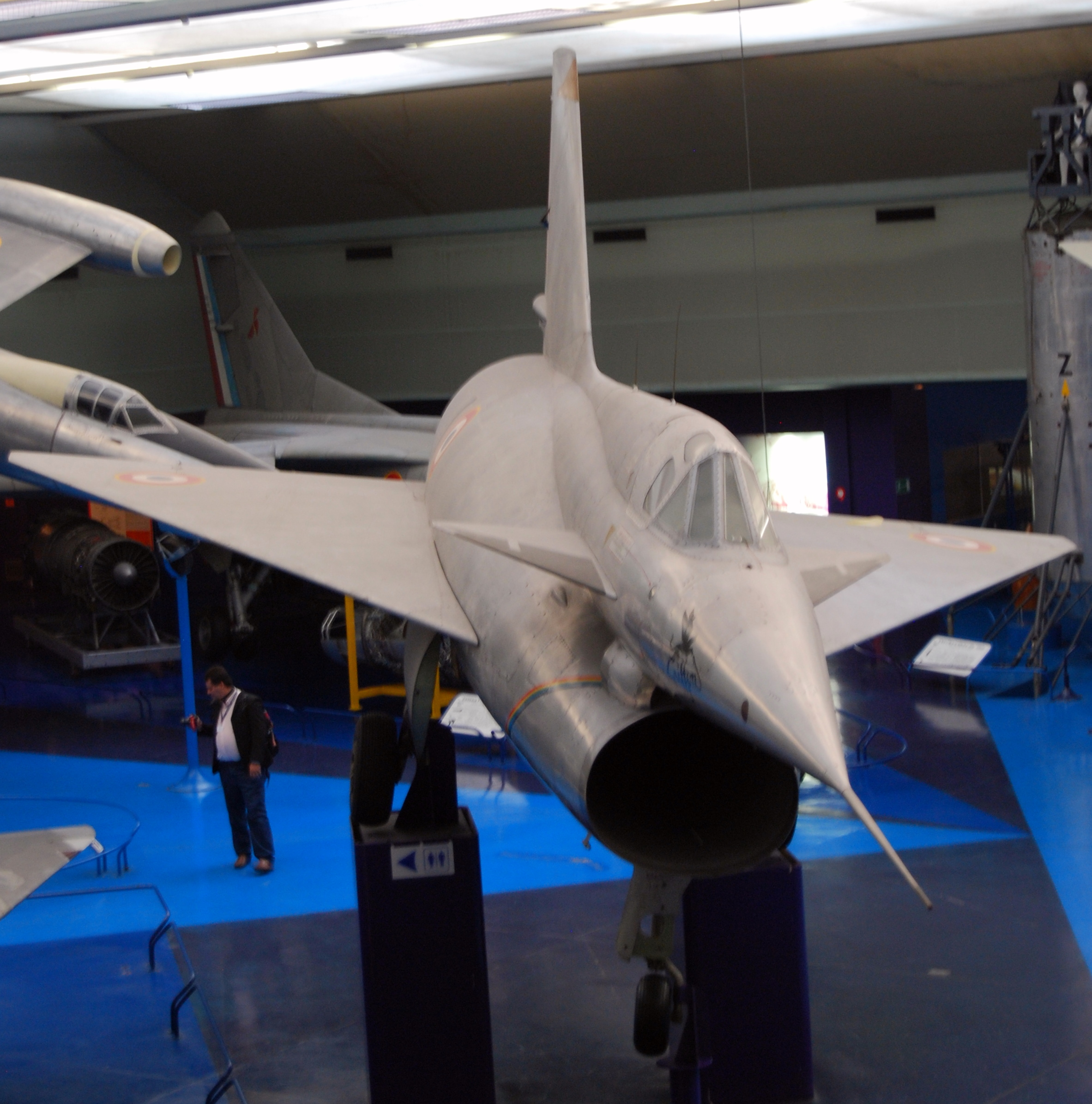
Forward view of the preserved Griffon II

The Nord 1500 Griffon II is presently on display in the Musée de l'air et de l'espace, at Le Bourget, near Paris.

== Specifications (Nord 1500-2 Griffon II) ==
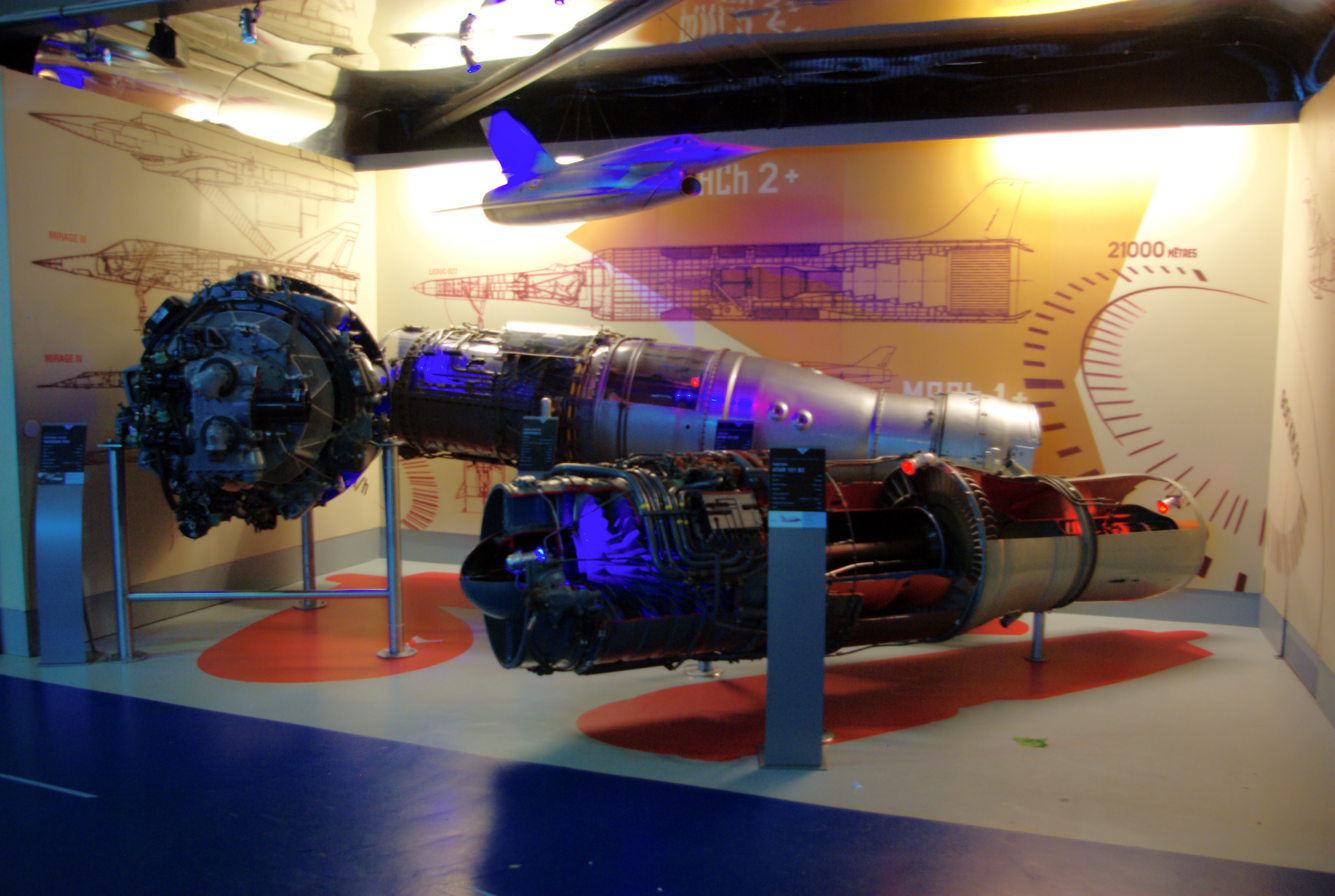
SNECMA ATAR 101E-3 turbojet engine and Nord Stato-Réacteur ramjet on static display

Data from X-Planes of Europe: Secret Research Aircraft From the Golden Age 1946–1974; Concept Aircraft: Prototypes, X-Planes and Experimental Aircraft; Les oubliés du Salon de l'Aeronautique (5): les experimentaux

General characteristics

- Crew: 1
- Length: 14.54 m (47 ft 8 in)
- Wingspan: 8.1 m (26 ft 7 in)
- Height: 5.0 m (16 ft 5 in)
- Wing area: 32 m^{2} (340 sq ft)
- Max takeoff weight: 6,745 kg (14,870 lb)
- Powerplant: 1 × SNECMA Atar 101E-3 turbojet engine, 34.3 kN (7,700 lbf) thrust
- Powerplant: 1 × Nord Stato-Réacteur ramjet, 67.8 kN (15,200 lbf) thrust

Performance

- Maximum speed: 2,320 km/h (1,440 mph, 1,250 kn) @ 3,300 m (10,800 ft)
- Maximum speed: Mach 2.19
- Rate of climb: 86.67 m/s (17,061 ft/min)

== See also ==
Related development

- Nord Gerfaut
- French space program

Aircraft of comparable role, configuration, and era

- Hawker P.1121
- Republic XF-91 Thunderceptor
- Republic XF-103
- Saunders-Roe SR.53
- Saunders-Roe SR.177
- SNCASO Trident
