= SFCA Lignel 161 =

1930s French trainer aircraft

Lignel 161

General information
- Type: Trainer aircraft
- National origin: France
- Manufacturer: Société Française de Construction Aéronautique (SFCA)
- Number built: 1

History
- First flight: 1938

The SFCA Lignel 161 was a French trainer aircraft built in the late 1930s.

== Specifications ==
Data from

General characteristics

- Crew: Two
- Length: 7.78 m (25 ft 6 in)
- Wingspan: 10.30 m (33 ft 10 in)
- Height: 3.18 m (10 ft 5 in)
- Wing area: 15 m^{2} (160 sq ft)
- Powerplant: 1 × Renault 6Q-03 six cylinder, air-cooled, inverted, supercharged inline, 160 kW (220 hp)
- Propellers: 2-bladed variable pitch propeller

Performance

- Maximum speed: 320 km/h (200 mph, 170 kn)
- Range: 1,000 km (620 mi, 540 nmi)
- Service ceiling: 6,800 m (22,300 ft)
