= SFCA Lignel 16 =

1940s French trainer aircraft

Lignel 16

General information
- Type: Trainer aircraft
- National origin: France
- Manufacturer: Société Française de Construction Aéronautique (SFCA)
- Number built: 1

History
- First flight: 1942

The SFCA Lignel 16 was a French trainer aircraft built in the early 1940s.

== Specifications ==
Data from

General characteristics

- Crew: Two
- Length: 8.01 m (26 ft 3 in)
- Wingspan: 10.30 m (33 ft 10 in)
- Height: 3.18 m (10 ft 5 in)
- Wing area: 15 m^{2} (160 sq ft)
- Powerplant: 1 × Béarn 6C-01 six cylinder, air-cooled, inverted, supercharged inline, 270 kW (360 hp)
- Propellers: 2-bladed variable pitch propeller

Performance

- Maximum speed: 340 km/h (210 mph, 180 kn)
- Range: 1,000 km (620 mi, 540 nmi)
- Service ceiling: 7,000 m (23,000 ft)
