= SFCA Taupin =

1930s French light aircraft

Taupin

General information
- Type: Single seat sports aircraft
- National origin: France
- Manufacturer: Société Française de Construction Aéronautique (SFCA)
- Designer: Jean Lignel
- Number built: 53 (all variants)

History
- First flight: By October 1935

The SFCA Taupin was a French tandem-wing aircraft, designed to provide a simple, stable and safe aircraft able to take-off and land in small spaces.

== Design and development ==
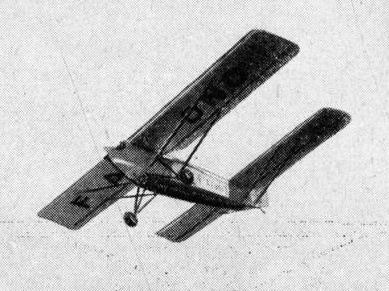
SFCA Taupin photo from L'Aerophile February 1938

In 1907 Louis Peyret, a friend of Louis Blériot designed the tandem wing Bleriot VI. Alex Manerol, flying the Peyret Tandem won the 1922 Itford glider contest and in 1924 Peyret obtained a patent for it. He continued to build designs of this type as well as more conventional aircraft until his death in 1933, after which his patent rights were purchased by the Société Française de Construction Aéronautique (SFCA). In 1935 they designed and built the tandem wing Taupin which, apart from a different engine, was very similar to the Peyret VI of 1933. Taupin is the French vernacular name for beetles of the family Elateridae or click-beetles, known for their ability to jump rapidly into the air.

The Taupin had rectangular plan wings, the forward one providing 65% of the wing area, both mounted on the central fuselage longeron. They were wooden two spar structures, fabric covered and braced from below with parallel pairs of forward leaning struts to the lower fuselage longerons, each pair stiffened with a horizontal cross-brace between them and with short upward secondary braces to the wings. The wings were mounted with equal and significant dihedral. Both had full-span flaps which were interconnected and could move differentially as ailerons and elevators and together as camber changing flaps, a system first used on the glider and acknowledged as the source of its "extraordinary controllability".

The fuselage was a wooden structure with plywood covering. Its lower part was rectangular in section and the upper part roughly triangular, with a central longeron along its top to which the wings were joined. This member was visible above the open cockpit, placed immediately under the wing trailing edge and formed by opening the upper fuselage. Ahead of the cockpit, and on some examples behind it, the upper surfaces were inwardly dished to improve the pilot's view and there was a cut-out in the wing trailing edge for the same reason, much bigger than that shown in L'Aéronatique. The Taupin had a 22 kW (30 hp) Mengin C air-cooled flat-twin engine, sometimes referred to as a Poinsard after its designer, in the nose with its cylinders exposed and supplied from a fuel tank in the fuselage. At the rear the vertical tail was conventional, with a triangular fin bearing a round-topped, straight-edged unbalanced rudder which reached down to the keel and operated in a small cut-out in the rear wing control surfaces.

The Taupin had tailskid landing gear with its low pressure mainwheels mounted on V-struts hinged from the lower longerons and with a single telescopic strut on each side to the mid-upper longerons, though the drawing in L'Aéronatique shows a different, split axle undercarriage.

The exact date of the Taupin's first flight is not known, though it was before late October 1935 when it took part successfully in the 1935 Tour de France des Prototypes. Later that year it went for certification at Villacoublay; it returned to SFCA in January 1936 for modifications, restarting testing at Villacoublay in April. It lived up to its name, needing only 15 m (49 ft) to take off.

During 1937 SFCA introduced a two-seat version of the Taupin, the Taupin 5/2. This had a 45 kW (60 hp) Regnier inverted inline engine, wings with duralumin tube spars and side-by-side seats. Take-off weight rose by 80% but the dimensions were only slightly increased.

Immediately after World War II SFCA introduced the metal framed Lignel 44 Cross-Country, which had dimensions slightly larger than the Taupin 5/2, a 55 kW (74 hp) Régnier 4 D2 inverted inline engine and a new, enclosed cabin fuselage; the seats, accessed by side doors, were still under the trailing edge of the wing though without a cut-out. As in the earlier designs there was no vertical separation of the wings, both mounted on the upper fuselage longerons. It was 20% heavier than the Taupin 5/2 and had a maximum speed of 135 km/h (84 mph; 73 kn).

== Operational history ==
SFCA quickly put the Taupin into production, with five completed in March and another twenty planned for April. The price was FF 15,000. The final production figures were forty-eight Taupins, four Taupin 5/2s and one Lignell 44. The reconstructed French pre-war register shows that many of the single seat aircraft were used in the national Aviation Populaire programme, though others were used by French aero-clubs.

In July 1937 Louis Clément in a Taupin won the rally at the Zürich meeting ahead of a large field. He flew 756 km (470 mi) at an average speed of 68 km/h (42 mph).

In November 1937 a Taupin 5/2, re-engined with a 67 kW (90 hp) Régnier and flown by both Clément and Claire Roman set several French altitude records for aircraft with engine capacity between 2 and 4 L (120 and 240 cu in). Flying solo Clément reached 6,518 m (21,385 ft) and Roman 6,241 m (20,476 ft), a female record; with Mlle Lucas-Naudine aboard she set a two-seat record for a man or woman at 5,343 m (17,530 ft).

At least two of the tandem wing types flew for several years after World War II. The Lignel 44 was destroyed in an accident in May 1955, killing Louis Clément but Taupin F-AZBG remained on the French register in 2014.

== Variants ==
Peyret VI
1933 tandem of same dimensions and appearance but with a 25 kW (34 hp) ABC Scorpion flat-twin
SFCA Taupin
original design, 48 built.
SFCA Taupin 5/2
side-by-side two seater, 4 built.
SFCA Lignel 44 Cross-Country
1946 cabin version, 1 built.

== Specifications (Taupin) ==
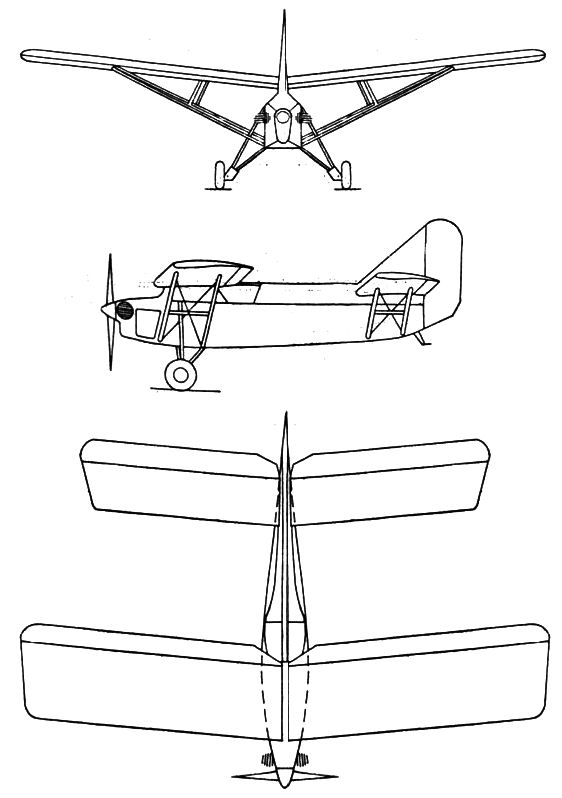
SFCA Taupin 3-view drawing from L'Aerophile February 1938

Data from L'Année Aéronautique (1936–7):

General characteristics

- Crew: One
- Length: 5.84 m (19 ft 2 in)
- Wingspan: 8.40 m (27 ft 7 in) forward wing
- Height: 2.72 m (8 ft 11 in)
- Wing area: 13 m^{2} (140 sq ft) forward, rear 7 m^{2} (75 sq ft)
- Empty weight: 200 kg (441 lb)
- Gross weight: 315 kg (694 lb)
- Fuel capacity: 25 kg (55 lb) fuel and oil
- Powerplant: 1 × Mengin C (2A.01) air-cooled flat-twin, 22 kW (30 hp) 30 CV

Performance

- Maximum speed: 110 km/h (68 mph, 59 kn) at sea level
- Minimum control speed: 30 km/h (19 mph, 16 kn)
- Range: 400 km (250 mi, 220 nmi)
- Service ceiling: 3,400 m (11,200 ft) in 52 min 20 s
- Time to altitude: 7 min 16 s to 1,000 m (3,300 ft)
- Take-off run: 15 m (49 ft)
- Landing run: 10 m (33 ft)
