= Arsenal 2301 =

- SFECMAS 1301, late in development

General information
- Type: Full scale, piloted glider model of fighter aircraft
- National origin: France
- Manufacturer: Arsenal de l'Aéronautique
- Designer: Jean Galtier
- Number built: 1

History
- First flight: 29 November 1951 (16 January 1953 as delta)

The Arsenal 2301, Arsenal Ars.2301, SFECMAS 1301 or SFECMAS Ars.1301 was an experimental French air-launched glider, built to test the aerodynamics of aircraft of novel configuration at full scale. It first flew in 1951 with swept wings but after 1953 it had a delta wing. Trials with this wing established the layouts of the Nord Gerfaut and Griffon.

== Design and development ==
In the 1950s more than one French aircraft design was tested with larger scale glider models than could be put into wind-tunnels. These were piloted and launched from the top of a large aircraft like a SNCASE Languedoc, as was the SCAN 271 or alternatively towed to altitude. The Arsenal 2301 was a full-scale model of a proposed rocket powered fighter aircraft which developed German ideas on swept wing aircraft expressed in the wartime DFS 346. It was a wooden aircraft, with swept, straight tapered mid-wings, square tipped at right angles to the leading edge. The fuselage was long and fine, with the cockpit well forward of the wing. The fuselage began to taper to the pointed nose just behind the canopy. The vertical tail was swept, straight tipped and tapered, though there was a curved fillet between the fin root and the fuselage. An all-moving tail, straight tapered, square tipped and with sweep on its leading edge, was placed about one-third the way up the fin. The 2301 had a bicycle landing gear, with a fixed main wheel under the central fuselage and a small, retractable nose wheel; retracting stabilizing wheels were positioned near the wing tips. Its span was 8 m (26 ft 3 in) and length 14 m (45 ft 11 in). Its primary purpose was to explore the low speed characteristics of the design.

The Ars.2301 made its first flight on 29 November 1951, towed behind the Languedoc. During the following year Arsenal became SFECMAS (Société Française d’Etude et de Constructions de Matériel Aéronautiques Spéciaux), which affiliated with SCAN on 1 January 1953, and the Arsenal 2301 became the SFECMAS 2301 or sometimes the SFECMAS Ars.2301. The rocket fighter project was dropped in favour of a delta wing fighter design that would become Jean Gaultier's Nord Gerfaut. The original swept wing of the Ars.2301 was replaced by a pure, aerodynamically thin delta designated SFECMAS 1301; otherwise, initially, the aircraft was unchanged. making its first flight on 16 January 1953. The details of its development are obscure but photographs show that the wing tips were slightly cropped. The tailplane was altered more, moved up the fin and made smaller and delta shaped; the Gerfaut's small delta tailplane was similar but clipped. In its final form the Ars.1301 had an even smaller delta fore-plane. Typically test flights were launched from the Languedoc at about 6,300 m (20,700 ft).

The Gerfaut first flew on 15 January 1954; in 1955 SFECMAS and SCAN were completely merged, becoming the nationalized Nord Aviation in 1958. The Nord Griffon, another Gaultier delta design, first flew on 1 September 1955; this had no tailplane but a delta fore-plane, similar to that on the final version of the Ars.1301.

== Variants ==
Arsenal 2301
Swept wing
SFECMAS 1301
Delta wing (same airframe as 2301)

== Specifications (SFECMAS 1301) ==
Data from Gaillard (1990), p.114

General characteristics

- Crew: One
- Length: 12.46 m (40 ft 11 in)
- Wingspan: 8.43 m (27 ft 8 in)
- Max takeoff weight: 1,340 kg (2,954 lb)
