= SFCA Lignel 31 =

1930s French racing aircraft

Lignel 31

General information
- Type: racer and aerobatic aircraft
- National origin: France
- Manufacturer: Société Française de Construction Aéronautique (SFCA)
- Designer: Jean Lignel
- Number built: 1

History
- First flight: 28 June 1939

The SFCA Lignel 31 was a French, single engine, low wing monoplane, one of a series of this type built by SFCA in the 1930s. It was capable of aerobatics but was primarily a racing aircraft.

== Specifications ==
Data from

General characteristics

- Crew: One
- Length: 5.86 m (19 ft 3 in)
- Wingspan: 6.85 m (22 ft 6 in)
- Height: 2.27 m (7 ft 5 in)
- Wing area: 6.70 m^{2} (72.1 sq ft)
- Empty weight: 580 kg (1,279 lb)
- Gross weight: 840 kg (1,852 lb)
- Powerplant: 1 × Renault 6Q-03 six cylinder, air-cooled, inverted, supercharged inline, 160 kW (220 hp)
- Propellers: 2-bladed variable pitch propeller

Performance

- Maximum speed: 420 km/h (260 mph, 230 kn)
- Range: 1,200 km (750 mi, 650 nmi)
