= Société Française de Construction Aéronautique =

Defunct French aircraft manufacturer

- Industry: Aeronautics, defence
- Founded: 24 July 1934
- Founder: André Maillet
- Fate: Merged
- Headquarters: Buc, France
- Products: Aircraft

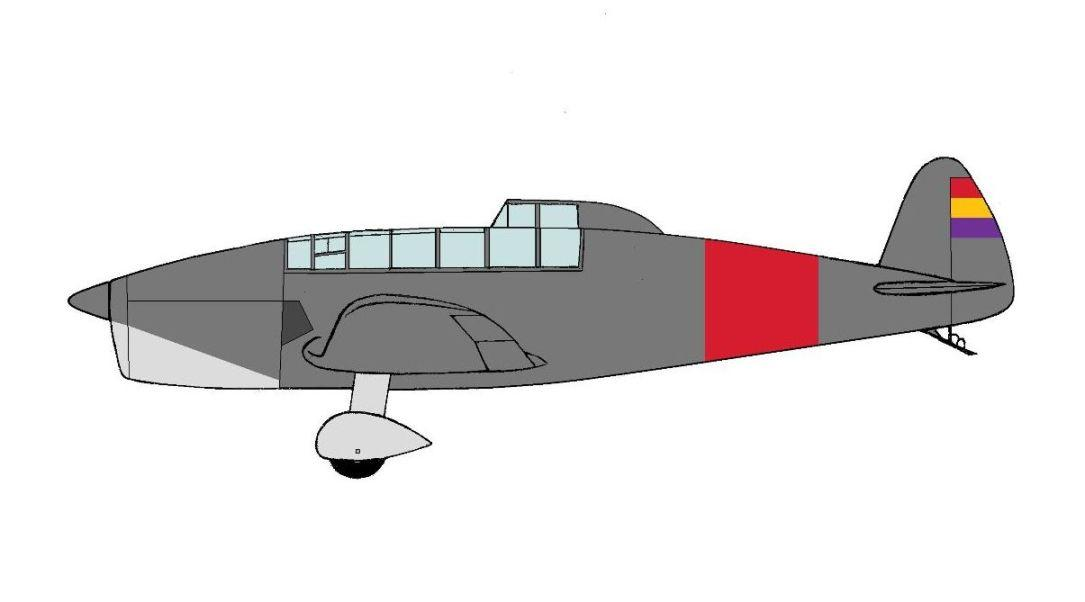
SFCA Maillet 21 of the Spanish Republican Air Force.

The Société Française de Construction Aéronautique (SFCA) was an aircraft manufacturing company based in Buc, France.

== History ==
The Société Française de Construction Aéronautique was established on the 24 July 1934 by André Maillet. Most of the aircraft produced by SFCA were light aircraft and trainers.

== Aircraft ==
- SFCA Lignel 10
- SFCA Lignel 16
- SFCA Lignel 161
- SFCA Lignel 20
- SFCA Lignel 20S
- SFCA Lignel 31
- SFCA Lignel 44
- SFCA Lignel 46 Coach
- SFCA Maillet 20
- SFCA Maillet 201
- SFCA Maillet 21
- SFCA Maillet-Lignel 20
- SFCA Taupin
- SFCA Taupin 5/2
