= SFAN 11 =

1940s French aircraft

General information
- Type: Observation aircraft
- National origin: France
- Manufacturer: SFAN
- Number built: 1

History
- First flight: 13 January 1940

The SFAN 11 was an observation aircraft built in France in the early 1940s.

It was a two-seat, high-wing monoplane with a twin tail, and powered by a 220 hp (160 kW) Renault 6Q engine, designed to meet a 1938 French requirement for an observation and artillery liaison aircraft capable of Short takeoff and landing.

== Specifications ==
Data from

General characteristics

- Crew: 2
- Length: 5.20 m (17 ft 1 in)
- Wingspan: 7.20 m (23 ft 7 in)
- Powerplant: 1 × Renault 6Q-01 6-cylinder piston engine, 160 kW (220 hp)
- Propellers: 2-bladed fixed pitchpropeller

Performance
