= Arsenal VG-33 =

French fighter aircraft

VG-33
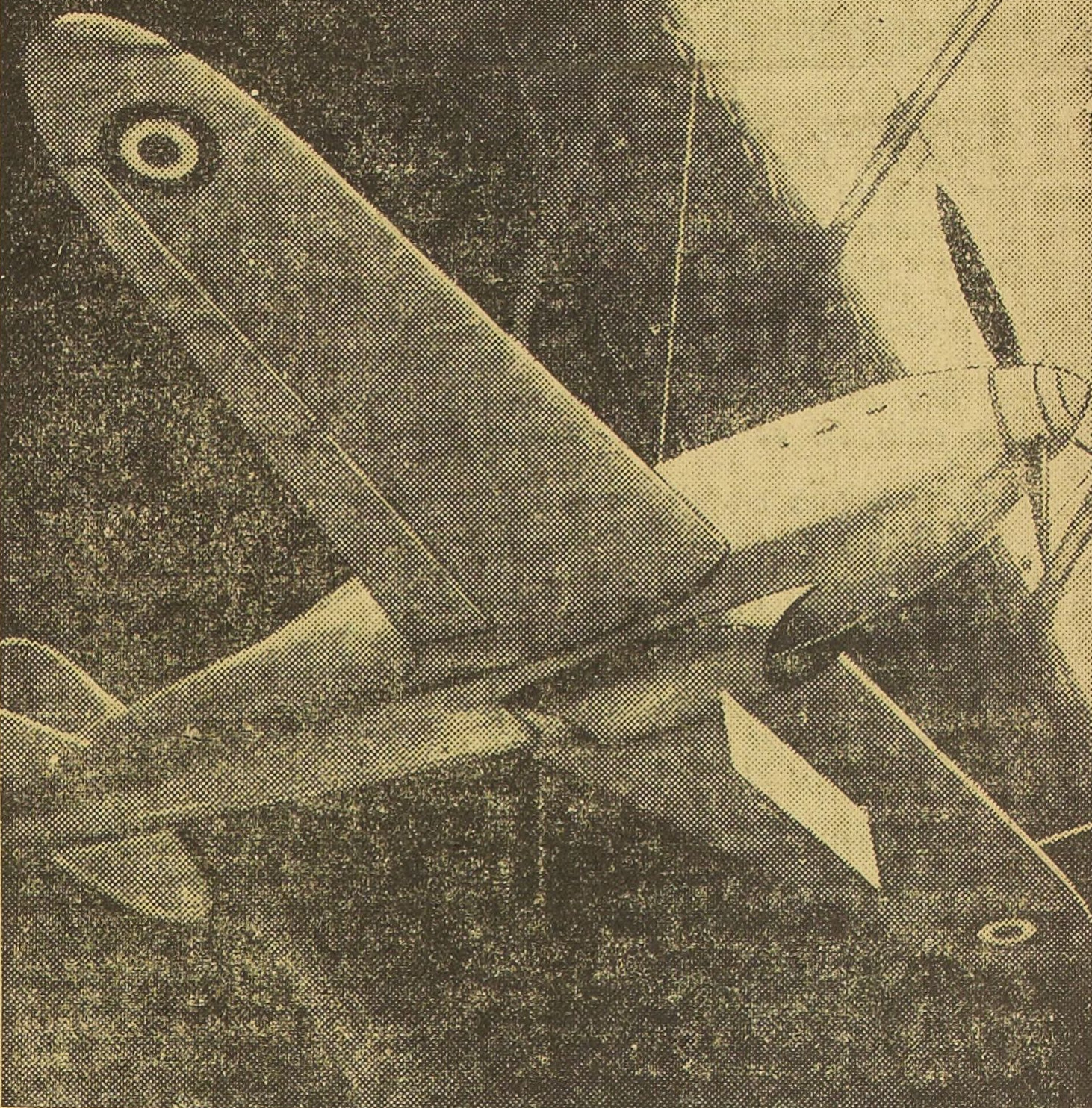
- Arsenal VG-30 prototype at Paris Air Show 1938

General information
- Type: Fighter
- Manufacturer: Arsenal de l'Aéronautique
- Designer: Jean Galtier
- Primary users: Armée de l'Air Luftwaffe
- Number built: <50

History
- Introduction date: 1940
- First flight: 25 April 1939

The Arsenal VG-33 was one of a series of fast French light fighter aircraft under development at the start of World War II, but which matured too late to see extensive service in the French Air Force during the Battle of France.

== Development ==
The original specification that led to the VG series was offered in 1936 in order to quickly raise the number of modern aircraft in French service, by supplying a "light fighter" of wooden construction that could be built rapidly in large numbers. The contract resulted in three designs, the VG-30, the Caudron C.714 and the Bloch MB.700. Prototypes of all three were ordered.

Named for engineer Michel Vernisse (V) and designer Jean Galtier (G), the VG-30 was all wooden in construction, using plywood over stringers in a semi-monocoque construction. The layout was conventional, a low-wing monoplane that bore a striking resemblance to the later Italian Macchi C.202. Armament consisted of a 20 mm Hispano-Suiza HS.404 engine-mount moteur-canon firing through the propeller hub, and four 7.5 mm MAC 1934 M39 drum-fed machine guns, two in each wing. The design was supposed to be powered by the Potez 12Dc flat-12 air-cooled inline engine, but this ran into development problems. The prototype was then fitted with a Hispano-Suiza 12Xcrs instead, and flew in this form in October 1938.

In order to find some solution to the engine problem, the VG-31 was to use the 632 kW (860 hp) Hispano-Suiza 12Y-31 and the VG-32 the Allison V-1710C-15. The VG-31 flew in 1939 and proved to have excellent performance. The prototype VG-32 was completed in 1940 and awaiting its test flight when it was captured by the advancing German forces at Villacoublay.

The VG-33 was a modified version of the VG-31 using the same 12Y-31, and first flew on April 25, 1939. It had a surprisingly good performance of 560 km/h (348 mph), and was ordered into production with a contract for 220 aircraft in September, later raised to 1,000. Production did not take long to start, but most of the airframes never received engines and sat at the factory when it fell to the Germans.

Further developments continued while the VG-33 production started. The VG-34 mounted the newer 688 kW (935 hp) 12Y-45, the VG-36 used the 735 kW (1,000 hp) 12Y-51 originally intended for the VG-35, and introduced a new streamlined radiator bath that looked similar to the one on the P-51 Mustang. Single prototypes of all three were built and flown in early 1940. The VG-37 was an extended-range version of the -36, while the VG-38 was to have used the 12Y-77, but neither was built.

The last in the series was the VG-39, originally powered by the new 882 kW (1,200 hp) 12Y-89 using an extension shaft on the propeller to streamline the nose profile, giving the plane an excellent speed of 625 km/h (388 mph) even when loaded down with two more machine guns. The actual production version was to have been the VG-39bis, powered by the new 1177 kW (1,600 hp) Hispano-Suiza 12Z-17, using the streamlined radiator intake design from the VG-36.

Two more designs were projected, both based on the VG-39bis airframe. The VG-40 mounted the Rolls-Royce Merlin III and the VG-50 the newer Allison V-1710-39. Neither was built.

== Operational history ==
The continual production problems that plagued the VG-33 meant that it never took part in combat. Only 19 aircraft, out of about 40 completed (and about 160 close to completion), had been received by the Armée de l'Air by the time of Armistice. Only two machines ever flew in an active unit – GC 1/55 which commenced operations under chaotic conditions, four days before the armistice.

Although the VG-33 used an older, less powerful version of the Dewoitine D.520's engine, the VG-33 prototypes could climb faster than the D.520, and their respective top speeds were comparable.

While it was under-armed in comparison to the Messerschmitt Bf 109, the VG-33 could have matched it in speed and maneuverability below 5,000 metres. As was also the case with the D.520, the limitations of the supercharger used meant that the VG-33 could not match the speed of the Bf 109 above 5,000 m.

The Germans captured four VG-33s, and one of them was tested by the Luftwaffe at Rechlin in late 1940.

== Variants ==
- VG-30 – The original powerplant was the Potez 12Dc flat-12 air-cooled inline engine, but the prototype was fitted with a Hispano-Suiza 12Xcrs, and flew in this form in October 1938.
- VG-31 – prototype with reduced wing surface and radiator moved back.
- VG-32 – Allison V-1710C-15-powered prototype.
- VG-33 – First production model with Hispano-Suiza 12Y-31 engine (160 near completion at Fall of France. Unknown number completed.)
- VG-34 – 679 kW (910 hp) Hispano-Suiza 12Y-45 engine. 357 mph (575 km/h). Prototype only.
- VG-35 – VG-33 variant with 746 kW (1,000 hp) Hispano-Suiza 12Y-51 engine. One built.
- VG-36 – VG-35 variant with new radiator and new canopy. Prototype only.
- VG-37 – Extended-range version of the VG-36. Not built.
- VG-38 – projected for Hispano-Suiza 12Y-77 engine. Not built.
- VG-39 – 895 kW (1,200 hp) Hispano-Suiza 12Z engine. 388 mph (625 km/h). 6 machine guns. Prototype only.
- VG-39bis – proposed production version powered by a Hispano-Suiza 12Z.
- VG-40 – projected variant powered by a Rolls-Royce Merlin III.
- VG-50 – projected variant powered by an Allison V-1710-39. (N.B. The designation VG 50 was also used for a projected four-engined transatlantic transport)
- VG-60 – The ultimate projected variant powered by a 1,000 hp Hispano-Suiza 12Y-51 supercharged by a two-stage Sidlowsky-Planiol turbocharger.

== Operators ==
France

- Armée de l'Air – out of 19 VG-33s completed, eight were officially delivered.

Germany

- Luftwaffe – used a single VG-33 for testing purposes.

== Specifications (VG-33) ==
Data from

General characteristics

- Crew: 1
- Length: 8.55 m (28 ft 1 in)
- Wingspan: 10.8 m (35 ft 5 in)
- Height: 3.31 m (10 ft 10 in)
- Wing area: 14 m^{2} (150 sq ft)
- Empty weight: 1,719 kg (3,790 lb)
- Gross weight: 2,448 kg (5,397 lb)
- Powerplant: 1 × Hispano-Suiza 12Y-31 V-12 liquid-cooled piston engine, 641 kW (860 hp)

Performance

- Maximum speed: 554 km/h (344 mph, 299 kn)
- Range: 1,200 km (750 mi, 650 nmi)
- Service ceiling: 11,000 m (36,000 ft)
- Wing loading: 175 kg/m^{2} (36 lb/sq ft)
- Power/mass: 0.26 kW/kg (0.159 hp/lb)

Armament

- 1 × 20 mm Hispano-Suiza HS.404 cannon
- 4 × 7.5 mm MAC 1934 machine guns

== See also ==
Aircraft of comparable role, configuration, and era

- Dewoitine D.520
- Messerschmitt Bf 109E

Related lists

- List of aircraft of the French Air Force during World War II
- List of aircraft of World War II
- List of military aircraft of France
