= Arsenal de l'Aéronautique =

National military aircraft manufacturer

- Industry: Aeronautics, defence
- Founded: 1936
- Founder: French Air Ministry (Ministère de l'Air)
- Defunct: 1955
- Fate: Merged
- Successor: Nord Aviation
- Headquarters: Villacoublay, France
- Products: Aircraft

Arsenal de l'Aéronautique (commonly named Arsenal) was a national military aircraft manufacturer established by the French Government in 1936 at Villacoublay. In the years before World War II, it developed a range of technically advanced fighter aircraft, but none of these were manufactured in sufficient quantities to be of any use against the German invasion. Following the war, Arsenal was relocated to Châtillon-sous-Bagneux, where it was privatised as SFECMAS (la Société Française d’Etude et de Constructions de Matériel Aéronautiques Spéciaux) in 1952. In 1955 SFECMAS joined SNCAN to create Nord Aviation.

== Aircraft ==
Arsenal VG 30
(1938) Single-engine one-seat low-wing monoplane propeller-engine fighter aircraft. One prototype built
Arsenal VG 31
VG-30 variant powered by Hispano-Suiza engine. One built
Arsenal VG 32
VG-30 variant powered by Allison engine. One built
Arsenal VG-33
Production version of VG-32
Arsenal VG-34
VG-33 variant with newer engine. One built
Arsenal VG-35
VG-33 variant with newer engine. One built
Arsenal VG-36
VG-33 variant with newer engine and modified radiator housing. One built
Arsenal VG-37
Proposed VG-33 variant with longer range. Not built
Arsenal VG-38
Proposed VG-33 variant with newer engine. Not built
Arsenal VG-39
VG-36 variant with more streamlined nose and larger engine. One built
Arsenal VG-40
VG-39 variant with Rolls-Royce engine. Not built
Arsenal VG-50
VG-39 variant with Allison engine. Not built
Arsenal VB 10
(1945) Two-engine single-seat propeller fighter aircraft with fore-and-aft engines. Six built
Arsenal O.101
(1947) Single-engine two-seat low-wing aerodynamic research aircraft. One built
Arsenal VG 70
(1948) Single-engine one-seat high-wing swept-wing jet experimental aircraft. One built
Arsenal VG 80
Arsenal VG 90
(1949) Single-engine one-seat high-wing swept-wing carrier-based jet fighter. Three built; two completed
Arsenal-Delanne 10

== Aero engines ==
=== Arsaéro ===
Arsenal 12H
Postwar French development of the Junkers Jumo 213 V-12 engine.
Arsenal 12H-Tandem
2x 12H engines in tandem driving co-axial propellers.
Arsenal 12K
Further development of the 12H.
Arsenal 24H
A 24-cylinder H-24 engine utilising 12H cylinder blocks, crankshafts and pistons mounted on a new crankcase driving a single propeller.
Arsenal 24H-Tandem
2x 24H engines in tandem driving co-axial propellers.

== Gliders ==
Arsenal O.101
Air 100
Air 101
Air 102
Air 4111
Arsenal Emouchet
Arsenal 1301
supersonic research glider
Arsenal 2301
supersonic research glider

== Targets and missiles ==
Arsenal 5201
(SS 10 (sol-sol))
Arsenal AS 10
(ALAT (AAM))
Arsenal 5501
(CT 10 target)
Arsenal 5510
(CT 20 target)
Nord SM 20
(sol-mer anti-shipping)
Nord CT 41
(supersonic target)

== See also ==
- French space program
- CNES
