= SFCA Maillet 20 =

1930s French light aircraft

Maillet 20
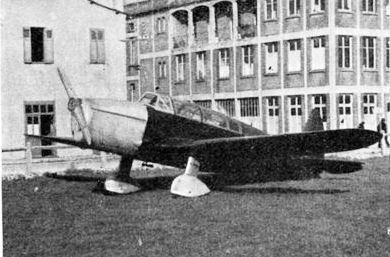

General information
- Type: Three seat tourer
- National origin: France
- Manufacturer: Société Francaise de Constructions Aéronautiques (SFCA)
- Designer: Jean Lignel
- Number built: c.37 (all versions)

History
- First flight: 24 March 1935

The SFCA Maillet 20 was a French three seat tourer built in 1935. The Armée de l'Air ordered 30 for training and liaison and several were raced. The aircraft was developed through 1935 via cockpit layout and canopy changes to the provision of retracting landing gear.

== Design and development ==
The Société Francaise de Constructions Aéronautiques (SFCA) was set up in July 1934 to build light aircraft designed by André Maillet, though Maillet was killed in an aircraft accident on 30 June 1934. The company's first design, the Maillet 20, was a direct development of the earlier Maillet-Nening MN-A, Maillet-Nening or Maillet 01 built by Maillet and Nening, respectively chief pilot and chief engineer at the Roland Garros Aero Club, which undertook its first test flights in December 1933. Both aircraft were three seat, low wing monoplanes powered by Régnier 6 inverted inline engines.

The cantilever wing of the Maillet 20 was an all-wood, two spar structure with plywood skin, finished with an outer fabric layer. It had a rectangular centre section and tapered outer panels with dihedral, ending at semi-elliptical tips. The inner wing carried split flaps.

The fuselage structure was also wooden, with an oval cross-section and was ply and fabric covered like the wings. Its 130 kW (180 hp), air-cooled, inverted six-cylinder inline Regnier R 6 was in the nose, driving a two blade, variable pitch propeller and with its fuel stored in the fuselage. There were three seats in tandem, with the pilot in front; dual control could be fitted and there was luggage space behind the third seat, large enough to hold three suitcases. The seats were enclosed under continuous multi-panel glazing which ran unbroken into the raised top of the rear fuselage, coupé fashion.

The rear surfaces were constructed like the wings; the tailplane, attached halfway up the fuselage, could be adjusted on the ground and carried elevators with cut-outs for movement of a rounded, unbalanced rudder which reached down to the keel. The fin was straight-edged and round-topped.

Though the MN-A and the Maillet 20 had much in common, one obvious difference was in the landing gear. Both designs had mainwheels on vertical legs from the outer part of the wing inner section but the earlier model also had diagonal V-struts from axles to lower fuselage, whereas those of the Maillet 20 were cantilevers, without struttage. The legs had Messier oleo shock absorbers and mounted the wheels in forks. Both legs and wheels were enclosed in fairings.

The Maillet 20 first flew on 24 March 1935, piloted by Louis Massotte. Two were built. The Armée de l'Air bought 30 examples of a very similar trainer version, fitted with automatic two speed propellers, designated the Maillet 201.

More distinct was the Maillet 21, a rebuild of the second Maillet 20 under construction in May 1935, with the pilot in the rearmost seat; this allowed the forward glazing to be lowered and faired smoothly into the forward fuselage. The pilot's seat was raised with a clear forward view through a small windscreen in a head-wide, faired, part glazed dorsal enclosure. A metal, variable pitch propeller improved the take-off performance and the Maillet 21 was expected to clear a 30 m (98 ft) obstacle 600 m (2,000 ft) from the start of its run. It was flying by July 1935.

Towards the end of 1935 the SFCA produced a version of the Maillet 21 fitted with a retractable undercarriage and named the Maillet-Lignel 20. The legs were mounted at the same positions on the centre sections as with the earlier models but retracted into the outer wing panels. Five were built.

== Operational history ==
Two Maillets competed in the July 1935 12 heures d'Angers, one at least a Maillet 21. One dropped out and the other, flown by de la Combe, came sixth.

In the first Hélène Boucher Cup race for female pilots, contested on 31 August 1935, Claire Roman finished second in a Maillet 21. Mlle Jourjon competed in the Maillet 20. In the 1936 event Roman was second again in the same aircraft, followed in third place by Yvonne Jourjon in a Maillet 20.

After the breakout of the Spanish Civil War, at least one Maillet 21 ended up in the Spanish Republican Air Force where it was used as a trainer.

== Variants ==
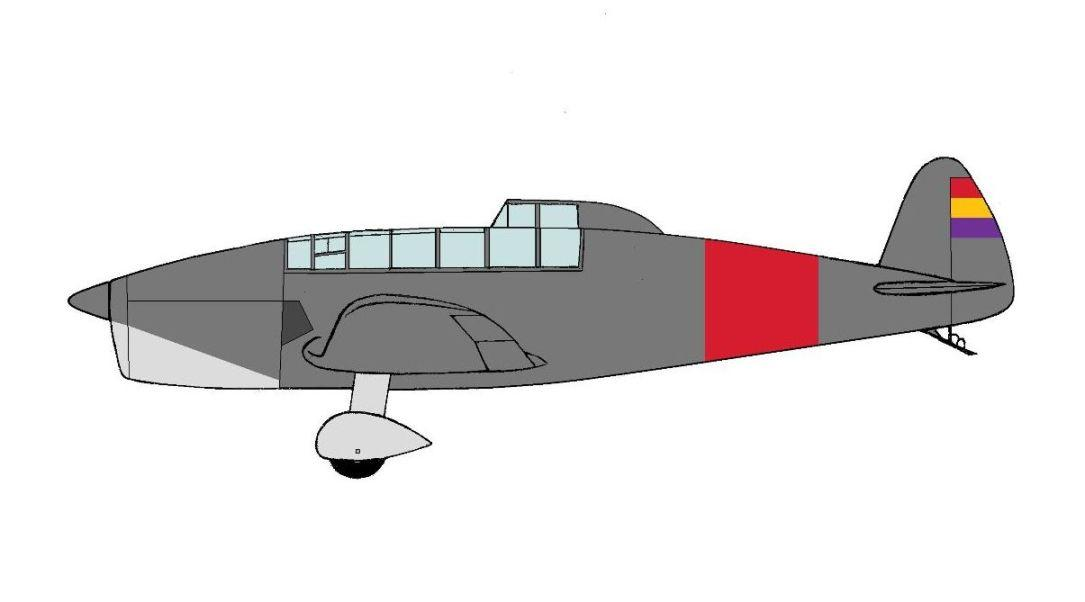
SFCA Maillet-21 of the Spanish Republican Air Force

Maillet 20
Prototype; two built.
Maillet 201
Production trainer version; thirty built for l'Armée del'Air.
Maillet 21
Second Maillet 20 modified with relocated pilot's seat and more streamlined canopy.
Maillet-Lignel 20
Maillet 21 with retractable undercarriage; five built.

== Specifications (Maillet 20) ==
Data from L'Année Aéronautique 1934–1935, p.22

General characteristics

- Crew: One
- Capacity: Two passengers
- Length: 8 m (26 ft 3 in)
- Wingspan: 10 m (32 ft 10 in)
- Height: 2.20 m (7 ft 3 in)
- Wing area: 15 m^{2} (160 sq ft)
- Empty weight: 642 kg (1,415 lb)
- Gross weight: 1,130 kg (2,491 lb)
- Fuel capacity: 90 kg (200 lb) fuel plus oil
- Powerplant: 1 × Regnier R 6 air cooled, inverted six-cylinder inline, 130 kW (180 hp)
- Propellers: 2-bladed Levasseur, 2.05 m (6 ft 9 in) diameter

Performance

- Maximum speed: 261 km/h (162 mph, 141 kn) at ground level
- Cruise speed: 250 km/h (160 mph, 130 kn) at 80% power
- Range: 916 km (569 mi, 495 nmi) with a 50 km (31 mi) wind allowance
- Service ceiling: 6,500 m (21,300 ft)
- Rate of climb: 1.3 m/s (260 ft/min) initial
- Landing speed: 65 km/h (40 mph; 35 kn)

== Bibliography ==
- Cortet, Pierre (January 1998). "Rétros du Mois" [Retros of the Month]. Avions: Toute l'aéronautique et son histoire (in French) (58): 4. ISSN 1243-8650.
