= Dive brake =

Method of slowing an aircraft

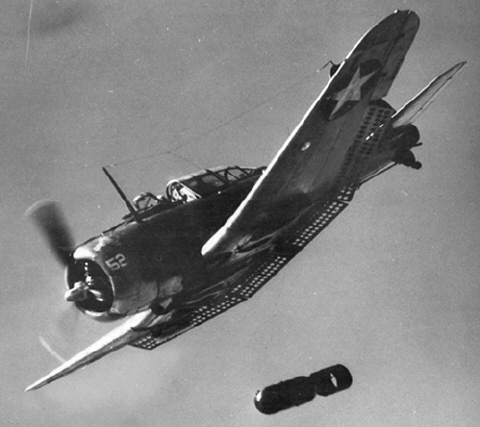
The dive brakes on this SBD Dauntless are the slotted panels visible under the wings.

Dive brakes or dive flaps are a type of flight control surface deployed to slow down an aircraft when it is in a dive. They often consist of a metal flap that is lowered against the air flow, thus creating drag and reducing dive speed.

In the past, dive brakes were mostly used on dive bombers, which needed to dive very steeply, but without exceeding their red line speed, in order to drop their bombs accurately. The airbrakes or spoilers fitted to gliders often function both as landing aids, to adjust the approach angle, and to keep the aircraft's speed below its maximum permissible indicated airspeed in a vertical dive. Most modern combat aircraft are equipped with air brakes, which perform the same function as dive brakes.

== Applications ==
- Aichi D3A
- Dornier Do 217 (attachable dorsal/ventral "petal" design at extreme rear of fuselage)
- Douglas SBD Dauntless
- Junkers Ju 87 (automatic air brakes that allowed the aircraft to pull out of a dive even if the pilot was rendered temporarily unconscious due to high g-forces)
- Northrop BT
- A-36 Invader
- SB2U Vindicator
- Blackburn Firebrand
