= Rolls-Royce Tay =

Rolls-Royce Tay is the name of two different jet engines:

- Rolls-Royce RB.44 Tay, an afterburning turbojet engine, based on the 1940s Rolls-Royce Nene
- Rolls-Royce RB.183 Tay, a twin-spool high bypass turbofan engine, first run in 1984
