= Grumman F9F Panther =

US Navy carrier-based jet fighter

F9F Panther
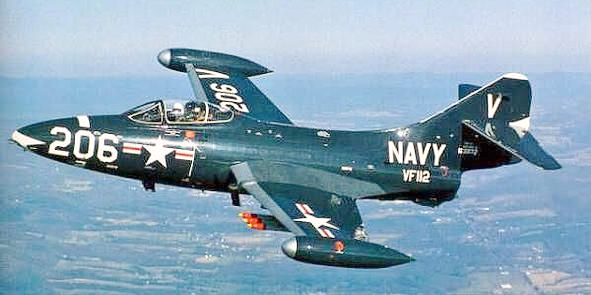
- An F9F Panther in flight

General information
- Type: Carrier-based fighter-bomber
- Manufacturer: Grumman
- Primary users: United States Navy United States Marine Corps; Argentine Navy
- Number built: 1,385

History
- Introduction date: May 1949
- First flight: 21 November 1947
- Retired: 1958, U.S. Navy; 1969, Argentina
- Developed into: Grumman F-9 Cougar

The Grumman F9F Panther is an early carrier-based jet fighter designed and produced by American aircraft manufacturer Grumman. It was the first jet-powered fighter aircraft to see air-to-air combat with the United States Navy, as well as being Grumman’s first jet fighter.

Development of the Panther commenced in the final months of World War II to harness the recent innovation of the jet engine. Grumman designed a single-engined, straight-winged day fighter that was armed with four 20 mm (0.79 in) cannons and could also carry a wide assortment of air-to-ground munitions. Production aircraft were typically powered by a single Allison J33 or Pratt & Whitney J48-P-2 turbojet engine. On 21 November 1947, the prototype performed its maiden flight, powered by an imported Rolls-Royce Nene engine. During September 1949, the F9F was cleared for flight from aircraft carriers.

The Panther was used extensively by the U.S. Navy and Marine Corps in the Korean War. On 3 July 1950, a F9F-3 recorded the first U.S. Navy air victory of the conflict, having shot down a propeller-powered Yak-9. In the Korean theater, Panther pilots cumulatively claimed the shooting down of seven Mikoyan-Gurevich MiG-15s. During 1956, the type was withdrawn from front-line combat service, but remained in secondary roles, such as for training and with U.S. Naval Air Reserve and U.S. Marine Air Reserve units, until 1958. The Panther was also the first jet aircraft used by the Blue Angels aerobatics demonstration team, being flown in this capacity from 1949 through to late 1954. Future astronauts Neil Armstrong and John Glenn both flew the F9F extensively during the Korean War.

While Australia was interested in the Panther during the late 1940s, the nation ultimately opted for the Gloster Meteor F.8 and the CAC Sabre, instead. The aircraft's only export customer was Argentina, where it became the first jet aircraft to be operated by the Argentine Naval Aviation. It was operated mainly from land, as the catapults of the aircraft carrier ARA Independencia lacked sufficient power to readily launch the F9F. Several Panthers participated in the 1963 Argentine Navy Revolt, firing upon Argentine Army forces sent to quell the revolt. During 1969, it was withdrawn from Argentine service due to a lack of spare parts.

Grumman went on to develop the F9F design in response to U.S. Navy interest, producing the swept wing Grumman F-9 Cougar.

== Design and development ==
=== Background ===
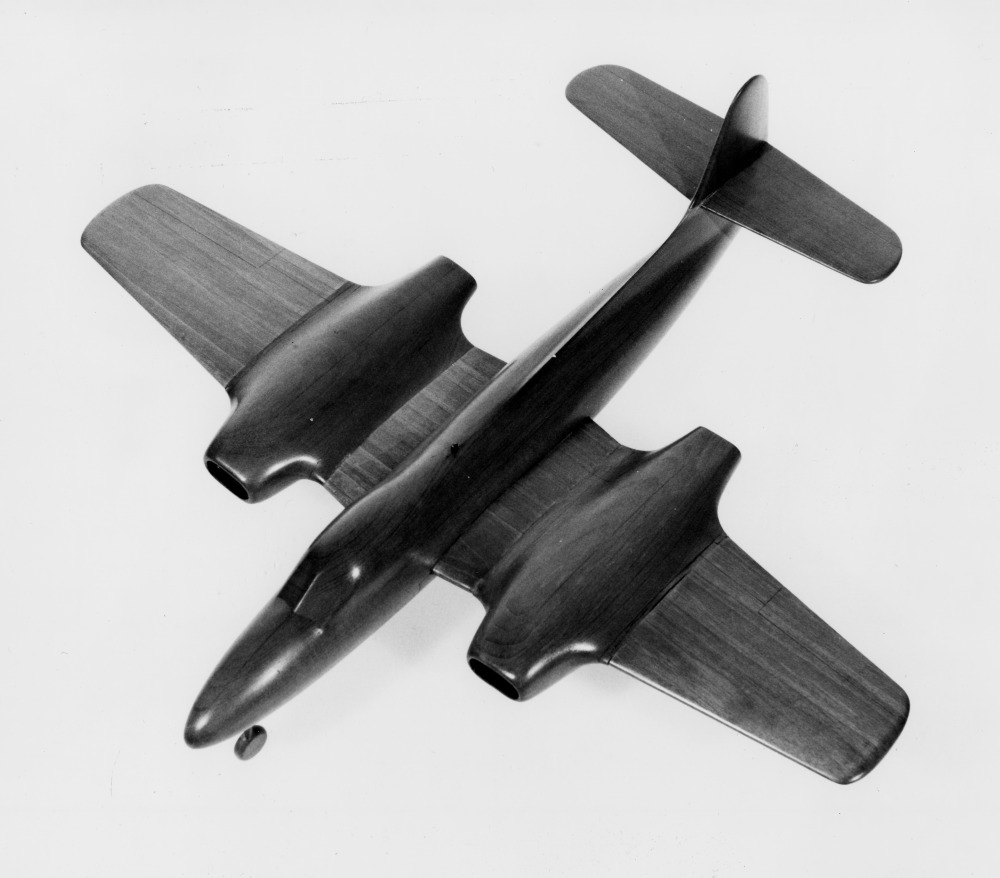
Manufacturer's model of the G-75 (XF9F-1)

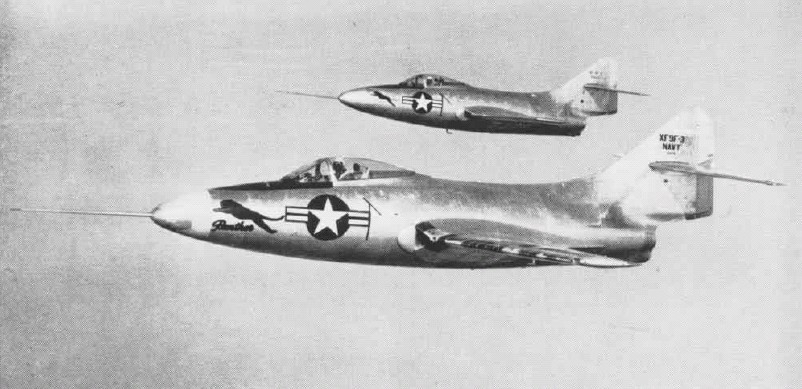
The XF9F-2 and XF9F-3 prototypes in 1948

The origins of the Panther can be traced back to development studies performed by Grumman into jet-powered fighter aircraft near the end of World War II. The company was keen to capitalize on the emergence of the first practical jet engines by integrating them into a new aircraft design. This design, which was internally designated G-75, was submitted to a U.S. Navy competition that sought a jet-powered night fighter to equip its aircraft carriers with. However, on 3 April 1946, it announced that the Douglas F3D Skyknight, a competing two-seat aircraft powered by four Westinghouse J30 turbojets, had been selected. On 11 April 1946, the Navy's Bureau of Aeronautics (BuAer) issued a development contract to Grumman to produce a pair of G-75 prototypes, which were given the Navy designation XF9F-1, in case development of the Skyknight encountered severe problems.

Shortly thereafter, Grumman recognized that the G-75 did not have much potential for either performance or growth; the company had already undertaken work on a completely different single-engined day fighter, the G-79. In a bureaucratic maneuver, BuAer opted not to cancel the G-75 contract, but instead changed the wording to include three prototypes of the entirely different G-79; this design became the Panther.

At that time, the few American engines that were available for use, such as the Allison J33 and Westinghouse J34, were not considered to be sufficiently reliable; thus, the Navy specified the imported Rolls-Royce Nene turbojet, which was also more powerful, at 5,000 lbf (22 kN) of thrust. Production aircraft were to also be powered by the Nene, built under license by Pratt & Whitney as the J42. Since space was insufficient within the wings and fuselage to provide sufficient fuel for the thirsty jet engine, the design team opted to add permanently mounted wingtip fuel tanks, which had the incidental advantage of improving the fighter's rate of roll. The wings featured another innovation in the form of leading edge flaps that generated additional lift while landing; speed brakes were also present on the underside of the fuselage.

=== Flight testing ===
On 21 November 1947, the prototype Panther conducted its maiden flight, piloted by test pilot Corky Meyer. It was followed by the second prototype only five days later. Initial issues with directional and longitudinal stability were encountered, but were quickly rectified. During one early land-based arresting gear test, the detachable rear section of the aircraft unintentionally came off; remedial changes were made to avoid any future repetition.

In May 1949, carrier suitability trials commenced. In September 1949, the F9F was cleared for flight from aircraft carriers. During the development phase, Grumman decided to change the Panther's engine, selecting the Pratt & Whitney J48-P-2, a license-built version of the Rolls-Royce RB.44 Tay. The other engine that had been tested was the Allison J33-A-16. The armament was a quartet of 20 mm guns, the Navy having already switched to this caliber (as opposed to the USAAF/USAF, which continued to use .50 caliber M2/M3 guns). In addition, the Panther was soon armed with underwing air-to-ground rockets and up to 2,000 lb (910 kg) of bombs.

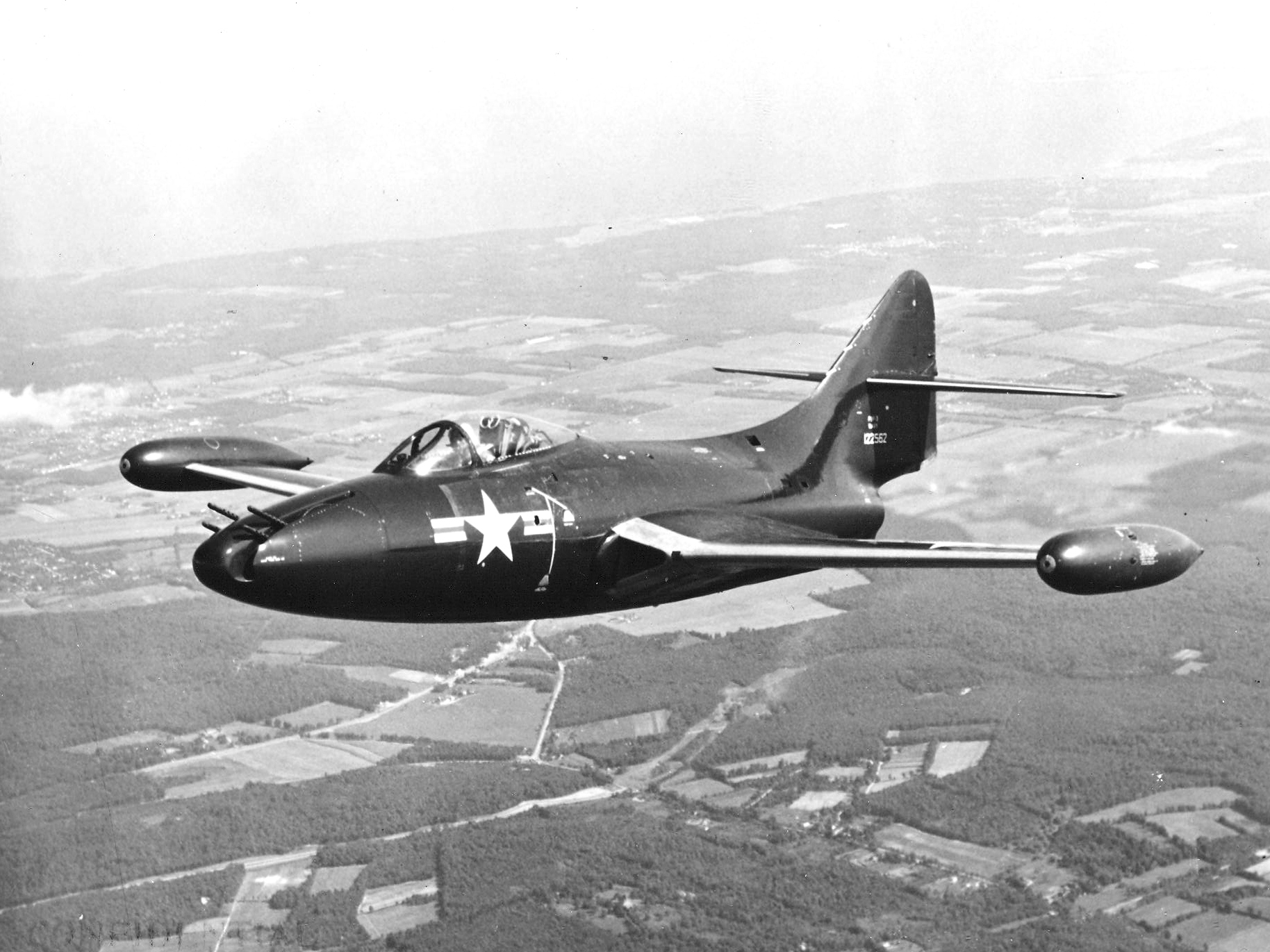
An F9F-3 Panther fitted with an experimental Emerson turret housing four 12.7 mm machine guns, in 1950

From 1946, interest in developing an aircraft that harnessed the increasingly popular swept wing grew, and following concerns that the Panther was inferior to its MiG opponents over the skies of Korea, Grumman launched work on a conversion project, known as Design 93. This effort resulted in a swept-wing derivative, the F9F Cougar, which retained the Panther's designation number. Later-stage development work on the Panther continued, being largely focused on engine improvements, expanding fuel capacity, and the use of alternative munitions.

In 1949, the Panther was considered by the Australian government, as a possible locally built replacement for the Mustang Mk 23 and De Havilland Vampire then operated by the Royal Australian Air Force (RAAF). The other designs considered initially were an Australian design, the CAC CA-23 (an unconventional, twin-jet all-weather fighter) and the Hawker P.1081. By mid-1950, however, RAAF Mustangs were in action in Korea and seen as highly vulnerable to the MiG-15. An immediately available stop-gap in the shape of the Gloster Meteor F.8 was operated by the RAAF in Korea from July 1951. (After its less-than-satisfactory performance against MiGs, the Meteor was replaced from 1954 by the CAC Sabre – an Australian-built, up-engined variant of the F-86.)

== Operational history ==
=== US Navy ===
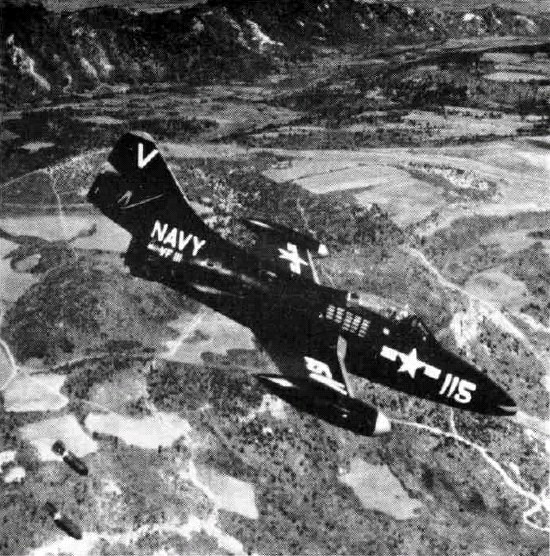
A VF-111 F9F-2 dropping bombs in Korea, 1951/52

==== Korean War ====
The Panther was the primary jet fighter and ground-attack aircraft of both the US Navy and USMC during the Korean War. It was the most widely used Navy jet fighter of the conflict, cumulatively flying 78,000 sorties for the United Nations Command. F9F-2s, F9F-3s, and F9F-5s, as rugged attack aircraft, were able to sustain operations despite being frequently opposed by intense antiaircraft fire. The pilots also appreciated the air-conditioned cockpit, which made for a welcome change from the humid environment of piston-powered aircraft.

On 3 July 1950, Lieutenant JG Leonard H. Plog, of VF-51, flying an F9F-3, scored the first US Navy air victory of the war by shooting down a propeller-powered Yak-9.

Despite their relatively low speed, Panther pilots also claimed seven Mikoyan-Gurevich MiG-15s, for the loss of two F9Fs. The first MiG-15 was downed on 9 November 1950, by Lieutenant Commander William (Bill) Amen of VF-111 flying an F9F-2B, during an attack on the Sinuiju bridges, near the mouth of the Yalu River. Two more MiG-15s were downed on 18 November 1950.

As the conflict progressed, Panthers became primarily tasked with ground-attack missions. Attacks upon hostile antiaircraft (AA) equipment were commonly conducted. This was a risky mission type, with numerous Panthers being damaged or even lost to fire from the same ground batteries that they were seeking to neutralize. Furthermore, the danger posed by these systems increased over time as more capable AA apparatus was supplied to the North Korean force. Panthers also routinely undertook aerial reconnaissance missions over Korea. Starting in 1952, the Panther began to be supplemented by the newer Cougar derivative in the theatre.

Future astronaut Neil Armstrong flew the F9F extensively during the Korean conflict, although he ejected from one of the aircraft after it was brought down by a wire strung across a valley in 1951. Future astronaut John Glenn and Boston Red Sox all-star baseball player Ted Williams also flew the F9F as Marine Corps pilots.

===== Engagement with Soviet aircraft =====
On 18 November 1952, USS Oriskany and three other US carriers were operating in the Sea of Japan, conducting air strikes against the North Korean city of Hoeryong. The task group launched four F9Fs for a combat patrol near the North Korean border with China, including Lt Royce Williams and his wingman, of VF-781, flying off Oriskany. The patrol leader suffered mechanical problems, so his wingman and he returned to their carrier. Lt Williams and his wingman continued on the mission. They sighted seven Soviet Naval Aviation MiG-15s heading towards the task force from the Russian mainland. The task force commander, therefore, ordered the two F9Fs to take position between the MiGs and the carrier group.

The USSR was officially neutral in the Korean War, but four of the MiGs fired on the US planes, anyway. Williams opened fire on the tail MiG, which dropped out of formation and was followed down by Williams's wingman. What followed was a 35-minute dogfight between Williams and the six MiGs. The MiG-15 was a more capable plane, but Williams nevertheless shot down three more. He ascribed this to both sides doing as they were trained, but the Soviet pilots making mistakes. While heading back to Oriskany, Williams was out of ammunition, but still had one MiG on his tail. The reappearance of his wingman on the MiG's tail then scared that one off. Williams's plane was so damaged that he could not turn. Oriskany had to come to the same course as the plane, so he could land. After landing, his Panther was found to have 263 hits by cannon shells or fragments and was beyond repair, so it was pushed overboard.

This action was kept secret for two reasons. The US feared that publicizing it could increase tensions with the Soviet Union and possibly lead to open Soviet participation in the war. Another reason was the involvement of the US National Security Agency (NSA) – the existence of which was then top secret – in planning the mission; the MiGs were intercepted as a result of intelligence provided by the NSA. The four MiGs that were shot down were flown by Soviet Naval Aviation pilots: Russian sources confirmed Williams's claims, 40 years later, stating the pilots lost were Captains Belyakov and Vandalov, and Lieutenants Pakhomkin and Tarshinov.

==== Post-Korean War service ====
During 1956, the Panther was withdrawn from frontline combat service, having been displaced by new fighter aircraft, including its swept-wing Cougar derivative. However, the type remained active in secondary roles, such as for training and with U.S. Naval Air Reserve and U.S. Marine Air Reserve units, until 1958. The Navy's Blue Angels flight demonstration team used the Panther for four years, beginning in 1951. The Panther was the Blue Angels' first jet. Some Panthers continued to serve in small numbers into the 1960s. From September 1962, surviving operational Panthers were designated F-9 within the new combined US tri-service designation system.

=== Argentine Navy ===
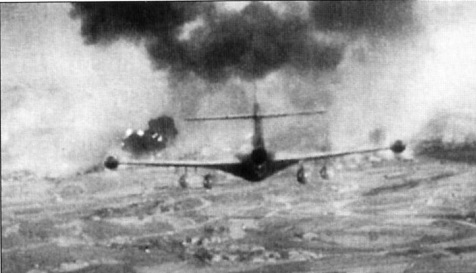
Argentine Panther attacks Army column during the 1963 Argentine Navy revolt

The only foreign buyer of the Panther was the Argentine Naval Aviation, which purchased 28 ex-USN F9F-2B aircraft during 1957; the first 10 arrived in 1958. Only 24 aircraft were put in service, as the remainder were used as spares. The first flight of an Argentine Panther was in December 1958, and the last aircraft entered into service during January 1961.

The catapult on the then-only Argentine carrier, ARA Independencia, was not powerful enough to launch the F9F, so the aircraft were land-based. However, in July 1963, a Panther (serial 0453/3-A-119) landed on Independencia as part of trials, the first jet to land on an Argentine aircraft carrier. It was not then catapult-launched, but off-loaded by crane when the ship returned to port.

Argentine Navy F9F-2 Panthers were engaged in combat during the 1963 Argentine Navy Revolt. Several rebel-controlled aircraft flew bombing and strafing runs against a column of the Army 8th Tank Regiment, which was advancing on the rebelling Punta Indio Naval Air Base. The attack destroyed several M4 Sherman tanks, while one F9F Panther was shot down.

The Argentine Panthers were involved in the general mobilization during the 1965 border clash between Argentina and Chile, but no combat occurred. The type was removed from service during 1969 due to a lack of available spare parts; the service opted to replace them with Douglas A-4Q Skyhawks.

The Argentine Navy also operated the F-9 Cougar trainer version.

== Variants ==
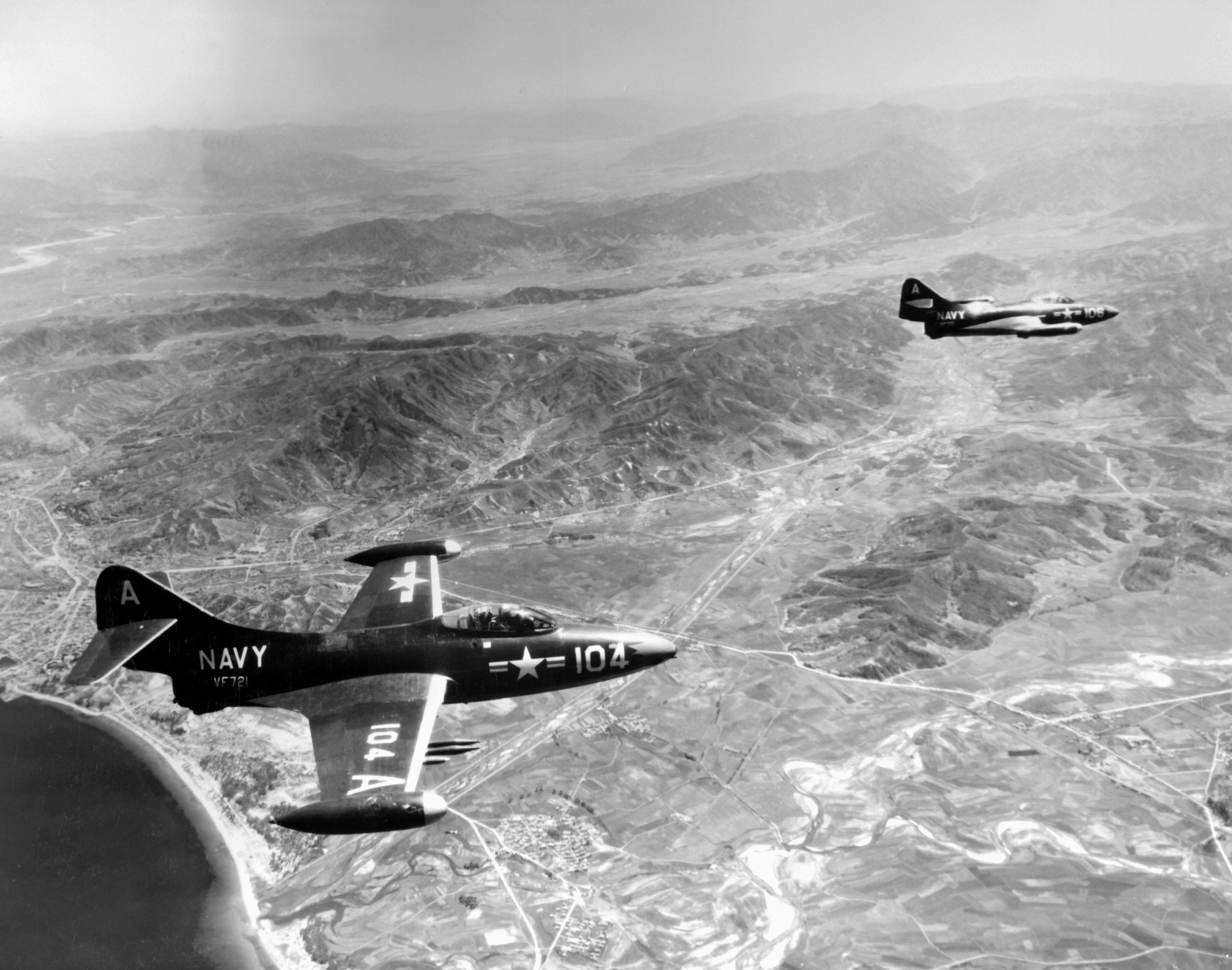
Two F9F-2Bs of VF-721 over Korea.

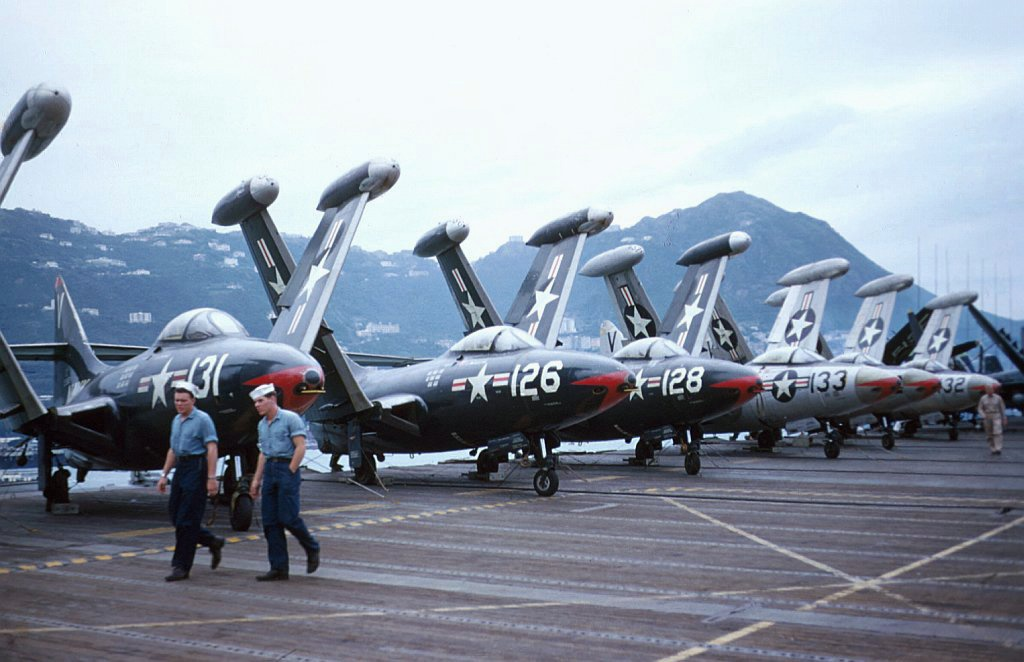
F9F-5s of VF-111 on USS Lake Champlain in 1953.

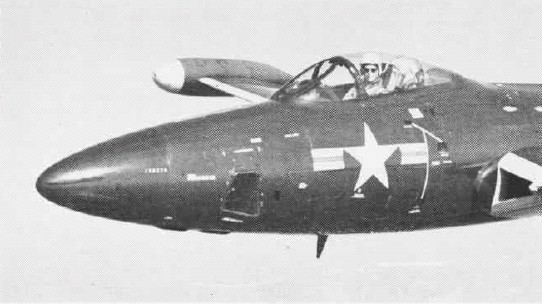
F9F-5P reconnaissance aircraft

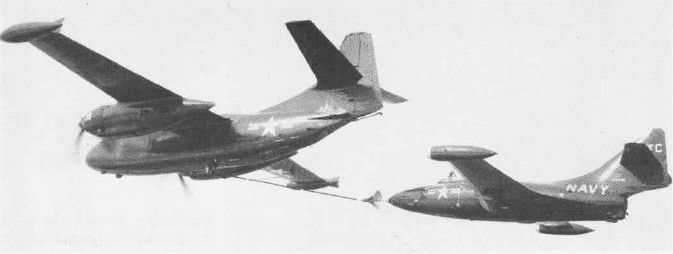
F9F and AJ Savage of the NATC during in-flight refueling tests in 1953

XF9F-1
Four-engined night-fighter; contract converted to XF9F-2 before any built.
XF9F-2
Single-engined day fighter prototypes, two built.
F9F-2
First production version, powered by Pratt & Whitney J42 engine, 567 built.
F9F-2B
Version fitted with underwing racks for bombs and rockets. As all F9F-2s were brought up to this standard, the B designation was dropped.
F9F-2P
Unarmed photo-reconnaissance version used in Korea, 36 built.
XF9F-3
Prototype for the F9F-3, one built.
F9F-3
Allison J33 powered version produced as insurance against the failure of the J42, with all converted to the J42 later; redesignated F-9B in 1962, 54 built.
XF9F-4
Prototypes used in the development of the F9F-4, two built.
F9F-4
Version with longer fuselage with greater fuel load and powered by J33 engine. Most re-engined with Pratt & Whitney J48s. F9F-4s were the first aircraft to successfully employ pressurized bleed air, tapped from the engine's compressor stages, and blown across the surface of the slot flaps, simulating a higher airspeed across the control surface, and thus achieving a decrease in stalling speed of 9 kn (17 km/h) for takeoff and 7 kn (13 km/h) on power approach for landing; re-designated F-9C in 1962, 109 ordered, all completed as F9F-5s.
F9F-5
Variant of F9F-4, but powered by Pratt & Whitney J48 engine, 616 built. Re-designated F-9D in 1962.
F9F-5P
Unarmed photo-reconnaissance version, with longer nose; redesignated RF-9D in 1962, 36 built.
F9F-5K
After the F9F Panther was withdrawn from operational service, a number of F9F-5s were converted into unmanned target drone aircraft; redesignated QF-9D in 1962.
F9F-5KD
Radio controlled drone director conversions for F9F-5K drones; redesignated DF-9E in 1962.

== Operators ==
Argentina

- Argentine Navy - Argentine Naval Aviation

United States

- United States Navy
- United States Marine Corps

== Surviving aircraft ==
=== Argentina ===
On display

F9F-2B

- 0421/3-A-106 (Argentine Navy) - Gate guardian at Puerto Belgrano Naval Base (Base Naval Puerto Belgrano - BNPB) at Bahía Blanca, Argentina.
- 0425/3-A-113 (Argentine Navy) - Being restored at Argentine Naval Aviation Museum (es:Museo de la Aviación Naval Argentina - MUAN) at Bahía Blanca, Argentina.
- 0452/3-A-111 (Argentine Navy) - Gate guardian at Punta Indio Naval Air Base (Base Aeronaval Punta Indio - BAPI) near La Plata, Argentina.
- 0453/3-A-118 (Argentine Navy) - Displayed at National Naval Museum (es:Museo Naval de la Nación) at Tigre, Argentina.

=== United States ===
Airworthy

F9F-2B

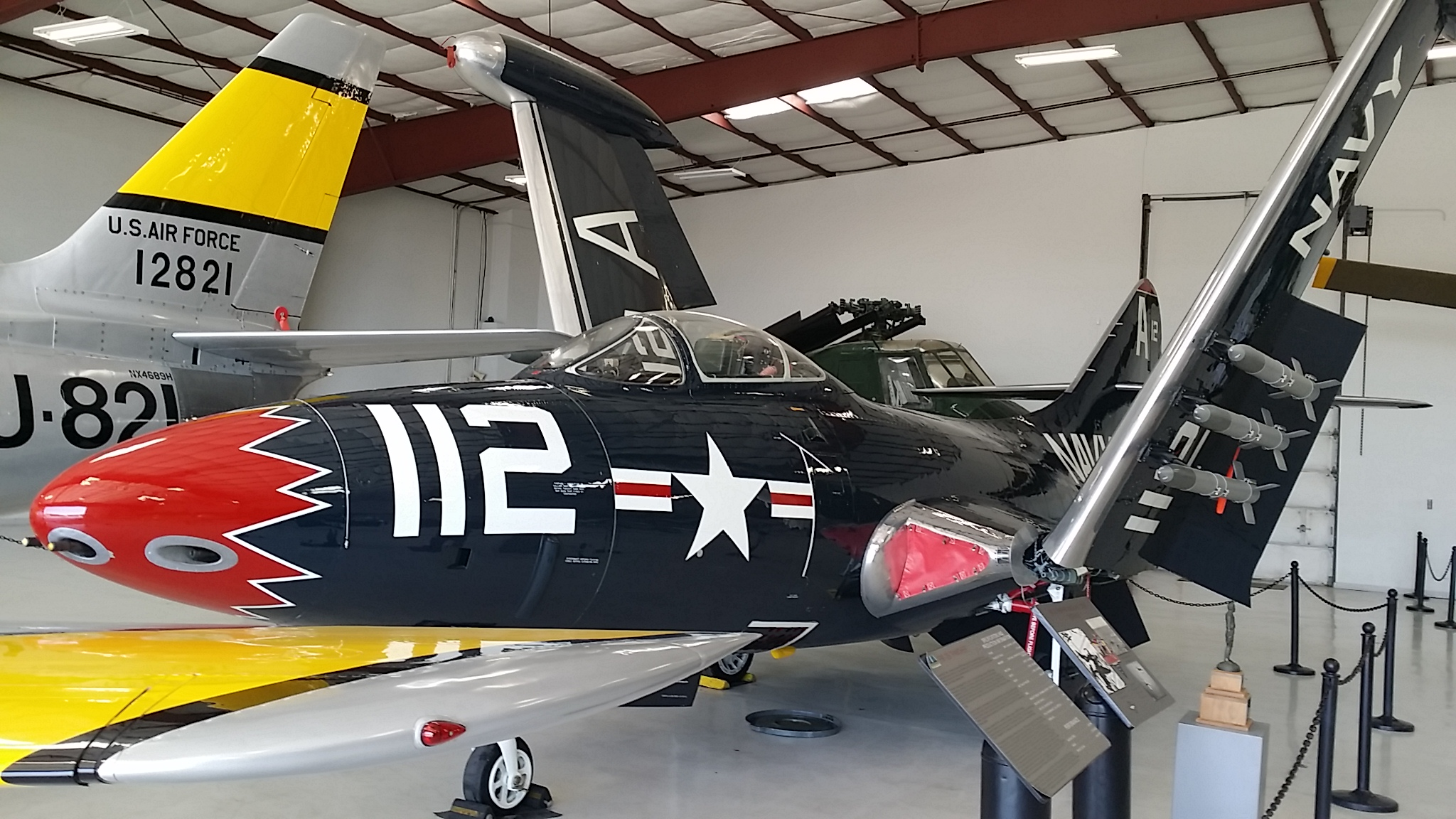
F9F-2B at the Cavanaugh Flight Museum

- 123078 - Cavanaugh Flight Museum in Addison, Texas. Removed from public display when the museum indefinitely closed on 1 January 2024. To be transported to North Texas Regional Airport in Denison, Texas.

On display

F9F-2

- 123050 - National Naval Aviation Museum at Naval Air Station Pensacola, Florida.
- 123557 - VFW Post 1621 in Janesville, Wisconsin.
- 123612 - NAS Oceana Air Park, Naval Air Station Oceana, Virginia.
- 123652 - Flying Leatherneck Aviation Museum, Marine Corps Air Station Miramar, California.
- 125183 - Pima Air & Space Museum, adjacent to Davis-Monthan AFB in Tucson, Arizona.
- 127120 - Wings of Freedom Aviation Museum at the former NAS JRB Willow Grove in Horsham, Pennsylvania.

F9F-2B

- 123526 - National Museum of the Marine Corps, adjacent to Marine Corps Base Quantico in Triangle, Virginia.

F9F-4

- 125180 - Lion's Park in Costa Mesa, California.

F9F-5

- bureau number unknown (incorrectly marked as 141136) - USS Midway Museum in San Diego, California
- 125295 - Valiant Air Command Warbird Museum at Space Coast Regional Airport in Titusville, Florida.
- 125992 - Aviation Heritage Park in Bowling Green, KY.
- 126226 - Combat Air Museum adjacent to Forbes Air National Guard Base at Topeka Regional Airport / Forbes Field (former Forbes AFB) in Topeka, Kansas.
- 126275 - Battleship Memorial Park in Mobile, Alabama.

F9F-5P

- 125316 - Palm Springs Air Museum, Palm Springs, California.
- 126277 - Planes of Fame Air Museum, Chino, California.

Under restoration or in storage

F9F-2

- 123054 - under restoration at Yanks Air Museum in Chino, California.
- 123092 - in storage for restoration at USS John F. Kennedy Museum in North Kingston, Rhode Island.
- 123420 - in storage at Fantasy of Flight in Polk City, Florida.

F9F-5

- 125467 - in storage by private owner in Bulverde, Texas.

== Specifications (F9F-5 Panther) ==
F9F-5 line drawing

Data from United States Navy Aircraft since 1911

General characteristics

- Crew: 1
- Length: 38 ft 10 in (11.84 m)
- Wingspan: 38 ft 0 in (11.58 m)
- Height: 12 ft 3 in (3.73 m)
- Wing area: 250 sq ft (23 m^{2})
- Empty weight: 10,147 lb (4,603 kg)
- Gross weight: 18,721 lb (8,492 kg)
- Powerplant: 1 × Pratt & Whitney J48-P-6A turbojet, 6,250 lbf (27.8 kN) thrust

Performance

- Maximum speed: 503 kn (579 mph, 932 km/h) at 5,000 ft (1,500 m)
- Cruise speed: 418 kn (481 mph, 774 km/h)
- Range: 1,100 nmi (1,300 mi, 2,100 km)
- Service ceiling: 42,800 ft (13,000 m)
- Rate of climb: 5,090 ft/min (25.9 m/s)

Armament

- Guns: 4 × 20 mm (0.79 in) AN/M3 cannon, 760 rounds total
- Hardpoints: 8 with a capacity of 3,465 lb (1,572 kg)

Avionics

- AN/APN-1 – Radar altimeter

== Notable appearances in media ==
The F9F Panther was featured in the 1954 Korean War film The Bridges at Toko-Ri starring William Holden, Grace Kelly, Mickey Rooney and Fredric March, and in Men of the Fighting Lady starring Van Johnson, Walter Pidgeon and Keenan Wynn.

Stock footage of an F9F piloted by George Chamberlain Duncan crashing into the fantail of the USS Midway (CV-41) during a 1951 test flight appears in several Hollywood films.

- In 1954's Men of the Fighting Lady, the crash is portrayed as the death of Lieutenant Commander Ted Dodson (played by Keenan Wynn).
- In the 1976 film Midway, the F9F footage stands in for an SB2C Helldiver crash-landing.
- In the 1990 film The Hunt for Red October, the F9F footage is used to depict the crash-landing of an F-14A Tomcat that had collided with a Soviet aircraft onto the USS Enterprise (CVN-65), reenacting an incident from Tom Clancy's original novel.

== See also ==
Related development

- Grumman F-9 Cougar
- Grumman XF10F Jaguar

Aircraft of comparable role, configuration, and era

- Hawker Sea Hawk
- McDonnell F2H Banshee

Related lists

- List of fighter aircraft
- List of military aircraft of the United States
- List of United States Navy aircraft designations (pre-1962)
