= Rolls-Royce Nene =

1940s British turbojet aircraft engine

RB.41 Nene / J42
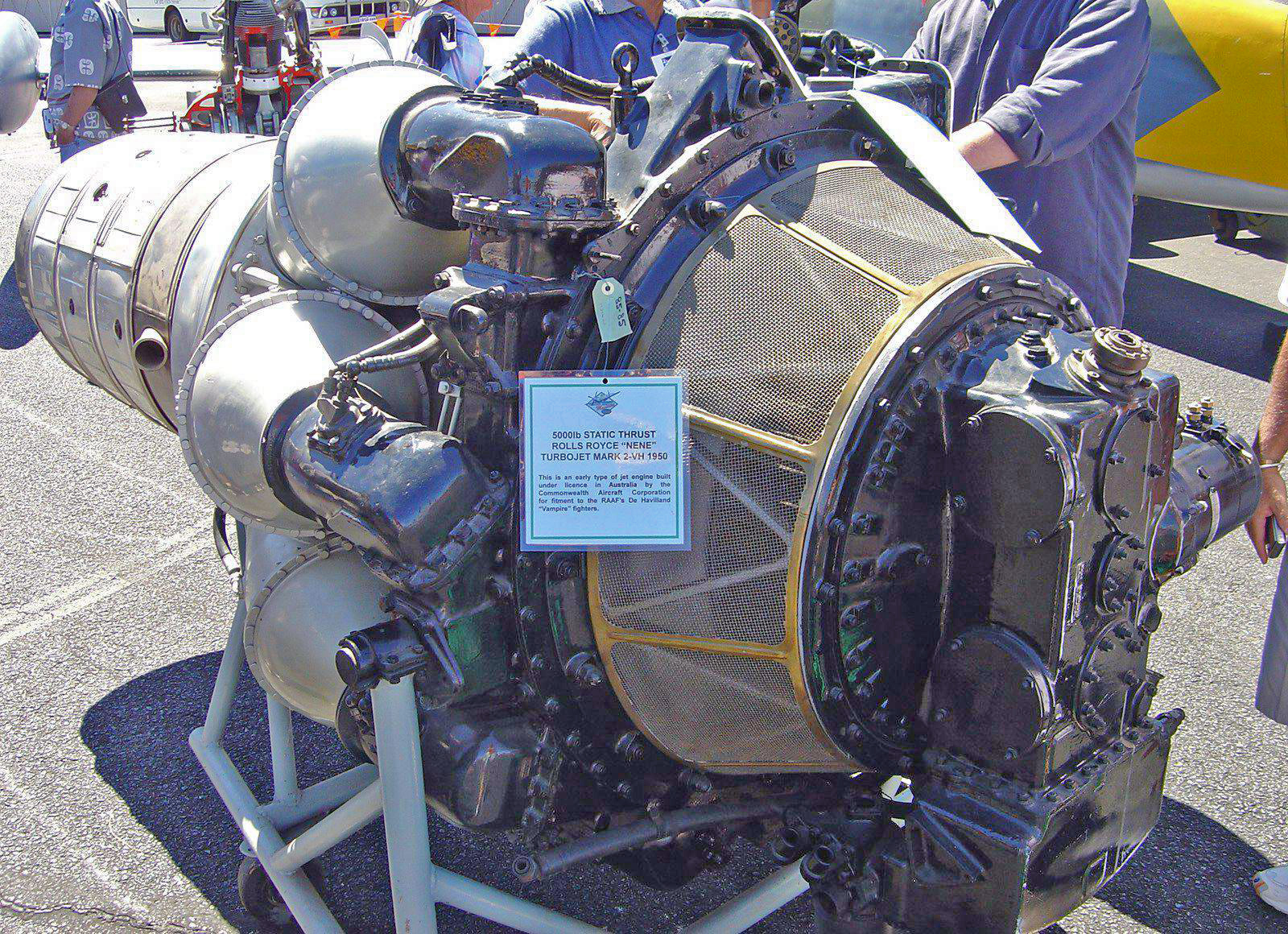
- Rolls-Royce Nene on display at RAAF Base Pearce, Western Australia, with wire mesh grille around the air intake to prevent foreign object damage
- Type: Turbojet
- Manufacturer: Rolls-Royce Limited
- First run: 27 October 1944
- Major applications: Canadair CT-133 Silver Star; Dassault Ouragan; de Havilland Vampire; Grumman F9F Panther; Hawker Sea Hawk
- Number built: 1,139 (J42)
- Developed from: Rolls-Royce Derwent
- Developed into: Rolls-Royce Derwent V; Rolls-Royce RB.44 Tay; Pratt & Whitney J48; Klimov VK-1

The Rolls-Royce RB.41 Nene is a 1940s British centrifugal compressor turbojet engine. The Nene was a complete redesign, rather than a scaled-up Rolls-Royce Derwent, with a design target of 5,000 lbf (22 kN), making it the most powerful engine of its era. First run in 1944, it was Rolls-Royce's third jet engine to enter production, and first ran less than 6 months from the start of design. It was named after the River Nene in keeping with the company's tradition of naming its jet engines after rivers.

The design saw relatively little use in British aircraft designs, being passed over in favour of the axial flow Avon that followed it. Its only widespread use in the UK was in the Hawker Sea Hawk and the Supermarine Attacker. In the US it was built under licence as the Pratt & Whitney J42, and it powered the Grumman F9F Panther. Its most widespread use was in the form of the Klimov VK-1, a reverse-engineered, modified and enlarged version which produced around 6,000 lbf (27 kN) of thrust, and powered the Russian built Mikoyan-Gurevich MiG-15, a highly successful fighter aircraft which was produced in vast numbers.

An uprated version of the Nene was produced as the Rolls-Royce Tay.

== Design and development ==
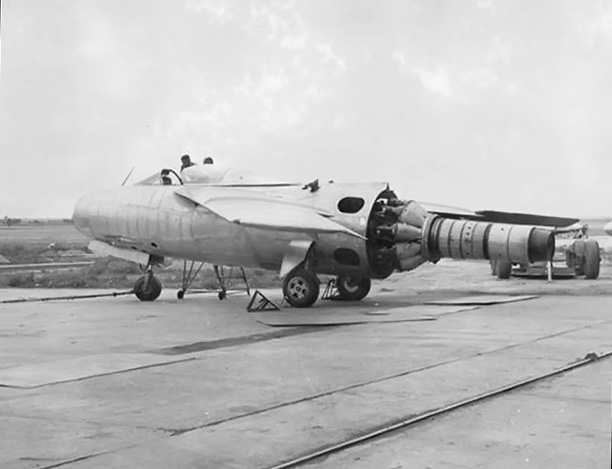
An FMA IAe 33 Pulqui II without tail section, showing its Rolls-Royce Nene II turbojet

The Nene was designed as a result of a June 1944 visit to the US by Stanley Hooker. He discovered that General Electric already had two engine types running, an axial and a centrifugal, of 4,000 lbf (18 kN) thrust. He was determined to produce a higher thrust engine and subsequently obtained a Ministry of Aircraft Production contract for an engine of 4,200 lbf (19 kN) thrust with the understanding that 5,000 lbf (22 kN) would be the design target. Hooker, Adrian Lombard, Pearson and Morley designed a new engine, the B.41 later called the Nene, rather than scaling up the Derwent.

The double-sided impeller was 28.8 inches (73 cm) in diameter, compared to 20.68 in (52.5 cm) for the Derwent I, to produce an airflow of 80 lb/s (36 kg/s), while the overall diameter of the engine was 49.5 inches (126 cm). A scaled up Derwent of the same thrust would have had a 60-inch (150 cm) diameter. The compressor casing was based on Whittle's Type 16 W.2/500 compressor case which was more aerodynamically efficient than that on the Derwent but also eliminated cracking. Other design advances included nine new low pressure-drop/high efficiency combustion chambers developed by Lucas and a small impeller for rear bearing and turbine disc cooling. The first engine start was attempted on 27 October 1944. A number of snags delayed the run until nearly midnight, when with almost the entire day and night shift staff watching, an attempt was made to start the engine. To the frustration of everyone with a vested interest in it starting the engine refused to light - positioning the igniter was a trial-and-error affair at the time. On a subsequent attempt, Denis Drew, who had come from Lucas, the combustion specialists, and took a wide interest in engine development problems, removed one of the igniters and instead used the flame from an oxy-acetylene torch to ignite the fuel in the combustion chamber.

The igniter had to be close enough to the fuel spray to ignite it when starting, but not overheat when subjected to the continuous flame temperature when the engine was running. The larger diameter of the Nene combustion chambers found this to be a problem, and the first-run needed to ignite with a flame rather than the spark energy that was considered sufficient at that time. The Nene was subsequently fitted with two torch, or flame, igniters which had a fuel spray next to an igniter. The flame would project into the main combustor fuel spray. Torch igniters were superseded by surface discharge igniter plugs with a considerably greater energy release rate than a flame.

The engine was run up to just over 4,000 lbf (18 kN), and a cheer went up around the assembled personnel. However the engine was running hotter than expected and would not reach 5,000 lb, as it was built, without overheating the turbine. Pearson, the performance engineer, insisted that no more running be done without fitting the guide vanes that were available for the impeller intake. Upon Hooker's arrival next morning, and informed that the inlet vanes had been fitted during the night, Hooker was overjoyed to see the thrust gauge needle registering 5,000 lbf (22 kN) at the same temperature that had only given 4,000 lb the previous night, making the B.41 the highest thrust jet engine in the world. Weight was around 1,600 lb (730 kg).

Inlet guide vanes had been in use in Whittle engines for some time. They improve the overall performance of the engine significantly by "helping the air round the corner". However they were made from thin sheet metal and often broke damaging the engine. For Hooker they were a worrying mechanical problem which he did not want so they were not fitted when the Derwent entered service, although the turbine had to run 90 degC hotter to give the take-off thrust of 2,000 lb. He was still concerned with the durability of the vanes so the first Nene was initially built without them.

The Nene was based on the "straight-through" version of the basic Whittle-style layout, with the flow going directly through the engine from front to rear, as opposed to a "reverse-flow" type, which reverses the direction of air flow through the combustor section so that the turbine stage can be mounted within the combustor section; this allows for a more compact engine, but increases the combustor pressure losses which has an adverse effect on engine performance. Less thrust is generated with the same fuel flow. It was during the design of the Nene that Rolls decided to give their engines numbers as well as names, with the Welland and Derwent keeping their original Rover models, B/23 and B/26. It was later decided that these model designations looked too much like RAF bomber designations (i.e. "English Electric Canberra B.Mk 2" would often be shortened to "Canberra B.2"), and "R" was added to the front, the "R" signifying "Rolls" and the original Rover "B" signifying Barnoldswick. This RB designation scheme continued into the late 20th Century, with turbofan designs such as the RB.199, RB.203 and RB.211; the most recent family of Rolls-Royce turbofans (a development of the RB.211) goes under the simple designation "Rolls-Royce Trent", with variants given their own designator number or letter series (i.e. Trent 500, Trent 900, Trent 1000, Trent XWB, etc.).

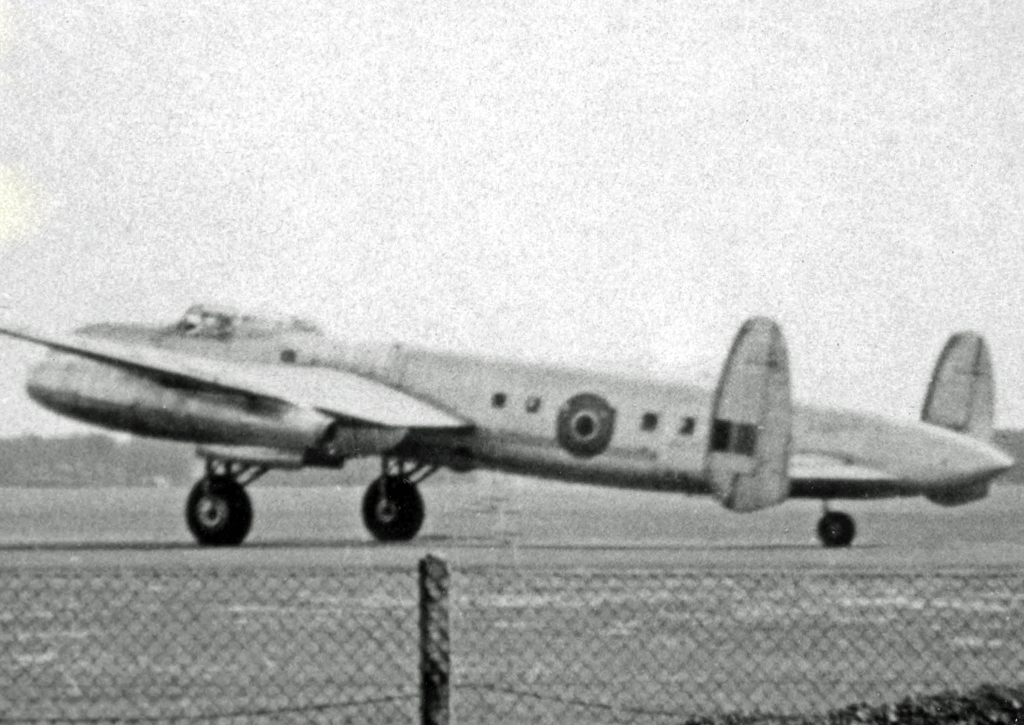
The Rolls-Royce Avro Lancastrian Nene test bed, in 1948, fitted with the jet engines in the outboard positions

Early airborne tests of the Nene were undertaken in an Avro Lancastrian operated by Rolls-Royce from their Hucknall airfield. The two outboard Rolls-Royce Merlins were replaced by the jet engine. The Nene's first flight however was in a modified Lockheed XP-80 Shooting Star.

After seeing the Nene running, at an after work drink at the Swan & Royal Hotel, Clitheroe, and hearing the complaints about a lack of any official application for the engine, someone - thought to be Whittle - suggested that the Nene be scaled-down to fit a Meteor nacelle. J.P. Herriot or Lombard did the calculation on a tablecloth and announced a thrust of 3,650 lbf (16.2 kN). At this time they were attempting to increase the Derwent's thrust from 2,200 to 2,450 lbf (9.8 to 10.9 kN), and the idea seemed "too good to be true". On hearing this, Hooker did a quick calculation and announced, "We've got a 600-mph [970 km/h] Meteor".

Drawings for the 0.855 scale Nene, now known as the Derwent V, were started on 1 January 1945 and on 7 June the engine began a 100-hour test at 2,600 lbf (12 kN), soon reaching 3,500 lbf (16 kN). Weight was 1,250 lb (570 kg). By 1946 thrust had been increased to 4,200 lbf (19 kN) using Nimonic 90 turbine blades.

The development of the Nene was continued with this scaled-down version, the Derwent V having no direct relationship to the earlier Derwent series. On 7 November 1945, the first official air speed record by a jet aircraft was set by a Meteor F.3 of 606 miles per hour (975 km/h) powered by the scaled-down Nene.

== Service use ==
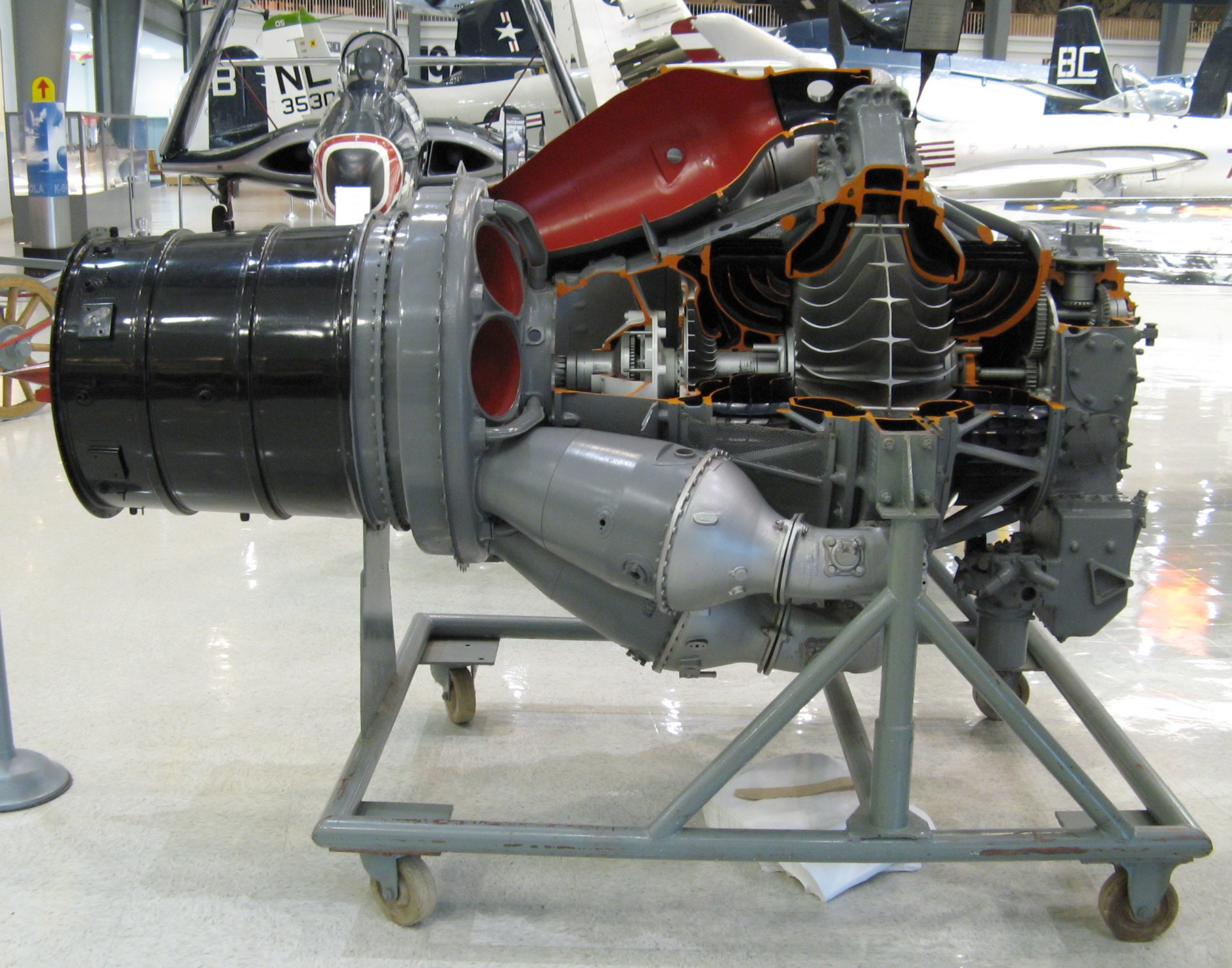
Pratt & Whitney J42

The Nene doubled the thrust of the earlier generation engines, with early versions providing about 5,000 lbf (22.2 kN), but remained generally similar in most ways. This should have suggested that it would be widely used in various designs, but the Gloster Meteor proved so successful with its Derwents that the Air Ministry felt there was no pressing need to improve upon it. Instead a series of much more capable designs using the Rolls-Royce Avon were studied, and the Nene generally languished.

A total of twenty-five Nenes were sold to the Soviet Union as a gesture of goodwill - with reservation to not use for military purposes - with the agreement of Stafford Cripps. Rolls-Royce were given permission in September 1946 to sell 10 Nene engines to the USSR, and in March 1947 to sell a further 15. The price was fixed under a commercial contract. A total of 55 jet engines were sold to the Soviets in 1947. Seventeen Soviet engineers trained at the Rolls-Royce factory in Derby in 1947 to maintain and repair the engine. The Soviets reneged on the promise to not use it for military purposes, and reverse engineered the Nene to develop the Klimov RD-45, and a larger version, the Klimov VK-1, which soon appeared in various Soviet fighters including Mikoyan-Gurevich MiG-15.

Pratt & Whitney acquired a licence to produce the Nene as the Pratt & Whitney J42, and it powered the Grumman F9F Panther which first flew in November 1947.

The Nene was used to power the first civil jet aircraft, the Nene Viking, a modified Vickers Viking, the single example of which first flew on 6 April 1948 from Wisley Airfield.

It was briefly made under licence in Australia for use in the de Havilland Vampire fighters operated by the RAAF. It was also built by Orenda in Canada for use in 656 Canadair CT-133 Silver Star aircraft from 1952.

Hispano-Suiza in France built the Nene under licence as the Hispano-Suiza Nene, with a limited production run before concentrating on the larger Rolls-Royce Tay/Hispano-Suiza Verdon.

== Variants ==
RN.1
RN.2
RN.6
Nene I
Nene Mk.3
With an electric starter motor and two torch igniters the Mk.3 powered the Supermarine Attacker F Mk.1.
Nene Mk.10
Similar to the Mk.102 but with a larger accessories wheelcase for the Lockheed T-33.
Nene Mk.101
With a bifurcated jet-pipe for the Hawker Sea Hawk, at a reduced output of 5,000 lbf (22.24 kN)
Nene Mk.102
Similar to the Mk.3, but incorporating more modern equipment, for the Supermarine Attacker FB Mk.2
Nene Mk.103
Uprated to 5,200 lbf (23.13 kN) for the Hawker Sea Hawk FB.5 and FGA.6. Some were retrofitted to convert existing FB.3 and FGA.4 aircraft.
Pratt & Whitney J42
US licence production

J42-P-4
J42-P-6
J42-P-8
Turbo-Wasp JT-6B

Klimov RD-45/VK-1

Unlicensed copy produced in the USSR.
H.S. Nene 102
H.S. Nene 104
H.S. Nene 104-BR
H.S. Nene 105A
H.S. Nene 105-AR

== Applications ==
Nene

- Armstrong Whitworth AW.52
- Avro Ashton
- Avro Lancastrian (test-bed)
- Avro Tudor VIII
- Boulton Paul P.111
- Boulton Paul P.120
- Breguet Br 972 (jet powered proposal)
- Canadair CT-133 Silver Star
- Dassault Ouragan
- de Havilland Vampire
- Fiat G.82
- FMA IAe 33 Pulqui II
- FMA I.Ae 38 (jet powered proposal)
- Gloster E.1/44
- Handley Page HP.88
- Hawker P.1052
- Hawker P.1081
- Hawker Sea Hawk
- Nord 2200
- Rolls-Royce Thrust Measuring Rig
- SNCAC NC.1071
- SNCAC NC 1080
- SNCASO SO.4000
- SNCASO SO.6000 Triton
- Sud-Est Grognard
- Sud-Ouest Bretagne
- Sud-Ouest Triton
- Supermarine Attacker
- Vickers Type 618 Nene-Viking

Pratt & Whitney J42

- Grumman F9F Panther

Klimov RD-45

- Mikoyan-Gurevich MiG-15

== Engines on display ==
- A complete Nene engine is displayed at the RAF Manston History Museum, Manston, Kent.
- A complete Nene engine is displayed at the South Yorkshire Aircraft Museum, Doncaster, England.
- A sectioned Rolls-Royce Nene is on display at the Fleet Air Arm Museum, RNAS Yeovilton.
- A sectioned Rolla-Royce Nene-10 is on display at Canadian Warplane Heritage Museum, Hamilton, Ontario, Canada.
- Gatwick Aviation Museum Charlwood surrey
- A cutaway Nene II on display at the New England Air Museum
- A sectioned Hispano-Suiza Nene is on display at the Ailes Anciennes Toulouse Museum in France.
- Ailes Anciennes Toulouse Museum Toulouse/Blagnac.
- A sectioned RR Nene is on display at the Queensland Air Museum, Caloundra, Australia.
- A complete Nene engine is on display at the Historical Aircraft Restoration Society, at Albion Park, New South Wales, Australia
- A Nene, from a Pulqui II, is on display at the National Aeronautics Museum, Moron, Buenos Aires, Argentina.
- A Nene is on display at the Rolls-Royce Heritage Trust Collection (Derby).
- An H-S Nene plated "106/104C" is on public display at the City of Norwich Aviation Museum in Horsham St Faith, Norfolk.

== Specifications (Nene) ==
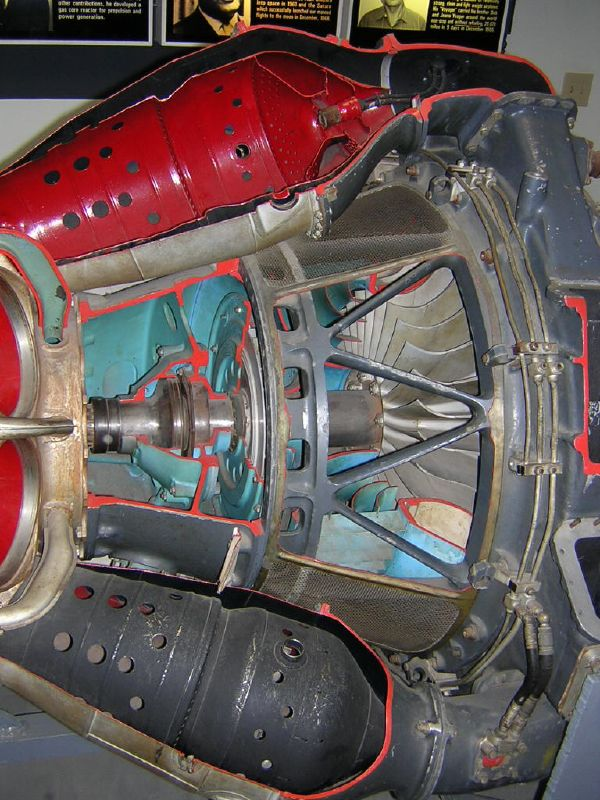
Cutaway view showing the combustion chambers and compressor

Data from

==== General characteristics ====
- Type: centrifugal compressor turbojet
- Length: 96.8 in (2,459 mm)
- Diameter: 49.5 in (1,257 mm)
- Dry weight: 1,600 lb (726 kg)

==== Components ====
- Compressor: single-stage centrifugal with double-sided impeller
- Combustors: 9 x can combustion chambers
- Turbine: single-stage axial
- Fuel type: kerosene
- Oil system: pressure feed, dry sump with scavenge, cooling and filtration

==== Performance ====
- Maximum thrust: (also Take off rating) at sea level static 5,000 lbf (22.2 kN) at 12,300 rpm
- Max Cruise rating: at sea level static 4,360 lbf (19.4 kN) at 12,000 rpm
- Cruise rating: at sea level static 3,620 lbf (16.1 kN) at 11,500 rpm
- Idle: at sea level static 120 lbf (0.5 kN) at 2,500 rpm
- Specific fuel consumption: 1.06 lb/(lbf⋅h) (30 g/(kN⋅s))
- Thrust-to-weight ratio: 3.226

== See also ==
Related development

- Rolls-Royce RB.44 Tay
- Pratt & Whitney J48
- Klimov VK-1

Related lists

- List of aircraft engines

== Bibliography ==
- Bridgman, L, (ed.) (1998) Jane's fighting aircraft of World War II. Crescent. ISBN 0-517-67964-7
- Buttler, Tony (July–August 2001). "Turbojets for Stalin: Some Facts Behind the Sale of British Jet Engines to Russia". Air Enthusiast. No. 94. pp. 73–77. ISSN 0143-5450.
- Connors, Jack (2010). The Engines of Pratt & Whitney: A Technical History. Reston. Virginia: American Institute of Aeronautics and Astronautics. ISBN 978-1-60086-711-8.
- Kay, Anthony L. (2007). Turbojet History and Development 1930-1960. Vol. 1 (1st ed.). Ramsbury: The Crowood Press. ISBN 978-1-86126-912-6.
- Wilkinson, Paul H. (1946). Aircraft Engines of the world 1946. London: Sir Isaac Pitman & Sons. pp. 298–299.
