= Boulton Paul P.111 =

Tailless delta experimental aircraft, United Kingdom, 1950

P.111
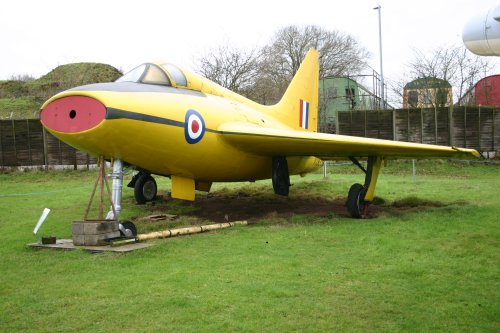
- VT 935, the P.111A on display at the Midland Air Museum

General information
- Type: Experimental aircraft
- Manufacturer: Boulton Paul
- Designer: Dr S.C. Redshaw
- Primary user: Royal Aircraft Establishment
- Number built: 1

History
- First flight: 10 October 1950
- Retired: June 1958
- Variant: Boulton Paul P.120

The Boulton Paul P.111 is an experimental aircraft designed and produced by the British aircraft manufacturer Boulton Paul. It was amongst the first aircraft designed to explore the characteristics of the tailless delta wing configuration.

The development of the P.111 came as a response to the release of Specification E.27/46 by the Air Ministry shortly after the conclusion of the Second World War. To internally accommodate its Rolls-Royce Nene turbojet propulsion, a relatively broad fuselage was necessitated, giving it an unorthodox appearance. The wing featured removable wing tips that could be swapped to produce different wing shapes, a feature deemed to be highly desirable for the aerodynamic investigations it was built to perform. Other novel features beyond the wing included a Martin-Baker-built ejection seat and an early fully powered flight control system. The P.111 performed its maiden flight on 10 October 1950.

Early flight testing of the aircraft revealed the flight controls to be highly sensitive, major trim shifts would also occur whenever the landing gear was deployed or retracted, and a relatively high landing speed was also necessary. Various modifications, including the addition of fuselage-mounted airbrakes, a rudimentary feedback arrangement for the flight controls, and redesigned undercarriage doors, were made during the flight test programme, the majority of these changes occurred following a minor landing accident. These modifications were so extensive that the aircraft was re-designated as the P.111A. Its final test flight occurred during 1958, after which the aircraft itself was transported to the Cranfield College of Aeronautics for use as a training airframe. The type should not be confused with the later Boulton Paul P.120, albeit the two aircraft do share considerable similarities.

== Design and development ==
Throughout the late 1940s and early 1950s, the Allied Powers sought to maximise the capabilities of their militaries and industries by investigating and harnessing the wartime advances made in Nazi Germany during the Second World War. In particular, these nations were keen to explore and integrate numerous aerospace advances and theories acquired through activities akin to Operation Paperclip. In Britain, the Air Ministry issued Specification E.27/46, which called for an experimental aircraft to perform an investigation of the then-unfamiliar delta planform wing, particularly in terms of its stability and controllability. The aircraft manufacturer Boulton Paul opted to pursue this specification and tasked its chief designer, Dr S. C. Redshaw, with producing an appropriate aircraft.

The resulting aircraft, designated P.111, was a basic aircraft specifically designed for Delta wing research. In terms of its basic configuration, the P.111 was designed to be the smallest possible airframe that would accommodate both a single Rolls-Royce Nene turbojet engine, a Martin-Baker-built ejection seat and a delta wing. Because of the need to internally house the relatively wide Nene engine, which used a centrifugal compressor, the fuselage of the P.111 had a rather tubby appearance; air was supplied to the engine via a flattened oval nose intake. The inward-retracting landing gear had a noticeably wide track and a tall nosewheel leg placed it at 17° on the ground; sizable doors covered the recesses of the undercarriage while retracted. All-metal construction was used throughout the aircraft, with the exception of the wing extensions and the fin tip, which were of glass-reinforced plastic; the skin of the aircraft was a stressed structural element.

The delta wing of the P.111 was relatively thin in comparison to contemporary wings and was swept at an angle of 45°. When not fitted with tip extensions, this wing was strongly cropped at about 75 percent of the pure delta shape, while the installation of the larger extensions resulted in an almost unbroken pure delta shape. The P.111 could be flown with these wings or with one of two pairs of extensions. The purpose of these tip extensions was to investigate the different aerodynamic effects that their fitting would have upon the delta wing without having to replace or reshape the whole wing to do so. The fin, which had an unswept trailing edge, also featured a removable and adjustable tip, though it is believed that the aircraft was always flown with the particularly pointed tip fitted. The fin accommodated a VHF aerial at its tip as well as a camera installed in its leading edge.

Unlike its contemporary, the Avro 707, control of both the roll and attitude of the P.111 was achieved via a pair of elevons, which were designed to also function as ailerons where appropriate, and could be controlled both electrically and manually. Fuel was accommodated across six flexible fuel tanks, three within each wing. Flight information was continuously recorded by instrumentation installed just aft of the cockpit, parameters captured typically pertained to either the controls or the engine. The P.111 was fitted with one of the first fully powered control systems, which were hydraulically driven and accompanied by electrically actuated trim tabs. Traditional push-pull rods were used for all controls.

== Testing and evaluation ==
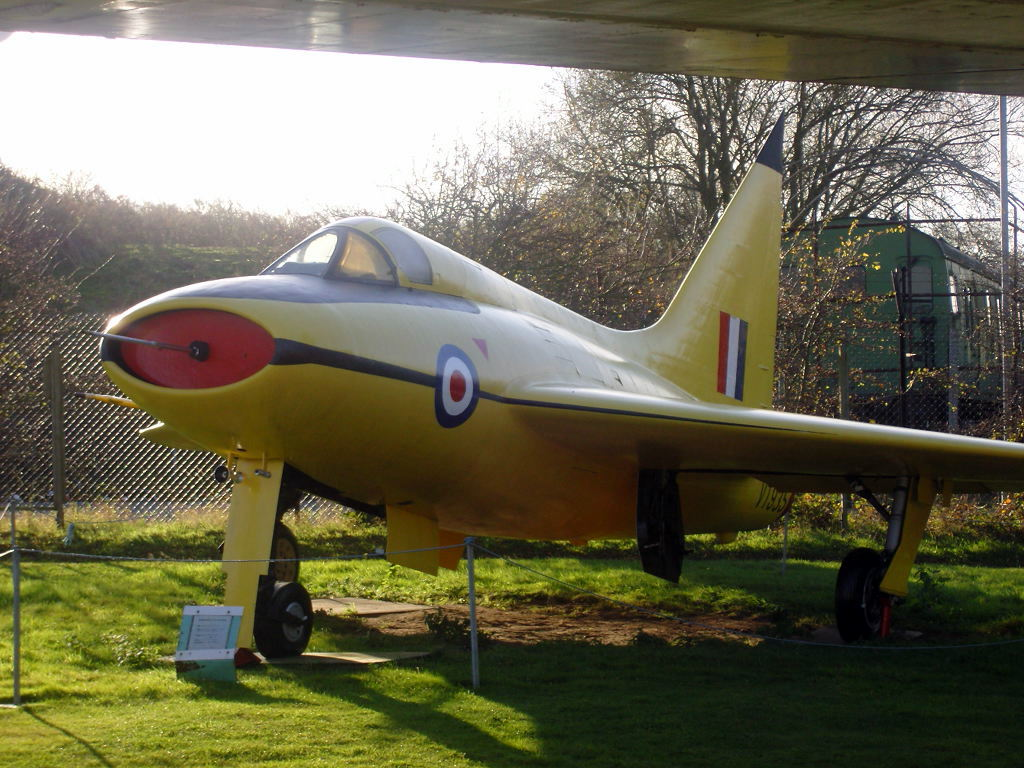
The Boulton Paul 111A on display at the Midland Air Museum

Powered ground testing of the P.111 commenced during early autumn 1950 almost immediately after construction of the sole aircraft had been completed; it took roughly three years to build. While company testing was started at Pendeford Airfield, Staffordshire, its relatively short grass airstrips were deemed unsuitable for anything further than taxiing upon. Accordingly, the aircraft was dismantled and transported by road to RAF Boscombe Down, Wiltshire, where it was reassembled and prepared for its first flight.

On 10 October 1950, the P.111 conducted its maiden flight with Squadron Leader Bob Smyth at the controls. The majority of its test flying career saw the aircraft being flown by test pilot, Alexander E. "Ben" Gunn, who described the aeroplane as "touchy" and "like flying a razor's edge". This touchiness has been partially attributed to the design of the power controls, deemed to be essential for flying at high speeds (in excess of 450 mph), which lacked any feedback. The aircraft also experienced a relatively large trim shift whenever the undercarriage was raised or lowered, while the landing speeds were fairly high due to the absence of airbrakes as well as it being necessary to maintain a high level of engine revs for the onboard generators to function; electricity was essential for operating the powered control surfaces.

Within the P.111's first few months of flying, it was subject to several modifications and improvements. Amongst these, the controls were spring-loaded to give a semblance of feel, while the rudder was converted to a manual control arrangement. The P.111 had been initially fitted a continuously curved single-piece blown windscreen, however, due to issues encountered with this unit, it was replaced mid-way through the test flight programme with a more conventional framed screen windscreen, complete with a flat forward pane.

Following an accident during a landing in which the retractable landing gear failed to extend, the P.111 was not only repaired but also received modifications to improve its flight characteristics. To clearly reflect these changes, it was decided to re-designate the aircraft as the P.111A. The modifications included the addition of four petal-shaped airbrakes upon the fuselage, which reduced the landing speeds considerably, while the undercarriage doors were changed to reduce the trim change incurred. A lengthy nose-mounted probe carrying a pitot head was also added at this time. The most immediately obvious visual change to the aircraft was the new bright yellow overall paint scheme adopted, the P.111 having been either unpainted or silver coloured. Due to this latter feature, the P.111A acquired the nickname of the "Yellow Peril".

On 2 July 1953, the P.111A first flew from RAF Boscombe Down. Shortly afterwards, the anti-spin parachute mounted on the rear port fuselage was strengthened so it could be deployed as a braking parachute, while the pilot was also given control over the strength of the power controls. The aircraft was operated by the Royal Aircraft Establishment (RAE) in a series of explorations of delta wing characteristics, for its later flights, the P.111A was based at RAE Bedford. During this time, it was flown with each of the three wing tips.

The final flight of the P.111A was conducted on 20 June 1958. Shortly after this, the sole aircraft was donated to the Cranfield College of Aeronautics, where it was used as a training airframe. In 1975, it was acquired by the Midland Aircraft Preservation Society via a long-term loan for its Midland Air Museum at Coventry Airport; on 13 July 1975, the P.111A was transported by road to the museum, where it was placed on static public display. The P.111 was followed by another delta-winged experimental aircraft, the P.120 which was intended to compare and contrast the behaviour of an otherwise identical tailed delta.

== Specifications (P.111) ==
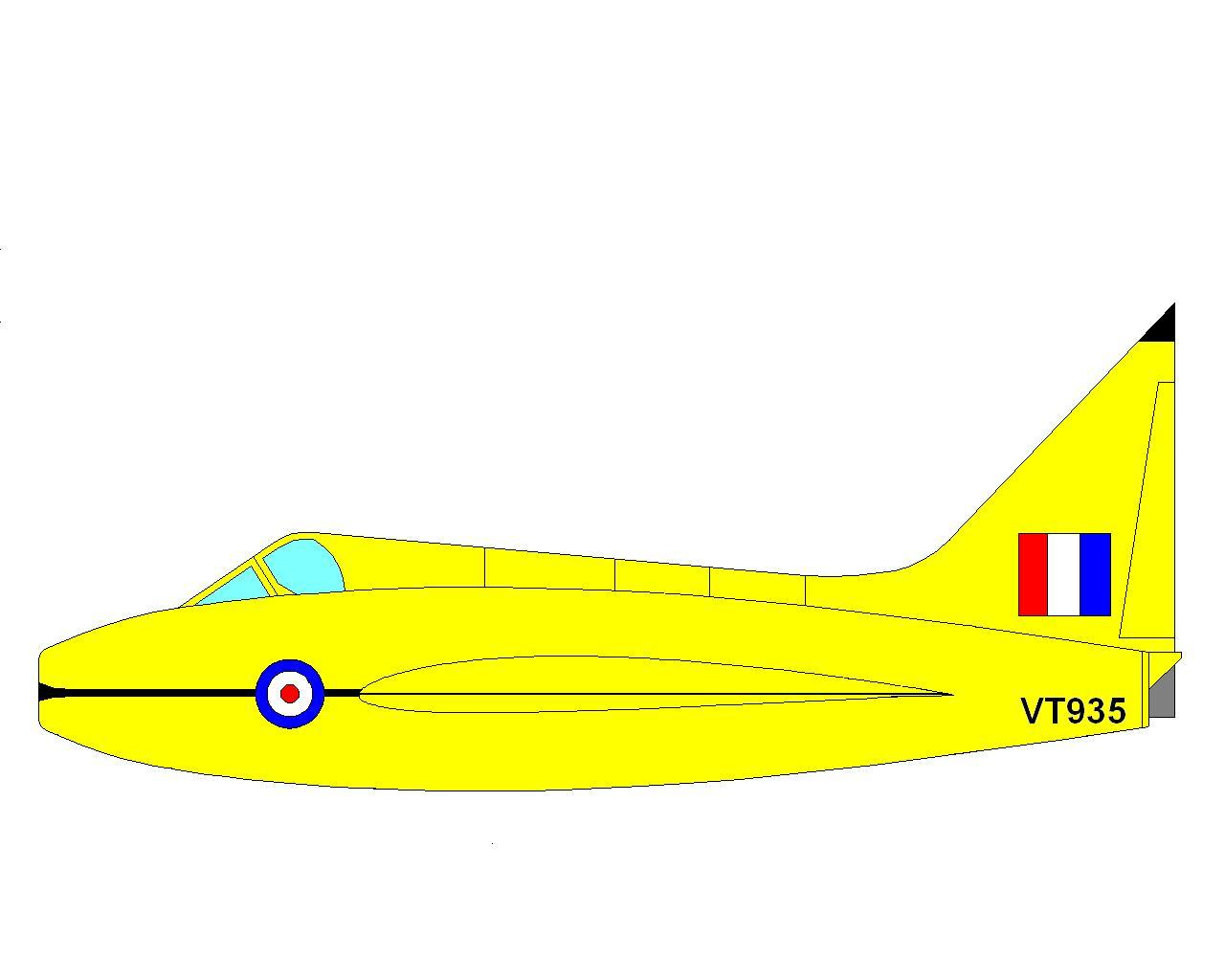
VT 935, Profile of Boulton Paul P111A

Data from Boulton Paul Aircraft since 1915

General characteristics

- Crew: 1
- Length: 26 ft 1 in (7.95 m) (without nose probe)
- Wingspan: 25 ft 8 in (7.82 m) (29 ft 9 in (9.07 m) or 33 ft 6 in (10.21 m) with optional detachable wingtips)
- Height: 12 ft 6 in (3.81 m)
- Wing area: 269.25 sq ft (25.014 m^{2}) (284.16 sq ft (26.399 m^{2}) or 290.13 sq ft (26.954 m^{2}) with detachable wingtips)
- Empty weight: 7,517 lb (3,410 kg)
- Gross weight: 10,127 lb (4,594 kg)
- Powerplant: 1 × Rolls-Royce Nene 3 RN.2 turbojet, 5,100 lbf (23 kN) thrust

Performance

- Maximum speed: 649 mph (1,045 km/h, 564 kn)
- Rate of climb: 9,400 ft/min (48 m/s)

== See also ==
Aircraft of comparable role, configuration, and era

- Avro 707
- Boulton Paul P.120
- Convair XF-92
- Handley Page HP.115

Related lists

- List of experimental aircraft
