= Boulton Paul P.120 =

British research aircraft

P.120
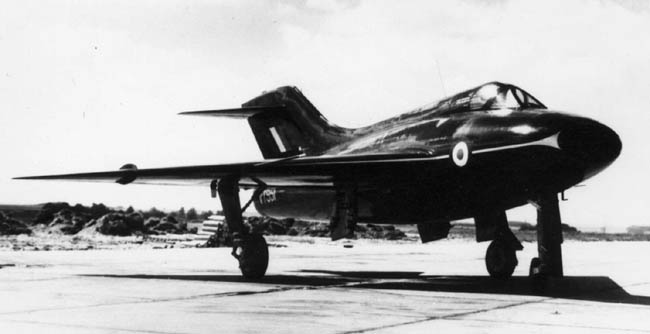
- Boulton Paul P.120 VT 951 in its "black" paint scheme

General information
- Type: Research aircraft
- Manufacturer: Boulton Paul
- Status: Cancelled
- Number built: 1

History
- First flight: 6 August 1952
- Retired: 1952
- Developed from: Boulton Paul P.111

The Boulton Paul P.120 was a research aircraft designed and produced by the British aircraft manufacturer Boulton Paul. It was the last aircraft design by the company to be flown.

The P.120 was developed to investigate the aerodynamic properties of the delta wing configuration. Performing its maiden flight on 6 August 1952, the sole aircraft conducted a series of test flights from RAF Boscombe Down. The P.120 was very similar to the earlier Boulton Paul P.111, a tailless experimental aircraft, but principally differed by having a horizontal tailplane as well as its fixed wingtips. The sole aircraft was lost in a non-fatal incident after encountering severe flutter; the test pilot, "Ben" Gunn, safely evacuated the plane by way of its ejection seat; the first ejection from a delta wing aircraft. While plans were made to rebuild the P.111 into a second P.120, these were not actioned and as a result no further activity with the type occurred.

== Design and development ==
The P.120 was developed in response to the Air Ministry's issuing of Specification E.27/49, which was one element of a larger programme undertaken at the behest of the British government into a recent innovation, the delta wing, that required several experimental aircraft to properly investigate the properties and characteristics involved. Boulton Paul were immediately interested in the specification and noticed that a suitable aircraft could be produced, albeit with some design changes, from the earlier Boulton Paul P.111 experimental aircraft. While the two aircraft shared a high degree of similarities, such as being furnished with a largely identical wing (an unclipped delta configuration) and a similar fuselage, there were both minor and major differences between the two aircraft.

The primary differences between the P.120 and P.111 were present on the tail unit. The new aircraft featured a swept wing fin and rudder, while the horizontal tail surfaces were moved upwards, roughly at the upper two-third area of the fin, as a means of improving both longitudinal and directional stability. For the purpose of recording airflow behaviour, a cine camera was embedded into the tip of the fin, while a drogue parachute was housed within a bullet between the rudder and the jetpipe, the latter being lengthened somewhat from its P.111 counterpart. The horizontal tail surface was swept at an angle of 45-degrees and was not a tailplane in the traditional sense, as pitch control was performed using the elevons instead, yet it was all-moving and adjustable for trim tab purposes.

The wing of the P.120, while highly similar to that of the P.111, it featured noticeable bulges of the outbound landing gear doors, while semi-elliptical wing fences were also added at the junction between the wing and wing tips. Unlike the P.111, the wingtips of the P.120 were not removable or replaceable, instead being permanently fitted; they could be rotated either differentially or together for lateral or longitudinal trim. Electro-hydraulic actuators were used to move the wingtips at the direction of the pilot via a control panel on the port side of the cockpit.

While the fuselage was generally similar to that of the P.111, and virtually identical forward of frame 290.88, the rear fuselage of the P.120 featured considerable revision. It was strengthened considerably via the use of additional formers, which was deemed necessary to properly account for the different tail unit fitted. The end of the rear spar was directly attached to the powered rudder. Further minor changes included the addition of a VHF radio aerial upon the spine of the fuselage, just aft of the cockpit, and a repositioned pitot tube. Both the P.111 and P.120 were powered by the same engine, a Rolls-Royce Nene turbojet, capable of generating up to 5,100lb of thrust.

== Testing and evaluation ==
On 6 August 1952, the P.120 performed its maiden flight with test pilot "Ben" Gunn at the controls. During its first test flight difficulties were encountered due to a misjudging of the tailplane incidence required for takeoff in the available distance. Despite this early difficulty, the P.120 exhibited relatively pleasant flying characteristics over 11 hours of flight time. In comparison to the P.111, the P.120 was observed to be more settled when flown at high speeds Throughout its brief flying career, it was flown from RAF Boscombe Down. In preparation for a planned display at the Farnborough Air Show of September 1952, the previously unpainted P.120 received a gloss black (with yellow trim) finish, it was around this time that the aircraft acquired the nickname "Black Widowmaker".

On 28 August, Gunn encountered severe flutter, which led to the loss of the whole port elevon; he had been unable to recognise this flutter due to the lack of a feedback system in the power controls. After experimenting with the damaged aircraft in the hope of recovering it, Gunn eventually opted to eject, doing so safely despite the aircraft's dramatic nickname; the incident was the first ejection from a delta winged aircraft. While no serious injuries or fatalities were incurred from the incident, the P.120 itself was lost in the ensuing crash. The cause was traced back to the insufficient stiffness of the control tab mechanism, which was considerably weaker than Boulton Paul's test specimens.

Due to the early loss of the sole aircraft, little of the planned test programme involving the P.120 was completed. As some officials were keen to continue testing, plans were mooted for the conversion of the earlier P.111 to the P.120 configuration. However, a decision was made to suspend further development, making the P.120 the last Boulton Paul design to fly.

== Specifications (P.120) ==
Data from Boulton Paul Aircraft since 1915

General characteristics

- Crew: 1
- Length: 29 ft 7 1/2 in (9.030 m)
- Wingspan: 33 ft 5 1/2 in (10.198 m)
- Height: 9 ft 6 1/2 in (2.908 m)
- Wing area: 290.13 sq ft (26.954 m^{2})
- Empty weight: 10,656 lb (4,833 kg)
- Gross weight: 12,580 lb (5,706 kg)
- Powerplant: 1 × Rolls-Royce Nene RN.3 turbojet, 5,100 lbf (23 kN) thrust
