= Aviation Heritage Park =

Aviation Heritage Park and Museum
- Location within Kentucky
- Established: 2005
- Location: Bowling Green, Kentucky
- Coordinates: 36.920°N 86.436°W
- Type: Aviation museum
- Director: Bob Bubnis
- Website: www.aviationheritagepark.com

The Aviation Heritage Park and Museum is an aviation museum located in Bowling Green, Kentucky. The park and museum highlight regional pilots their contributions to United States air and space travel.

== History ==
The idea for an aviation park in Bowling Green arose out of a trip by a group of friends, including retired Air Force pilot, Brigadier General Dan Cherry, to the National Museum of the U.S. Air Force. During the trip, the group learned that a McDonnell Douglas F-4 Phantom II aircraft was on display at a local Veterans of Foreign Wars post in Ohio. In fact, it was the exact F-4D flown by Cherry during the Vietnam War, including his dogfight and subsequent downing of a North Vietnamese MiG-21 in 1972.

The aviation park was established in 2005, when the city of Bowling Green and Warren County, Kentucky agreed to the move the aircraft from Ohio. Aviation Heritage Park was dedicated in 2009, with Cherry meeting the Mig-21 pilot he shot down. The park acquired more aircraft over the following years, including an F9F, F-111F, T-38, UH-1, J-3, and SH-3H.

Aviation Heritage Park announced plans for an 11,000 sq ft (1,000 m^{2}) museum building in October 2017 and broke ground one year later. The new museum building opened to the public on 23 September 2023.

== Exhibits ==
Exhibits at the museum include a display about the River Rats.

== Collection ==
- Bell UH-1 Iroquois
- General Dynamics F-111 Aardvark
- Grumman F9F Panther
- Lockheed T-33
- McDonnell F-4D Phantom II
- Northrop T-38 Talon
- Piper J-3 Cub
- Sikorsky SH-3H Sea King

== Events ==
The museum holds an annual Hangar Party fundraiser.

Each year, the museum holds Open Cockpit Day where visitors can see inside the open cockpits of the aircraft on display.

== See also ==
- List of aviation museums
