= North American YF-93 =

Prototype fighter aircraft

YF-93
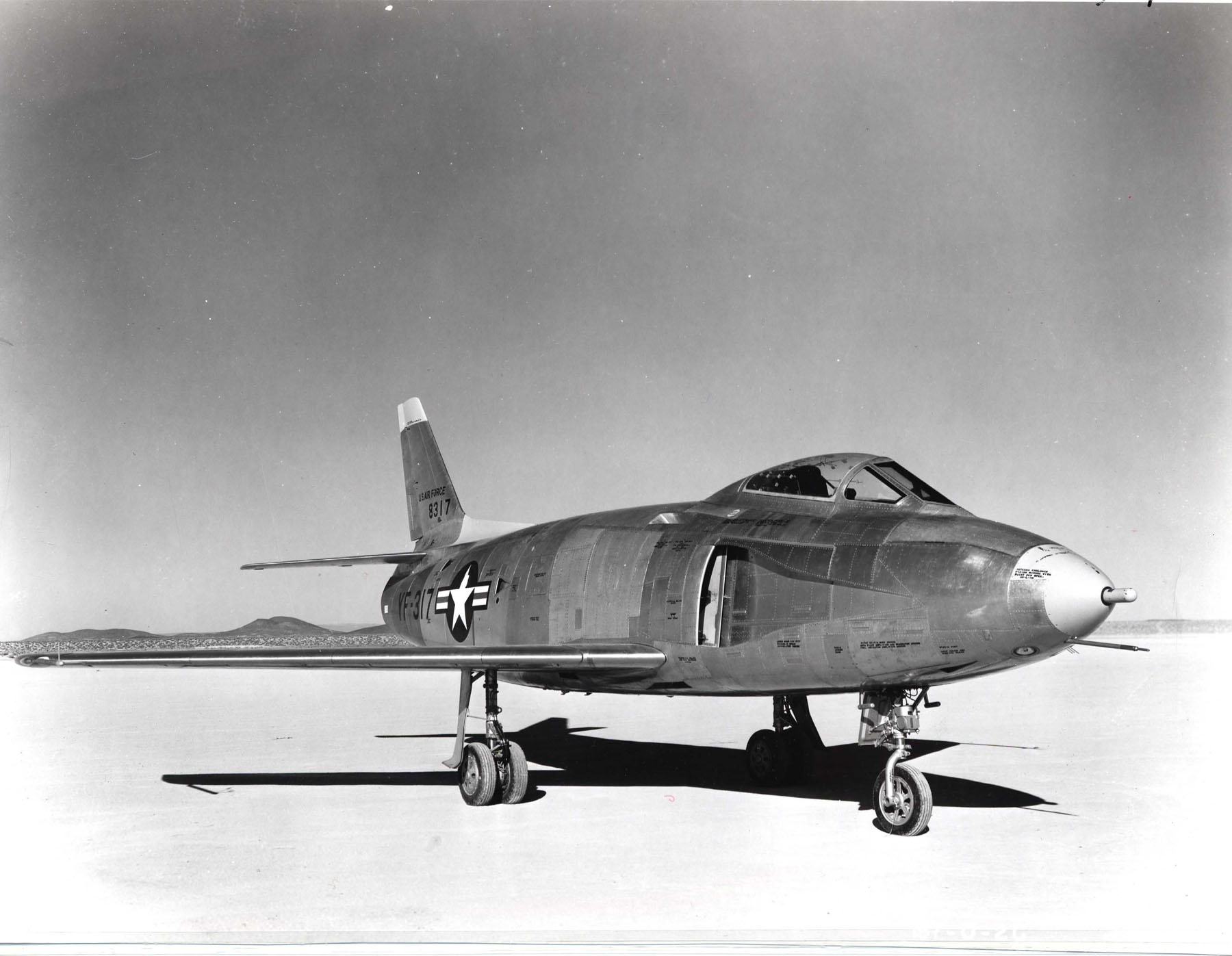
- The first YF-93A with NACA inlets

General information
- Type: Fighter
- Manufacturer: North American Aviation
- Primary users: United States Air Force NACA
- Number built: 2

History
- First flight: 24 January 1950
- Retired: 1956
- Developed from: F-86 Sabre

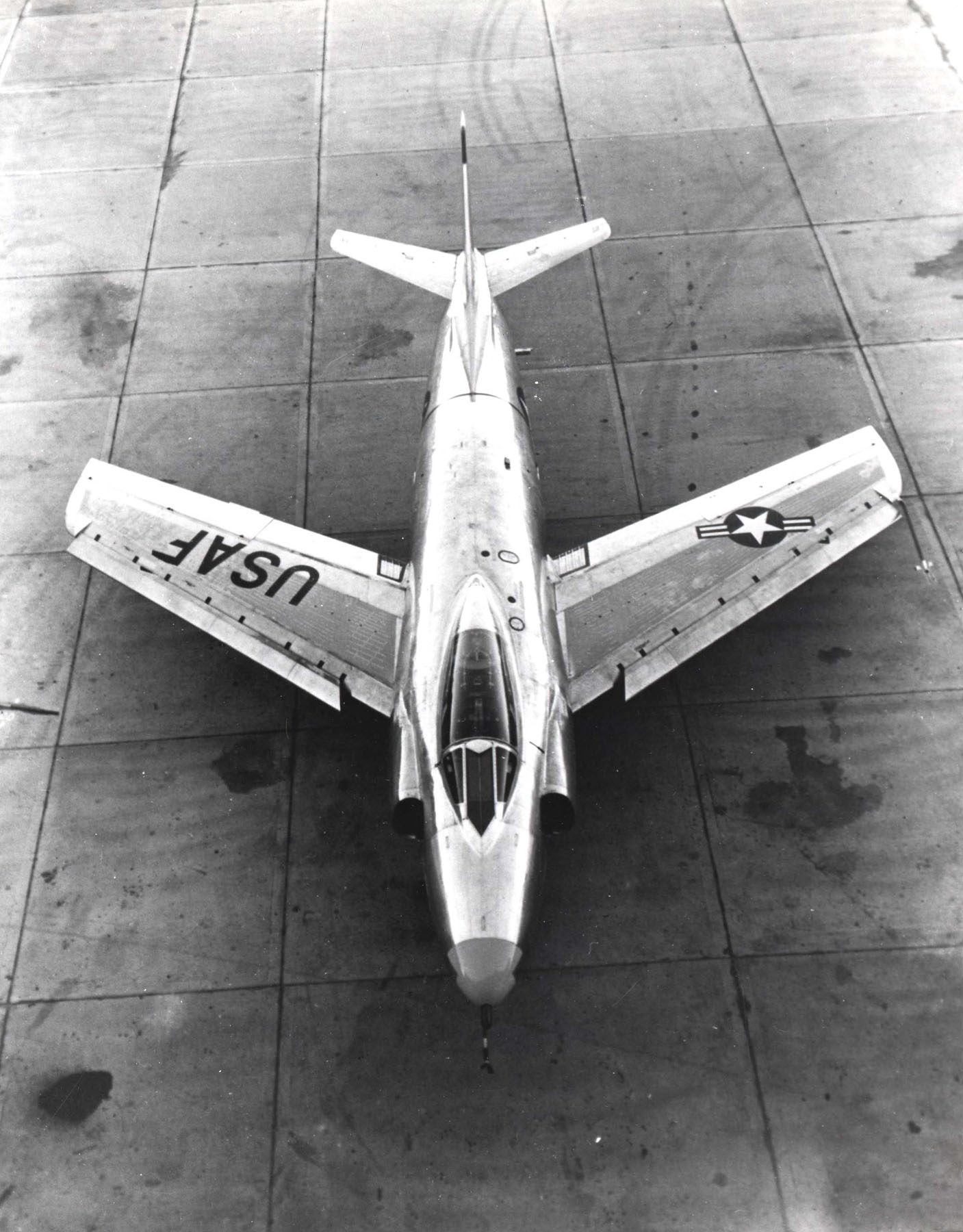
Top view of 48-317, the first YF-93A, after having conventional intakes fitted

The North American YF-93 was an American fighter development of the F-86 Sabre that emerged as a radically different variant that received its own designation. Two were built and flown before the project was eventually canceled.

== Design and development ==
In 1947, North American Aviation began a design study, NA-157, to create a true "penetration fighter" to meet the requirements of a long-range version of its F-86A Sabre. In order to accommodate more fuel, a much larger F-86A was envisioned, eventually able to carry 1,961 US gallons (7,420 L), both internally and with two 200-US-gallon (760 L) underwing drop tanks. The new variant possessed a theoretical unrefuelled range of over 2,000 nmi (2,300 mi; 3,700 km), twice that of the standard production F-86A. The resultant fighter originally designated the F-86C was intended to compete with the XF-88 Voodoo and Lockheed XF-90 to fulfill the USAF's Penetration Fighter requirement for a bomber escort.

The F-86C was much larger and heavier, weighing in at 10,640 lb (4,830 kg) more than its antecedent. The increased weight and girth necessitated a dual-wheel main landing gear, increased wing area and a more powerful engine, the Pratt & Whitney J48 rated at 6,250 lbf (27.8 kN) static thrust and 8,750 lbf (38.9 kN) thrust available in afterburner. With the SCR-720 search radar and six 20 mm (.79 in) cannon mounted in the nose where the air intake was on the F-86A, the engineers designed a novel set of flush-mounted NACA inlets.

In December 1947, the Air Force ordered two prototype NA-157s and, considering the many changes to the F-86, redesignated it YF-93A. Both prototypes were built with NACA inlet ducts; the first, (48-317), was later retro-fitted with more conventional intakes. Six months later, the initial contract was followed up with an order for 118 F-93A-NAs. In 1949, the production order was abruptly canceled as priorities had shifted dramatically following the testing of the ground-breaking Boeing B-47 which reputedly would not need an escort due to its high speed capabilities. With the prototype YF-93As just coming off the production line, the USAF took over the project.

== Operational history ==
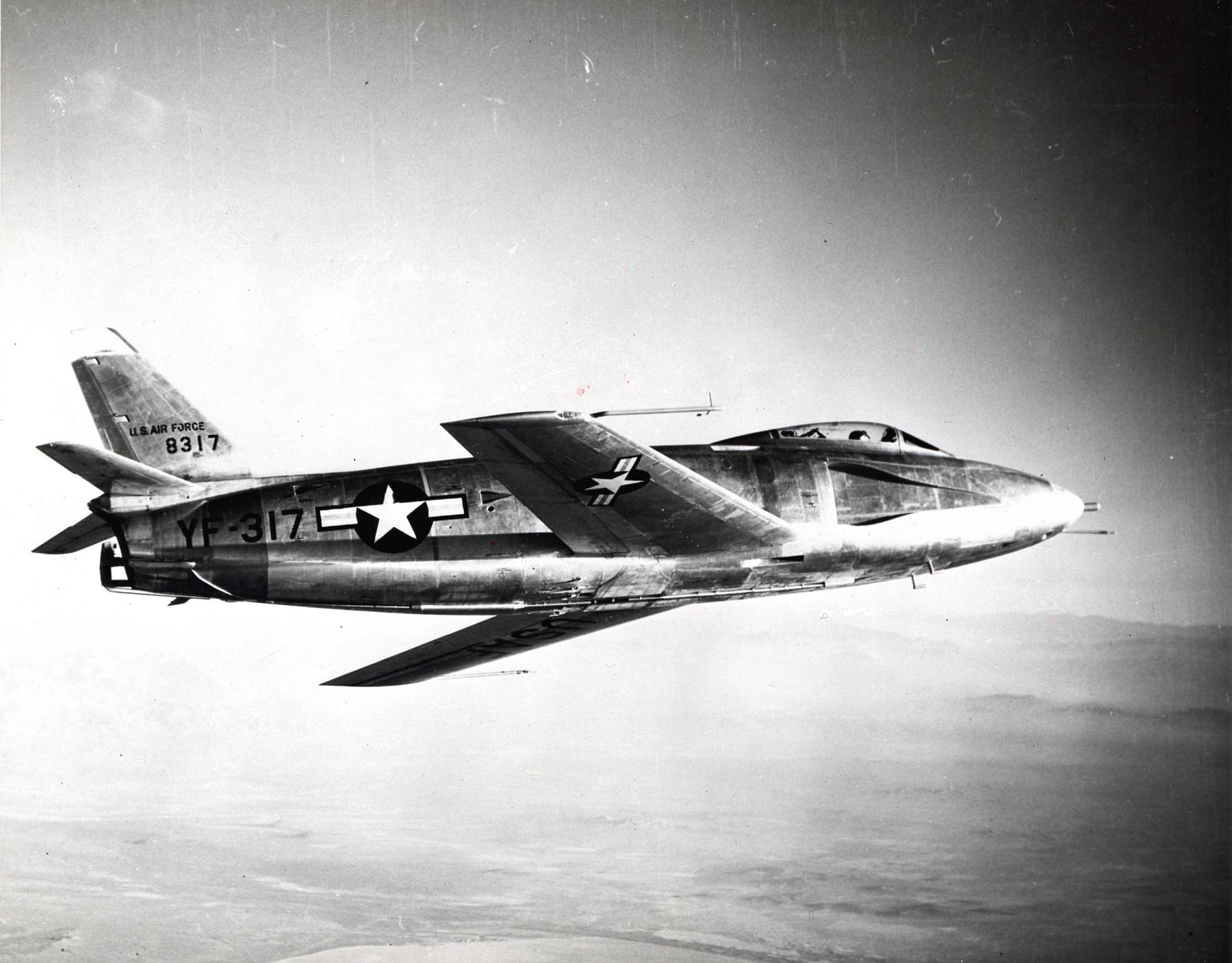
The first YF-93 in flight

The prototypes, serial numbers 48-317 and -318, began flight tests in 1950 and were entered in a flyoff against the other penetration fighter projects, the XF-88 and XF-90; the XF-88 Voodoo was declared the winner. None of the projects would be ordered. The YF-93As were turned over to the National Advisory Committee for Aeronautics (NACA) AMES facility for further testing before being utilized as chase aircraft until 1956. Flight with the NACA ducts proved troublesome at high angles of attack, restricting air flow to the engines. By this time, however, higher performance aircraft were available and both aircraft were eventually declared surplus and scrapped.

== Operators ==
United States

- United States Air Force

== Variants ==
F-86C
Original designation for a re-engined variant of the F-86A, two built.
YF-93A
Two prototype F-86Cs redesignated,
F-93A
Production variant, order for 118 cancelled.

== Specifications (YF-93A) ==
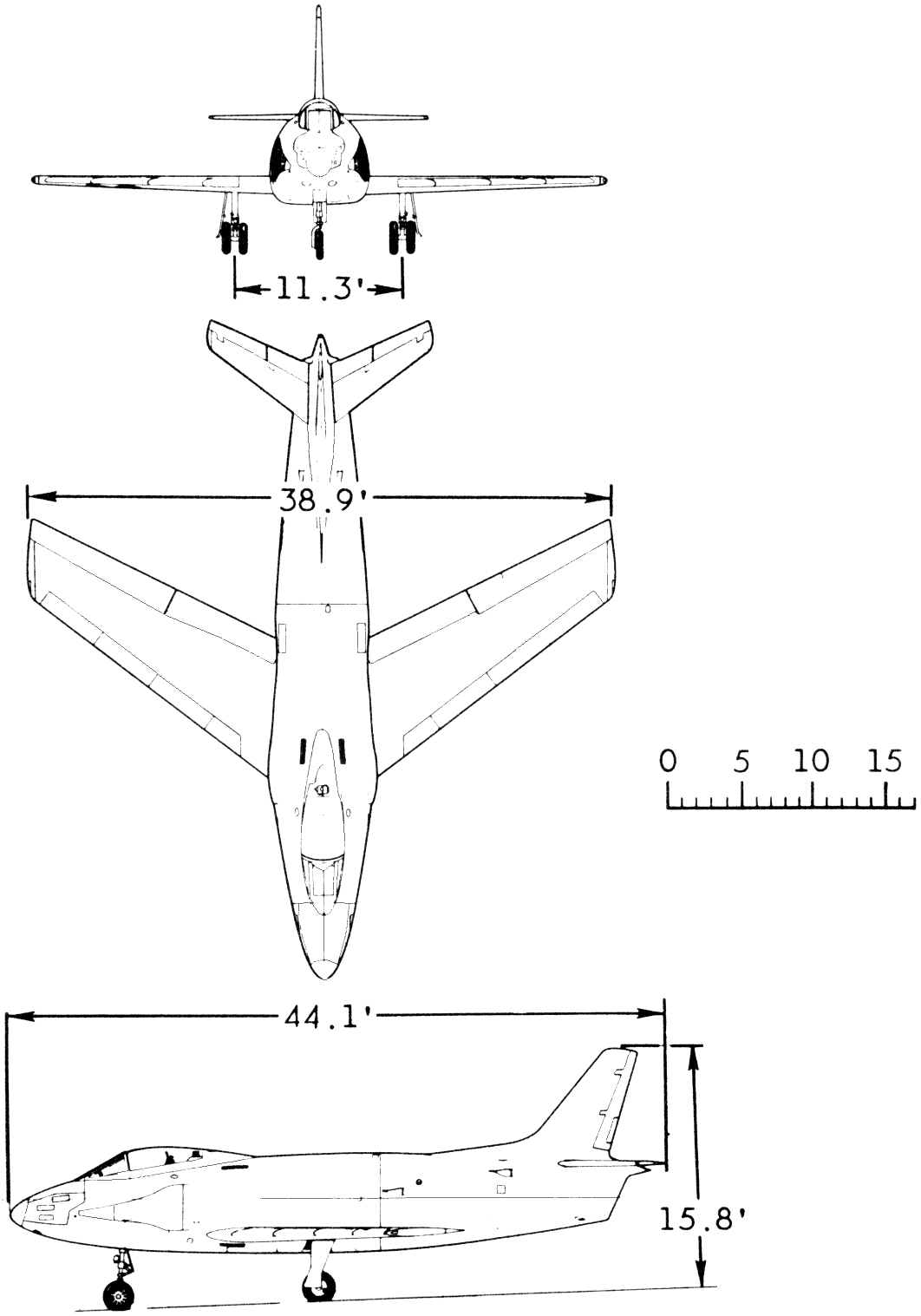
3-view line drawing of the North American YF-93A

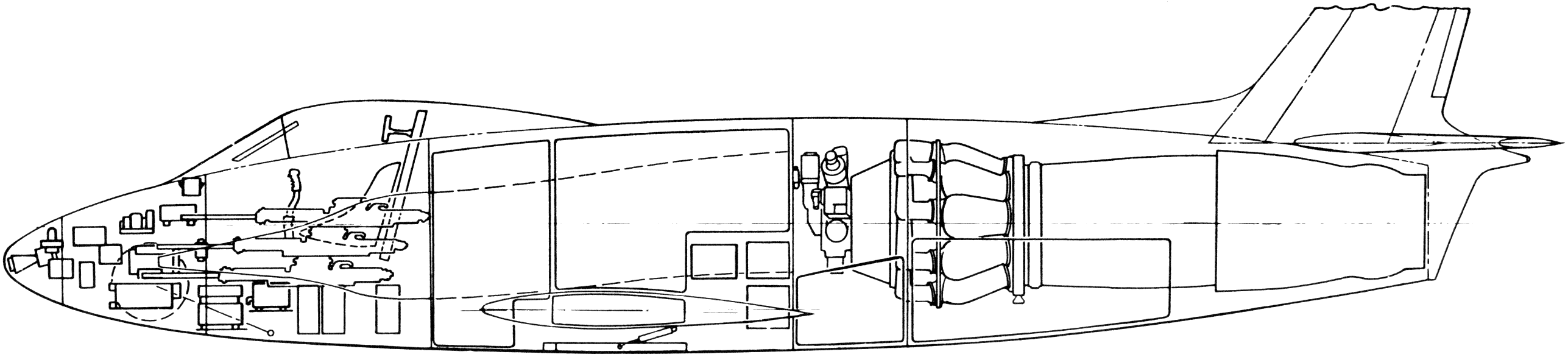
cross section drawing of the North American YF-93A

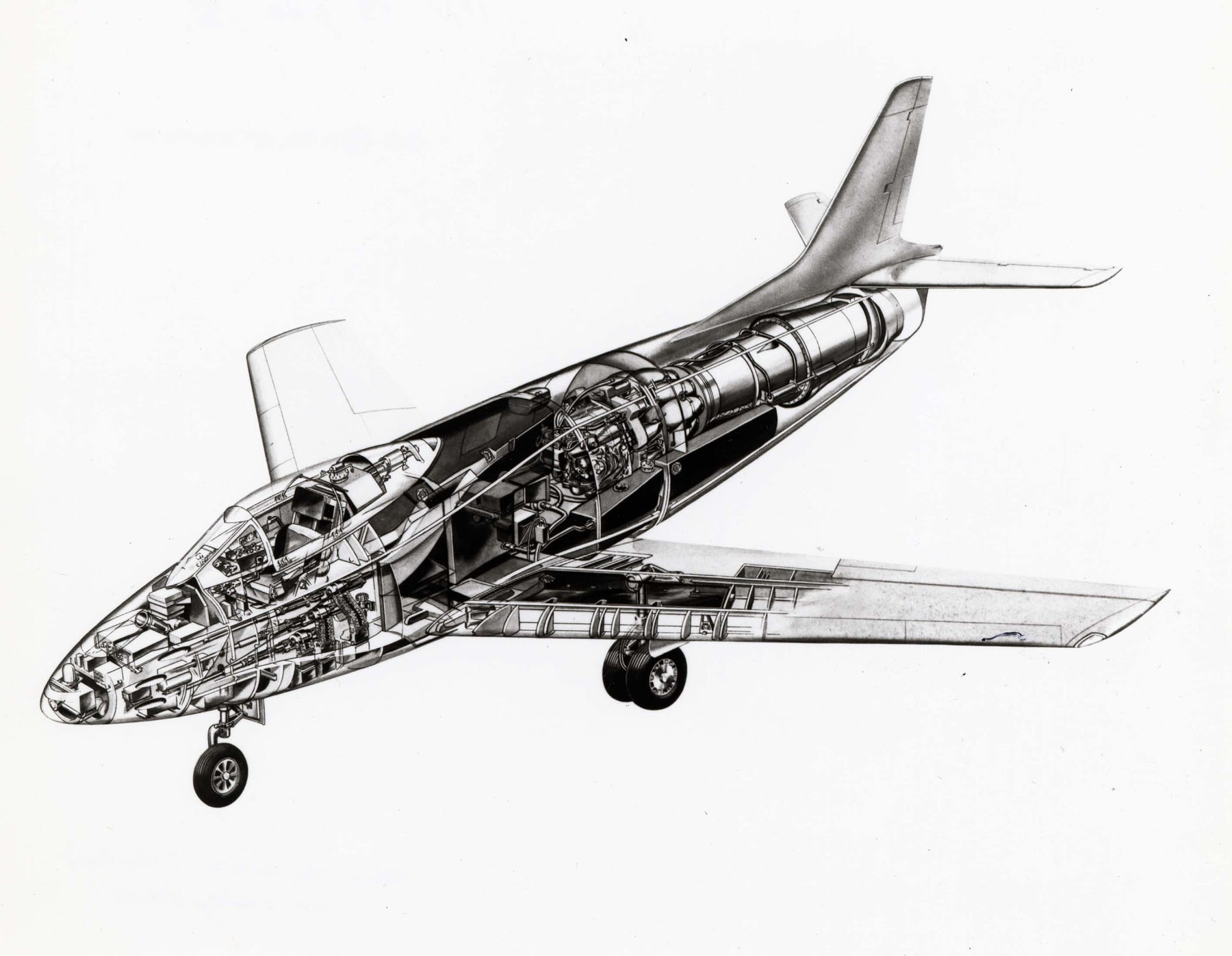
Cut-away illustration of the YF-93A.

Data from The American Fighter

General characteristics

- Crew: 1
- Length: 44 ft 1 in (13.44 m)
- Wingspan: 38 ft 9 in (11.81 m)
- Height: 15 ft 8 in (4.78 m)
- Wing area: 306 sq ft (28.4 m^{2})
- Empty weight: 14,035 lb (6,366 kg)
- Gross weight: 21,610 lb (9,802 kg)
- Max takeoff weight: 26,516 lb (12,027 kg)
- Powerplant: 1 × Pratt & Whitney J48-P-6 turbojet, 6,000 lbf (27 kN) thrust dry, 8,750 lbf (38.9 kN) with afterburner

Performance

- Maximum speed: 708 mph (1,139 km/h, 615 kn) at sea level, 622 mph (1,001 km/h; 541 kn) at 35,000 ft (11,000 m)
- Cruise speed: 534 mph (859 km/h, 464 kn)
- Range: 1,967 mi (3,166 km, 1,709 nmi)
- Service ceiling: 46,800 ft (14,300 m)
- Rate of climb: 11,960 ft/min (60.8 m/s)

Armament

- Guns: 6× 20mm M24 cannon (proposed, not fitted to the prototypes)

== See also ==
Related development

- North American F-86 Sabre
