= Rolls-Royce RB.44 Tay =

1940s British turbojet aircraft engine

Tay/Verdon
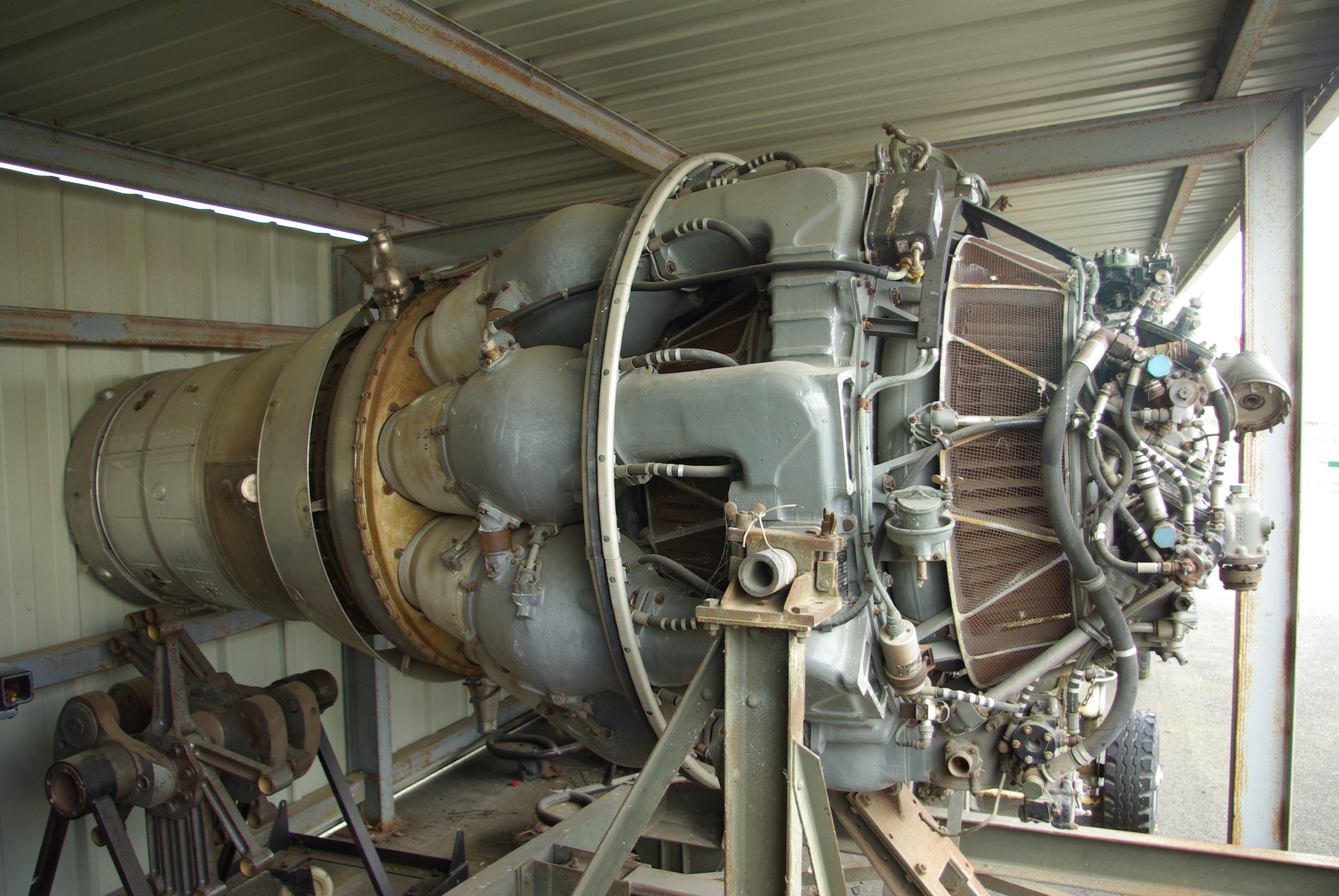
- A Hispano-Suiza Verdon which powered the Dassault Mystere IV, displayed at the Ailes Anciennes Toulouse.
- Type: Turbojet
- Manufacturer: Rolls-Royce Limited
- Major applications: Dassault Mystère IV
- Developed from: Rolls-Royce Nene
- Variants: Pratt & Whitney J48

The Rolls-Royce RB.44 Tay is a British turbojet engine of the 1940s, an enlarged version of the Rolls-Royce Nene designed at the request of Pratt & Whitney. It saw no use by British production aircraft but the design was licence built by Pratt & Whitney as the J48, and by Hispano-Suiza as the Verdon.

Two early production examples of the Tay were evaluated during 1950 by the Royal Aircraft Establishment (RAE) at Farnborough Airfield, Hampshire, in a specially modified Vickers Viscount.

== Variants ==
RB.44 Tay
Rolls-Royce development engines only, no production.
Hispano-Suiza Tay 250
The Tay built under licence in France.
Hispano-Suiza Tay 250A
The Tay built under licence in France.
Hispano-Suiza Tay 250R
The Tay built under licence in France.
Hispano-Suiza Verdon 350
The Tay developed under licence in France.
Hispano-Suiza Verdon 370
The Tay developed under licence in France.
Pratt & Whitney J48
The Tay built and developed under licence in the United States.

== Applications ==
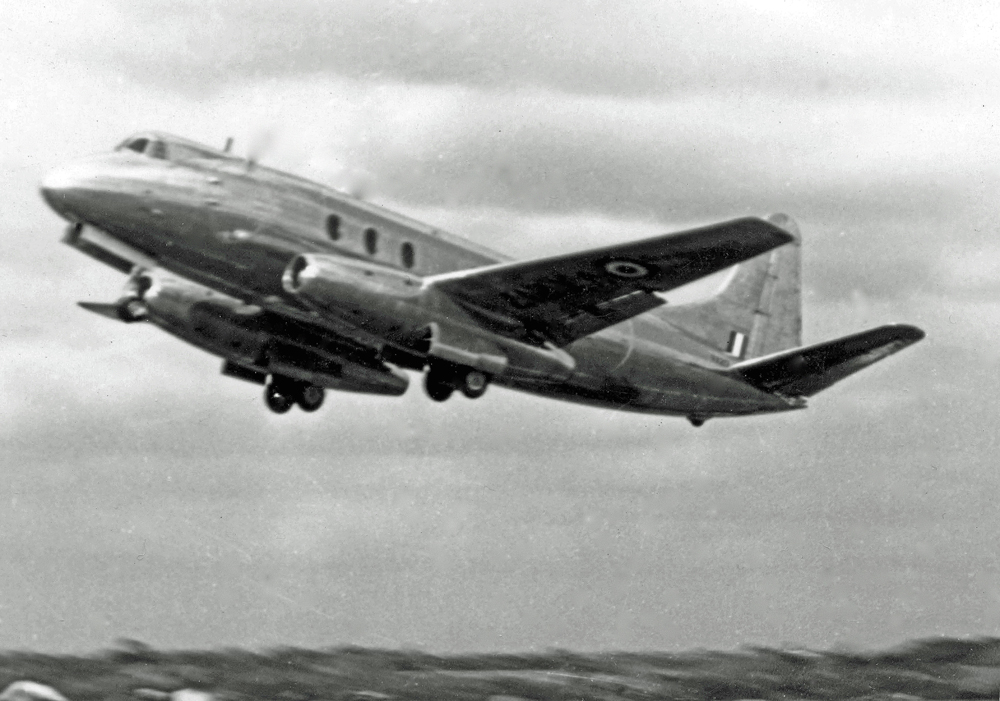
Two early Tay engines under test in 1950 by the RAE in a Vickers Viscount

Tay

- Vickers 663 Tay Viscount

Verdon

- Dassault Mystère IV

== Specifications (Hispano-Suiza Verdon 350) ==
Data from Flight.

==== General characteristics ====
- Type: Turbojet
- Length: 103.2 in (2,621 mm)
- Diameter: 50 in (1,270 mm)
- Dry weight: 2,061 lb (935 kg)

==== Components ====
- Compressor: Double sided centrifugal compressor
- Combustors: Nine tubular combustion chambers
- Turbine: Single-stage turbine
- Fuel type: AVTUR / JET-A1 / F-34 etc.
- Oil system: Pressure spray lubricated with scavenging

==== Performance ====
- Maximum thrust: 7,710 lbf (34 kN) at 11,000 rpm
- Overall pressure ratio: 4.9
- Air mass flow: 132 lb/s (60 kg/s)
- Specific fuel consumption: 1.1 lb/(lbf h)
- Thrust-to-weight ratio: 3.74

== See also ==
Related development

- Rolls-Royce Nene/Pratt & Whitney J42
- Pratt & Whitney J48

Related lists

- List of aircraft engines
