= SIPA S.1100 =

General information
- Type: Army observation and support aircraft
- National origin: France
- Manufacturer: SIPA (Société Industrielle Pour l’Aéronautique)
- Designer: Yves Gardan
- Number built: 1

History
- First flight: 24 April 1958

The SIPA S.1100 was a French twin engine observation and ground support aircraft flown in 1958. The first prototype was destroyed in a fatal crash only a few weeks after its first flight and no more were constructed.

== Design and development ==
In 1958 France was in the middle of the Algerian War and felt a need for a counter-insurgency aircraft capable of observation, photography and ground support. This official programme led to three aircraft: the SIPA S.1100, the Sud Aviation SE.116 Voltigeur and, slightly later the Dassault Spirale. All three were propeller driven designs with twin engines, though the SIPA was the only one never fitted with turboprops.

The SIPA SE.1100 was a mid wing cantilever monoplane. All its flying surfaces were straight tapered and square tipped; the wing carried flaps. Its 455 kW (610 hp) Pratt & Whitney R-1340 Wasp nine cylinder radial engines were mounted ahead of the wing leading edges, with cowlings which extended rearwards, both above and below the wing, nearly to the trailing edge. Its main wheels retracted backwards into the lower cowling and the tail wheel also retracted.

Its crew compartment was in the extreme nose of a deepened forward fuselage, with multiple transparencies to provide good sideways and downward vision. For ground support work it was fitted with two 20 mm (0.79 in) guns. There were underwing attachment points for other armament packages.

Ten SE.1100 prototypes were ordered but then cancelled before the SE.1100's first flight, flown on 24 April 1958 by Pierre Ponthus. Less than three months later, Ponthus and his colleague André Bouthonnet were killed and the aircraft destroyed when it crashed at Villacoublay during a low level demonstration. The unfinished second prototype was then abandoned.

== Specifications ==
Data from Gaillard (1990) p. 187

General characteristics

- Crew: 3
- Length: 11.30 m (37 ft 1 in)
- Wingspan: 14.70 m (48 ft 3 in)
- Height: 3.75 m (12 ft 4 in)
- Empty weight: 4,000 kg (8,818 lb)
- Max takeoff weight: 6,200 kg (13,669 lb)
- Powerplant: 2 × Pratt & Whitney R-1340 Wasp 9 cylinder radial, 450 kW (610 hp) each

Performance

- Maximum speed: 380 km/h (240 mph, 210 kn) at sea level
- Range: 2,000 km (1,200 mi, 1,100 nmi)

Armament

- Guns: 2×20 mm (0.79 in)
