= Avions Max Holste =

Defunct French aircraft manufacturer

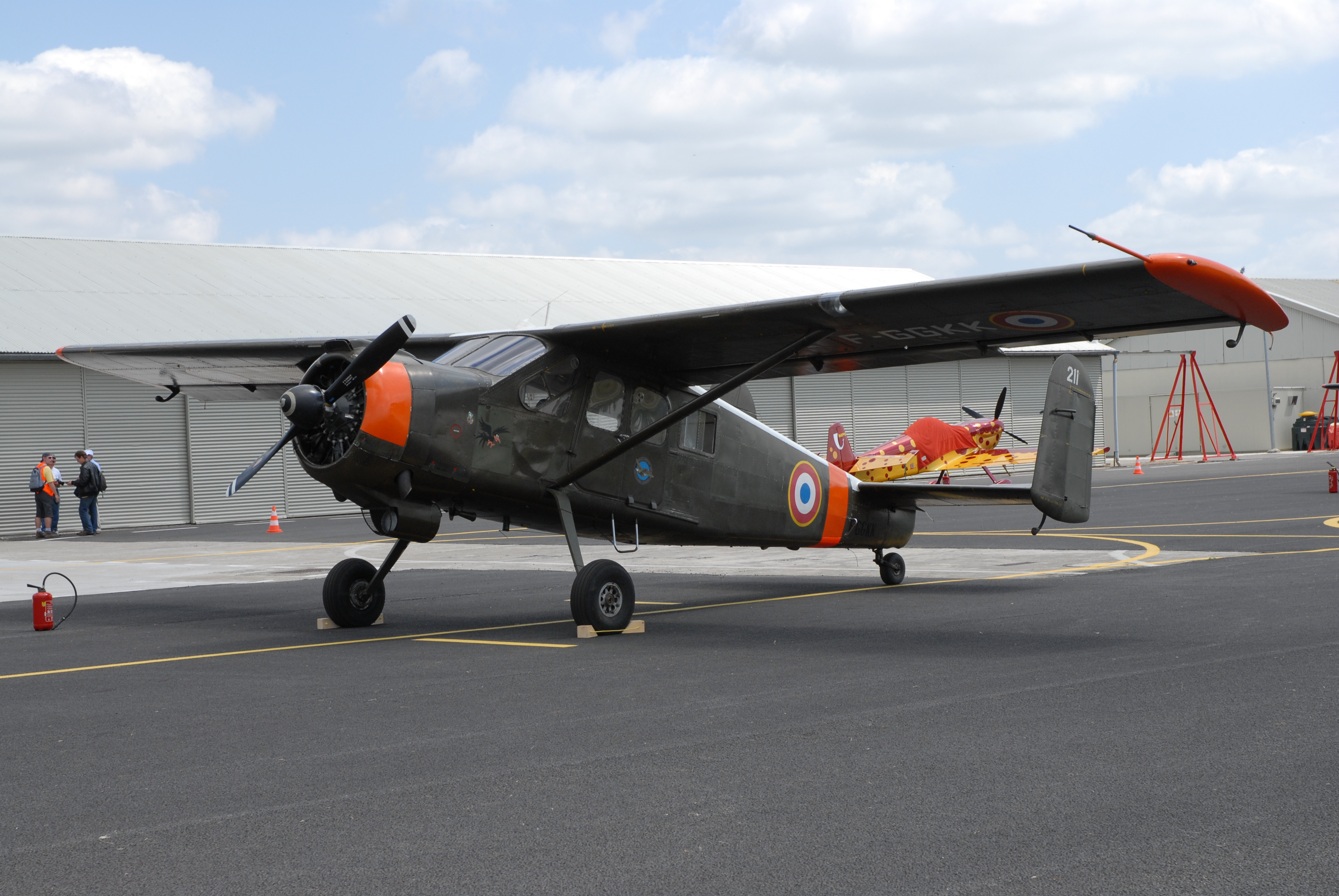
Broussard at Airexpo 2007

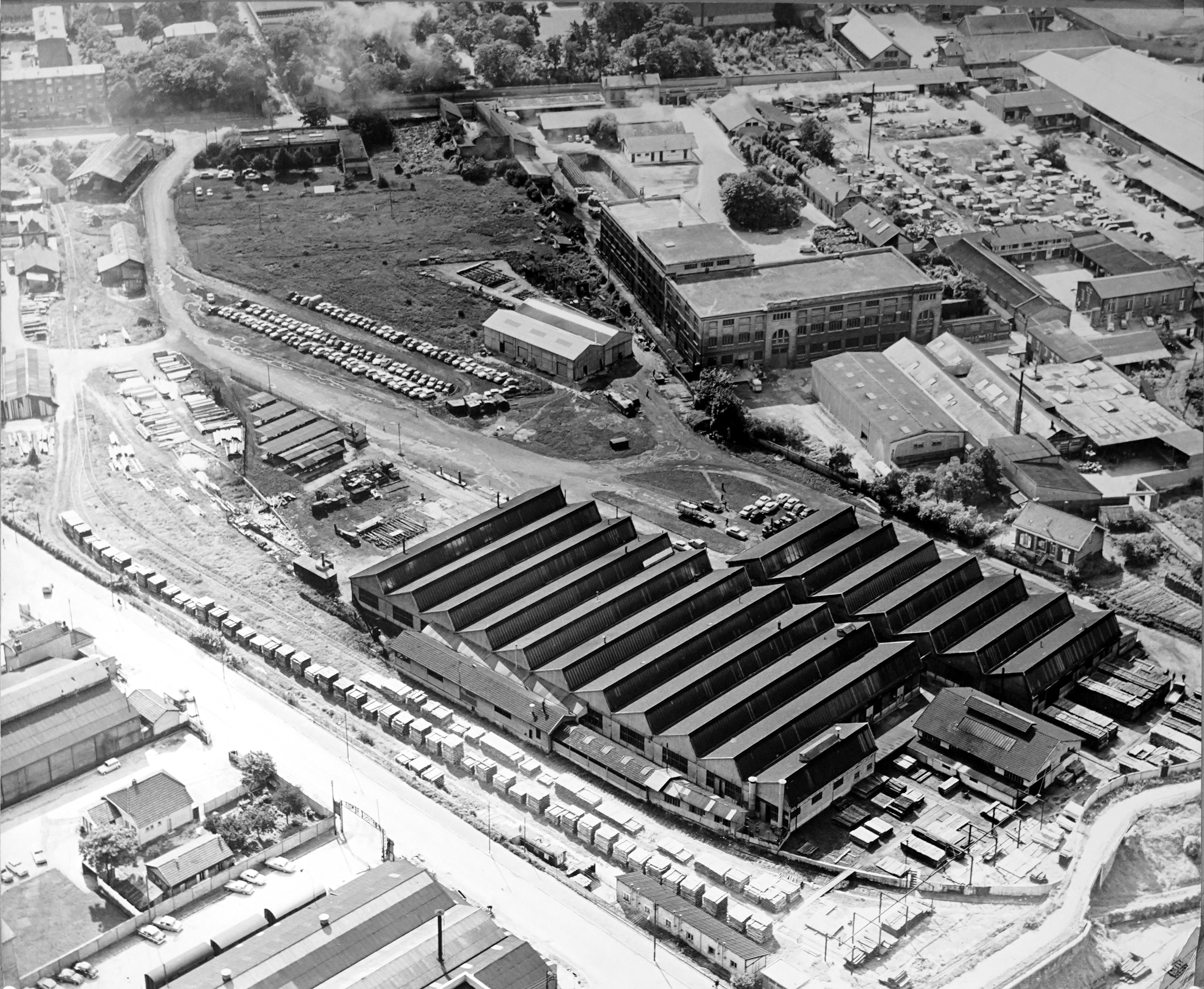
workshops in Reims

Avions Max Holste was a French aircraft manufacturer formed in 1933 by the French aeronautical engineer Max Holste.

== History ==
Following the end of the Second World War the company concentrated on the design of a two-seater light training/touring aircraft, the Max Holste MH.52. A low-wing monoplane with twin fins and rudders, the MH.52 first flew in 1945. The company then built a high-wing version of the MH.52 to meet a French Army requirement. Being too small this was developed into the MH.1521 Broussard and the company went on to build 370 Broussards, mainly for the French military.

Holste then developed a 17-seat MH.250 Super Broussard. The French government placed a contract for ten improved versions as the MH.260. The company was challenged to fill the order and negotiated an agreement with Nord Aviation to help build the aircraft.

The company's financial state deteriorated and on 16 February 1960 the American company Cessna Aircraft Company purchased a 49% share and renamed the company Societe Nouvelle Max Holste. The MH.260 design was handed over to Nord who developed it as the successful Nord 262. The company was renamed again to Reims Aviation and went on to produce Cessna aircraft under licence.

== Aircraft designs ==
- Max Holste MH.52 (1945)
- Max Holste MH.53 (1945)
- Max Holste MH.1521 Broussard (1952)
- Max Holste MH.250 Super Broussard (1959)
- Max Holste MH.260 developed as the Nord 262 (1962)
