= Sud Aviation SE-116 Voltigeur =

Voltigeur
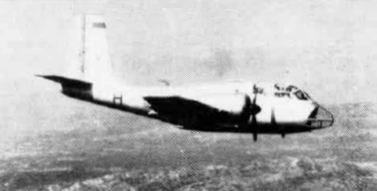
- SE-116 Voltigeur with Wright Cyclone engines

General information
- Type: Army observation and support aircraft
- National origin: France
- Manufacturer: Sud Aviation
- Number built: 3 (all variants)

History
- First flight: 5 June 1958

The twin turboprop Sud Aviation SE-116 Voltigeur of the late 1950s was a French army support aircraft capable of observation and ground attack operations. Three were built but no series production was undertaken.

== Design and development ==
In 1958 France was in the middle of the Algerian War and felt a need for a counter-insurgency aircraft capable of observation, photography and ground support. This official programme led to three aircraft: the SIPA S.1100, the Sud Aviation SE-116 Voltigeur and, slightly later, the Dassault Spirale. All three were propeller driven designs with twin engines.

Originally known as the Fonceur, the Voltigeur was named after the French cavalry units specialising in skirmishes. It was a low wing cantilever monoplane. All its flying surfaces were straight tapered and square tipped; the vertical tail was tall and broad. The first prototype had 597 kW (800 hp) Wright Cyclone nine cylinder radial engines mounted ahead of the wing leading edges, with cowlings, largely above the wing, projecting beyond the trailing edge. On the second prototype the Cyclones were replaced with 567 kW (760 hp) Turbomeca Bastan turboprops in much more slender cowlings on the top of the wings. The Voltigeur had tricycle gear with main legs that retracted backwards into under-engine cowlings; the nose wheel retracted into the fuselage. Each main leg carried a pair of wheels to assist with take-offs and landings on rough strips.

The Voltigeur had a conventional, multi-panel, glazed cabin and a glazed nose offering good ground views. Behind the wing trailing edge the fuselage carried perforated airbrakes for ground attacks; the Voltigeur was fitted with two 20 mm (0.79 in) guns and six underwing attachment points for bombs and rockets.

The piston-engined Voltigeur was first flown on 5 June 1958 by Roger Carpentier who also took the turboprop version on its first flight on 15 December 1958. A few weeks later, on 9 January 1959, Carpentier, Yves Crouzet and Marcel Hochet were killed when tail flutter developed in a high-speed run. After tests of the SE-117 first pre-production machine, conducted in collaboration with Marcel Dassault, the Voltigeur programme was abandoned along with a projected fast transport, the SE-118 Diplomate.

== Variants ==
Data from Gaillard (1990).

SE-116 Voltigeur
First two aircraft, the first with Wright Cyclones radials and the second with Turbomeca Bastan turboprops.
SE-117 Voltigeur
Third airframe and first production aircraft, Turbomeca Bastan powered, tested in collaboration with Marcel Dassault.
SE-118 Diplomate
Projected fast transport, abandoned.

== Specifications (SE-117 Voltigeur) ==
Data from Jane's All the World's Aircraft 1959-60.

General characteristics

- Crew: 2-3
- Length: 12.28 m (40 ft 3 in)
- Wingspan: 17.97 m (58 ft 11 in)
- Height: 5.71 m (18 ft 9 in)
- Wing area: 41.7 m^{2} (449 sq ft)
- Empty weight: 4,200 kg (9,259 lb)
- Max takeoff weight: 6,520 kg (14,374 lb) with external stores, 5,635 kg (12,423 lb) without stores
- Powerplant: 2 × Turbomeca Bastan turboprop, 570 kW (760 hp) each
- Propellers: 3-bladed

Performance

- Maximum speed: 455 km/h (283 mph, 246 kn)
- Take-off run: 200–290 m (660–950 ft)
- Landing run: 200 m (660 ft)

Armament

- Guns: 2× DEFA 522 30 mm (1.18 in) cannon
- Hardpoints: 6 under wing for bombs, rockets and other stores

== Bibliography ==
- Mesnard, Joël (2019). "Soldier of Misfortune: The Ill-Fated SNCASE SE.116/17 Voltigeur". The Aviation Historian (29): 88–99. ISSN 2051-1930.
