= Reims Aviation =

Aircraft manufacturer in France

Reims Aviation Industries
- Predecessor: Avions Max Holste
- Defunct: 17 April 2014
- Fate: liquidated, Sold to Continental Motors, Inc.
- Headquarters: Reims, France
- Parent: GECI Aviation

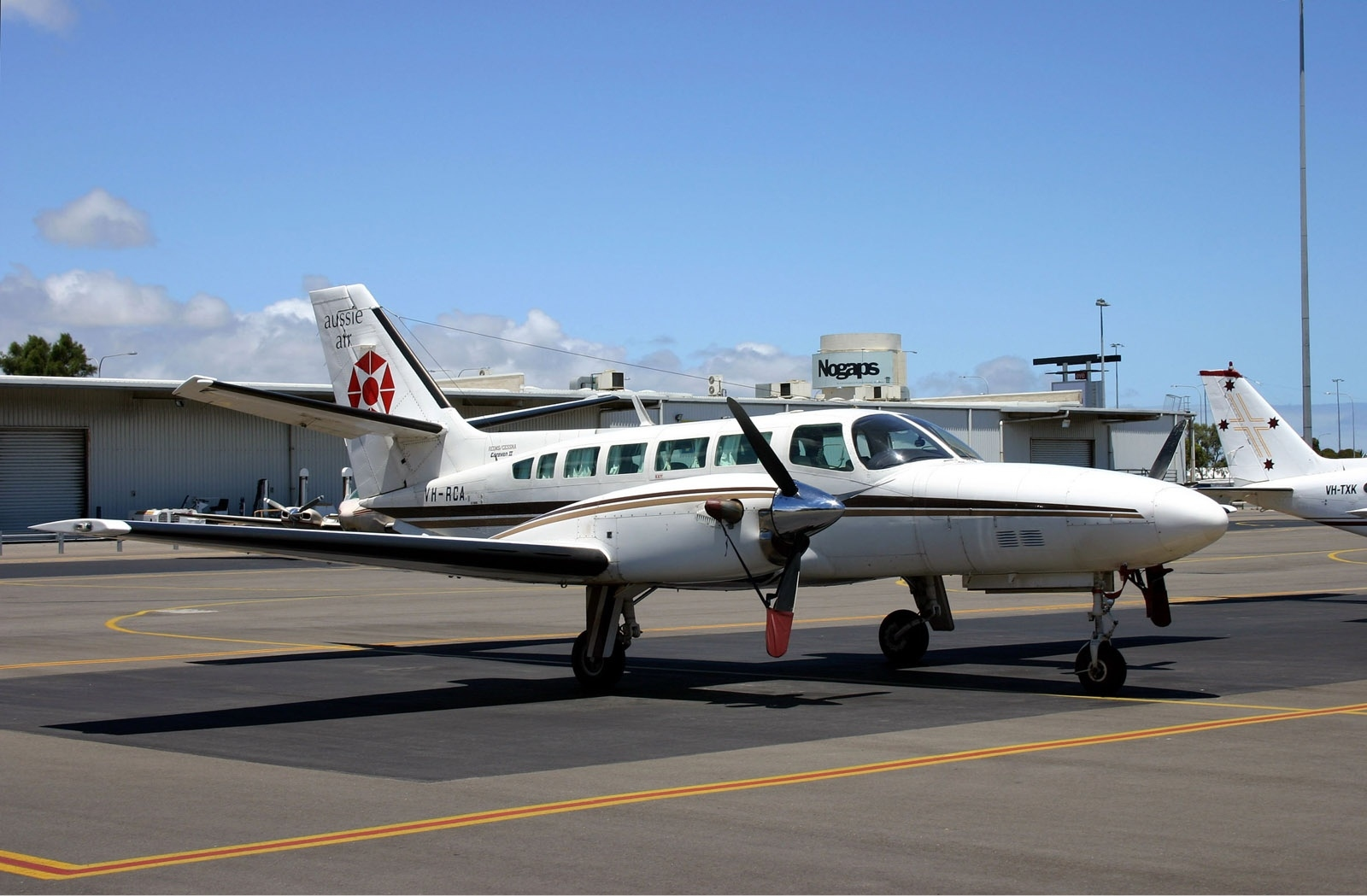
Reims F406

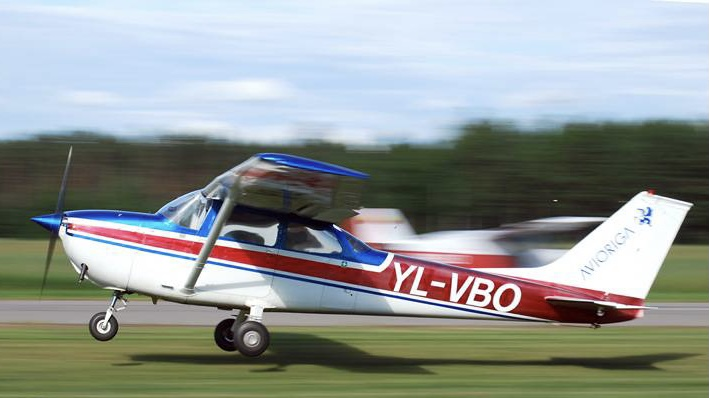
Reims F172K

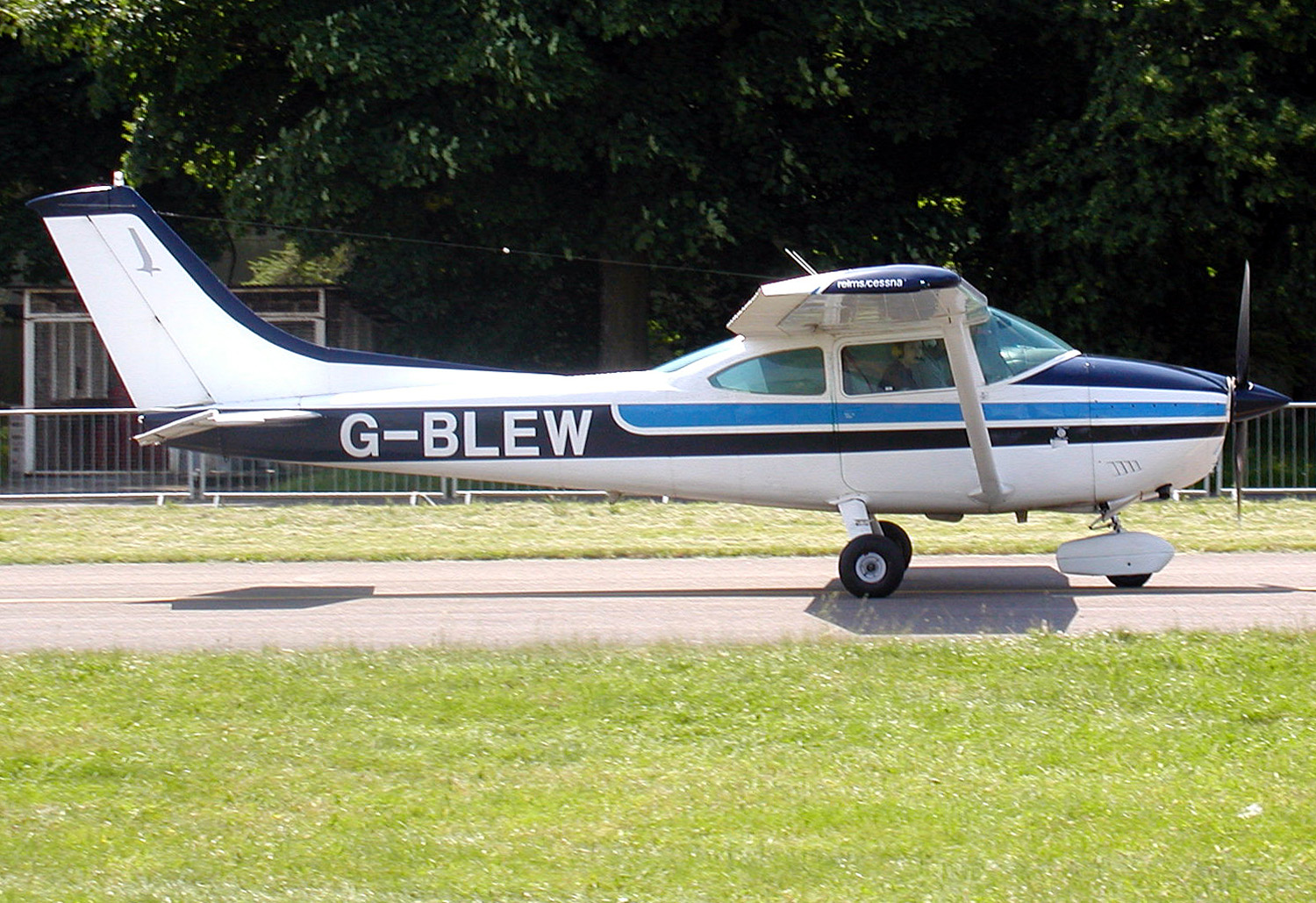
1977 Reims F182Q

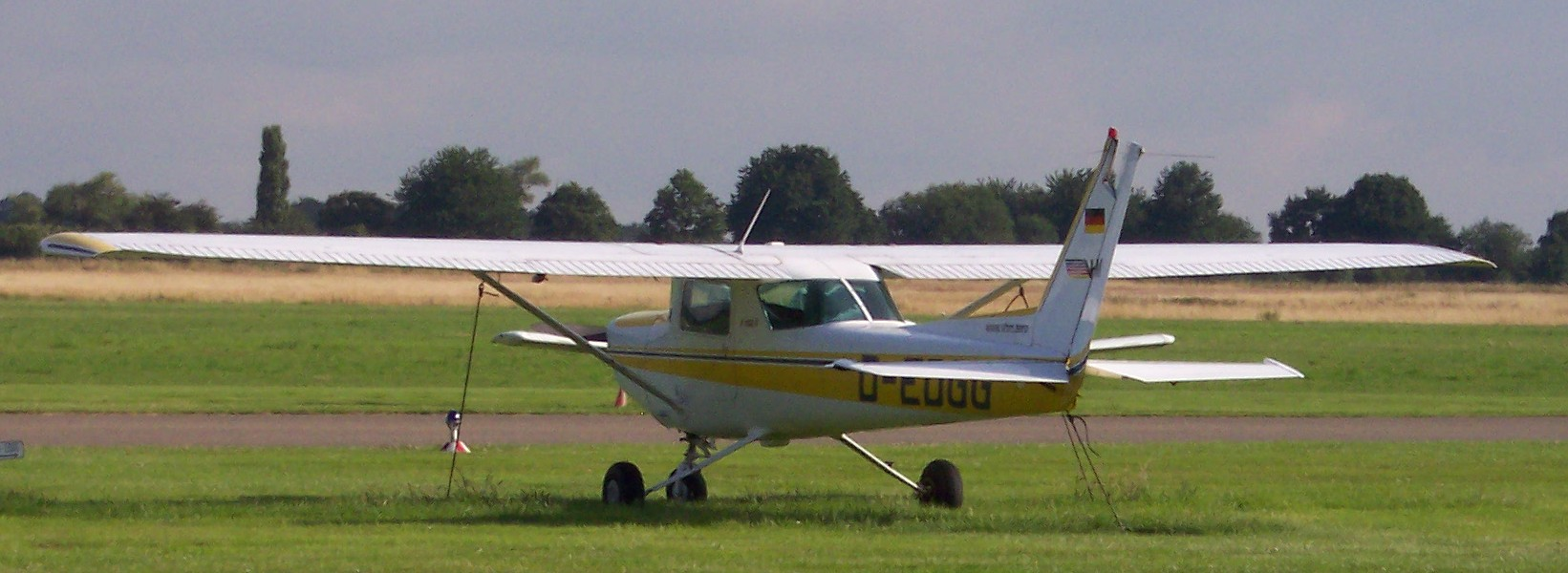
Reims F152

Reims Aviation Industries was a French aircraft manufacturer located in the city of Reims, most recently producing the F406 Caravan II. Reims Aviation was a wholly owned subsidiary of GECI Aviation.

== History ==
Max Holste, the company founder, built his first aircraft in 1931, a light two-seater aircraft called the SHB1. In 1946, he started his own aircraft company, Avions Max Holste, in downtown Reims. In the 1950s, two new models were designed: the MH.1521 Broussard in 1950 and the MH.260 Super Broussard in 1959. In 1960, a cooperative agreement was signed with Cessna to produce light aircraft for the European market. The company was officially born as Reims Aviation in 1962, mainly producing the FR172 Reims Rocket, a more powerful version of the Cessna 172. In 1989, Reims Aviation bought back all the shares held by Cessna and became a private French aircraft manufacturer. Production of the single-engined airplanes was halted, and only the F406 remained in production.

The company entered receivership on 10 September 2013. On 25 March 2014, the Commercial Court of Reims approved the transfer of the Company's aircraft maintenance, cabin management, integration and installation systems assets to ASI Innovation and the transfer of its F406 assets to Continental Motors, Inc. With the disposition of the company's assets, its parent company, GECI Aviation, was also liquidated on 17 April 2014. Continental has indicated that it plans to continue the production of the F406 in Mobile, Alabama.

== Products ==
The F406 was the last model still in production at the time of bankruptcy. All aircraft were made in cooperation with Cessna.

- Reims F150
- Reims F152
- Reims F172
- Reims FR172 Rocket
- Reims F177
- Reims F182
- Reims F337
- Reims-Cessna F406 Caravan II
