= RACSA =

RACSA may refer to:

- RACSA (airline), Guatemala
- Royal Advisory Council for Saharan Affairs
