= Turbomeca Bastan =

1950s French turboprop aircraft engine

Bastan
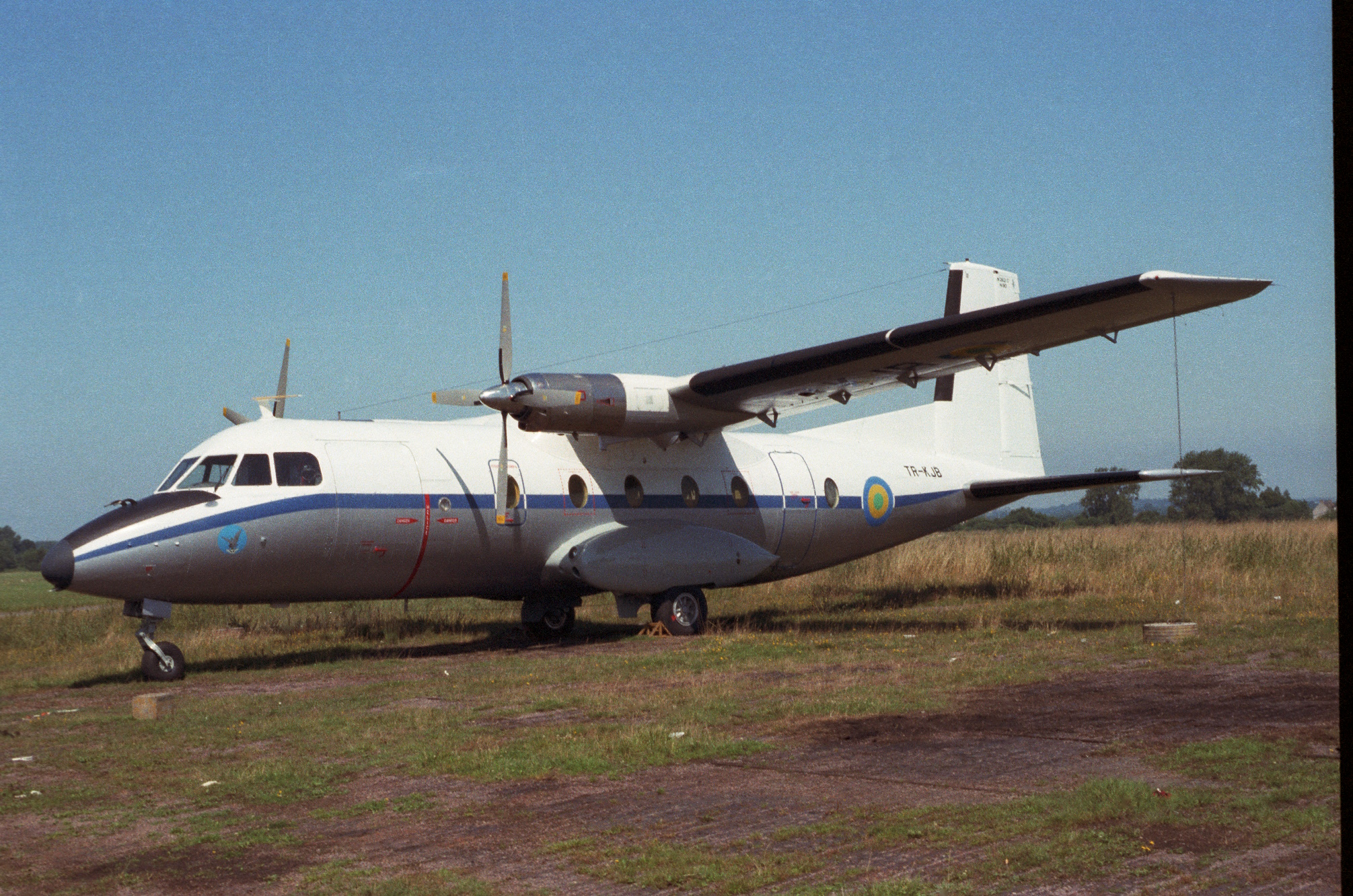
- A Nord 262 at Dinard–Pleurtuit–Saint-Malo Airport showing the Bastan engines as installed
- Type: Turboprop
- National origin: France
- Manufacturer: Turbomeca
- First run: 1957
- Major applications: Aérospatiale N 262; Nord 260
- Developed into: Turbomeca Aubisque

The Turbomeca Bastan was a turboprop engine developed in France in 1957. Early models developed 650 shp (485 kW), but by 1965 this had been increased to 1,048 shp (780 kW) with the Bastan VII.

Flight tests of some Bastan models were carried out using a Lockheed Constellation flying test bed. The engine's principal applications were the Aérospatiale N 262 (Nord 262) and Nord 260 airliners.

The Bastan was also developed into the Turbomeca Aubisque turbofan.

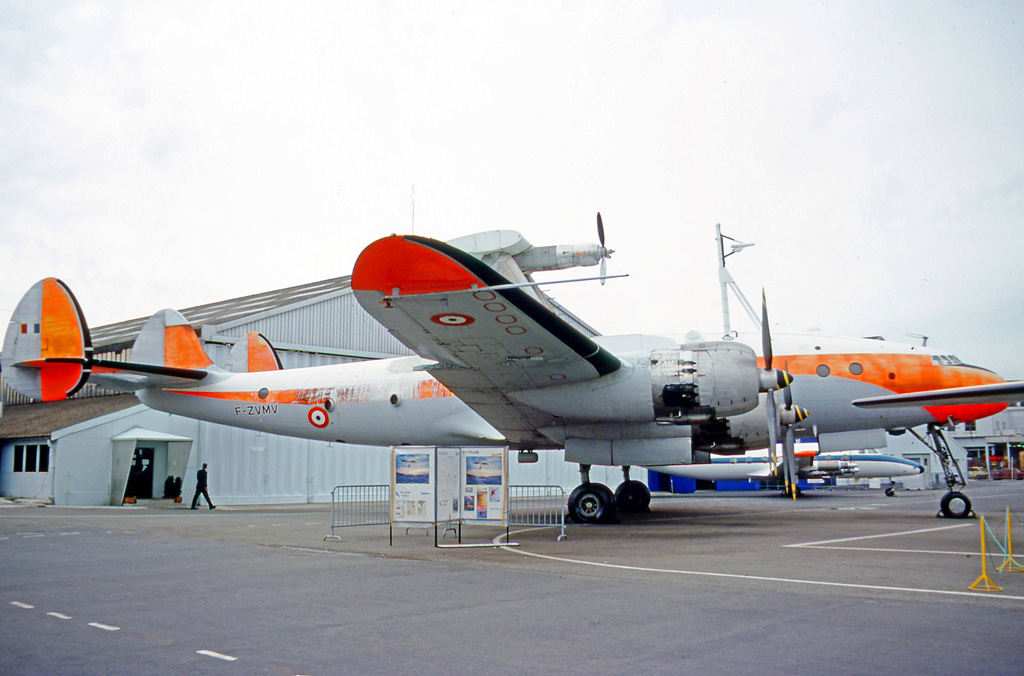
A Bastan under test, mounted above a Lockheed Constellation in 1977

== Applications ==
- Aérospatiale N 262
- Dassault Communauté
- FMA IA 50 Guaraní II
- Nord 260
- Sud Aviation SE.116 Voltigeur
- Sud Aviation SE.117 Voltigeur

== Variants ==
Bastan IV
Bastan VI
Bastan VIA1
Bastan VIB1
Bastan VIB2
Bastan VIC
Bastan VIC1
Bastan VII
Bastan 16
Bastafan
Bi-Bastan IV
A paired Bastan IV developed for French-modified Sikorsky S-58 helicopters. De-rated to 1,119 kW (1,500 hp)

== Specifications (Bastan VIC) ==
Data from Janes's All The World's Aircraft 1965-66.

==== General characteristics ====
- Type: Turboprop
- Length: 2,034 mm (80.1 in)
- Diameter: 685 mm (26.97 in) width, 775.5 mm (30.53 in)
- Dry weight: 212 kg (467 lb)

==== Components ====
- Compressor: Single-stage axial compressor followed by single-stage centrifugal compressor
- Combustors: Direct flow annular type
- Turbine: Three-stage axial flow

==== Performance ====
- Maximum power output: 794 kW (1,065 ehp)
- Overall pressure ratio: 5.83:1
- Specific fuel consumption: 352 g/kWh (0.578 lb/eshp hr)
- Power-to-weight ratio: 3.7 kW/kg (2.3 lb/ehp)

== See also ==
Related development

- Turbomeca Aubisque

Related lists

- List of aircraft engines
