= Altair Airlines =

American airline from 1967 to 1982

IATA	ICAO	Call sign
AK	ALT	ALTAIR
- Founded: 1967; 59 years ago
- Ceased operations: 1982; 44 years ago
- Fleet size: 9 (in 1982)
- Headquarters: Philadelphia, Pennsylvania, United States
- Key people: Henry P. Hill

Altair Airlines was an airline based in Philadelphia. It was in service from 1967 to 1982. According to its June 15, 1982 system timetable, the Altair name was taken from the first magnitude star "Altairius" brightest in the constellation "Aquila" (Eagle) from which the airline's Blue Eagle symbol was derived.

== History ==
The airline was established in 1967 as a commuter airline operating small piston twin aircraft. In 1967, Altair's main shareholder was Tristram Colket and it had 587 employees. In May 1970, Altair Airlines was reported by the Civil Aeronautics Board to have the highest bumping rate. By the late 1970s, Altair had introduced Nord 262 turboprops to its fleet in addition to Beechcraft 99 commuter turboprops.

Altair attempted to attain sustained profitability by retiring its turboprop aircraft and expanding its scheduled passenger services to new destinations along the U.S. east coast in tandem with the introduction of a small fleet of Fokker F28 Fellowship and McDonnell Douglas DC-9-30 twin jets; however, income was never able to outpace the debts incurred. In November 1982, Altair owed more than one million dollars in jet fuel costs to Gulf Oil Corporation who, after a protracted period of negotiating, demanded immediate payment. Altair had little choice but to seek legal protection. In 1982, Altair filed for bankruptcy due to its many debts. Its last president was Henry P. Hill. Many of Altair's dedicated employees found employment at other airlines with facilities at Philadelphia International Airport (PHL).

== Fleet ==
When it ceased operations in November 1982, Altair Airlines was an all-jet air carrier operating a fleet of six Fokker F28 Fellowship series 4000 and three McDonnell Douglas DC-9-30 jetliners. The airline called their jet aircraft "Starjets". Altair previously operated Beechcraft 99 and Nord 262 commuter turboprop aircraft prior to introducing jet service and expanding its routes.

== Destinations in 1969 ==
According to its July 1, 1969 system timetable, Altair was operating scheduled passenger service with small Beechcraft 99 turboprop commuter aircraft with flights serving the following destinations primarily in the northeast U.S.

- Albany, New York (ALB)
- Allentown, Pennsylvania/Bethlehem, Pennsylvania/Easton, Pennsylvania (ABE)
- Baltimore, Maryland (BWI)
- Harrisburg, Pennsylvania (MDT)
- Philadelphia, Pennsylvania (PHL) – Hub & airline headquarters
- Reading, Pennsylvania (RDG)
- Richmond, Virginia (RIC)
- Washington, D.C. National Airport (DCA)
- White Plains, New York (HPN)
- Wilkes-Barre, Pennsylvania/Scranton, Pennsylvania (AVP)
- Wilmington, Delaware (ILG)

By 1976, Bridgeport, Connecticut (BDR), Hartford, Connecticut (BDL) and Islip, New York (ISP) had been added to the Altair route system and by 1980 Binghamton, New York (BGM), Charlotte, North Carolina (CLT), Elmira, New York (ILM), New Bern/Morehead City, North Carolina (EWN), New York Newark Airport (EWR) and Raleigh/Durham, North Carolina (RDU) had been added as well.

== Destinations in 1982 ==
According to its June 15, 1982 system timetable, Altair was serving the following destinations in the eastern U.S. with all flights being operated with either Fokker F28 Fellowship or McDonnell Douglas DC-9-30 jets.

- Buffalo, New York (BUF)
- Charleston, South Carolina (CHS)
- Greensboro, North Carolina (GSO)
- Hartford, Connecticut (BDL)
- Jacksonville, Florida (JAX)
- Norfolk, Virginia (ORF)
- Philadelphia, Pennsylvania (PHL) – Hub & airline headquarters
- Providence, Rhode Island (PVD)
- Raleigh/Durham, North Carolina (RDU)
- Rochester, New York (ROC)
- Sarasota, Florida (SRQ)
- Savannah, Georgia (SAV)
- Tampa, Florida (TPA)
- Washington, D.C. National Airport (DCA)

== See also ==
- List of defunct airlines of the United States
