= Aérospatiale N 262 =

French regional airliner with 2 turboprop engines, 1962

N 262 / Frégate
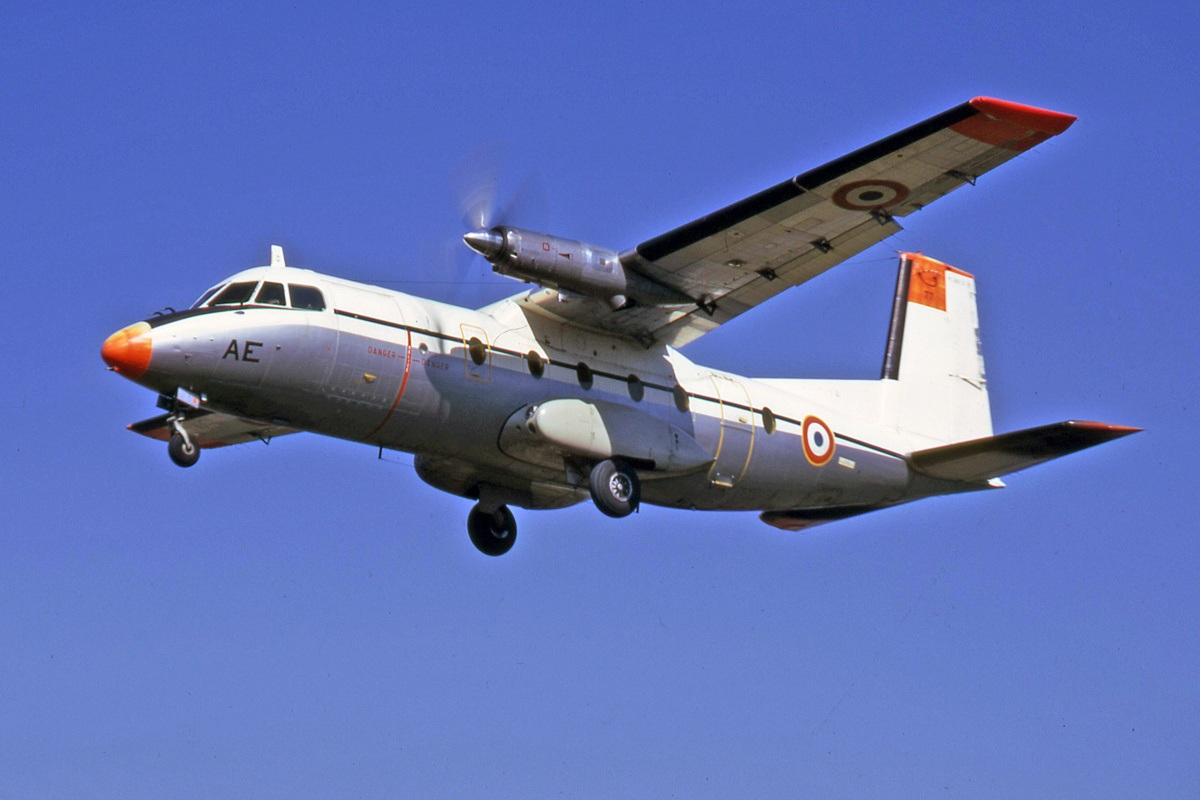
- Aerospatiale/Nord N 262D-51 Frégate, c/n 105, radio callsign F-RBAE, French Air Force

General information
- Type: Turboprop airliner
- National origin: France
- Manufacturer: Aérospatiale
- Primary users: French Air Force French Navy; Allegheny Airlines
- Number built: 110

History
- Manufactured: 1962–1976
- Introduction date: 1964
- First flight: N 262: 24 December 1962
- Developed from: Nord 260

The Aérospatiale N 262 is a French twin-turboprop high-wing airliner built first by Nord Aviation (merged into Aérospatiale in 1970). The aircraft was also known as the Nord 262.

== Design and development ==
In 1957, the French aircraft manufacturer Max Holste began work on a twin-engined utility transport aircraft to replace the Douglas DC-3/C-47 Skytrain. The prototype, the Max Holste MH.250 Super Broussard, was powered by two Pratt & Whitney Wasp radial engines and first flew on 20 May 1959. A second prototype, the MH.260, powered by Turbomeca Bastan turboprop engines flew on 29 July 1960. In 1959, state-owned Nord Aviation (later merged with Sud Aviation and renamed Aérospatiale) signed an agreement with Max Holste to market and help produce the MH.260. Financial problems at Max Holste, however, led to Nord taking on the whole programme, which included further development of the aircraft, while Max Holste concentrated on the production of light aircraft, and was renamed Reims Aviation.

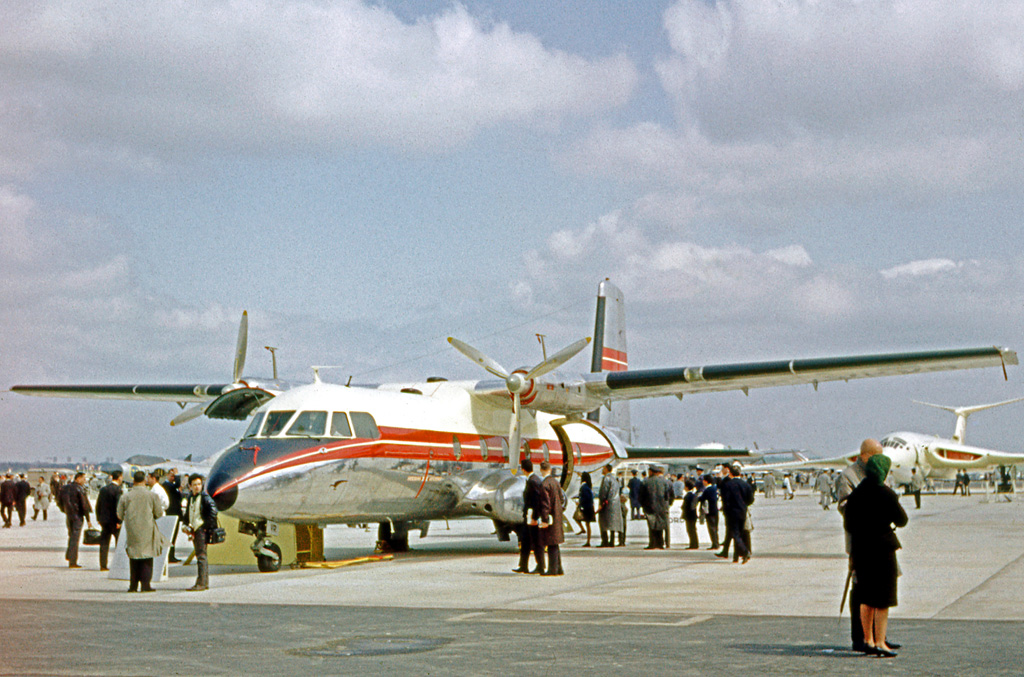
The Prototype Nord 262 at the 1963 Paris Air Show at Le Bourget Airport

While nine MH.260s were built, the type found no commercial buyers, and Nord redesigned the aircraft to have a pressurized cabin and to meet US airworthiness requirements. The new airliner, the Nord 262, was like the MH.260, a high-winged high-wing cantilever monoplane of all-metal construction, powered by two Turbomeca Bastan, and fitted with a retractable tricycle undercarriage, with the main wheels retracting into fuselage-mounted fairings. Pressurization brought a new circular-section fuselage, which normally was fitted with seats for 26 passengers, with a maximum capacity of 29 passengers.

The first prototype took to the skies for the first time on 24 December 1962 and the aircraft was exhibited at the June 1963 Paris Air Show. The aircraft received its French airworthiness certificate on 16 July 1964 and entered initial commercial service with Air Inter of France in September that year.

Four of the first aircraft 262A, 262B, 262C, and 262D were built, the first two fitted with Bastan IVC engines, while the C and D models were fitted with the higher-powered Bastan VIIC. Of these four aircraft, the latter two saw their first air time in July 1968. Most sales of the initial aircraft were not in the passenger field, but rather the military field. The 262D was the most popular and marketed as Frégate.

As for the American designation, the "Mohawk 298" airplanes were modified Nord 262s and first flew on 7 January 1975, equipped with Pratt & Whitney Canada PT6A-45 turboprops. Built in order to meet United States FAR 298 regulation, the modification of the aircraft was overseen by Mohawk Air Services and outsourced to Frakes Aviation. Allegheny Airlines was the initial operator of the aircraft.

Joel Krane, the chairman of the FOEB (Flight Operations Evaluation Board) determined that a common type rating could be issued for the Nord 262 and Mohawk 298. Appropriate differences training would be required for transitioning pilots.

== Variants ==
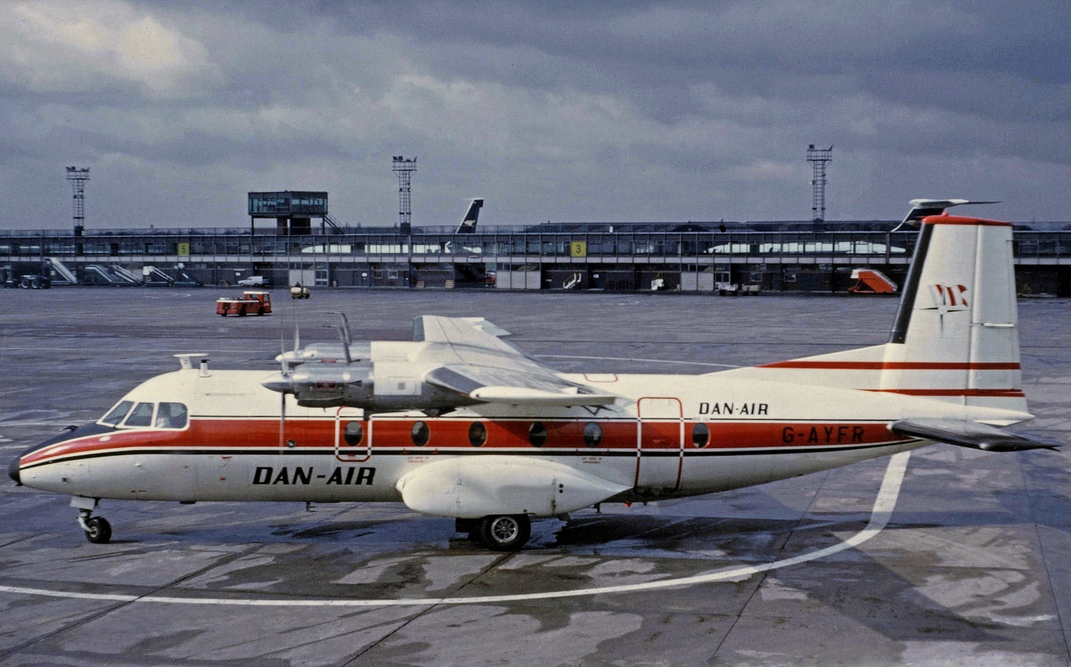
Nord 262A of Dan-Air operating a scheduled service at Manchester Airport in 1971

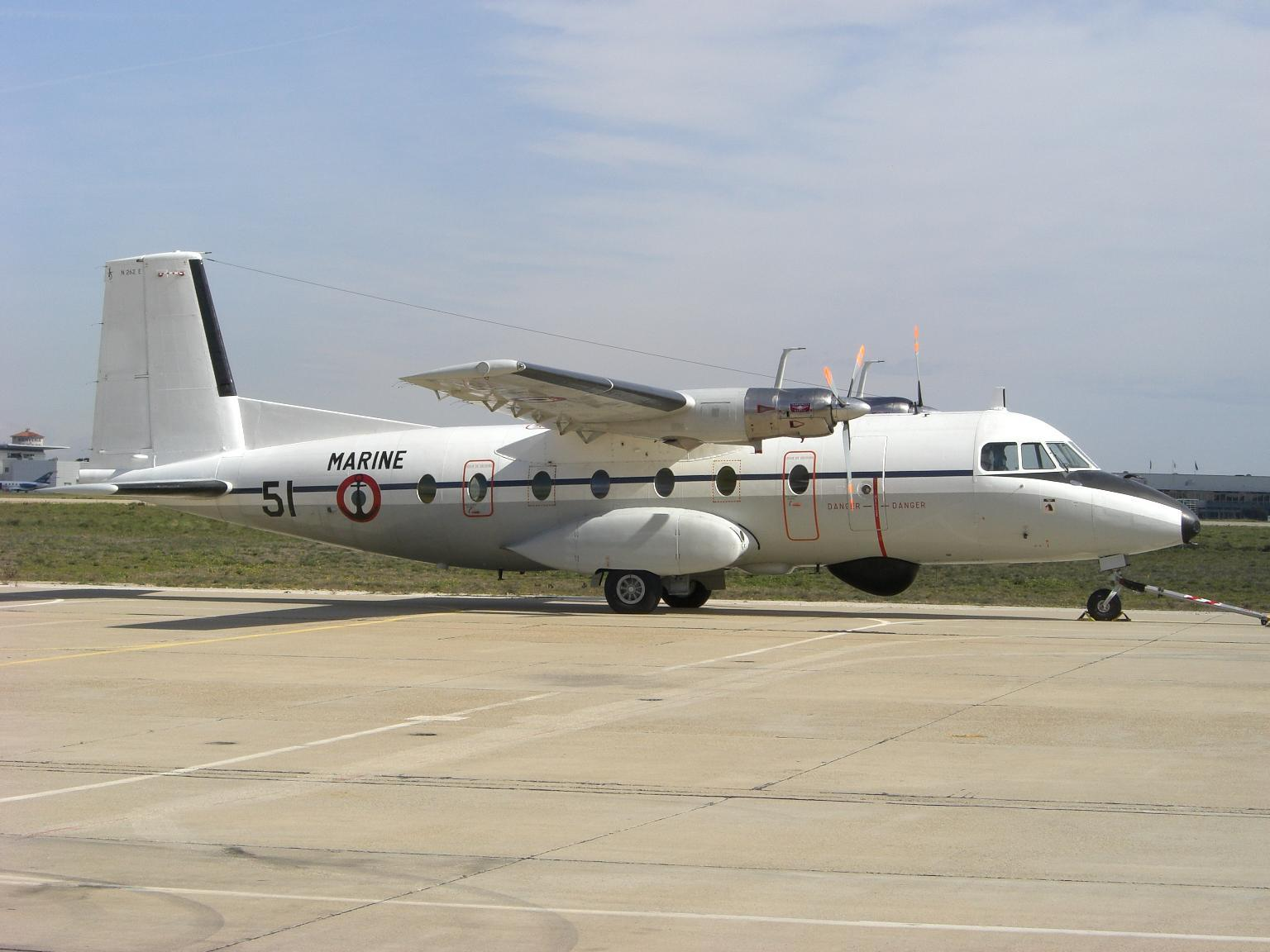
N262E of the Aviation navale, at the Nîmes-Garons' French Navy base

Max Holste MH.250 Super Broussard
Prototype 17-seat transport first flown in 1959.
Max Holste MH.260 Super Broussard
23 passenger production variant of the MH.250, ten ordered but not completed before development handed over to Nord Aviation.
N 262
Prototypes and initial production version
N 262A
Early standard production version (preceded by N 262B). Powered by Turbomeca Bastan VIC engines. Certified 15 March 1965 with first delivery to Lake Central Airlines on 17 August 1965.
N 262B
Initial production version for Air Inter, powered by two Bastan VIC turboprops. Four built, with first example flown 8 June 1964, certification 16 July 1964 and delivery 24 July 1964.
N 262C Frégate
Bastan VIIC engines and greater wingspan
N 262D Frégate
French Air Force version of N-262C
N 262E
A maritime patrol and training version used by the Aviation navale (French Navy).
Mohawk 298
Nine aircraft updated by Frakes Aviation for Allegheny Airlines between 1975 and 1978. Powered by Pratt & Whitney Canada PT6A-45 engines driving five-bladed propellers.

== Operators ==
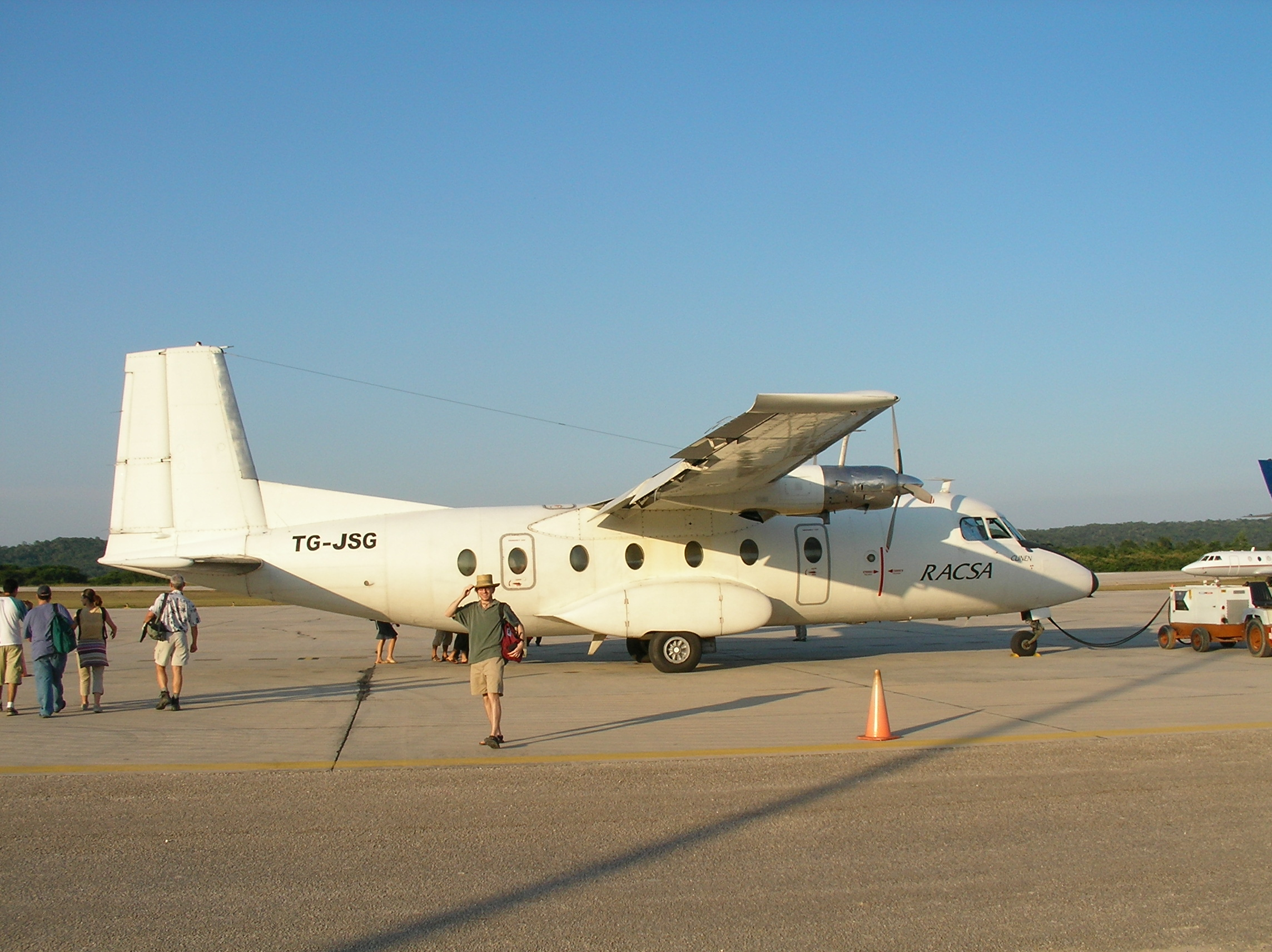
A Nord 262 spotted in service in Guatemala, November 2004.

As of July 2011, a total of three Nord 262 aircraft remain in airline service with the following airlines:

- Equatorial International Airlines (1),
- International Trans Air Business (1)
- RACSA (1).

=== Former operators ===
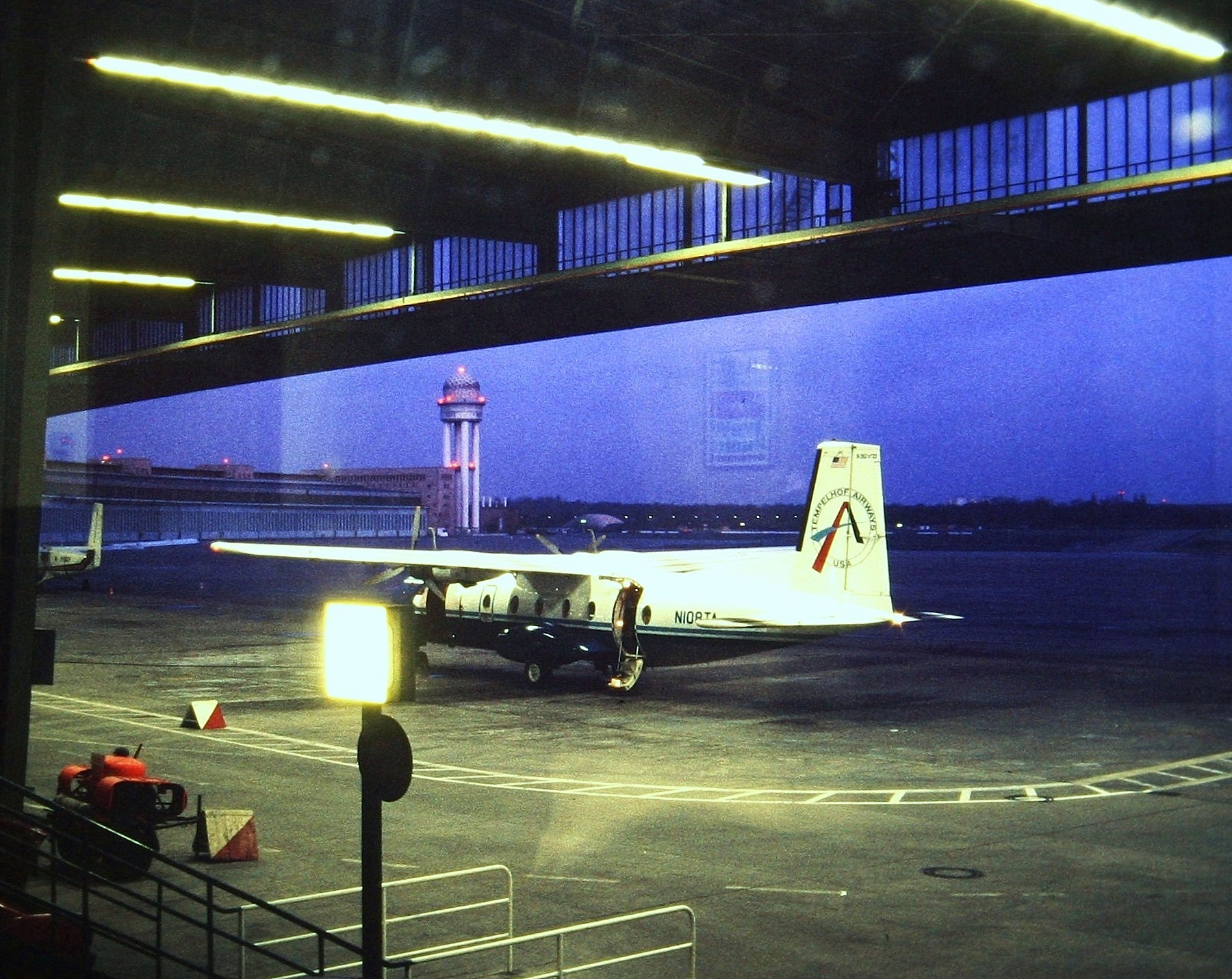
Nord 262 of Tempelhof Airways, Airport Tempelhof, 1988

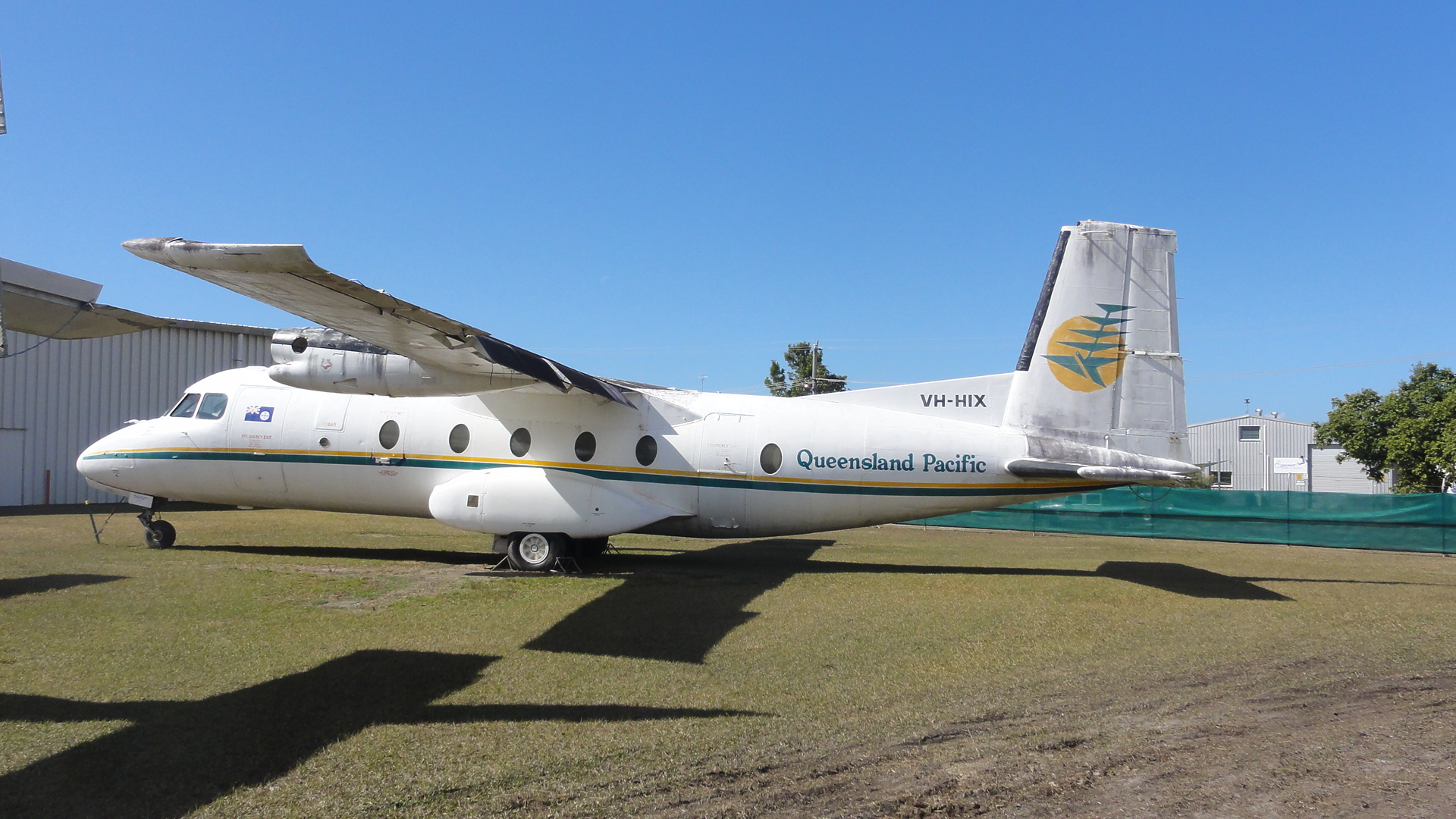
Queensland Pacific Nord Aviation Mohawk at Queensland Air Museum

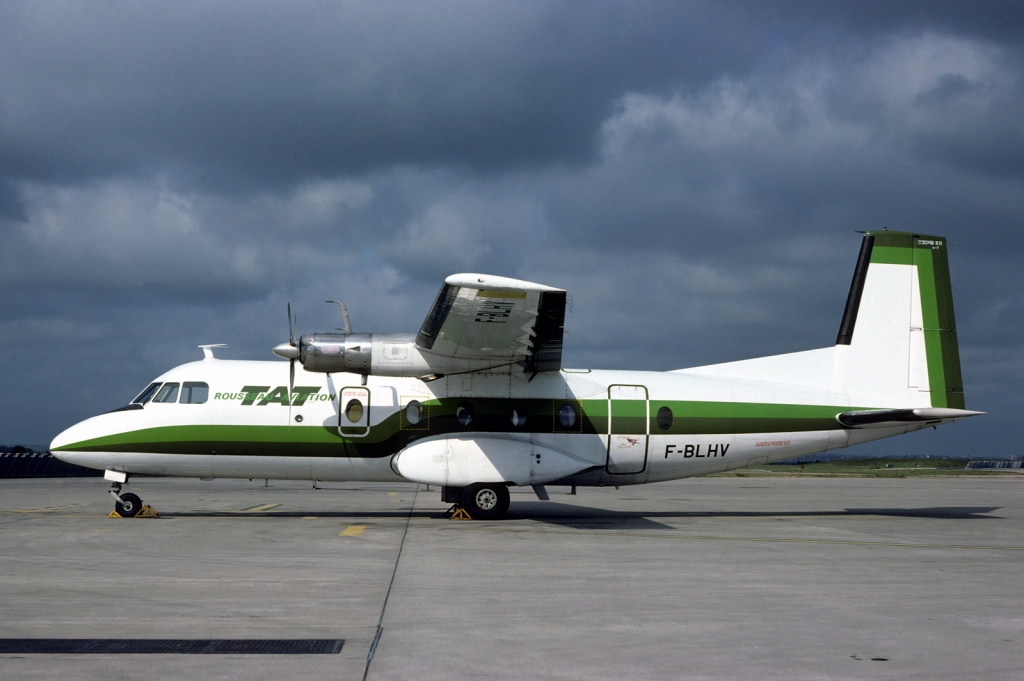
Touraine Air Transport (TAT) Nord 262B, 1976 (note dual Rousseau Aviation titles)

- Aerovias
- Air Ceylon
- Air Florida Commuter (operated by National Commuter Airlines)
- Air Inter
- Air Madagascar
- Alisarda
- Allegheny Airlines (Mohawk 298 conversion)
- Altair Airlines
- B.C. Air Lines (acquired by Pacific Western Airlines)
- Cimber Air
- Crown Airways
- Dan-Air
- Delta Air Transport
- Filipinas Orient Airways
- Golden Gate Airlines (former Swift Aire aircraft)
- IFG Interregional Fluggesellschaft
- Indonesia Airlines
- Japan Domestic Airlines
- Lake Central Airlines
- Linjeflyg
- Malu Aviation
- Mohawk Air Service
- National Commuter Airlines (NATCOM) (operated both Nord 262 and Mohawk 298 aircraft in Air Florida Commuter feeder service)
- Pacific Western Airlines (former B.C. Air Lines aircraft)
- Pocono Airlines
- Queensland Pacific Airlines
- Ransome Airlines
- Rhein Air (Switzerland)
- Rousseau Aviation
- Scheduled Skyways (commuter air carrier based in Fayetteville, AR, USA)
- Swift Aire Lines (commuter air carrier based in San Luis Obispo, CA, USA)
- Tempelhof Airways
- TAT - Touraine Air Transport
- Trans Service Airlift
- Tunis Air
- Wideroe

=== Military operators ===
Angola

- National Air Force of Angola

Burkina Faso
Republic of the Congo

- Congolese Air Force

France

- French Air Force
- French Navy

Gabon

== Specifications (Nord 262A) ==
Data from Jane's All The World's Aircraft 1965–66

General characteristics

- Crew: 2
- Capacity: 29 passengers
- Length: 19.28 m (63 ft 3 in)
- Wingspan: 21.90 m (71 ft 10 in)
- Height: 6.21 m (20 ft 4 in)
- Wing area: 55.0 m^{2} (592 sq ft)
- Aspect ratio: 8.72:1
- Airfoil: NACA 23016 at root, NACA 23012 (mod.) at tip
- Empty weight: 6,654 kg (14,670 lb)
- Max takeoff weight: 10,300 kg (22,708 lb)
- Fuel capacity: 2,000 L (530 US gal; 440 imp gal)
- Powerplant: 2 × Turbomeca Bastan VIC turboprops, 794 kW (1,065 shp) each (eshp)
- Propellers: 3-bladed Ratier-Figae FH.146 variable-pitch propellers, 3.20 m (10 ft 6 in) diameter

Performance

- Maximum speed: 385 km/h (239 mph, 208 kn)
- Cruise speed: 360 km/h (220 mph, 190 kn) (econ cruise)
- Stall speed: 128 km/h (80 mph, 69 kn) (wheels and flaps down)
- Never exceed speed: 498 km/h (309 mph, 269 kn)
- Range: 1,110 km (690 mi, 600 nmi) (max fuel, 2,010 kg (4,430 lb) payload)
- Service ceiling: 7,300 m (24,000 ft)
- Rate of climb: 6.4 m/s (1,250 ft/min)
- Takeoff distance to 10.5 m (35 ft): 1,200 m (4,000 ft)
- Landing distance from 15 m (50 ft): 1,100 m (3,500 ft)

== Aircraft on display ==
Nord 262 N106TA at Berlin-Tempelhof airport

- N106TA (msn. 34) originally delivered to Alisarda in 1967, last operated by Tempelhof Airways and retired in 1991. Later used by the fire brigade of Berlin Tempelhof Airport and left abandoned, now in derelict state, at the former Berlin airport.

== See also ==
Related development

- Nord 260

Aircraft of comparable role, configuration, and era

- ATR 42
- British Aerospace Jetstream 41
- Fokker F27 Friendship
- Let L-410 Turbolet

Related lists

- List of civil aircraft
