= Max Holste =

French aeronautical engineer (1913–1998)

Max Holste (13 September 1913 in Nice – 19 August 1998 in Toulon) was a French aeronautical engineer and founder of an aircraft manufacturer company of the same name in Reims, France (now Reims Aviation). His company developed and produced many civil and military piston engine aircraft, including the famous MH-1521 Broussard. He was also one of the lead engineers of the Embraer Bandeirante project.

One of Holste's aircraft early designs, the MH52, fared well in competitions; based on this success, Holste designed a high-wing radial-engined utility aircraft, which became the Broussard. The company had good sales of the Broussard, due to high demand from the French military during the Algerian War; this government demand effectively prevented export of the aircraft. Holste planned to improve the design, first as a twin-piston, then as a twin-turbine version, but too late: the company had been complacent with initial high demand for the Broussard but sales fell as it became outdated. Holste was ruined, and his factory taken over by his associate and WWII ace Pierre Clostermann with capital from Cessna, and renamed Reims Aviation. The new design eventually became the Nord 262.

Holste left France for Brazil in 1964, having contacts there from Broussard sales visits. Brazil's nascent aviation industry welcomed the designer as a star. He fulfilled a government requirement as lead designer on the Bandeirante project, which first flew four years later. Unhappy, he formed his own company, and lived in neighbouring countries for the following years.

Ruined again, recently divorced, and not on speaking terms with his children, he returned to France with a South American nurse in 1995, aged 82. He initially settled at Bormes-les-Mimosas, near his first wife Paule, then at Hyères; Paule described him as having 'a difficult character'. He died in anonymity in 1998 and was buried in Hyères; reportedly no-one attended his burial. In 2016 a commemorative service was held at Holste's grave in his honour.

== Bibliography ==
Media related to Max Holste at Wikimedia Commons

- Polacco, Michel (2017). Une histoire d'amour. Info-Pilote, 736, pp. 64–67
