= Museu do Ar =

Air Museum
- Museu do Ar
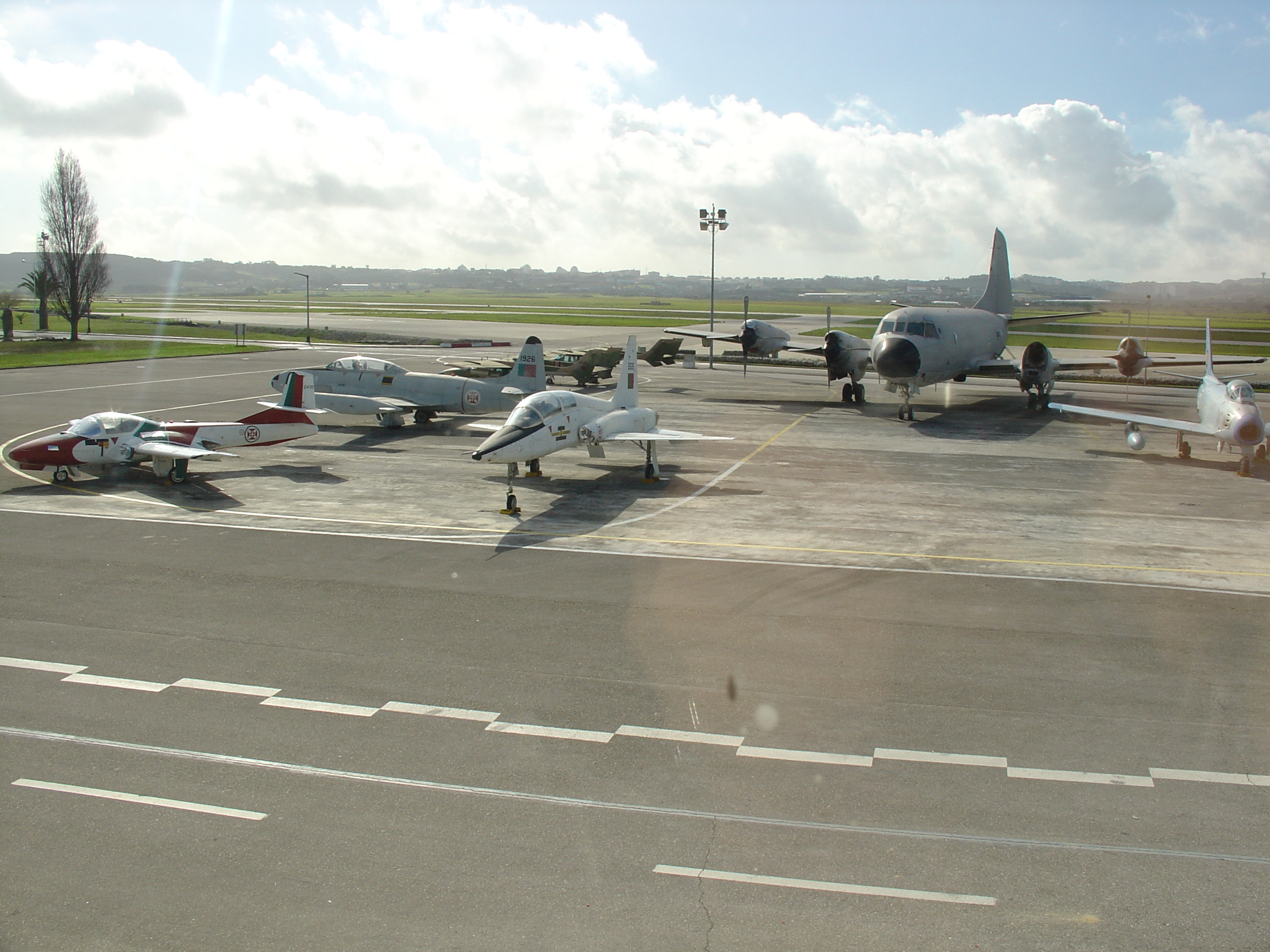
- Outdoor static park in Sintra
- Established: 1968
- Location: Sintra, Portugal
- Type: Aviation museum
- Director: Col. Rui Alberto Gomes Bento Roque
- Owner: Portuguese Air Force
- Website: www.emfa.pt/www/po/musar/

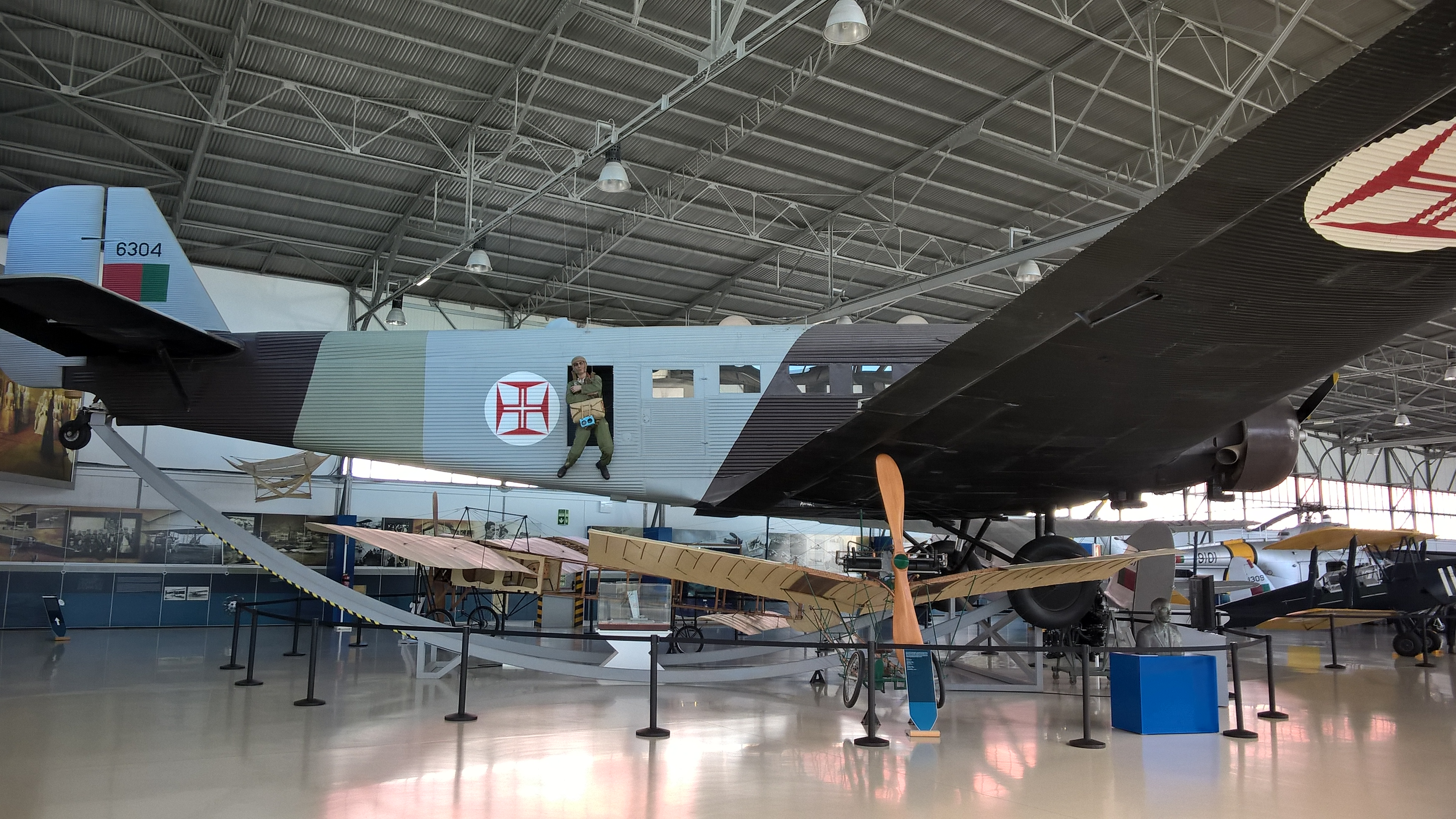
Junkers Ju 52 on display

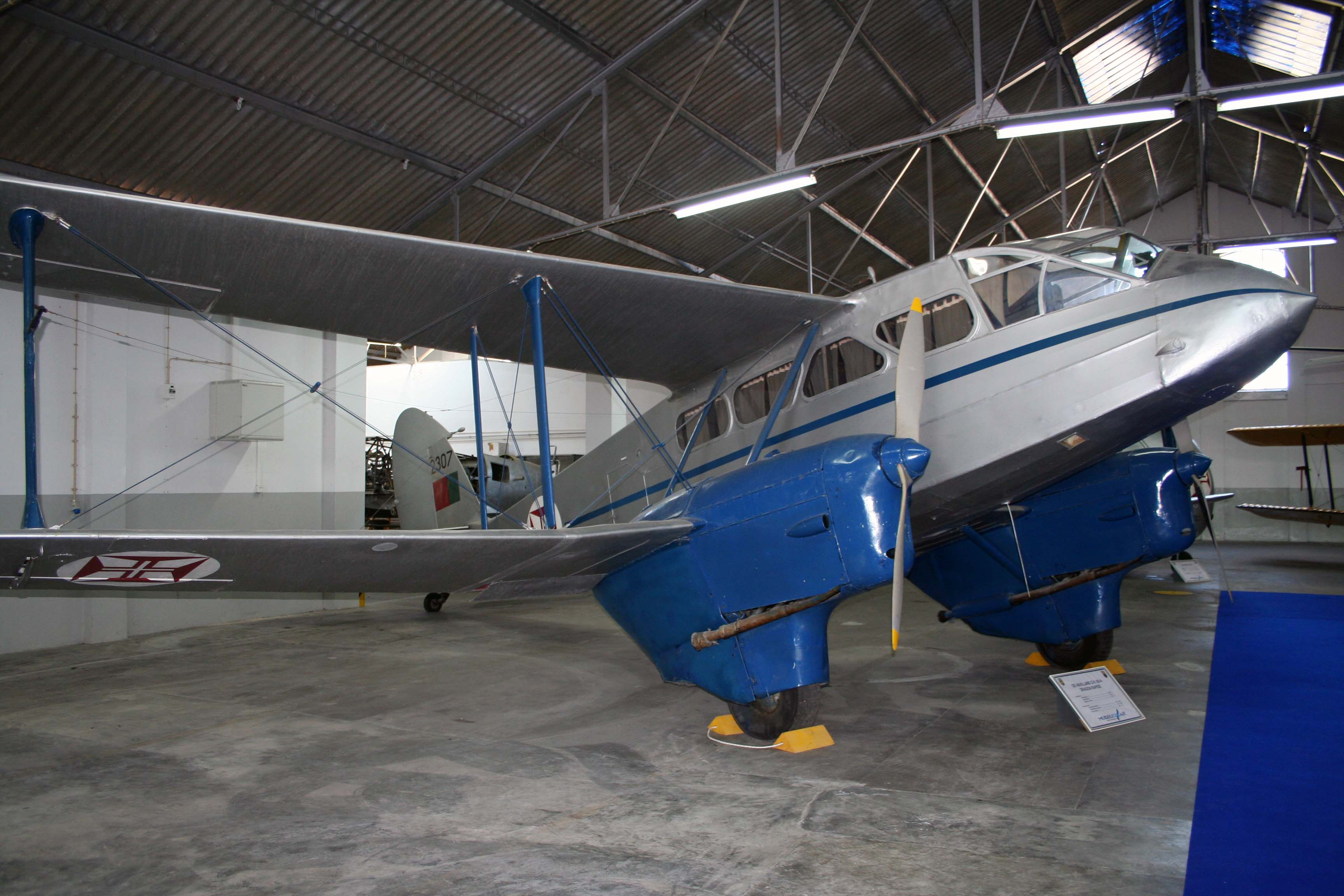
Dragon Rapide on display

The Air Museum (Portuguese: Museu do Ar) is an aviation museum of the Portuguese Air Force located at Sintra Air Base and with spaces at Ovar and Alverca.

== History ==
The museum dates back to the Aero Clube de Portugal in 1909 and was created in 1968 in a former Military Aviation hangar at Alverca. Opening for the first time to the public on July 1, 1971.

In 2009, due to the growth of the collection, a new site at the Sintra Air Base complex was created for the museum and part of the collection was transferred there.

== Aircraft on display ==
=== Sintra ===
- 14-bis
- Demoiselle XX
- de Havilland Hornet Moth (s/n CR-AAC/111)
- Blériot XI
- de Havilland DH89A Dragon Rapide (s/n 2307)
- Sikorsky UH-19 (s/n 9101)
- Beech AT-11 Kansan (s/n 2504)
- Supermarine Spitfire HF IXc (s/n ML255/MR-Z)
- North American F-86F Sabre (s/n 5320)
- North American F-86F Sabre (s/n 5361)
- Fiat G.91R/3 (s/n 5445)
- Fiat G.91R/4 (s/n 5407)
- Douglas C-47A Dakota (s/n 6157)
- Douglas C-47A Dakota (s/n CS-TDA)
- Dornier Do 27 A4 (s/n 3357)
- Dornier Do 27 A4 (s/n 3487)
- Jurca MJ2B Tempête
- Dassault/Dornier Alpha Jet A (s/n 15209)
- Dassault/Dornier Alpha Jet A (s/n 15224)
- Caudron G.III
- de Havilland DH-82A Tiger Moth (s/n 102)
- de Havilland DH-82A Tiger Moth (s/n 111)
- de Havilland Chipmunk Mk.20 (s/n 1305)
- CASA C-212-100 (s/n 16508)
- CASA C-212-100 (s/n 16524)
- Cessna T-37C (s/n 2420)
- Cessna T-37C (gate guard) (s/n 2424)
- Cessna T-37C (s/n 2430)
- Lockheed P-2V-5 Neptune (s/n 4711)
- Lockheed RT-33A T-Bird (s/n 1916)
- Lockheed T-33A Silver Star (s/n 1923)
- Lockheed T-33A Silver Star (s/n 1926)
- Northrop T-38A Talon (s/n 2605)
- Sud Aviation SE3130 Alouette II (s/n 9217)
- Sud Aviation SE3160 Alouette III (s/n 19384)
- Avro 631 Cadet
- North American AT-16 Harvard III (s/n 1517)
- North American T-6J Texan (s/n 1737)
- Aerospatiale SA330S-1 Puma (s/n 19512)
- Beechcraft F33A Bonanza (s/n CS-A7L)
- Boeing 707-382B (cockpit) (s/n 9T-MSS)
- Junkers Ju 52/3m g3e (s/n 6304)
- Nord N2502A Noratlas (s/n 6403)
- Cessna Skymaster FTB-337G (s/n 13701)
- Lockheed P-3P Orion (s/n 14806)
- Max Holste M.H.1521 Broussard (s/n 3304)
- Piper PA-18 (L-21B) Super Cub (s/n 3218)

=== Alverca ===
Sources:

- Auster D-5/160 (s/n 3564)
- De Havilland DHC-1 Chipmunk (s/n 1376)
- Fairey III D Mk.2 (s/n 17)
- Maurice Farman MF-4
- Grumman G-44 Widgeon (s/n 129)
- Grunau Baby (s/n CS-PAE)
- Hawker Hurricane IIIb
- Jodel D9 Bébé (s/n CS-AXA)
- North American F-86F Sabre (s/n 5319)
- North American T-6J Texan (s/n 1769)
- Northrop T-38A Talon (s/n 2601)
- Piper PA-18 (L-21B) Super Cub (s/n 3212)
- Cessna Skymaster FTB-337G (s/n 13709)
- LTV A-7P Corsair II (s/n 15508)
- Nikus Miniplane
- Hawker Hurricane IIc (s/n 591/RV-J) (not visible in visit on 30 Jan 2023)
- Cessna T-37C Tweety Bird (s/n 2420)
- Nord N2501 Noratlas (s/n 6420) (not visible in visit on 30 Jan 2023)
- Douglas C-54A Skymaster (s/n 6606) (possibly in external storage on main FAP base, 30 Jan 2023)
- Sud Aviation SE3130 Alouette II (s/n 9216)
- Sud Aviation SE3160 Alouette III (s/n 9258 main cabin, composite with s/n 9265 boom)

=== Ovar ===
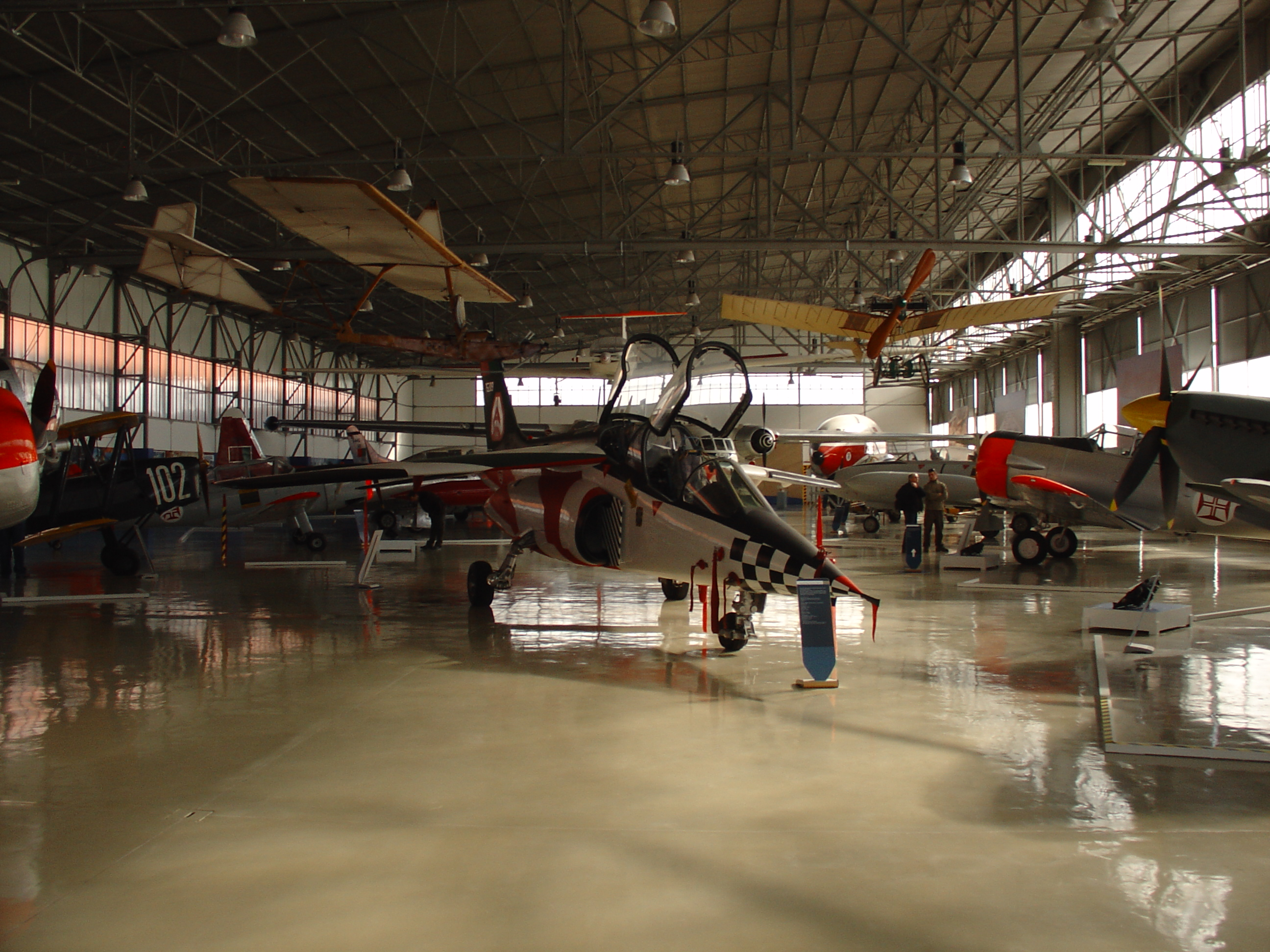
Apha Jet and other aircraft

- Auster D-5/160 (s/n 3208)
- CASA C-212-100
- Cessna T-37C (s/n 2427)
- Fiat G.91R/3 (s/n 5452)
- Northrop T-38A Talon (s/n 2603)
- Piper PA-18 (L-21B) Super Cub
- Cessna Skymaster FTB-337G
- Republic F-84G Thunderjet (s/n 5201)
- LTV TA-7P Corsair II (s/n 15550)

=== Stored aircraft ===
- Mikoyan-Gurevich MiG-21PFM Fishbed (s/n 6614), transferred from the Polish Aviation Museum
- Dassault Mirage IIIR (s/n 313)
- Canadair CF-104D Starfighter (s/n 104750)
- Max Holste MH-1521 Broussard (s/n 3301)
- Max Holste MH-1521 Broussard (s/n 3303)

== See also ==
- Portuguese Air Force
- OGMA
- List of aerospace museums
- List of aircraft of the Portuguese Air Force
- Royal Museum of the Armed Forces and of Military History
