= Turbomeca Aubisque =

1960s French turbofan engine

Aubisque / RM9
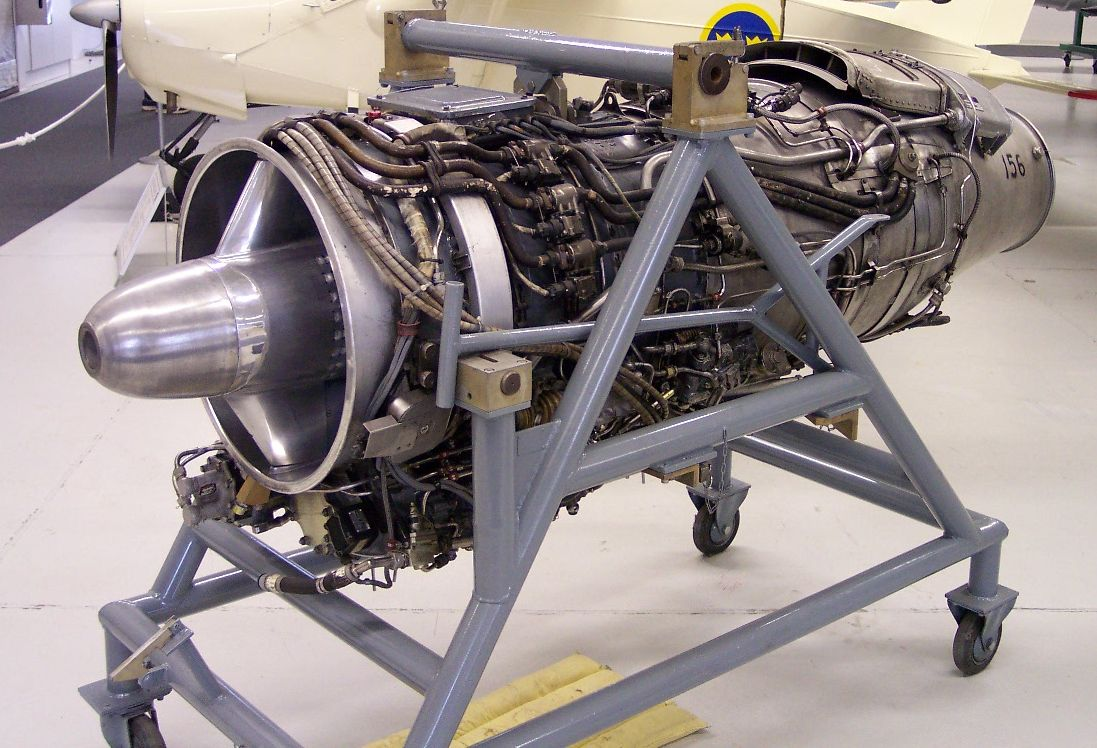
- Preserved Turbomeca Aubisque
- Type: Turbofan
- National origin: France
- Manufacturer: Turbomeca
- First run: 1961
- Major applications: Saab 105
- Developed from: Turbomeca Bastan

The Turbomeca Aubisque was a small turbofan engine designed and produced by Turbomeca in the 1960s. Its only application was the Saab 105 military trainer aircraft as the RM9. The engine is named after the Col d'Aubisque in the Pyrenees mountains, in line with company tradition.

The earlier Turbomeca Marboré turbojet was originally intended for the Saab 105, but when Saab needed more thrust than the Marboré produced, Turbomeca offered the Aubisque turbofan, a turbofan version of the Turbomeca Bastan turboprop. The Aubisque went into production for the Saab 105 and about 300 were produced, remaining in service for 30 years until replaced in the mid-1990s, by the Williams FJ44 turbofan, for surviving Swedish Air Force Saab 105s.

== Applications ==
- Saab 105

== Specifications (Aubisque 1A) ==
Data from Jane's All the World's Aircraft 1962-63, Aircraft engines of the World 1970

==== General characteristics ====
- Type: Low-bypass turbofan
- Length: 2,288 mm (90.1 in)
- Width: 650 mm (26 in)
- Height: 750 mm (30 in)
- Diameter: 564 mm (22.2 in) (casing)
- Dry weight: 285 kg (628 lb)

==== Components ====
- Compressor: Geared fan stage, single-stage axial, single-stage centrifugal
- Combustors: Annular combustion chamber
- Turbine: Two-stage axial
- Fuel type: Aviation Kerosene such as Jet A-1, JP-4 or JP-5
- Oil system: pressure spray at 4.6 bar (66 psi) with scavenge

==== Performance ====
- Maximum thrust: 7.3 kN (1,635 lbf) at 33,000 rpm (static)
- Max. continuous thrust: 6.13 kN (1,378 lbf) at 32,000 rpm (static)
- Overall pressure ratio: 6.9:1
- Air mass flow: 22.25 kg/s (49.1 lb/s)
- Turbine inlet temperature: JPT 843 K (570 °C)
- Fuel consumption: 420 kg/h (925.9 lb/h)
- Specific fuel consumption: 61 kg/kN/h (0.6 lb/lbf/h)
- Thrust-to-weight ratio: 6.3

== See also ==
Related development

- Turbomeca Bastan

Related lists

- List of aircraft engines
