= Nord 260 =

MH.260 Super Broussard Nord 260
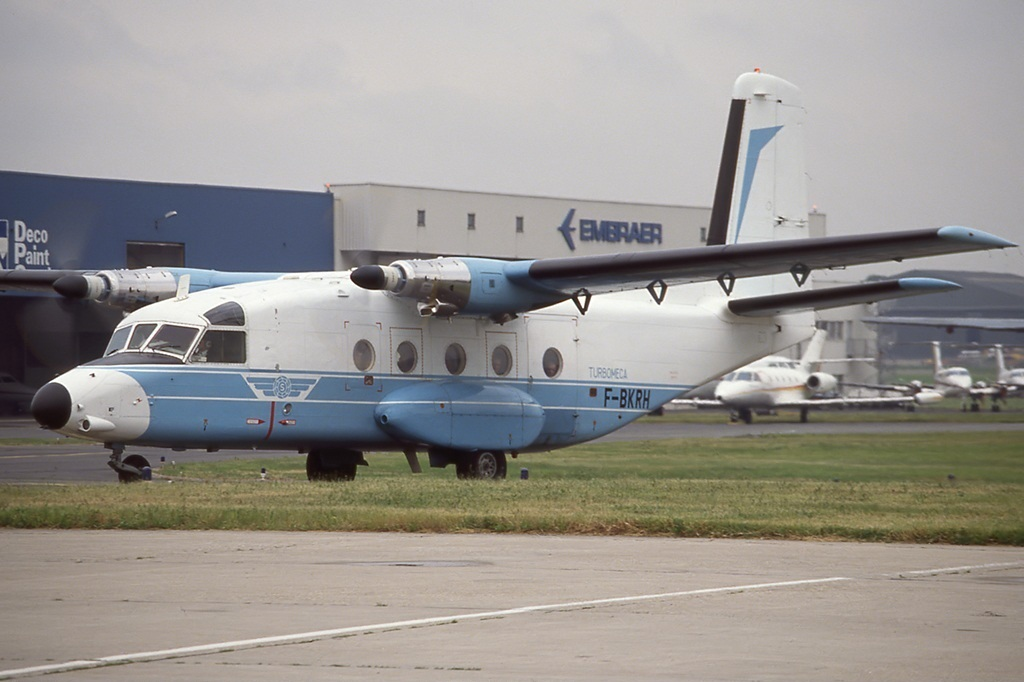
- Nord 260A.

General information
- Type: Passenger turboprop airliner
- National origin: France
- Manufacturer: Avions Max Holste / Nord Aviation
- Primary user: French Air Force
- Number built: 11 (1 × MH.250, 1 x MH-260 and 9 x Nord 260)

History
- First flight: 29 July 1960 (MH.260)
- Developed into: Aérospatiale N 262

The Nord 260, built in prototype form as the Max Holste MH.260 Super Broussard, ("Super Bushranger"), was a turboprop-powered, uprated version of the piston-engined Max Holste MH.250 Super Broussard, that was further developed into the Aérospatiale N 262.

== Design and development ==
In 1957, Avions Max Holste began work on a twin-engined follow on to its successful Broussard single-engined utility aircraft. The new aircraft, the Max Holste MH.250 Super Broussard, was a high-wing cantilever monoplane powered by two 600 hp (450 kW) Pratt & Whitney R-1340 radial engines and could accommodate 17–22 passengers. The sole MH-250 made its first flight on 20 May 1959.

Max-Holste developed the MH.250 into the turboprop-powered MH.260, to meet a perceived market for a replacement for the DC-3 and for feeder-liner services. Like the MH.250, the MH.260 was a high-wing aircraft with a square-section fuselage, which was of all-aluminum construction. The aircraft had a retractable tricycle undercarriage, with the main wheels retracting into fuselage-mounted fairings. Control surfaces were fabric covered. The MH.260 was 1.4 m (4 ft 7 in) longer than the MH.250, allowing 20–23 passengers to be carried, or up to 3,885 kg (8,565 lb) of cargo in place of passengers. The aircraft was powered by two Turbomeca Bastan engines.

The prototype MH.260, powered by two 730 shp (540 kW) Bastan IIIs, first flew on 29 July 1960. (Note: 27 July 1960 according to Chillon et al..) The prototype was re-engined with 986 shp (735 kW) Bastan IVs in October 1960. The construction of a batch of 10 MH.260s was started with a French government subsidy, and a collaboration arrangement agreed with Nord Aviation, but financial problems at Max Holste led to the programme being taken over by completely by Nord, with production aircraft known as Nord 260s. Only nine production Nord 260s were completed, with the tenth aircraft remaining unflown and used as a source of spare parts. Production was switched to the more advanced Nord 262 development.

== Operational history ==
Three Nord 260s were briefly operated under a lease agreement by the Norwegian airline Widerøe before being returned to Nord, while the French domestic airline Air Inter also evaluated the Nord 260. No commercial orders followed, however, although Air Inter later ordered the Nord 262. Five Nord 260s were delivered to the Centre d'essais en vol (CEV), the French flight test establishment, being used for experiments or as transports supporting the CEV's operations.

== Variants ==
MH.250 Super Broussard
Piston-engined light transport. One prototype built.
MH.260 Super Broussard
Turboprop powered derivative of MH.250, initially powered by Bastan III turboprop and later by more powerful Bastan IV engines. One built.
Nord MH.260
Ten Bastan IV-powered production aircraft were ordered by the French government, but only nine were completed.

== Operators ==
France
CEV
Norway
Widerøe - Three aircraft leased

== Specifications (Nord 260) ==
Data from MH-260 Super Broussard

General characteristics

- Crew: two
- Capacity: 23
- Length: 17.60 m (57 ft 9 in)
- Wingspan: 21.92 m (71 ft 11 in)
- Height: 6.58 m (21 ft 7 in)
- Wing area: 55.0 m^{2} (592 sq ft)
- Empty weight: 5,600 kg (12,345 lb)
- Gross weight: 9,400 kg (20,723 lb)
- Fuel capacity: 2,000 litres (440 imp gal; 530 US gal)
- Powerplant: 2 × Turbomeca Bastan IV Turboprop, 735 kW (985 hp) each
- Propellers: 3-bladed Ratier-Figeac

Performance

- Cruise speed: 380 km/h (236 mph, 205 kn)
- Stall speed: 90 km/h (56 mph, 49 kn)
- Range: 1,500 km (930 mi, 810 nmi)
- Service ceiling: 8,100 m (26,500 ft)
- Rate of climb: 8.5 m/s (1,670 ft/min)

== Bibliography ==
- Chillon, Jacques; Dubois, Jean-Pierre & Wegg, John (1980). French Post-War Transport Aircraft. Tonbridge, UK: Air-Britain. ISBN 0-85130-078-2.
- Stroud, John (1966). European Transport Aircraft since 1910. London: Putnam.
- Taylor, John W. R. (1961). Jane's All the World's Aircraft 1961–62. Sampson Low, Marston & Company, Ltd.
- Watkins, Peter W. (December 1961). "MH-260 Super Broussard". Flying. Vol. 69, no. 6. pp. 33, 89–91.
