= RACSA (airline) =

Guatemalan Airline

RACSA (Rutas Aéreas Centro Americanas)
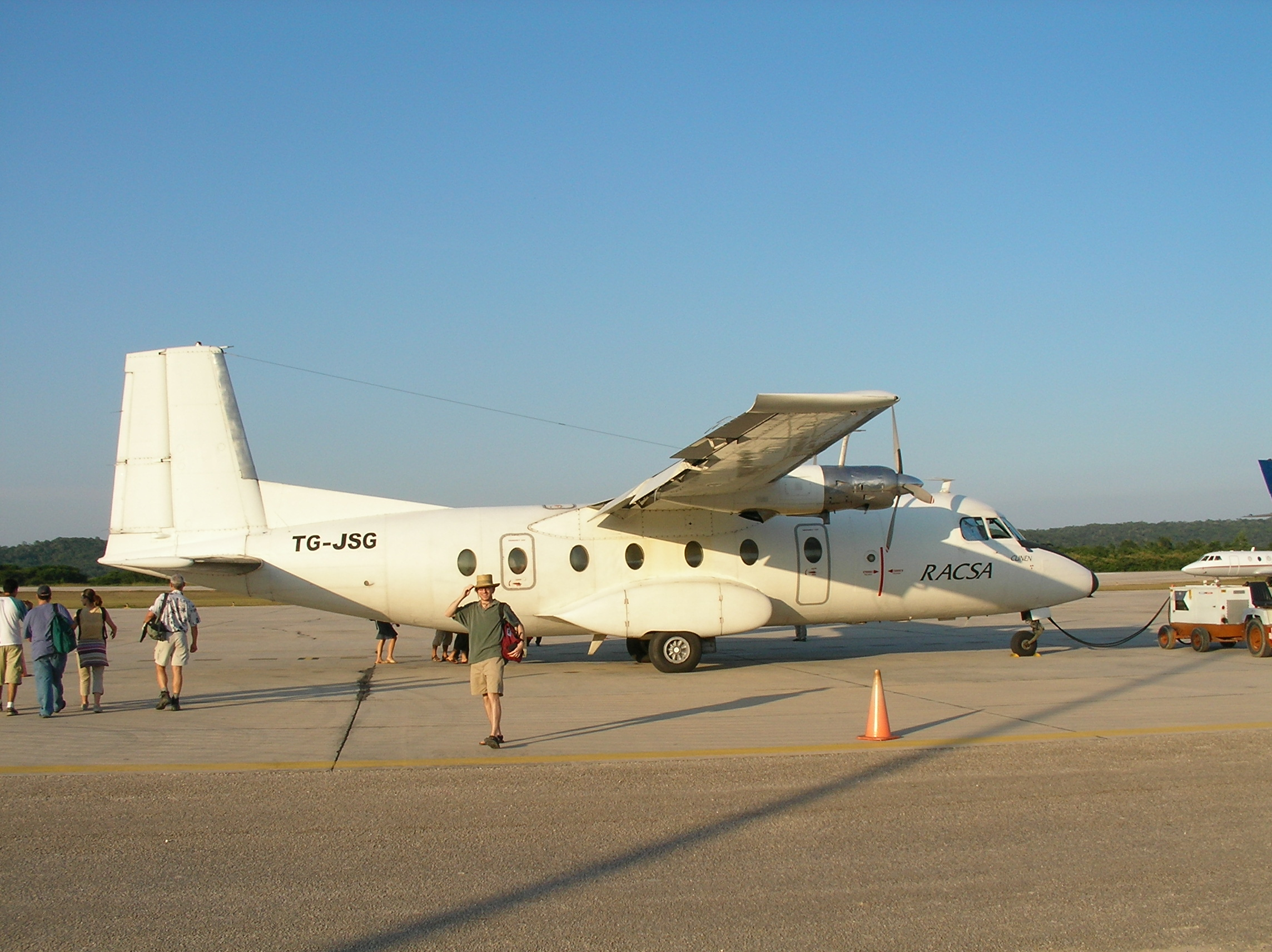
- RACSA Nord 262 in Guatemala, November 2004.
IATA	ICAO	Call sign
R6	-	Racsa
- Founded: 2001
- Ceased operations: 2009
- Operating bases: La Aurora International Airport
- Fleet size: 2 Aérospatiale N 262
- Headquarters: Guatemala City, Guatemala

RACSA was a private passenger and cargo airline based in Guatemala La Aurora International Airport. It mainly operates charter flights throughout the country. One of its planes was hired by the Guatemalan Air Force and temporarily based at Quetzaltenango Airport after Hurricane Stan in 2005, in order to provide help in remote areas. It is a member in the Association of Private Airlines of Guatemala. However, its current status (2008) is uncertain.

== Code data ==
- Call-sign: Racsa

== Fleet ==
The RACSA fleet included 2 Aérospatiale N 262, TG-JSG (named Cunén); TG-NTR (named Kaibil)

== Destinations ==
- Charter flights throughout the country
