= Max Holste MH.1521 Broussard =

1950s French six-seat utility monoplane

MH.1521 Broussard
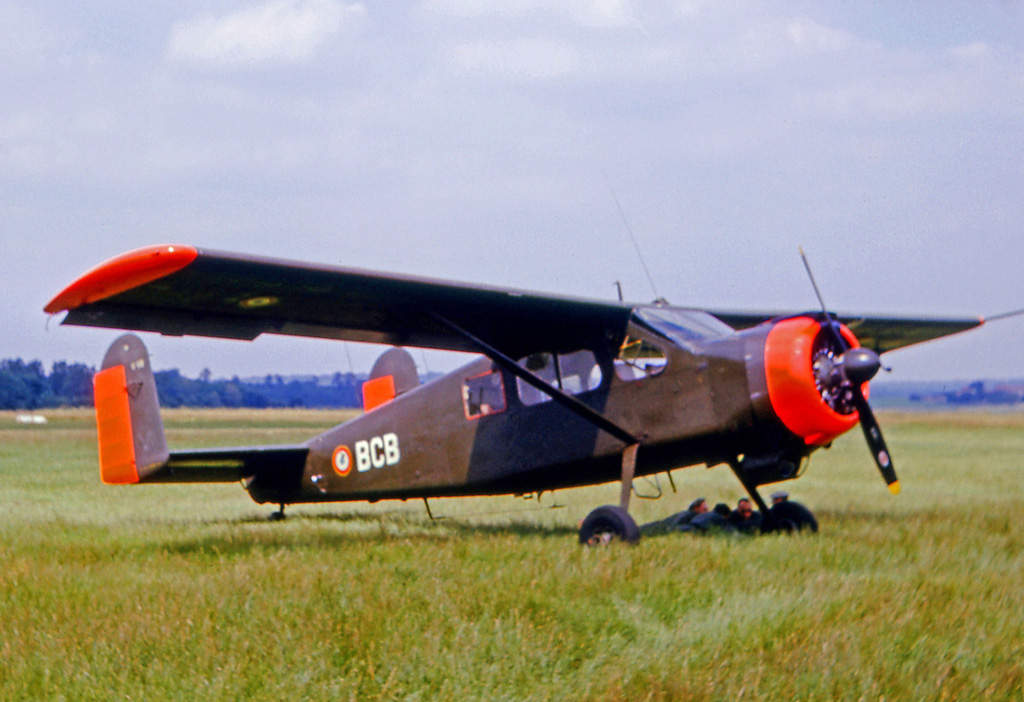
- Operational French Army MH.1521M Broussard at Toussus-le-Noble airfield in 1965

General information
- Type: Six-seat utility monoplane
- National origin: France
- Manufacturer: Avions Max Holste
- Primary user: French Army
- Number built: 396

History
- Introduction date: 1954
- First flight: 1952
- Retired: 1993 (French army)

The Max Holste MH.1521 Broussard is a 1950s French six-seat utility monoplane designed by Max Holste to meet a French Army requirement.

== Design and development ==
Following the end of the Second World War, Avions Max Holste designed and built a new two-seat trainer and tourer aircraft, the Max Holste MH.52, of which only small numbers were built. Holste then responded to a French Army requirement for an artillery spotter aircraft for a lightweight liaison and observation aircraft. The resulting design, the MH.152, had a fuselage based on that of the MH.52 and a high-mounted wing. It was powered by a 220 horsepower (160 kW) Salmson 8 As.04 engine and had an enclosed, fully-glazed cabin seating a pilot and four passengers. A prototype flew on 12 June 1951. While it demonstrated good short-field performance, the French Army's needs had changed, with it now requiring a robust utility aircraft similar to the de Havilland Canada DHC-2 Beaver.

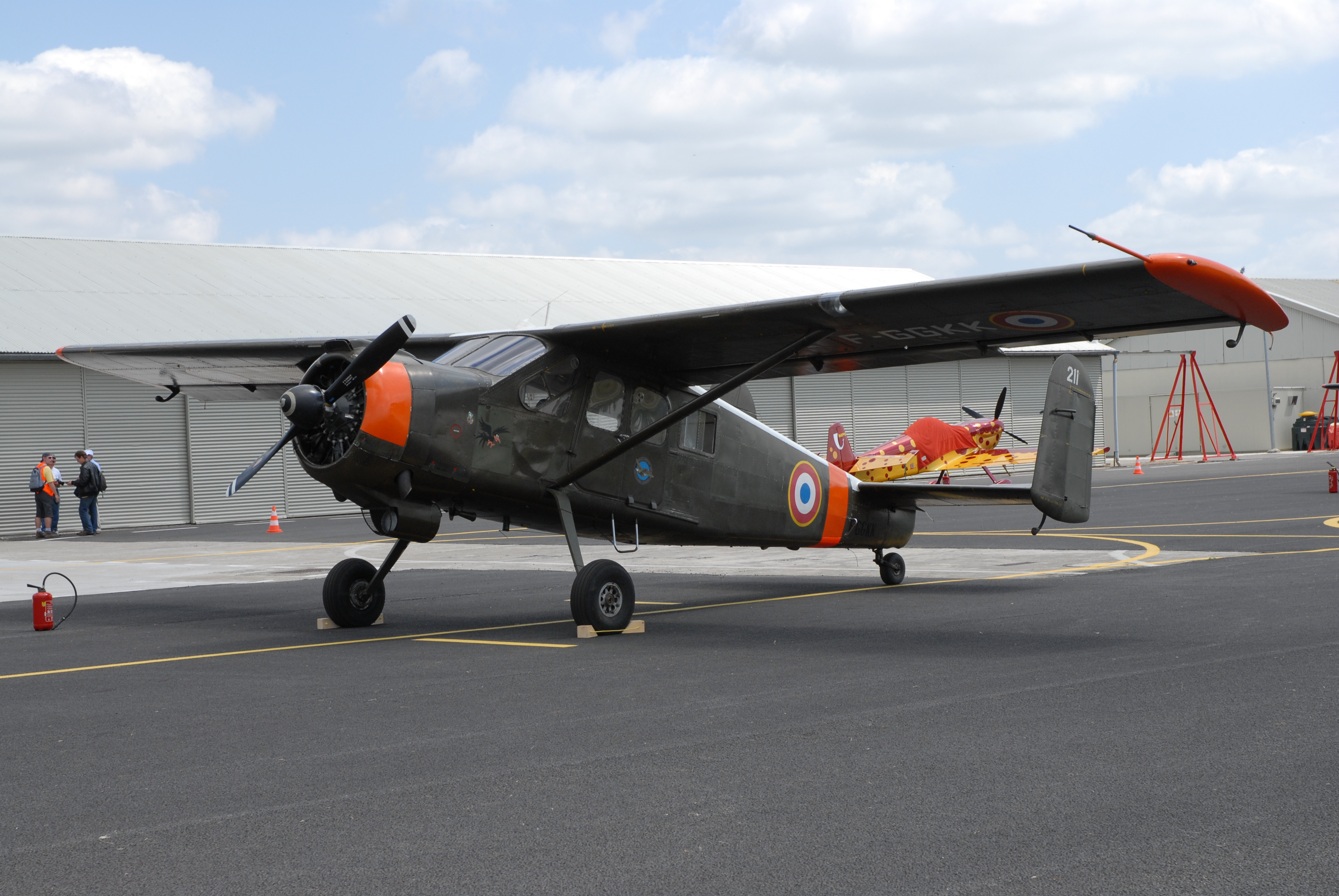
Preserved MH-1521 Broussard at AirExpo in 2007

As a result, the company decided to develop a slightly larger version, the MH.1521 with the engine changed to a Pratt and Whitney Wasp Junior, which at 450 horsepower (340 kW) provided almost twice as much power and a slab-sided fuselage giving room for up to seven seats. The MH.1521 is a braced high-wing monoplane with twin vertical tail surfaces. It has a fixed tailwheel landing gear and is powered by a nose-mounted Pratt & Whitney R-985 radial piston engine. It first flew on 17 November 1952. It was later named the Broussard (lit. Man of the Bush, in the context of bush pilots rather than Bushmen). Its development was enthusiastically supported at a political level by WWII fighter ace and French war hero Pierre Clostermann, a close friend of Max Holste. Clostermann wrote a faction novel, "Leo 25 Airborne", based on his experiences flying Broussards with Escadrille ELO 3/45 in Algeria.

The first production aircraft made its maiden flight on 16 June 1954, and 363 were built before production ended in 1961. Its similarity to the de Havilland Canada DHC-2 Beaver in looks, capability and performance led it to be nicknamed "the French Beaver".

== Operational history ==
It saw service in the Algerian War as an Army cooperation aircraft, with more than 150 deployed, mostly as an artillery spotter and in an air supply/ambulance role, where its good short-field performance and resistance to ground fire were required. Its distinctive sound, made by its noisy radial engine and large propeller, was a disadvantage as the Algerian guerrillas could hear its approach long before other aircraft.

Following Algerian independence in 1963, the Algeria-based Broussards returned to France, where they were used for liaison aircraft, while many of France's surplus Broussards were transferred to newly independent ex-French colonies. The Broussard remained in service with the French Air Force until December 1987, and with the French Army until December 1993, while the French Navy retired its last examples in 1996. Civil-owned Broussards can still be seen in Denmark, France, the UK, and the United States being operated by enthusiasts or collectors.

It saw combat on Portuguese Guinea for the Portuguese Air Force as well during the independence war acting mostly as an artillery spotter and in an air supply/ambulance role also as observation plane, it was retired during the 60's when the newer Do-27 became available.

== Variants ==
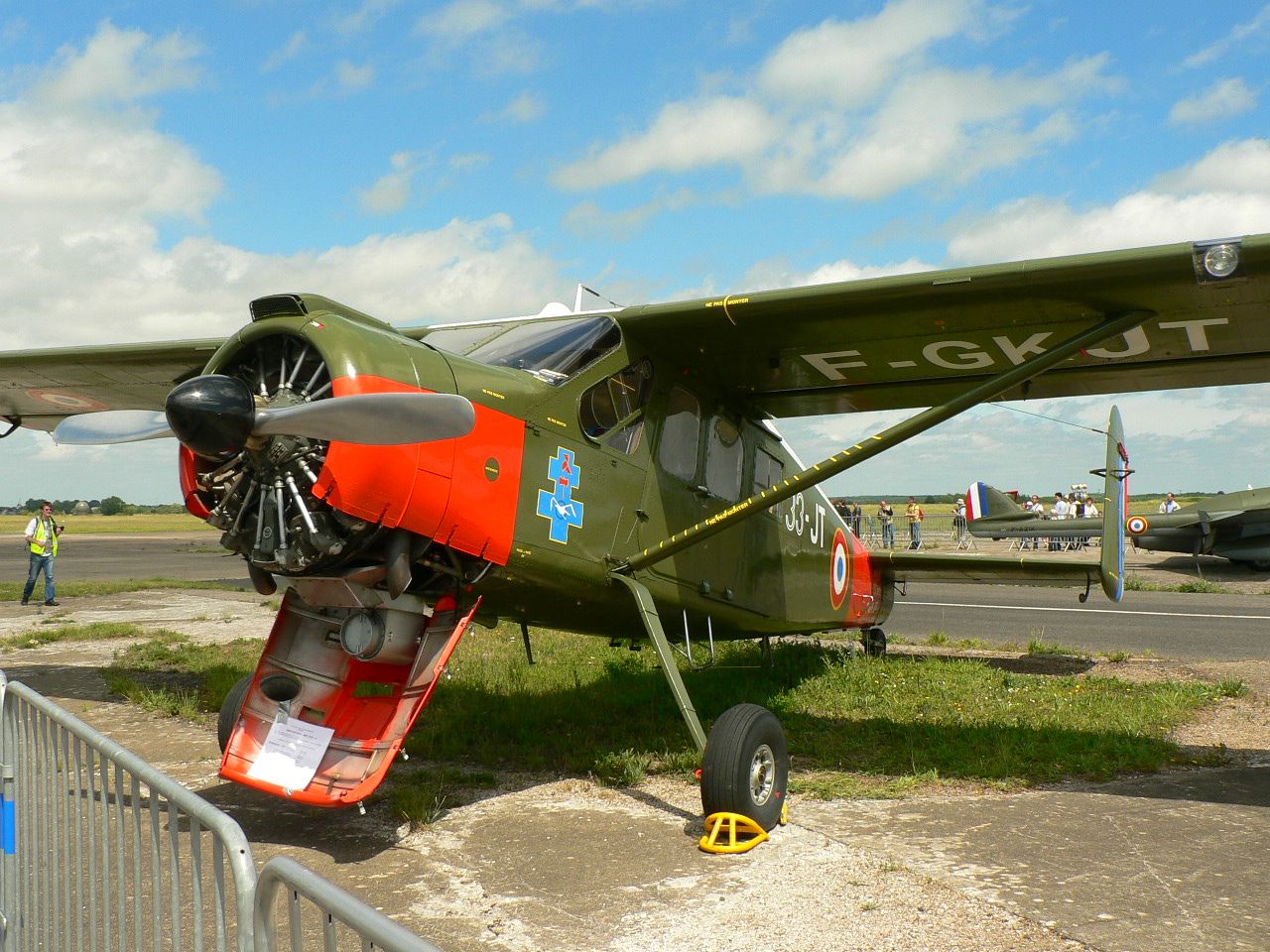

MH.152
First prototype of the Broussard series, powered by a Salmson 8 As.04 inverted V-8 engine.
MH.1521
Prototypes, five built plus two pre-production aircraft and 19 pre-production military variants.
MH.1521A
Aircraft modified for agricultural use.
MH.1521C
Production for civil or non-French military customers, 36 built.
MH.1521M
Production for French military, 319 built.
MH.1522
Based on MH.1521, with full span leading-edge slats and double-slotted trailing edge flaps to improve stall performance. Prototype, modified from a pre-production aircraft, flown on 11 February 1958, but later converted back to MH.1521 standard.
MH.153
The prototype MH.152 powered by a Turbomeca Astazou turboprop engine. First flew in this form June 1957.

== Operators ==
=== Military operators ===
Argentina

- Argentine Air Force
- Argentine National Gendarmerie

Benin

- Benin Air Force

Cambodia

- Royal Cambodian Air Force

Cameroon

- Cameroon Air Force

Central African Republic

- Central African Republic Air Force

Chad

- Chad Air Force

France

- French Air Force
- French Army
- French Naval Aviation

Ivory Coast

- Cote d'Ivoire Air Force

Djibouti

- Force Aérienne du Djibouti

Gabon

- Gabonese Air Force

Madagascar

- Malagasy Air Force

Mali

- Malian Air Force

Mauritania

- Mauritania Islamic Air Force

Morocco

- Royal Moroccan Air Force

Niger

- Niger Air Force

Portugal

- Portuguese Air Force

Senegal

- Senegalese Air Force

Togo

- Armée de l'Air Togolaise

Upper Volta

- Force Aérienne de Haute-Volta

=== Civil operators ===
France

- Securite Civile

== Surviving aircraft ==
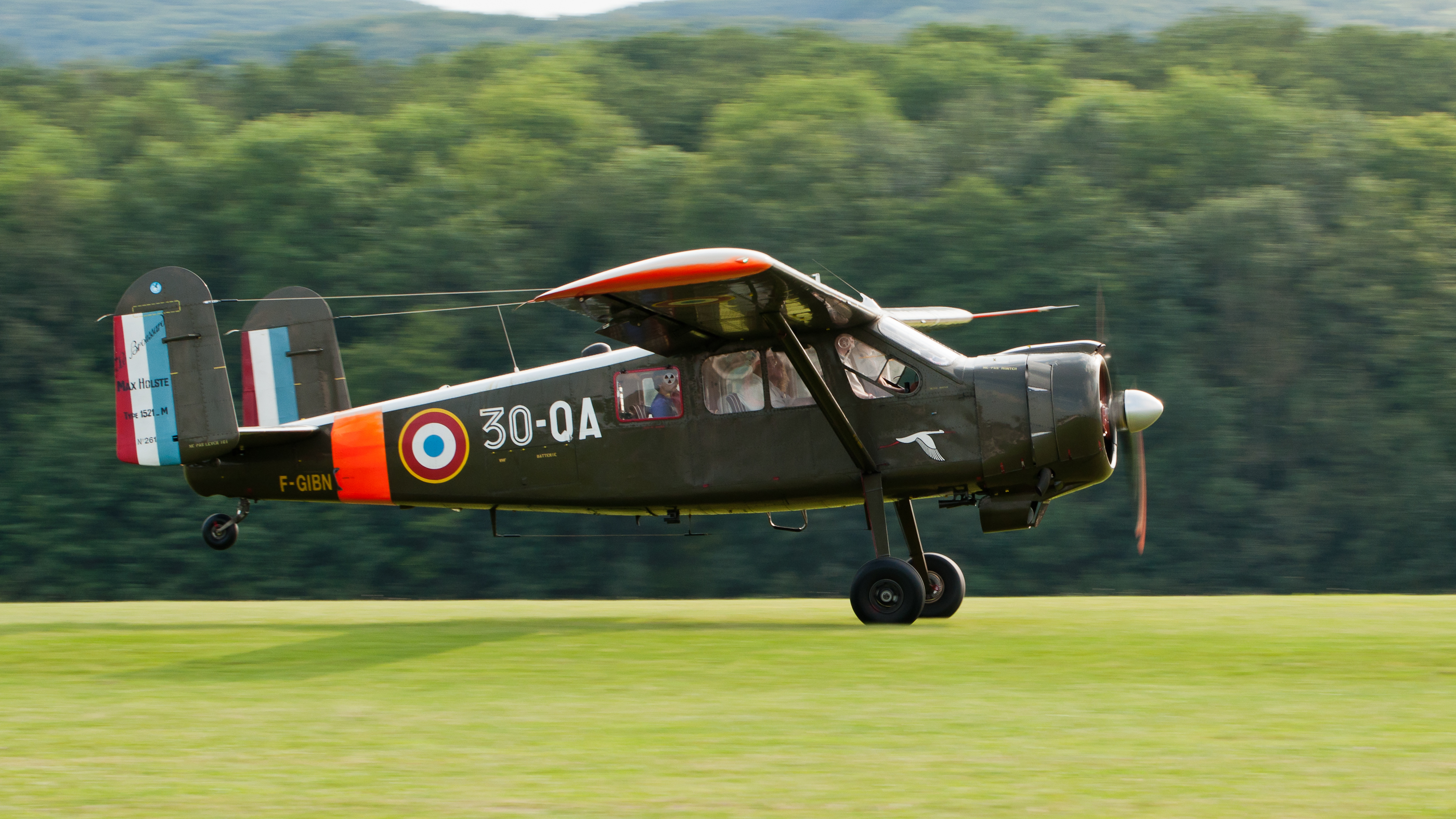
MH-1521M Broussard F-GIBN flying at Oldtimer Fliegertreffen Hahnweide in 2013.

- CEV-05 (s/n 05) oldest existing MH-1521, previously preserved at Melun, France, exported to Canada. Now in the UK as G-CLLK.
- N98BF (s/n P007) is located in Pekin, IL, USA. Currently flying
- N345ZB (s/n P010, originally call sign ZB of ELO 3/45) flying in Orange, MA, USA.
- N811MH (s/n 011) is located in Elbert, Colorado.
- Unknown (s/n 163) is located at the Kalamazoo Air Zoo in Kalamazoo Michigan. On outdoor display marked as 13-TB.
- F-RHDB (s/n 015) stored in private terrain, previously preserved at the Aviation Museum in Mas Palegry, France.
- F-GIBF (s/n 5) on display at Orange Air Base Museum, Orange, France.
- HB-RSL (s/n 6) was stationed in Biel-Kappelen, Switzerland and in flying condition but was destroyed in a hangar fire on July 3, 2016.
- F-BOHP (s/n 10) is located in Lunéville, France.
- F-SCAA (s/n 11) is stored at Bordeaux, France.
- F-GJBF (s/n 13) is located in Reims, France, this aircraft was used for filming Belle and Sebastian 2 (2015).
- F-RHDA (s/n 18) stored at the Musée de l'Air et de l'Espace in Le Bourget, France.
- G-CBGL (s/n 19) is located at Bruntingthorpe, United Kingdom.
- LV-X769 (s/n 20) is registered as an experimental aircraft in Argentina. It's in flying conditions as of March 2024.
- PG-336 (s/n 24C) preserved at the Museo Nacional de Aeronáutica in Morón, Buenos Aires, Argentina.
- N4022 (s/n 22) US FAA registered to a German company but parked at Hollister, California as of Nov 2024.
- F-SCCB (s/n 24) previously preserved as gate guard at Valence, France, dismantled & offered for sale as restoration project.
- F-GGKH (s/n 32) is located in Pithiviers, France.
- F-GJLT (s/n 44C) Restoration work had begun but was halted because the fuselage was in such poor condition that it is now on display to the public during open days in Limoges (Town), France.
- F-GFMN (s/n 86) is located in Limoges (Airport), France.
- F-GHFG (s/n 104) is located in Montceau-les-Mines, France.
- F-GKJT (s/n 106) is located in Maconge, France.
- F-BNEX (s/n 108) is located at Lelystad, Netherlands with French registration.
- N118MH (s/n 118) is registered in Caldwell, Idaho, USA in flying condition.
- F-GGGK (s/n 127) under restoration in Lituania.
- G-HOUR (s/n 149) Owned by Bremont, United Kingdom.
- G-TNUP (s/n 154) flies from Headcorn Aerodrome, United Kingdom.
- F-UHKE (s/n 156), stored in private terrain in France, previously preserved at Noyant, France as gate guardian.
- G-YYYY (s/n 208) flies from Eggesford, UK in 2010.
- N246MH 1960 (s/n 246) is located in Friendswood, Texas, USA and in flying condition.
- N261BN (s/n 261) is located in Lake Stevens, Washington, USA in flying condition.
- F-GJJM (s/n 292) is located at Brasschaat, Belgium with markings 35.17 and is for sale as of August 2025.
- OY-SLV (s/n 303) is located in Tarm, Denmark and in flying condition.
- 3301 (s/n 51C). Bought by Portuguese Air Force in 1960, delivered in March or April 1961, withdrawn from service in 1976. Preserved, donated to the Portuguese National Aviation Museum, where it remains in storage.
- 3302 (s/n 52C). Bought by Portuguese Air Force in 1960, delivered in March or April 1961, withdrawn from service in 1976. Preserved, donated to the Portuguese National Aviation Museum, where it remains in storage.
- 3303 (s/n 53C). Bought by Portuguese Air Force in 1960, delivered in March or April 1961, withdrawn from service in 1976. Destination unknown. Probably destroyed in an accident or dismantled.
- 3304 (s/n 54C). Bought by Portuguese Air Force in 1960, delivered in March or April 1961, withdrawn from service in 1976. Preserved and donated to the Portuguese National Aviation Museum, where it remains on display at the museum's Sintra branch.

== Specifications (MH.1521M) ==
Data from Jane's All the World's Aircraft 1958-59

General characteristics

- Crew: 1-2
- Capacity: 4-5 passengers
- Length: 8.65 m (28 ft 5 in)
- Wingspan: 13.75 m (45 ft 1 in)
- Height: 3.67 m (12 ft 0 in)
- Wing area: 25.2 m^{2} (271 sq ft)
- Aspect ratio: 7.5
- Airfoil: NACA 4413
- Empty weight: 1,650 kg (3,638 lb) equipped
- Gross weight: 2,700 kg (5,952 lb)
- Powerplant: 1 × Pratt & Whitney R-985-AN-1 9-cylinder air-cooled radial piston engine, 336 kW (451 hp)
- Propellers: 2-bladed Hamilton Standard 2.D.30 constant-speed propeller

Performance

- Maximum speed: 259 km/h (161 mph, 140 kn) at 1,000 m (3,300 ft)
- Cruise speed: 228 km/h (142 mph, 123 kn)
- Stall speed: 92.6 km/h (57.5 mph, 50.0 kn)
- Rate of climb: 3.99 m/s (785 ft/min) at sea level
- Take-off run: 200 m (660 ft)
- Take-off distance to 20 m (66 ft): 400 m (1,300 ft)
- Landing distance from 20 m (66 ft): 400 m (1,300 ft)

== See also ==
Aircraft of comparable role, configuration, and era

- De Havilland Canada Beaver
