= Max Holste MH.52 =

1940s French light aircraft

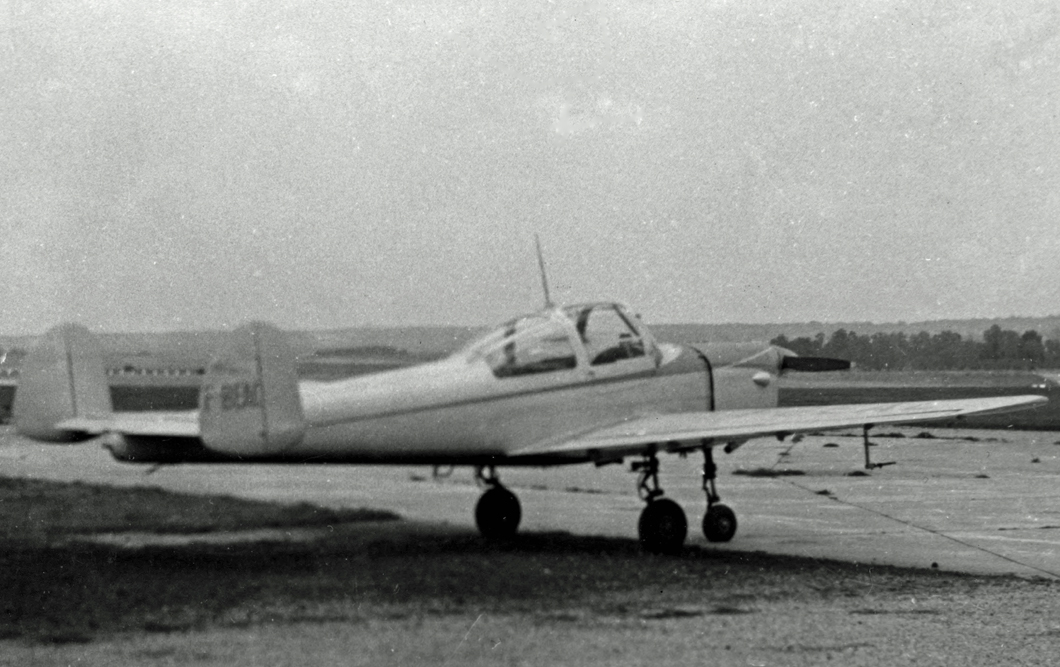
- Max Holste MH.52G at St Cyr l'Ecole airfield near Paris in May 1957

General information
- Type: two-seat Touring/training monoplane
- Manufacturer: Avions Max Holste
- Status: 2 still extant in 2006
- Primary users: aero clubs private pilots
- Number built: 13

History
- First flight: 21 August 1945

The Max Holste MH.52 was a 1940s French-built two-seat touring or training monoplane designed and constructed by Avions Max Holste.

== Development and construction ==
Developed in the mid-1940s, the MH.52 was a low-wing cantilever monoplane with twin fins and rudders and a fixed tricycle landing gear. It had a cockpit with side-by-side seating for the pilot and trainee or passenger. The canopy was framed with forward-opening transparent sliding doors. The prototype first flew on 21 August 1945. The aircraft was powered by a variety of inline engines developing between 95 and 150 hp (71 to 112 kW).

A development of the MH.52 was the sole MH.53 Cadet which had a fixed tailwheel landing gear and a lower powered 135 hp (101 kW) de Havilland Gipsy Major 10 engine.

== Operational history ==
A total of 13 production aircraft were built by the end of the 1940s. Most were flown by aero clubs and private pilots in France, but three examples were delivered to Egypt.

== Surviving aircraft ==
Two MH.52s survived in the 2000s. No.4 is awaiting restoration to fly at an airfield near Paris. No.11 is privately stored by a group located at an airfield near Bergerac.

== Variants ==
Source: The Aircraft of the World.

MH.52M
initial model with tricycle landing gear powered by a Renault 4P engine of 140 hp (104 kW). Later changed to a Potez 4D engine of 150 hp (112 kW) (2 built)
MH.52G
MH.52M with de Havilland Gipsy Major 1 engine of 120 hp (89 kW) (6 built)
MH.52R
MH.52G with Renault 4P-01 engine of 140 hp (104 kW) (4 built)
MH.53
Tailwheel landing gear version of the MH.52G powered by a de Havilland Gipsy Major 10 engine. (1 built)

== Specifications (MH.52) ==
Data from The Illustrated Encyclopedia of Aircraft (Part Work 1982-1985), 1985, Orbis Publishing, Page 2435/6

General characteristics

- Crew: 2
- Length: 7.25 m (23 ft 9 in)
- Wingspan: 9.80 m (32 ft 1.75 in)
- Height: 2.18 m (7 ft 1.75 in)
- Wing area: 14 m^{2} (150.7 sq ft)
- Empty weight: 640 kg (1,411 lb)
- Gross weight: 870 kg (1,918 lb)
- Powerplant: 1 × Potez 4D inline piston engine , 112 kW (150 hp)

Performance

- Maximum speed: 230 km/h (143 mph, 124 kn)
- Range: 600 km (373 mi, 324 nmi)

== See also ==
Aircraft of comparable role, configuration, and era

- ERCO Ercoupe
