= Dassault Communauté =

1950s French prototype turboprop aircraft

MD.415 Communauté
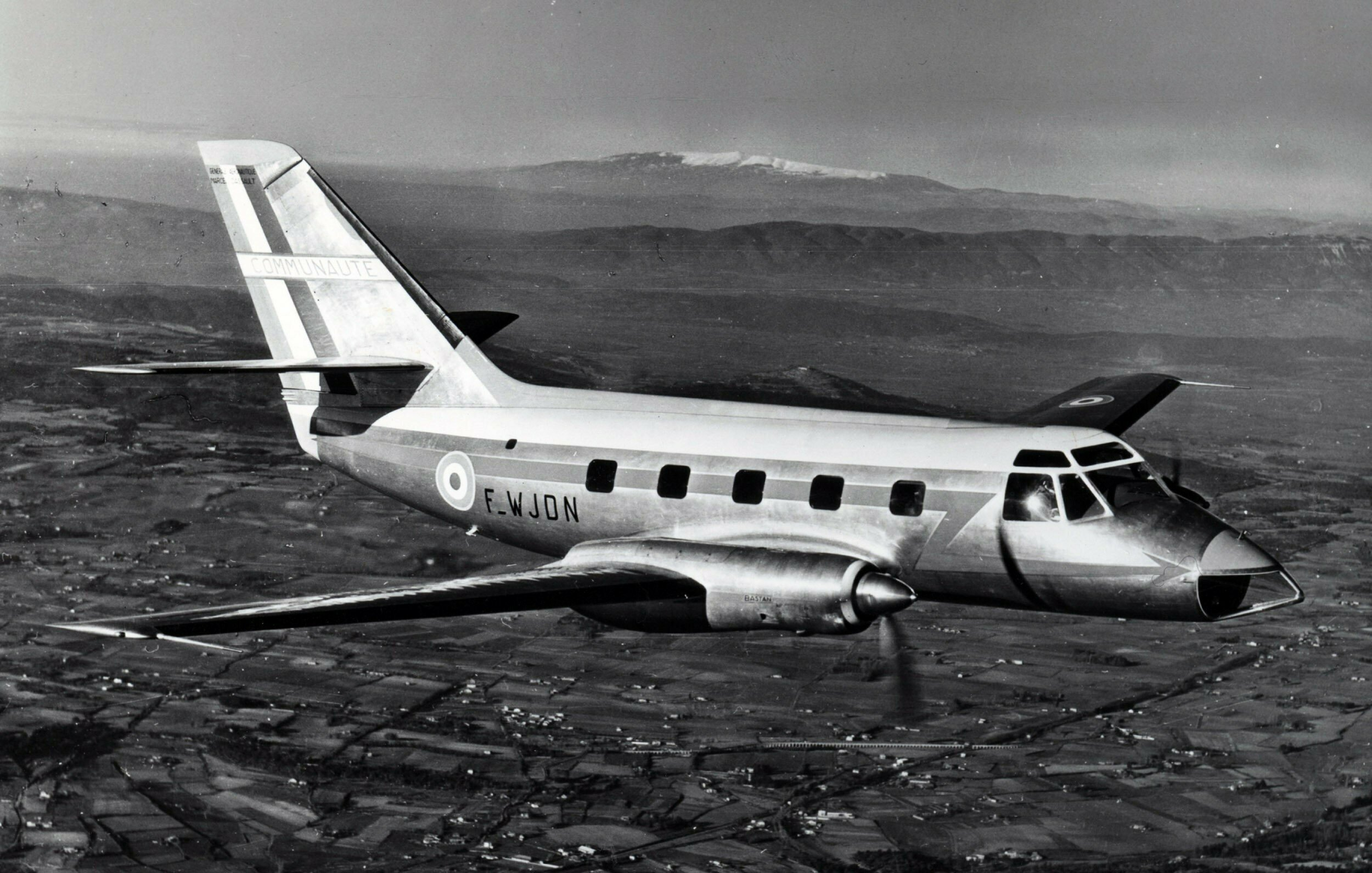

General information
- Type: Light turboprop civil transport
- Manufacturer: Dassault Aviation
- Number built: 1

History
- First flight: 10 May 1959

The Dassault MD.415 Communauté was a 1950s French twin-engined light turboprop transport monoplane built by Dassault Aviation. Only one prototype was built and flown.

== Development ==
The Dassault company designed a light transport aircraft in the late 1950s, designated MD.415 and later named Communauté, as a potential replacement for the Dassault MD 315 Flamant in its trainer, command transport or ambulance aircraft roles. The Communauté was a cantilever low-wing monoplane with retractable tricycle landing gear with room for two crew and up to ten passengers. Powered by two wing-mounted Turbomeca Bastan turboprops, the prototype (F-WJDN) first flew on 10 May 1959.

The company also developed a military version designated the MD.410 Spirale. Retaining 90% commonality with the Communauté, the Spirale had all the windows removed and transparent nose panels added. It also had provision for cannon or machine-gun armament and was fitted with under-wing hardpoints for weapons. It was intended that the Spirale could be used for close-support, reconnaissance or transport roles.

Neither the Communauté nor the Spirale received any production orders and a high-wing development designated Spirale III was also abandoned.

== Variants ==
MD.410 Spirale
Prototype military version, one built, powered by two Turbomeca Astazou XIVD engines.
MD.415 Communauté
Prototype light transport, one built.
MD.415 Communauté A1
A proposed joint development from Dassault and Sud-Aviation for a new version of the MD 415, a liaison aircraft carrying eight passengers over 2,400 km (1,500 mi; 1,300 nmi) or a feeder-liner carrying 21 passengers over 500 km (310 mi; 270 nmi).
MD.415 Communauté A2
Proposed 14-seat variant.
MD.415M Diplomate
A proposed scaled-up executive transport variant.
MD.455 Spirale III
Proposed high-wing transport version, not built.

== Specifications (MD-415 Communauté) ==
Data from

General characteristics

- Crew: two
- Capacity: six-ten passengers or 2,200 kg (4,900 lb) payload (14 pax in the proposed Communauté A2)
- Length: 13 m (42 ft 8 in)
- Wingspan: 16.43 m (53 ft 11 in)
- Wing area: 36 m^{2} (390 sq ft)
- Empty weight: 3,610 kg (7,959 lb)
- Max takeoff weight: 5,900 kg (13,007 lb)
- Powerplant: 2 × Turbomeca Bastan IV , 750 kW (1,000 hp) each + 0.647 kN (145 lbf) residual thrust

Performance

- Maximum speed: 500 km/h (310 mph, 270 kn) at 6,000 m (20,000 ft)
- Cruise speed: 450 km/h (280 mph, 240 kn) at 6,000 m (20,000 ft)
- Range: 2,500 km (1,600 mi, 1,300 nmi)
- Ferry range: 3,200 km (2,000 mi, 1,700 nmi) with external tanks
- Service ceiling: 11,000 m (36,000 ft)
- Takeoff run: 380 m (1,250 ft)

== Bibliography ==
- Chillon, Jacques; Dubois, Jean-Pierre & Wegg, John (1980). French Post-War Transport Aircraft. Tonbridge, UK: Air-Britain. ISBN 0-85130-078-2.
- Cuny, Jean (1989). Les avions de combat français, 2: Chasse lourde, bombardement, assaut, exploration [French Combat Aircraft 2: Heavy Fighters, Bombers, Attack, Reconnaissance]. Docavia (in French). Vol. 30. Ed. Larivière. OCLC 36836833.
- "Flying Newsreel: Paris Air Show". Flying. Vol. 69, no. 2. August 1961. pp. 48–50.
- Lemaire, René (November 1986). "Les Dassault "Commmunauté" et "Spirale"". Le Fana de l'Aviation (in French). No. 204. pp. 20–23.
- Lemaire, René (December 1986). "Les Dassault "Commmunauté" et "Spirale" (Seconde partie)". Le Fana de l'Aviation (in French). No. 205. pp. 13–17.
- Lemaire, René (January 1987). "Les Dassault "Commmunauté" et "Spirale" (3^{e} partie)". Le Fana de l'Aviation (in French). No. 206. pp. 22–26.
- Lemaire, René (February 1987). "Les Dassault "Commmunauté" et "Spirale" (Quatrième et derniè partie)". Le Fana de l'Aviation (in French). No. 207. pp. 22–17.
- Taylor, John W.R. (1962). Jane's All the World's Aircraft 1962-63. London: Sampson Low, Marston & Co.
- The Illustrated Encyclopaedia of Aircraft. London: Orbis Publications. 1982–1985.
- "MD 415 Communauté". Dassault.
