= Air Atlantique =

Airline in the United Kingdom

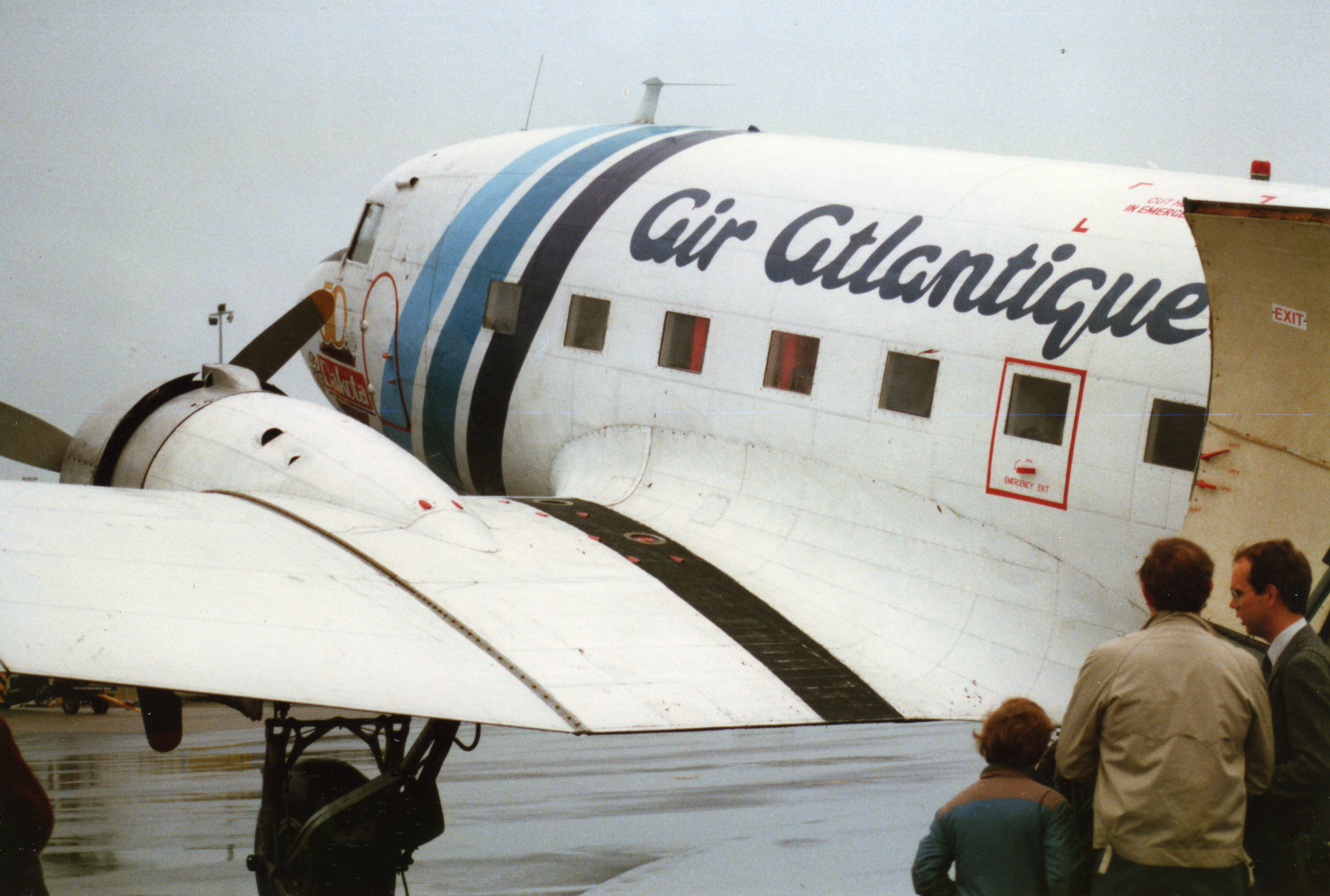
IATA	ICAO	Call sign
7M	AAG	ATLANTIC
- Founded: 1969
- Ceased operations: 2008
- Parent company: Air Atlantique Group
- Headquarters: Coventry, United Kingdom
- Key people: Mike Collett

Air Atlantique was an airline based at Coventry Airport operating a number of classic aircraft, both for passenger operation and for cargo transportation. They operated a large fleet of Douglas DC-3 aircraft alongside several Douglas DC-6 and Lockheed Electra aircraft.

Originally an air taxi operator, the group diversified into chartered and scheduled passenger and freight operations, as well as oil-spill response, aerial survey, and pleasure flights through various subsidiaries. The group was broken up as founder Mike Collett approached retirement with the freight arm becoming Atlantic Airlines and the aerial survey work continuing as RVL Aviation.

Many of the remaining classic aircraft were donated to Classic Flight (Classic Air Force) for display at air shows.

== History ==
The Air Atlantique Group was founded in 1969 under the name of General Aviation Services, based in Jersey, Channel Islands. Initially operating as an aircraft sales and distribution business, the company received an Air Operator's Certificate in 1971 and began air taxi operations with Cessna 310 and Cessna 336 aircraft.

The Air Atlantique name was adopted in June 1977 when freight charter flights were launched with Douglas DC-3 aircraft. It was thought the name would both appeal to the French-speaking population of Jersey and appear near the top alphabetically in the Yellow Pages. Freight charter operations commenced on 19 July 1977 with the first flight transporting lobsters from Jersey to Morlaix.

From October 1977, the company stationed a Dakota at Coventry airport to operate a contract transporting car components to Cologne for Ford. The second aircraft was based at Aberdeen operating oil charters. In May 1979, two Douglas DC-6B aircraft were purchased from Greenlandair; however they proved uneconomical to operate due to the oil crisis and were disposed of soon after. The company ventured in to DC-6 operations again in 1987 when two other DC-6s joined the fleet

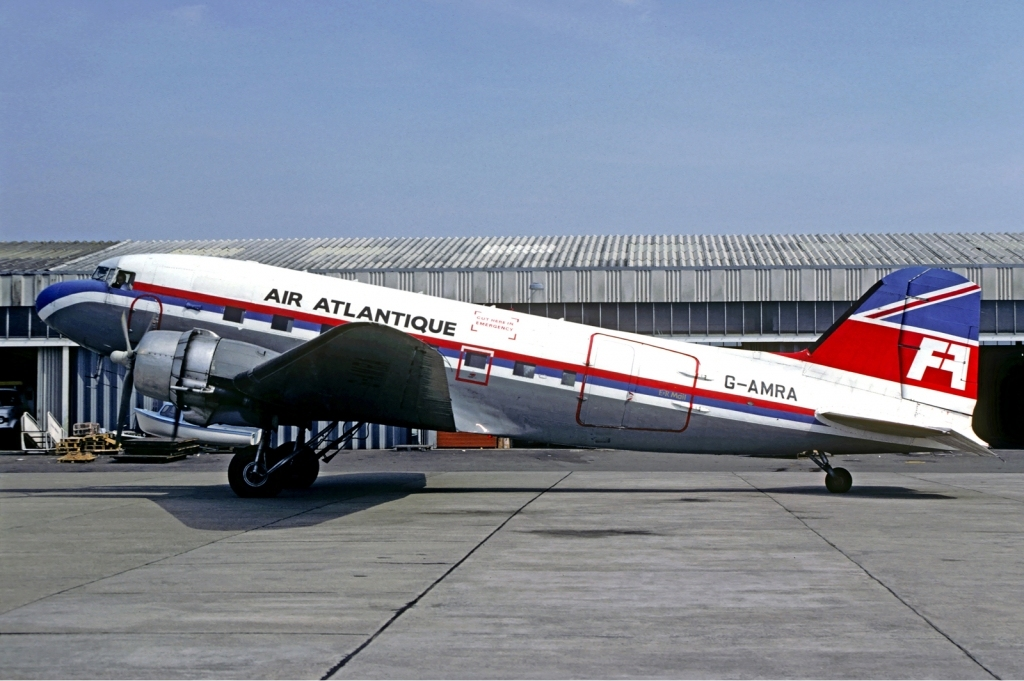
G-AMRA at Jersey, May 1982. Wearing the colours of former operator Eastern Airways. A small Royal Mail logo can be seen on the door.

Between 1981 and 1982 the company purchased additional DC-3s and was awarded a lucrative postal contract on behalf of Royal Mail. A three-year aerial survey contract was also awarded to Air Atlantique by the Ordnance Survey which led to the establishment of the Atlantic Surveys subsidiary. An engineering base was set up in the former British United Airways hangar at Blackpool airport which became the main UK operating base. Three Dakotas stationed at Blackpool operated newspaper flights to Belfast and the Isle of Man, with other aircraft operating nightly mail flights on the Glasgow-East Midlands-Luton and Newcastle-Liverpool runs.

In 1984, the company relocated all cargo operations to Stansted Airport under the subsidiary Atlantic Air Transport. At the same time, an association was formed with Instone Air Line. Instone imported two Bristol Freighters from New Zealand in 1981 to operate freight services; having sold one in 1984 it transferred the second to the Air Atlantique AOC. Air Atlantique operated the aircraft on behalf of Instone until 1987 when it was sold.

In 1985, delays caused by weather and engine problems forced Air Atlantique to sell the Royal Mail contract along with three Dakotas to Air Luton. The Group moved its base for a final time to Coventry in December 1985.

A new livery was introduced in November 1986, featuring a grey and white fuselage with a green stripe. The tail logo of an osprey was not added until 1987 following a competition open to both staff and customers.

Air Atlantique was awarded a five-year maritime pollution control contract by the UK Department of Transport in 1987. The original terms of the contract required seven spray-equipped DC-3s to be kept on standby although this was later revised down to two. Nevertheless, this contract required a significant expansion of the fleet. The first call-out for Air Atlantique was the Piper Alpha disaster on 6 July 1988.

Between then and the late 1990s, it expanded its operations to create pilot training facilities, aircraft engineering shops, survey and aerial reconnaissance work and other aviation-related activities. In 1987 it formed Atlantic Flight Training with the acquisition of two Cessna 310 aircraft and the later addition of seven Cessna 152 aircraft for flight training.

The Atlantic Reconnaissance subsidiary was formed in 1988 to look after the pollution control work alongside other airborne remote sensing, survey, and patrol contracts. In 1994 it was awarded a contract with US-based Marine Oil Spill Response Corporation to operate a Shorts 360 aircraft in a surveillance role. The company was subject to a management buyout in 2007 and moved to a new East Midlands Airport base as RVL Aviation in 2010.

In 1989, the group acquired some of the assets of the bankrupt Malta International Aviation Company (MIACO). The purchase included the CAA-approved engine overhaul capability which was relocated to Coventry and renamed CFS Aeroproducts. The purchase gave Air Atlantique access to a catalogue of spare parts and servicing equipment for DC-3s as well as Pratt & Whitney R-1830 and R-2800 engines CFS was spun off as an independent company in 2007.

Other subsidiaries included Atlantic Aeroengineering which provided maintenance and special mission modification services to the group from the Coventry base. A short lived Irish operation, Aer Atlantic, offered ad-hoc cargo and passenger services using the Shorts 360 aircraft which had returned from operations with Atlantic Reconnaissance in the USA.

Scheduled passenger services between Southampton and the Channel Islands began in 1988 using a leased Hawker Siddeley HS 748 aircraft. Flights operated five times a day with fares of £29 each way; although initially the service was not a success, incurring losses of £750,000 in the first year of operation in the face of stiff competition. The HS 748 was returned to the lessor in March 1989 and the Southampton route dropped. From 1990, scheduled services were operated under the brand Air Corbiere. A Fairchild Metro III was purchased in 1992 to operate alongside the Cessna 406s. The Metro was the only example of the type on the UK aircraft register. Scheduled services, which ended in 1994, included daily flights linking Coventry-Gloucester, Jersey/Guernsey to Rennes, and Liverpool to the Channel Islands.

In 1991, on account of two pollution control DC-3s being based at Inverness Airport, the group founded Air Alba as a flight training school based at the airport. It was renamed Highland Airways in February 1997. The airline expanded into freight and passenger operations as well as contract work for the oil industry and the Scottish Fisheries Protection Agency. Highland Airways was subject to a management buyout in 2007.

In late 1993, the group was restructured with the passenger operations of Air Atlantique/Air Corbiere combined under the name Atlantic Airways. The cargo operations of Atlantic Air Transport became Atlantic Cargo. However all Dakota operations, including pleasure flights and pollution control work, continued to use the Air Atlantique name.

The group purchased a 150-year lease of Coventry Airport from the local authority in June 1998. It was later sold to the TUI group in 2007 as Atlantique began to divest its assets.

The group was restructured again in 1998 with all passenger and cargo operations reorganised into a new unit called Atlantic Airlines. A new livery was introduced featuring a dark black fuselage with green stripes. As with the previous rebranding, all non-airline operations including DC-3 work retained the Air Atlantique name.

In August 2002, the group created the Atlantic Express brand to cater for executive passenger and ad-hoc freight charter work. Operations began with the group's Metro III and Cessna 406 aircraft along with a leased Embraer 120 Brasilia. Operations expanded with the introduction of ATR 42 and ATR 72 aircraft between 2003 and 2005. From May 2006 to January 2007, Atlantic Express operated a scheduled route between Jersey and Stansted.

The main trading activities of Atlantic Airlines were subject to a management buy-out in July 2004 which saw all Lockheed L-188 Electra cargo operations transfer to an independent company, Atlantic Airlines.

Following the divestment of most subsidiaries, Air Atlantique later operated a number of historic aircraft as the Classic Air Force. Pleasure flights of the DC-3 on the Atlantique air operator's certificate ceased in the summer of 2008 owing to new safety regulations which required extensive modification of the airframes which proved uneconomical.

== Fleet ==
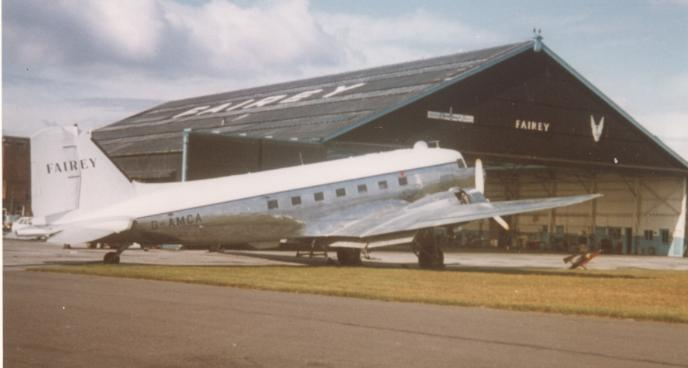
G-AMCA operating for Fairey Air Surveys, 1975. This would become the first aircraft to enter service with Air Atlantique in June 1977.

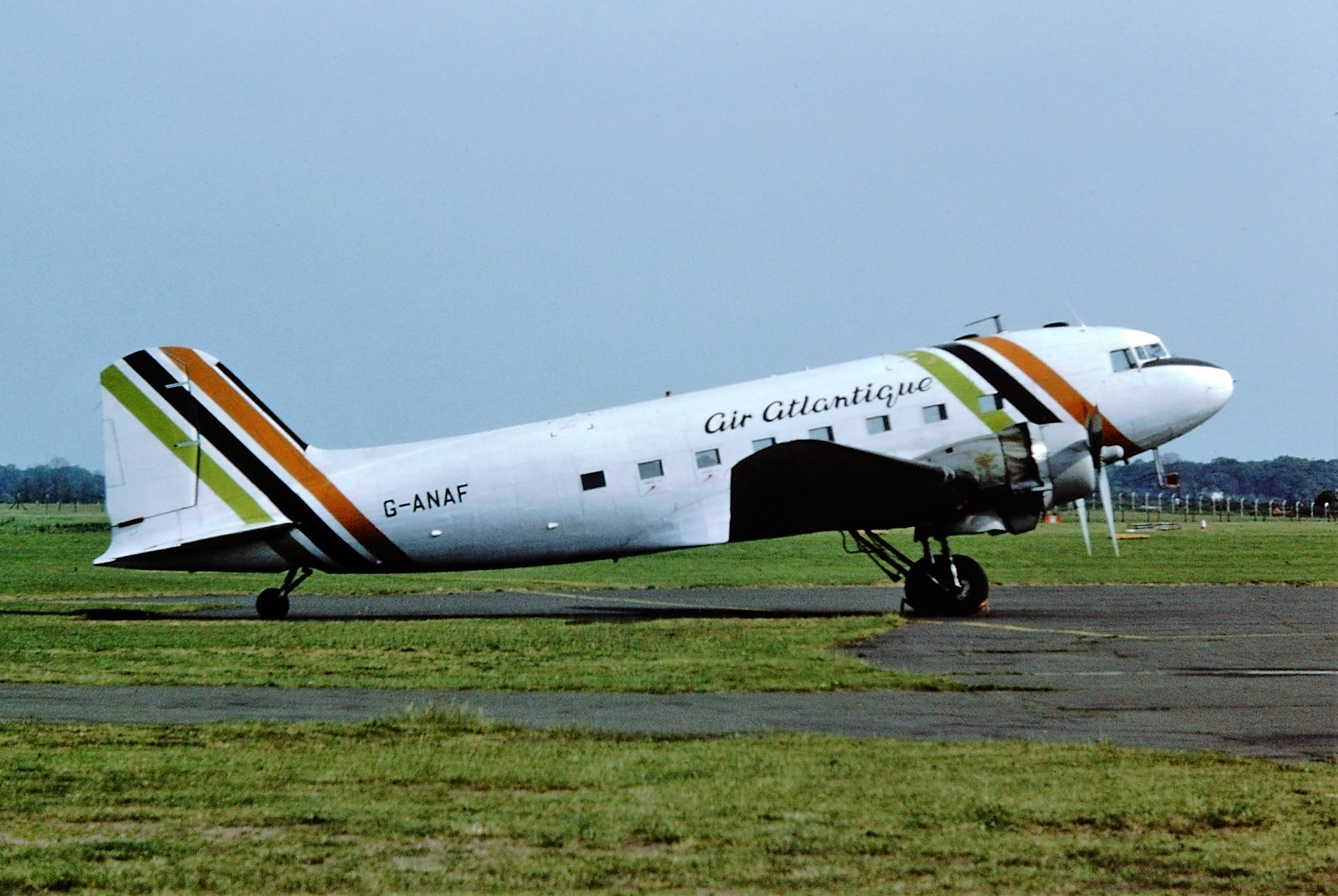
G-ANAF at Coventry, July 1978

The first DC-3, G-ANAF, was purchased from West Country Aviation in 1977 for £72,000. G-ANAF required extensive restoration so a second DC-3, G-AMCA was leased from Fairey Aviation and became the first DC-3 to enter service. G-AMCA was then also purchased outright for £45,000 later that year.

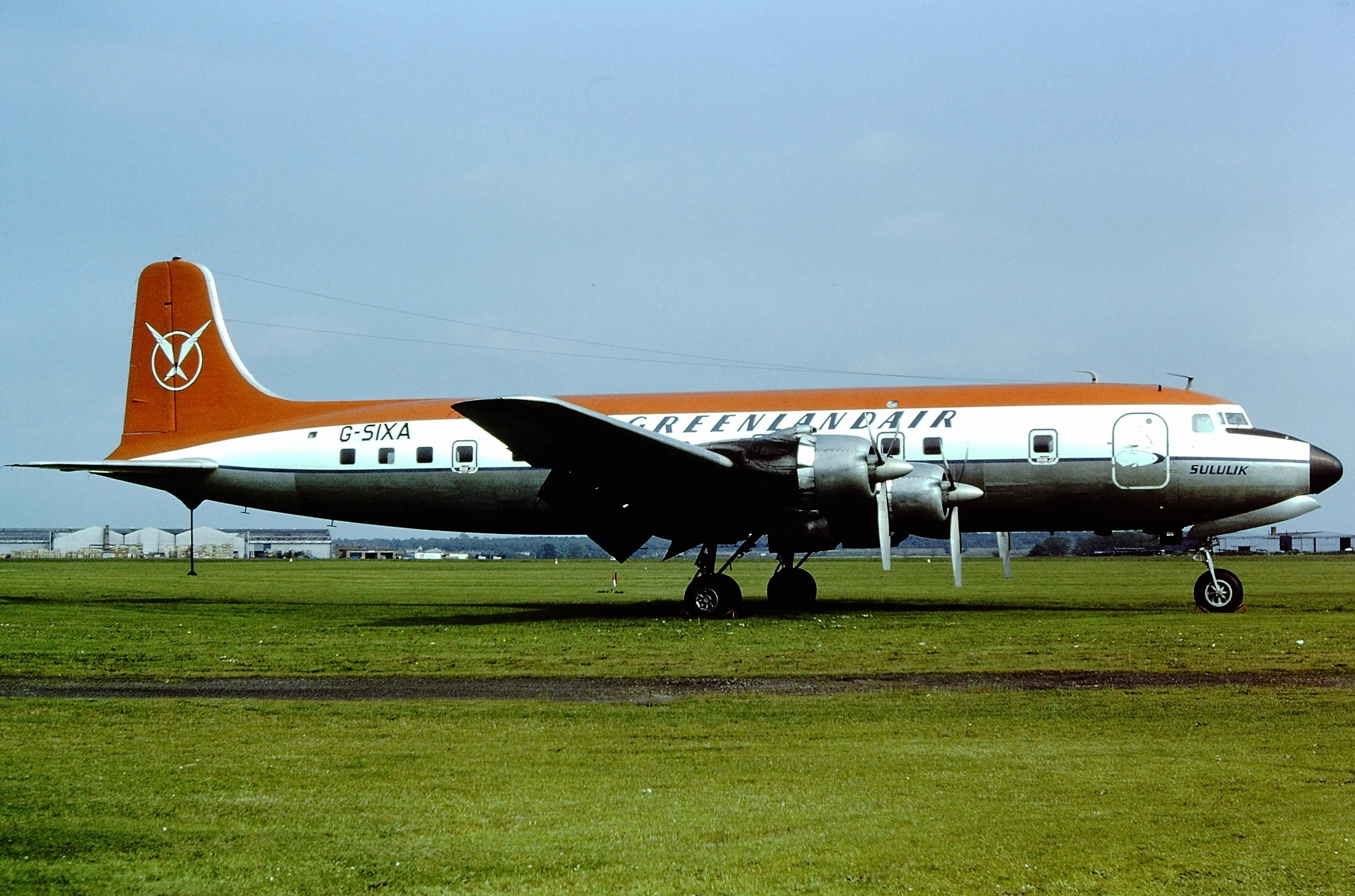
G-SIXA at Coventry in June 1979, still wearing the livery of former operator Greenlandair.

Two Douglas DC-6B aircraft, G-SIXA and G-SIXB, were purchased in May 1979. Proving uneconomical to operate, the former was placed in to storage at Manston Airport and later scrapped, whilst the later was sold to Air Swaziland in December 1979.

Between 1981 and 1982, eight further DC-3s were purchased although two were sold on within a month, bringing the total Dakota fleet to eight aircraft by 1982. Three DC-3s, G-ANAF, G-AMPO, and G-AMHJ were sold along with the Royal Mail contract to Air Luton in 1985.

A Bristol Type 170 Freighter, G-BISU, joined the Atlantique fleet in 1984 and was operated on behalf of Instone Air Line until 1987 when it was retired to the Imperial war Museum and then later sold to Canadian operator Trans Provincial. It was one of the last commercially operating B170s in the world.

Air Atlantique became a DC-6 operator again in 1987 with the addition of two aircraft. The first aircraft, G-SIXC, was purchased from an operator in the US for $650,000 and entered service in April 1987. The second, G-APSA, had been in storage in Yemen and required extensive restoration by HeavyLift Engineering at Southend Airport. The aircraft was owned by Instone but operated on its behalf by Air Atlantique under the same arrangements as the Bristol Freighter and entered service in 1988.

In 1987, G-AMCA was removed from freight work and flown to Greybull, Wyoming for conversion to spray configuration by Hawkins & Powers. Air Atlantique then converted a second DC-3, G-AMHJ, which was re-acquired having been sold off with the postal contract two years earlier. The pollution control contract required the use of a Cessna 402 fitted with an Ericsson side looking airborne radar to detect oil spills which resulted in G-MPCU joining the fleet in early 1988. Five BN-2 Islanders (G-AXZK, G-BCEN, G-BELF, G-BNXA, G-BNXB) joined the fleet from September 1987 and were converted to spray configuration at Coventry.

Atlantic Flight Training began operations with two Cessna 310 aircraft, G-BODY and G-SOUL, which were used as twin engine and instrument training aircraft. In 1988 the company fleet swelled in size with the arrival of 7 Cessna 152's in shipping containers, these being registered as G-HART (Tail Wheel conversion), G-BPBG, G-BPBH, G-BPBI, G-BPBJ, G-BPBK and G-BPBL with BH/I/J/K & L all being sold in 1990.

Concern about the future viability of piston DC-6 operations meant Atlantique leased two Lockheed L-188 Electra aircraft in late 1993. Since the first aircraft required maintenance, short term lift was leased in from Renown Aviation using N360Q.The first aircraft, G-LOFA, eventually entered service in early 1994 followed by a second, G-LOFB, that summer. A third Electra joined the fleet in the summer of 1995 followed by two more in 1997. Following the closure of Hunting Cargo Airlines in 1998, three more Electras were purchased. The first aircraft, G-LOFA, was retired in 1998 bringing the operational fleet to seven. A number of additional airframes were purchased for spare parts including two former Fred Olsen Airtransport aircraft. At a cost of $500,000 per aircraft, Air Atlantique modified each Electra for two-crew operation and installed new mode-S transponders, TCAS, electrical generators, and 8.33 kHz capable radios in order to meet new regulatory requirements. The seven active Electras left the Atlantique fleet to operate for the newly independent Atlantic Airlines in 2004. Canadian airline Buffalo Airways later purchased a number of Electras and spare parts from Atlantic.

The first ATR 42-300, G-IONA, joined the Atlantique fleet in December 2002. It operated for various subsidiaries within the group including Highland Airways and Atlantic Express and was used by the Liberal Democrats during the 2005 UK General Election. Two further ATR 42-300s, G-RHUM and G-DRFC, were delivered in 2004 and 2005. A larger ATR 72-200, G-HERM, joined the fleet in October 2005.

== Gallery ==
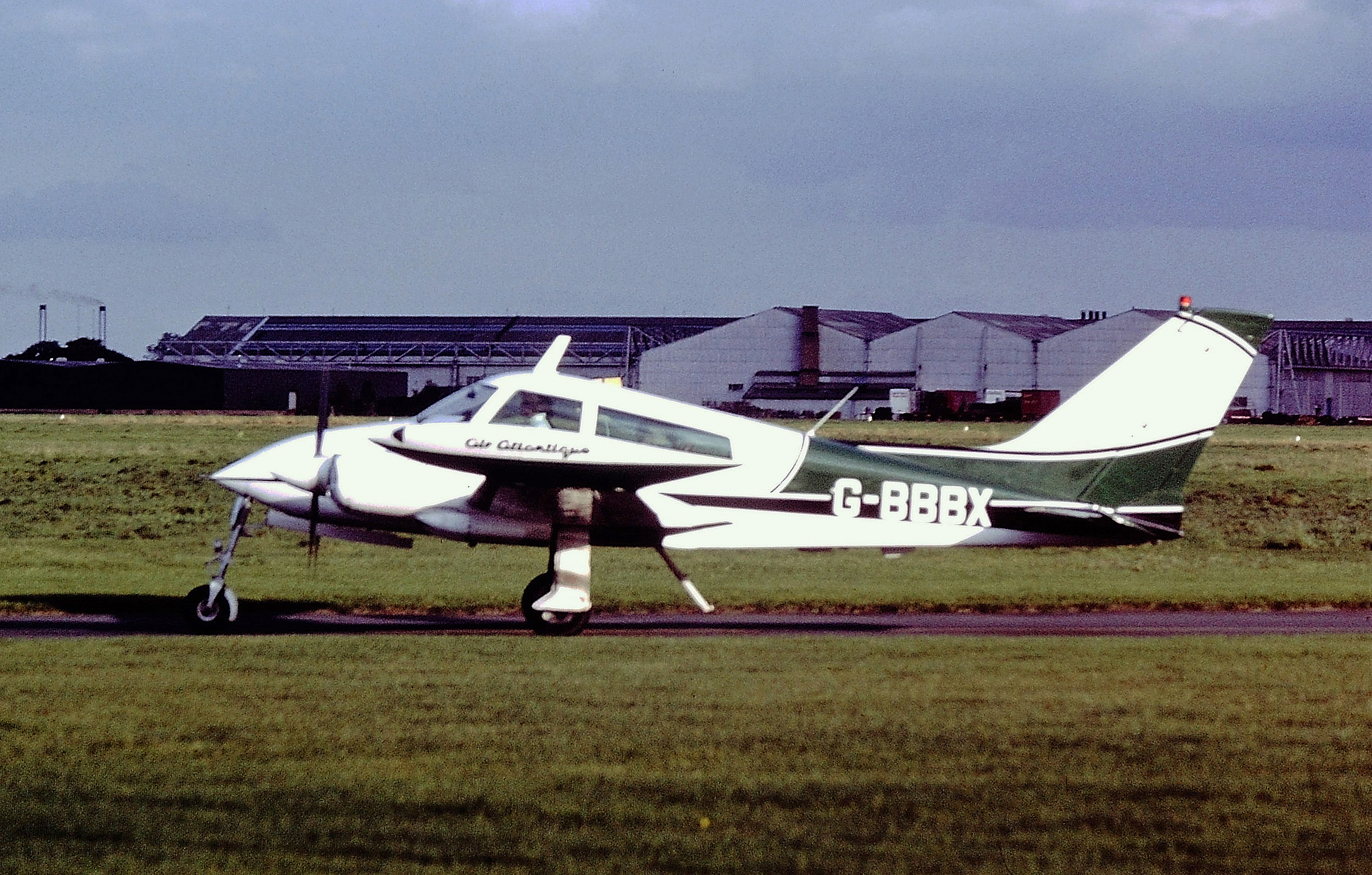
Cessna 310

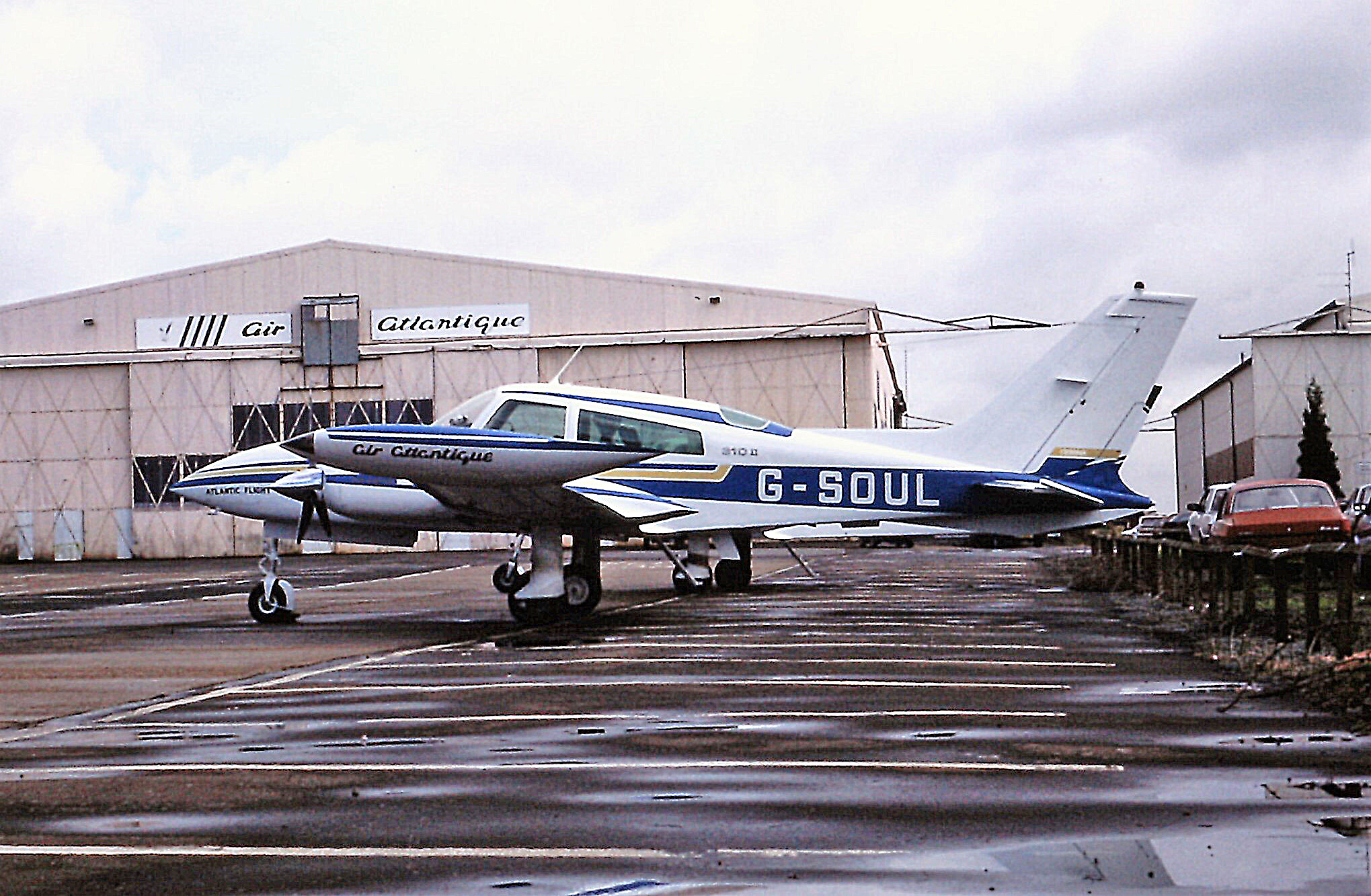
Cessna 310

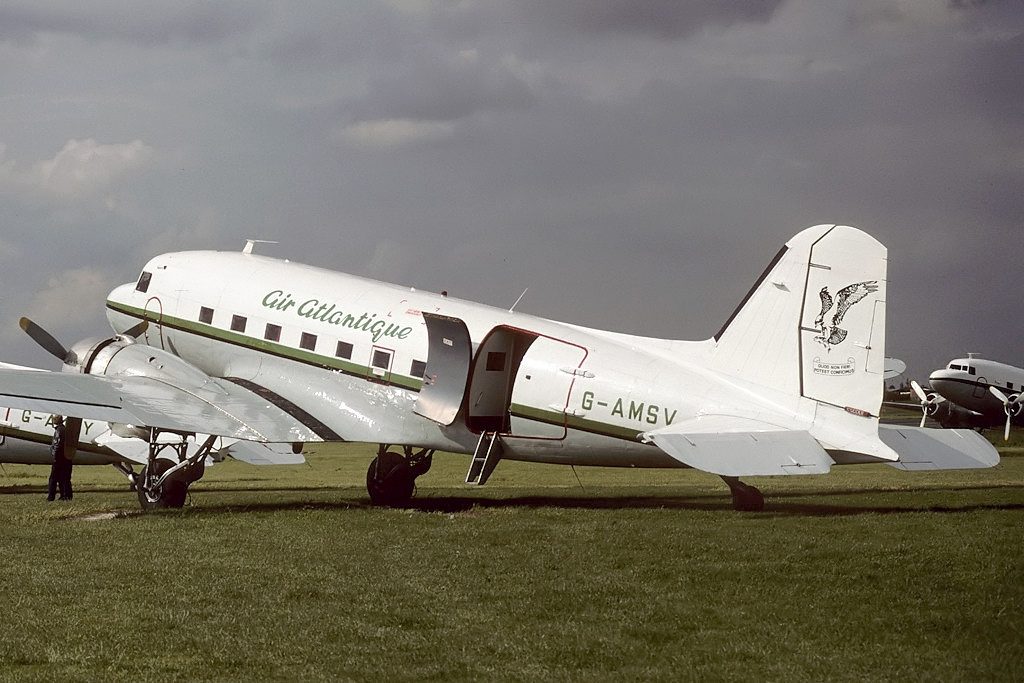
Douglas DC3 in the very first colors

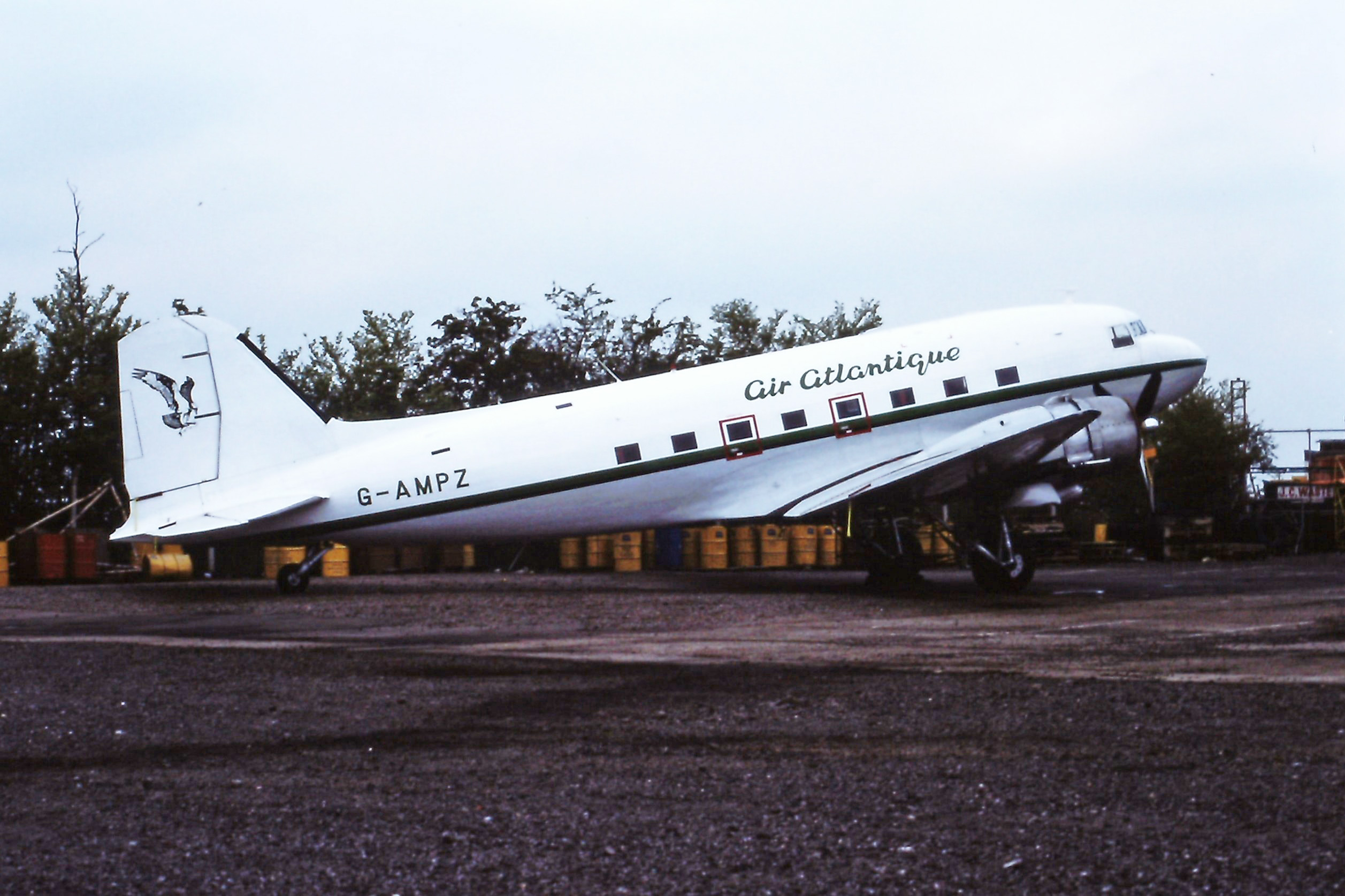
G-AMPZ at Coventry in May 1991 wearing the livery with osprey tail logo

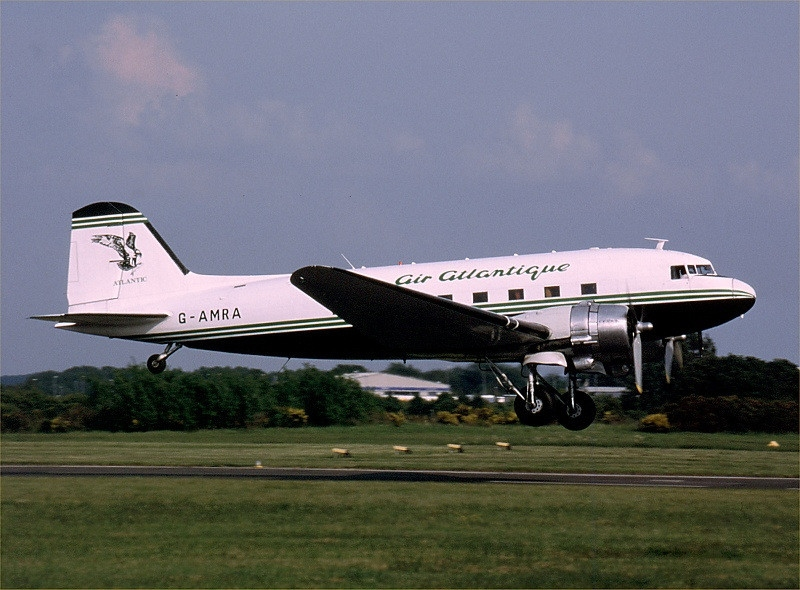
Douglas DC3 in retouched livery

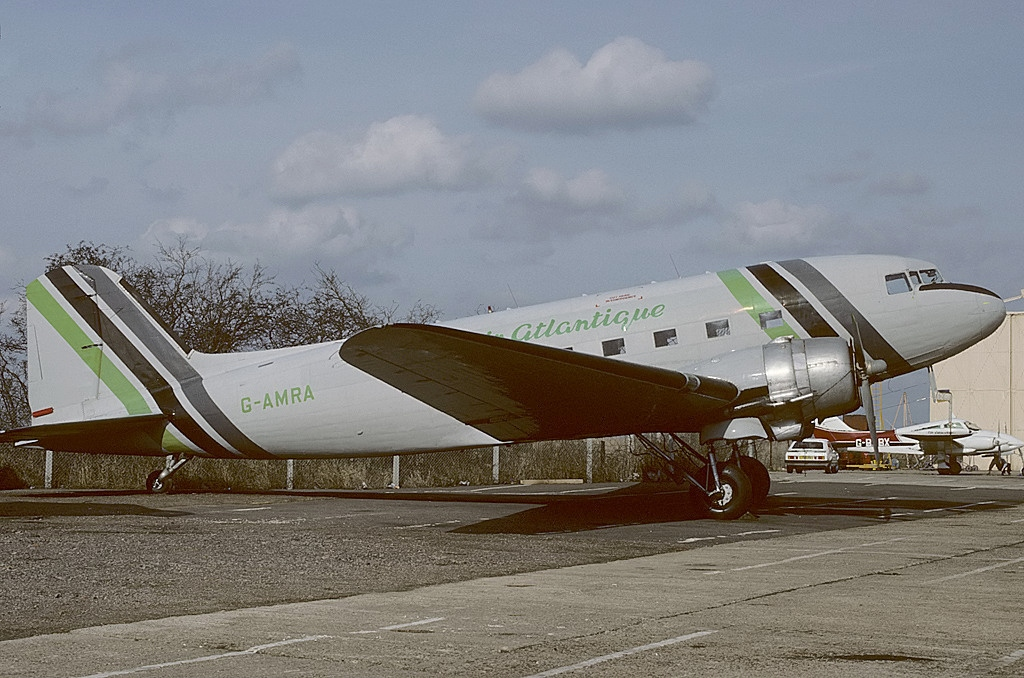
Douglas DC3 in a more colorful livery

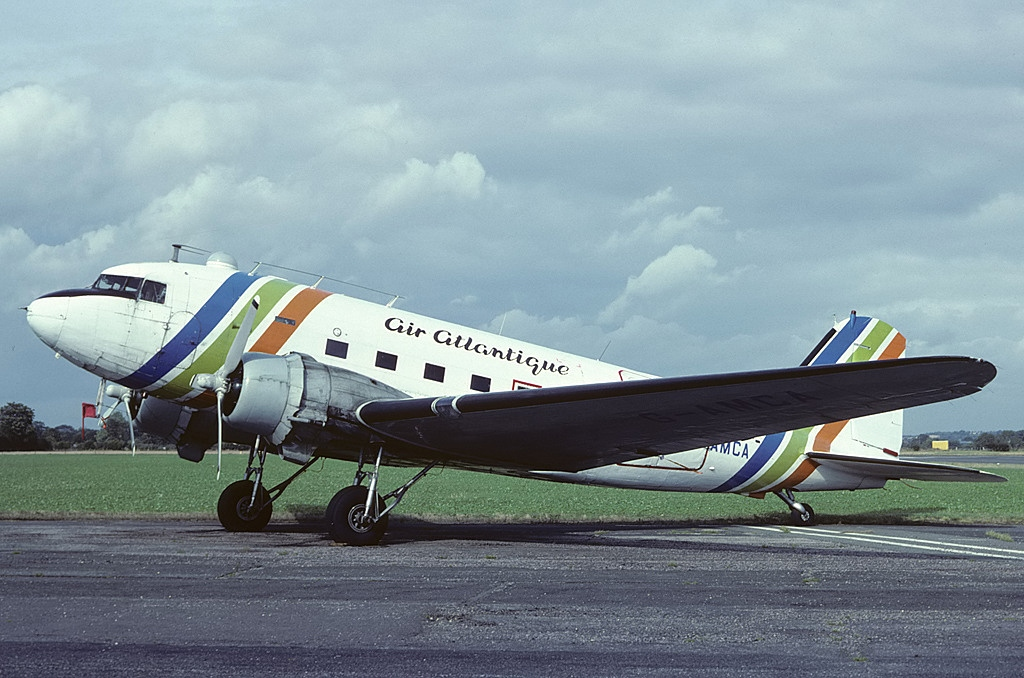
Douglas DC3 in colorful livery variation

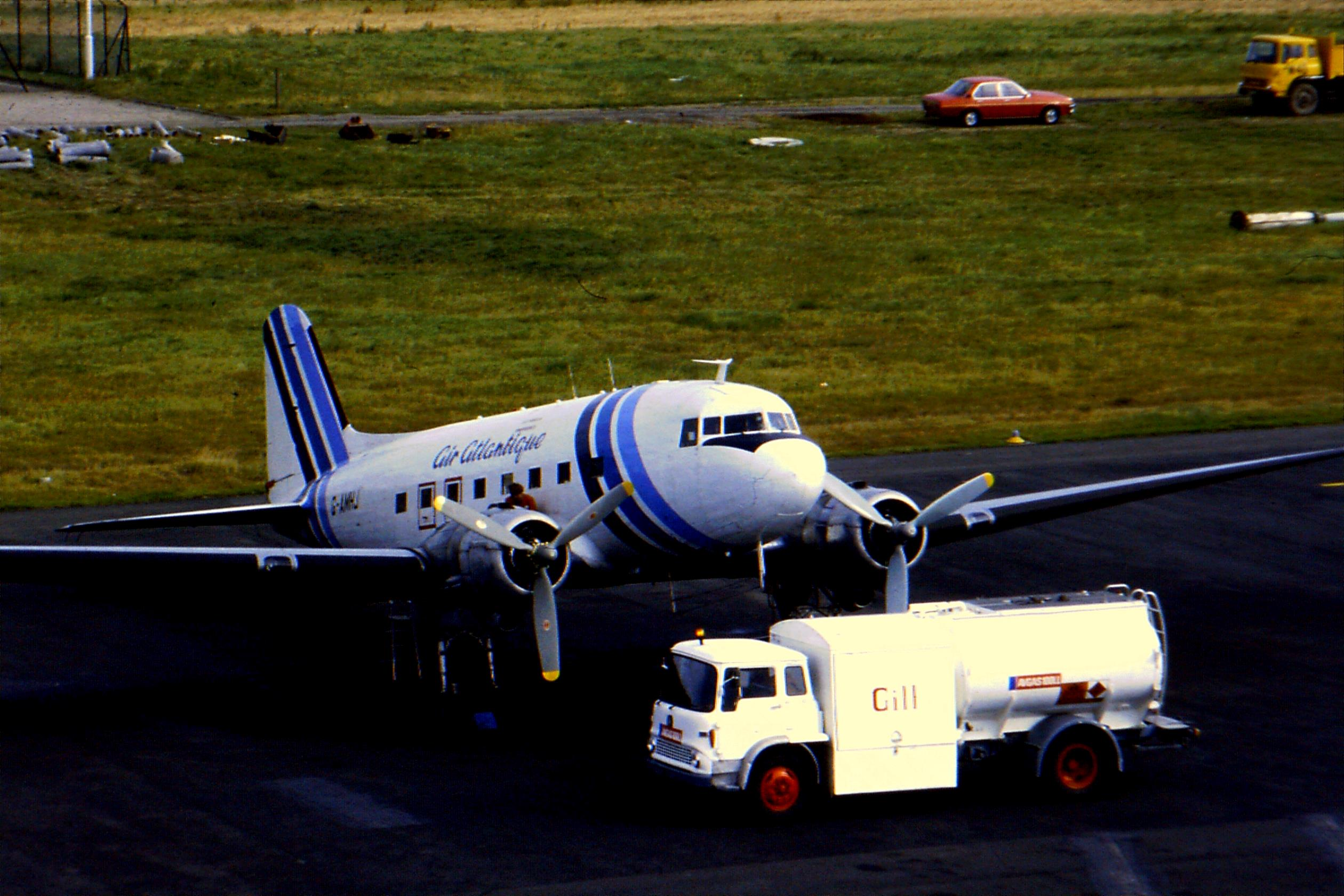
Douglas DC3 in colorful livery variation

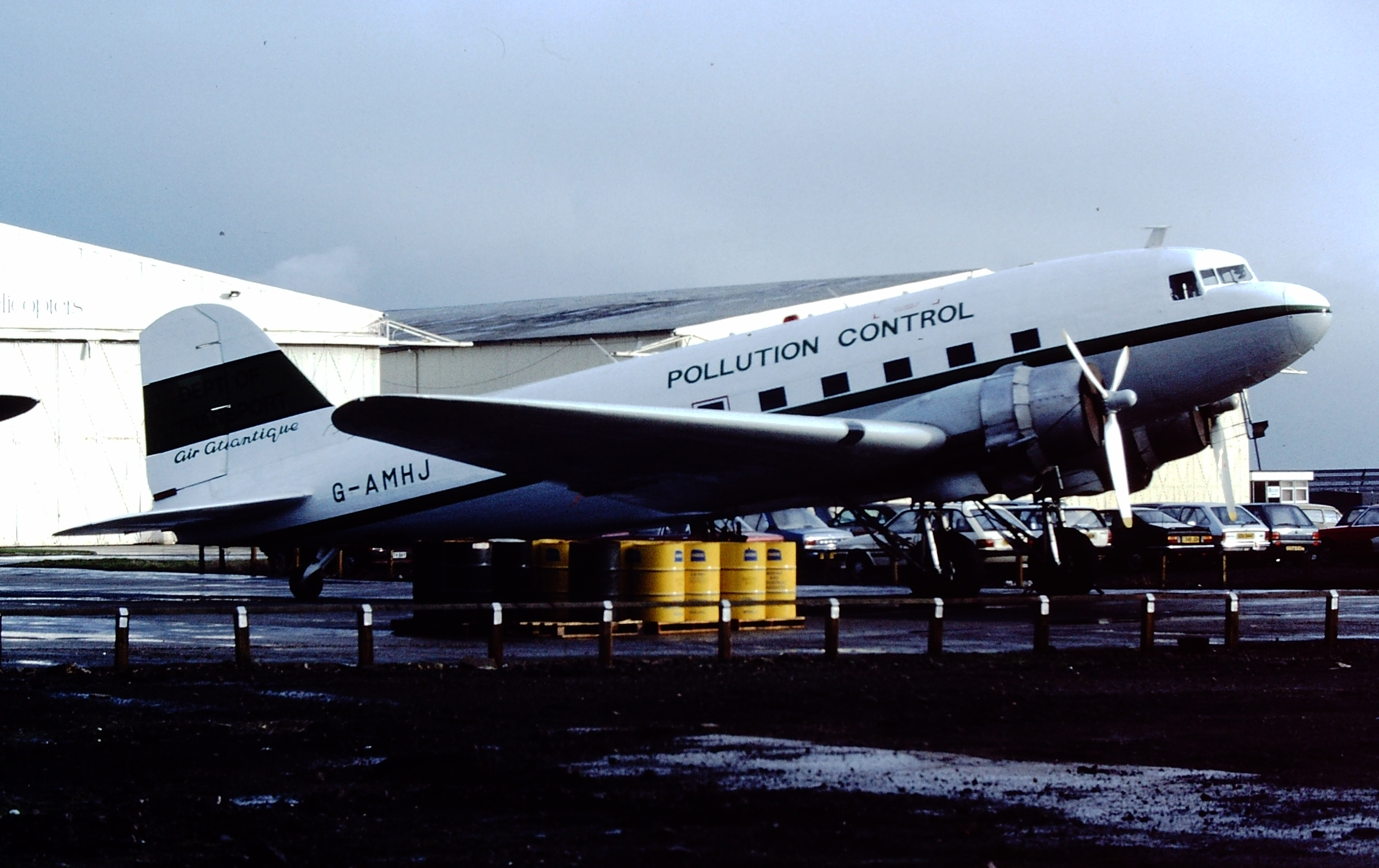
Douglas DC3 operated for pollution control

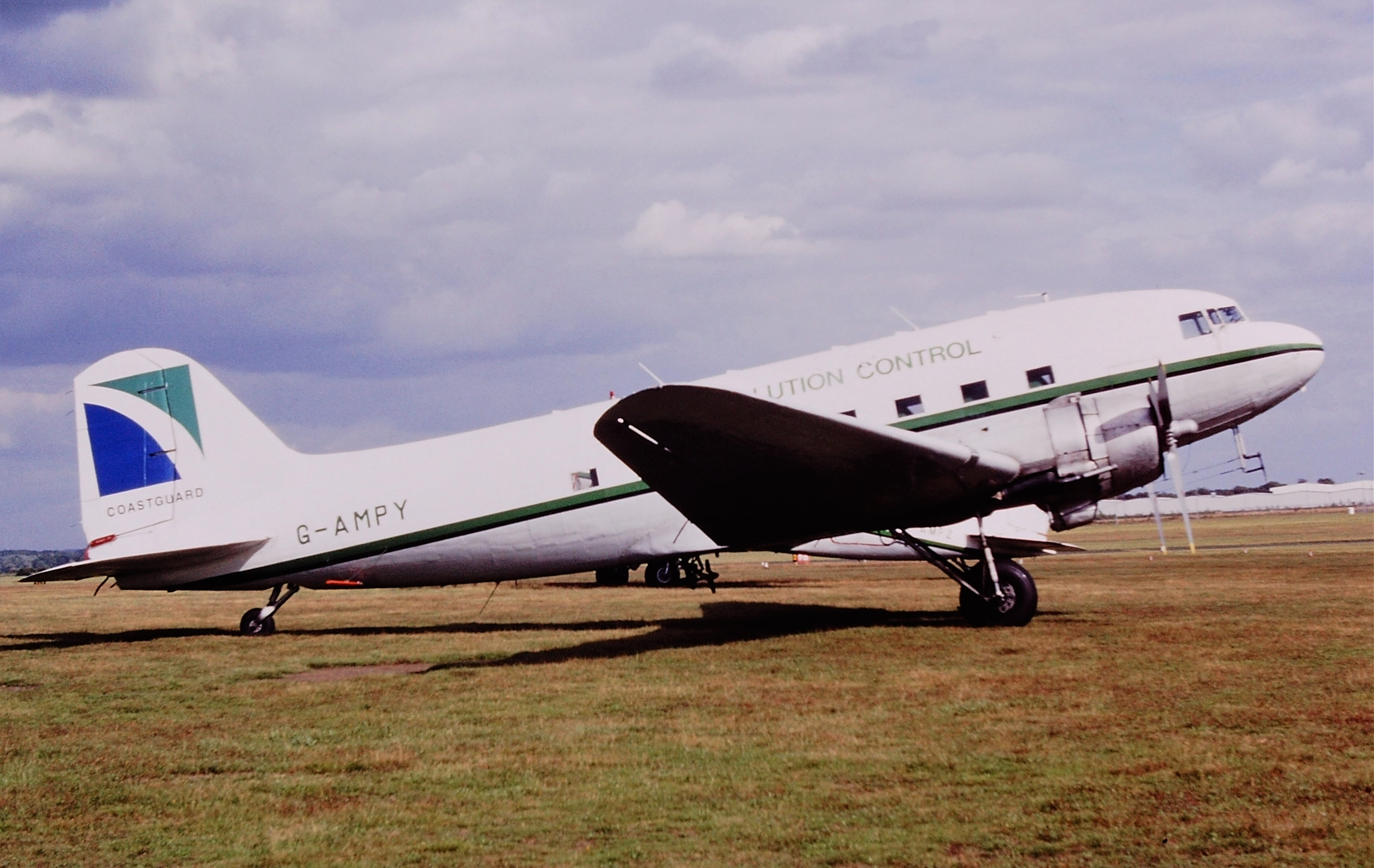
Douglas DC3 operated for pollution control

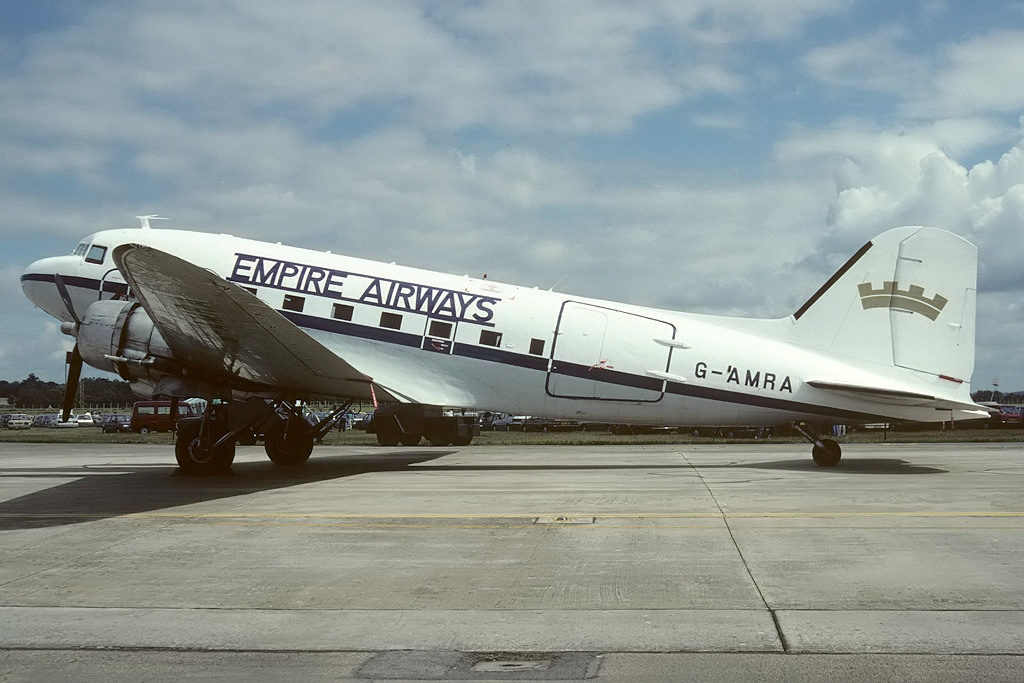
Douglas DC3 in the livery of a fictional airline for the filming of a movie

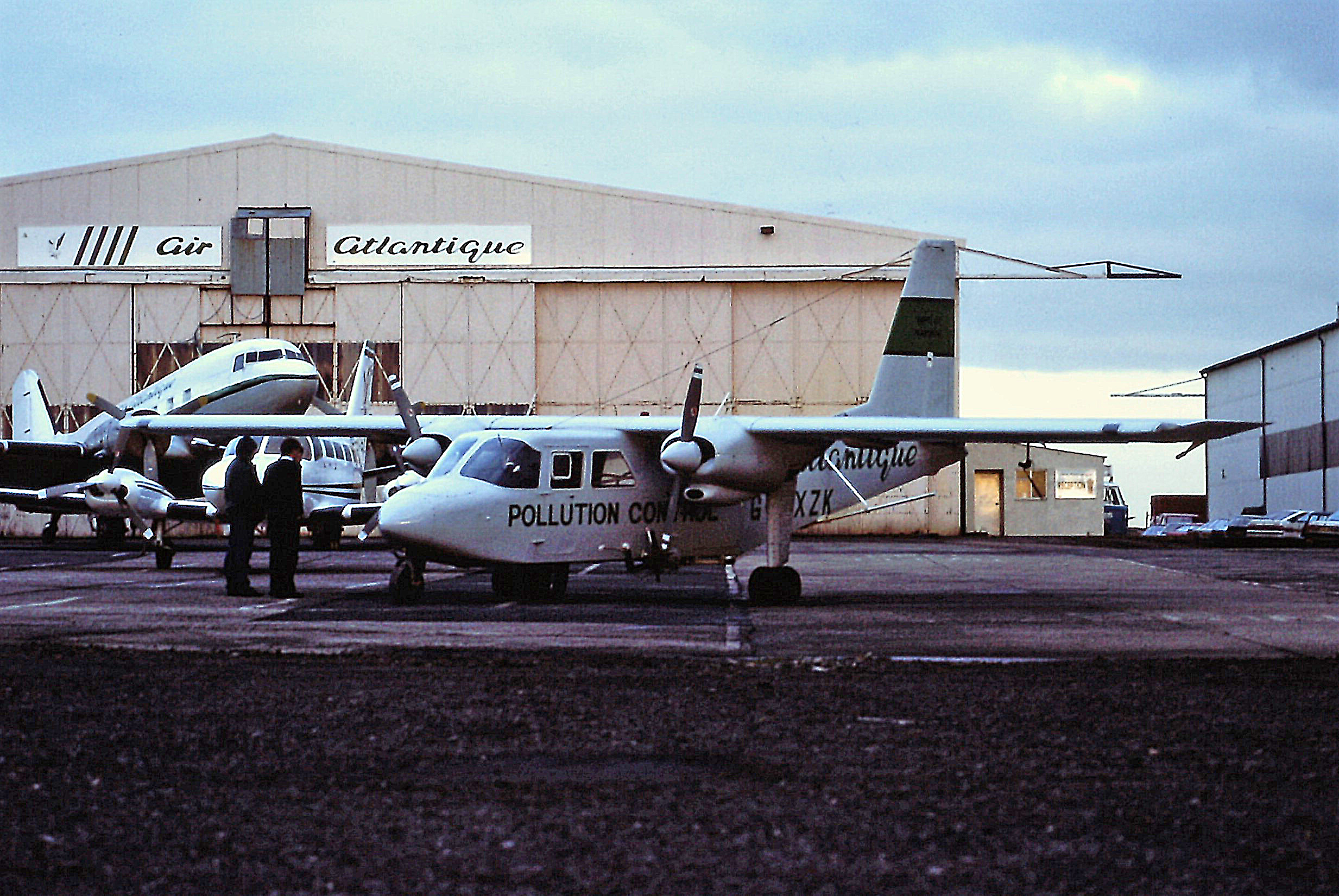
BN2 Islander operated for pollution control

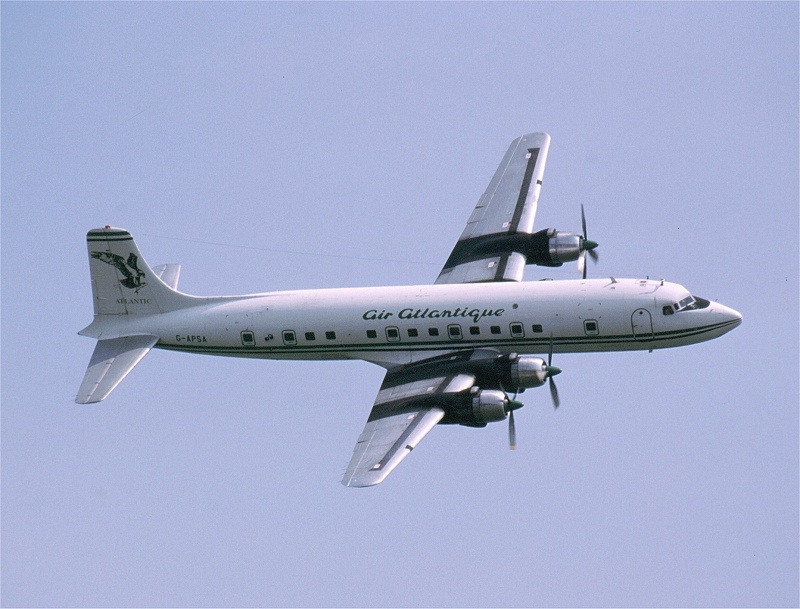
Douglas DC6

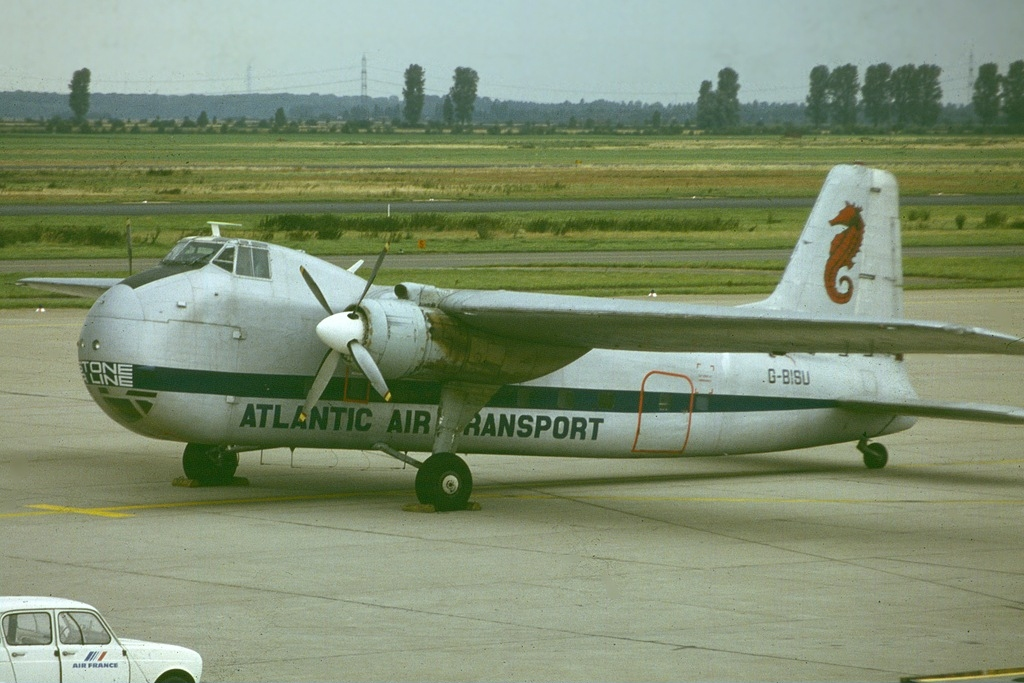
Bristol B-170

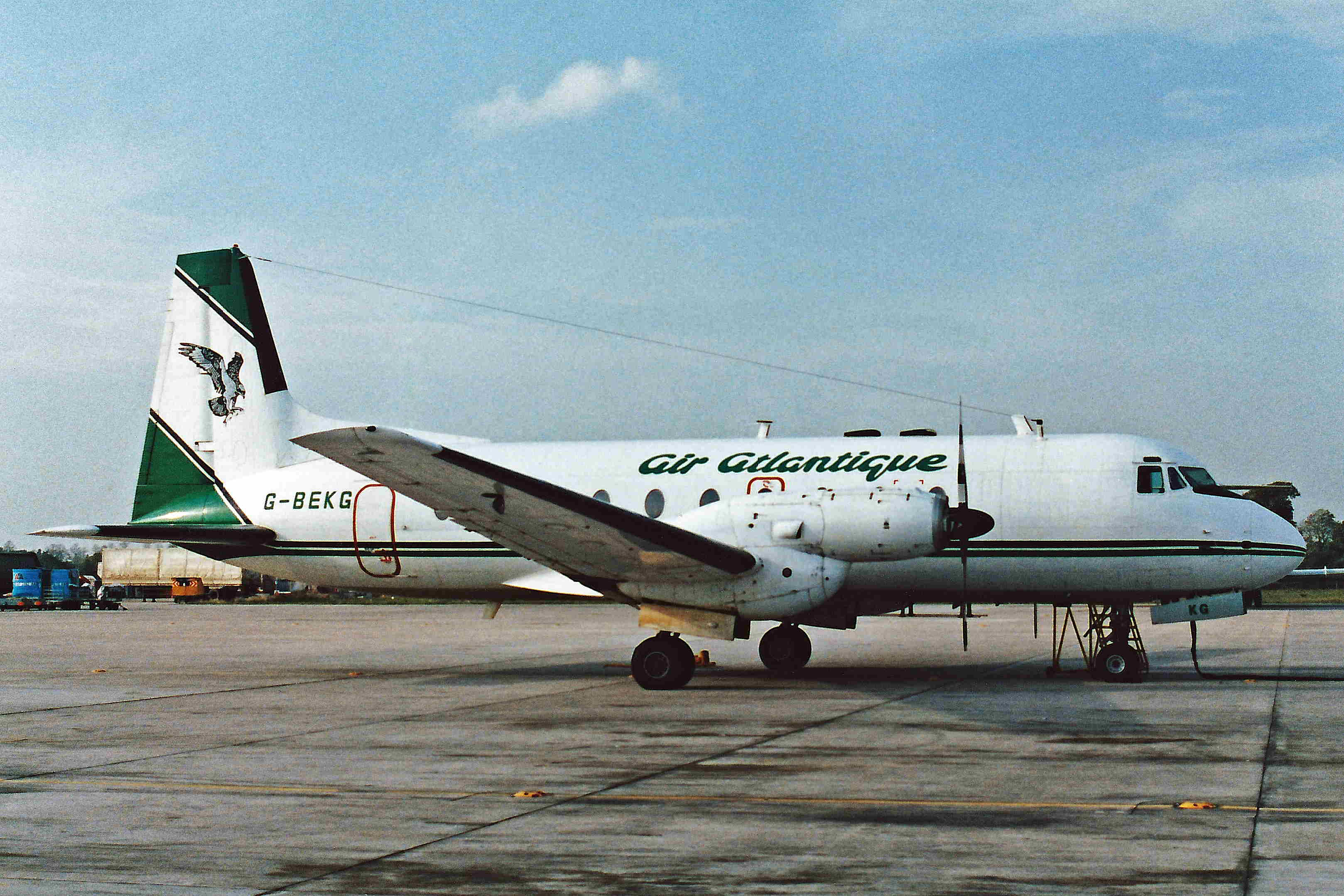
BAe (Avro) 748

== Subsidiaries and associated brands ==
Atlantic Air Transport (1984–1989)

From 16 May 1984 till January 1989, the airline relocated all cargo operations to Stansted Airport under Atlantic Air Transport brand. It mainly operated DC 3s and B-170s.

Atlantic Flight Training

The subsidiary was formed in 1987 after the acquisition of two Cessna 310 aircraft and the later addition of seven Cessna 152 aircraft for flight training.

Atlantic Reconnaissance (1988–2007)

The subsidiary was formed in 1988 to look after the pollution control work alongside other airborne remote sensing, survey, and patrol contracts. Cesssna Titan, Cessna Caravan and DC 3 were the types of aircraft involved in the activities. In 1994 it was awarded a contract from US-based Marine Oil Spill Response Corporation to operate a Shorts 360 aircraft in a surveillance role. The company was subject to a management buyout in 2007 and moved to a new East Midlands Airport base after being reformed as RVL Aviation.

Air Corbiere (1991–1993)

From July 26, 1991, scheduled services were operated under this brand with Cessna Caravan II and Cessna 402C. A Fairchild Metro III was purchased in 1992 to operate alongside the Cessna 406s. The Metro was the only example of the type on the UK aircraft register. Scheduled services included daily flights linking Coventry-Gloucester, Jersey/Guernsey to Rennes, and Liverpool to the Channel Islands. In late 1993, the brand was abolished and the passenger operations combined with those of Air Atlantique under Atlantic Airways brand.

Air Alba (1991–1997)

In 1991, on account of two pollution control DC-3s being based at Inverness Airport, the Group founded the company as a flight training school based at the airport. Airline-type operations started after it was renamed Highland Airways in February 1997.

Atlantic Airways (1993–1998)

Trading name of Air Atlantique and Air Corbiere passenger scheduled operations from early 1993 to spring 1998 operated with Air Atlantique aircraft.

Atlantic Cargo (1993–1998)

Trading name of Air Atlantique freight operations from early 1993 to spring 1998.

Atlantic Airlines (1998–2009)

Trading name of Air Atlantique charter operations from March 1998 and of L.188F cargo operations from summer 2001. The main trading activities were subject to a management buy-out in July 2004 which saw all Lockheed L-188 Electra cargo operations transferred to a fully registered independent company, Atlantic Airlines Ltd. In 2009 it merged operations with West Air Sweden and in Autumn 2017 into West Atlantic UK Ltd.

Atlantic Express (2002–2006) and Atlantic Express Ltd. (2006–2008)

In August 2002, the Group established Atlantic Express brand to cater for executive passenger and ad-hoc freight charter work. Operations began with the group's Fairchild Metro III and Cessna 406 aircraft along with a leased Embraer 120 Brasilia. Operations expanded with the introduction of leased ATR 42 and ATR 72 aircraft between 2003 and 2005. On 6 July 2006 the brand was transformed into a fully registered airline - Atlantic Express Ltd. - which operated a scheduled route between Jersey and Stansted which did not last. Even residual passenger and charter flight operations were interrupted in early February 2007. Under the new ownership of Bravo Aviation and Skyblue Aviation the resumption of activities was announced for the beginning of 2008 but nothing came to fruition.

Atlantic Surveys

A three-year aerial survey contract was also awarded to Air Atlantique by the Ordnance Survey which led to the establishment of this subsidiary.

Other subsidiaries included Atlantic Aeroengineering which provided maintenance and special mission modification services to the Group in Coventry ground base.

A short lived Ireland-based operation, Aer Atlantic, offered ad-hoc cargo and passenger services using the Shorts 360 aircraft which had returned from operations with Atlantic Reconnaissance in the USA.

== Gallery ==
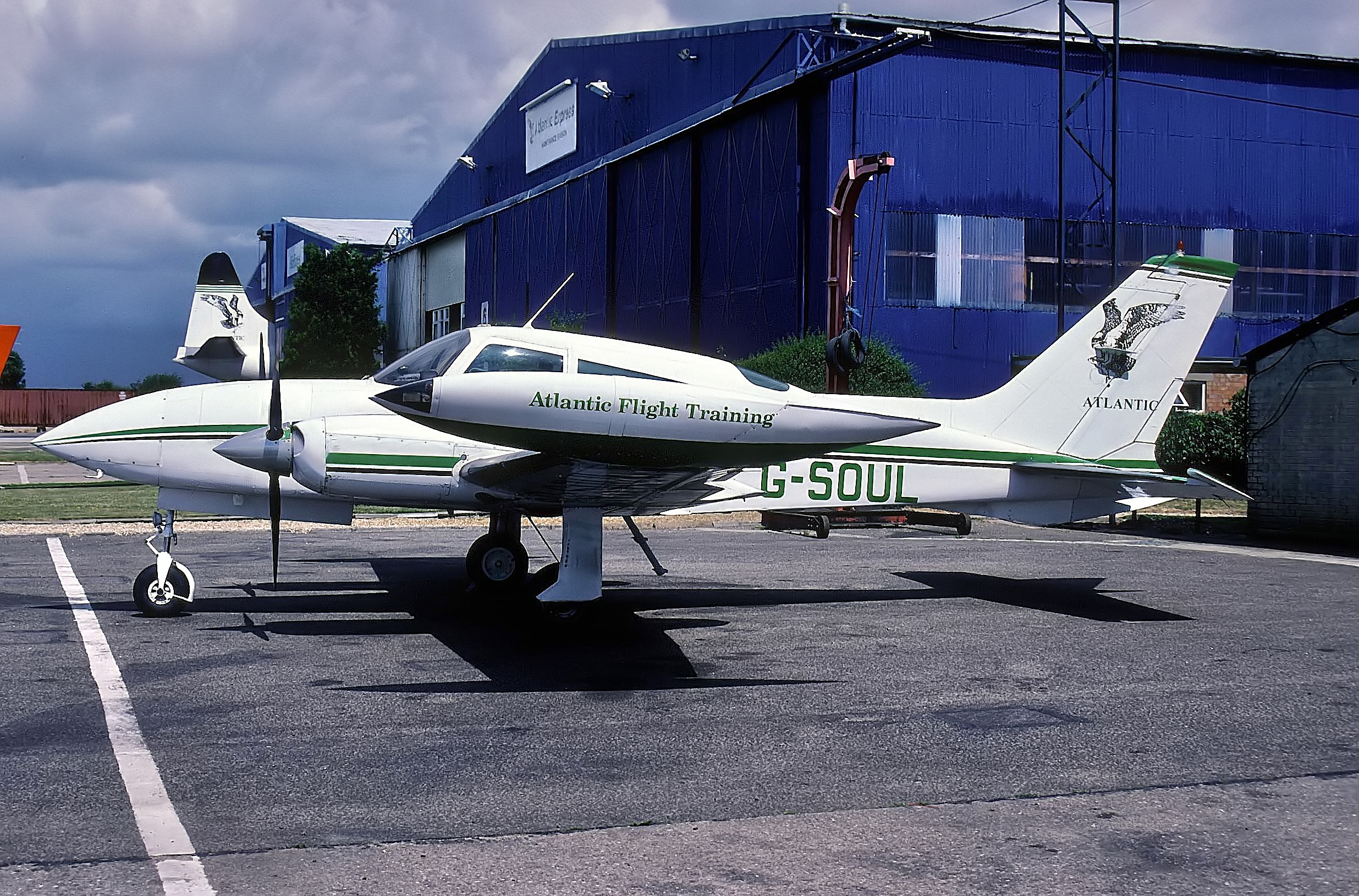
Cessna 310R of Atlantic Flight Training

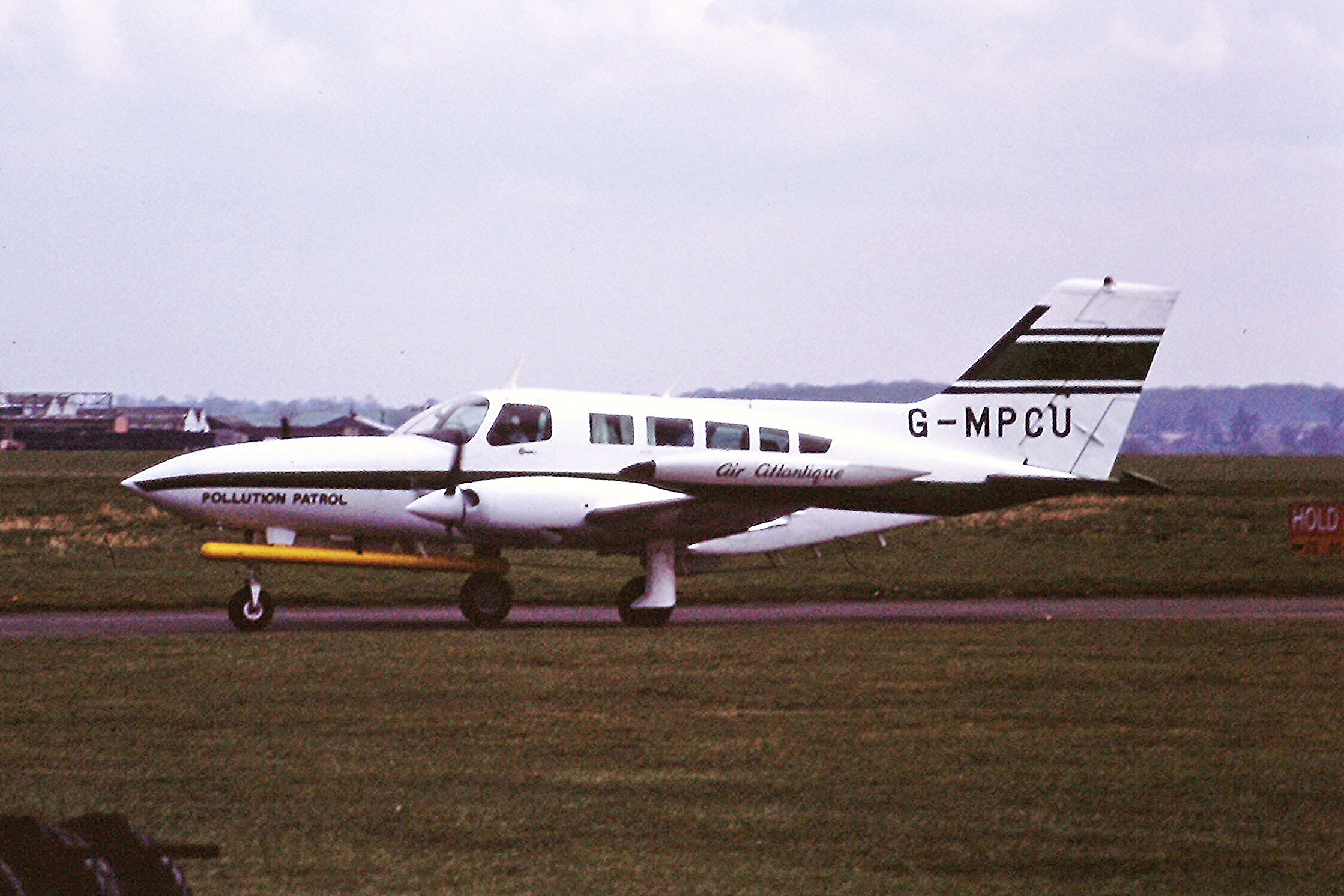
Cessna 402 fitted with the side looking radar

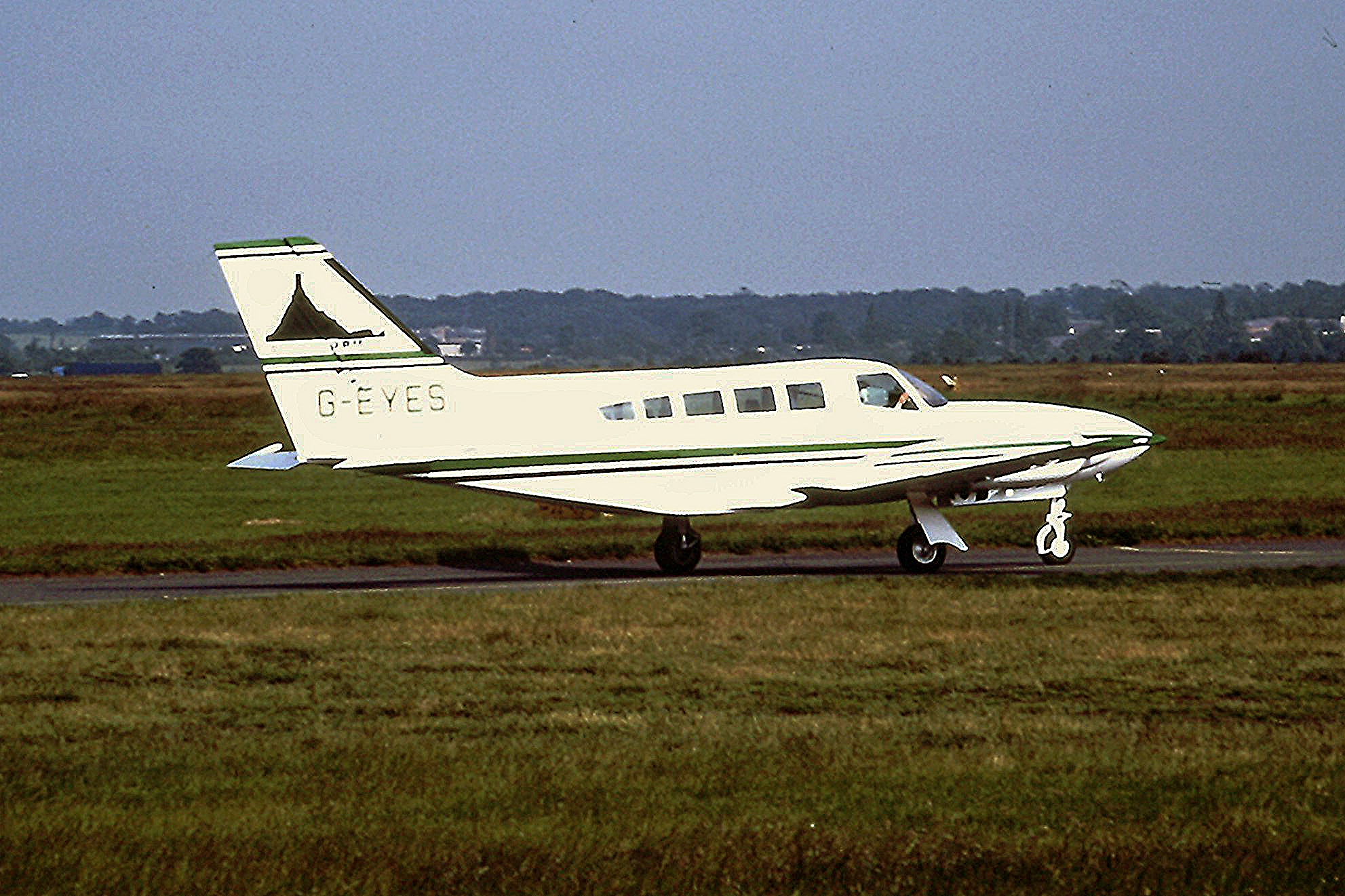
Cessna 402 with Air Corbiere titles

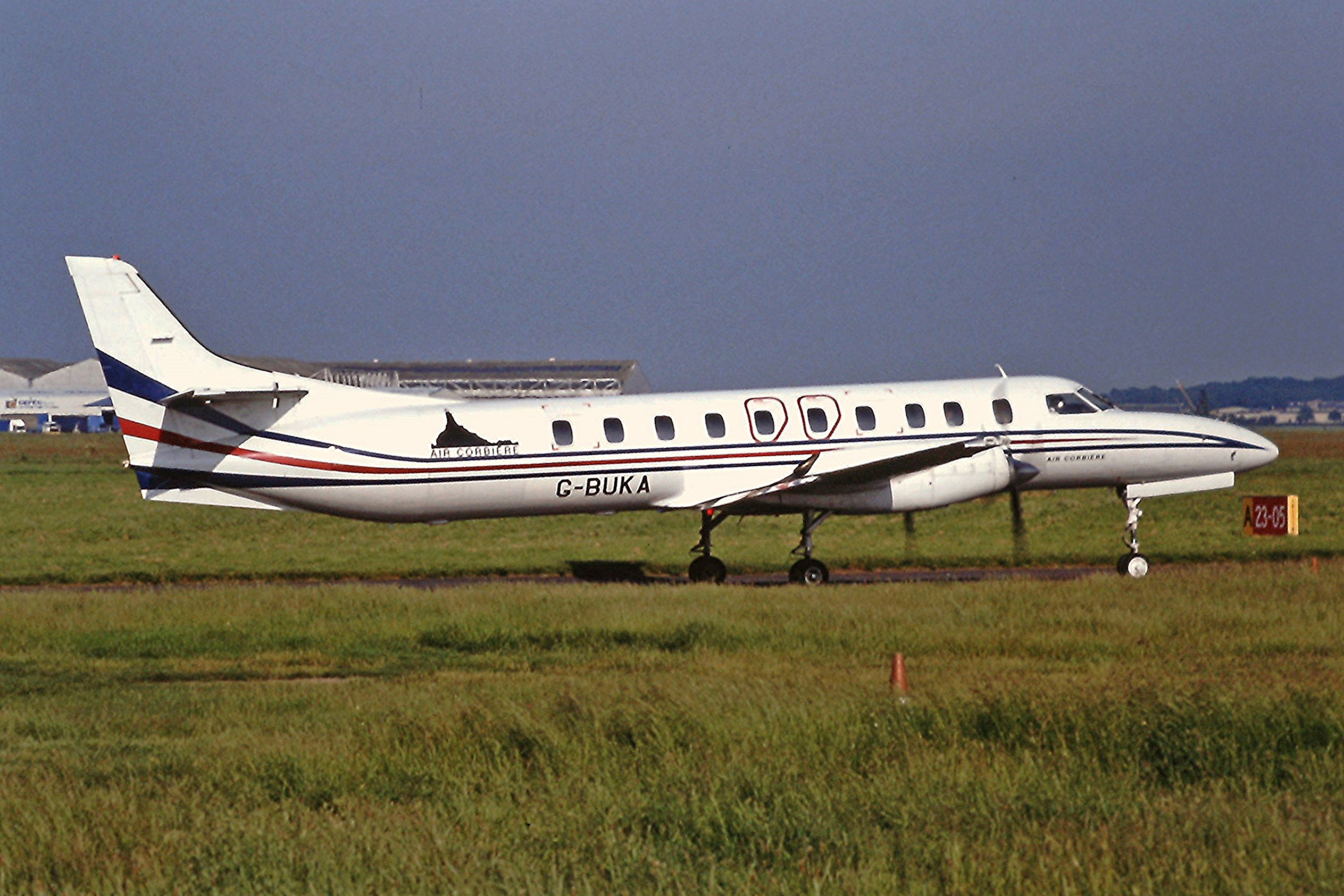
Swearingen SA-227AC Metro III with Air Corbiere titles

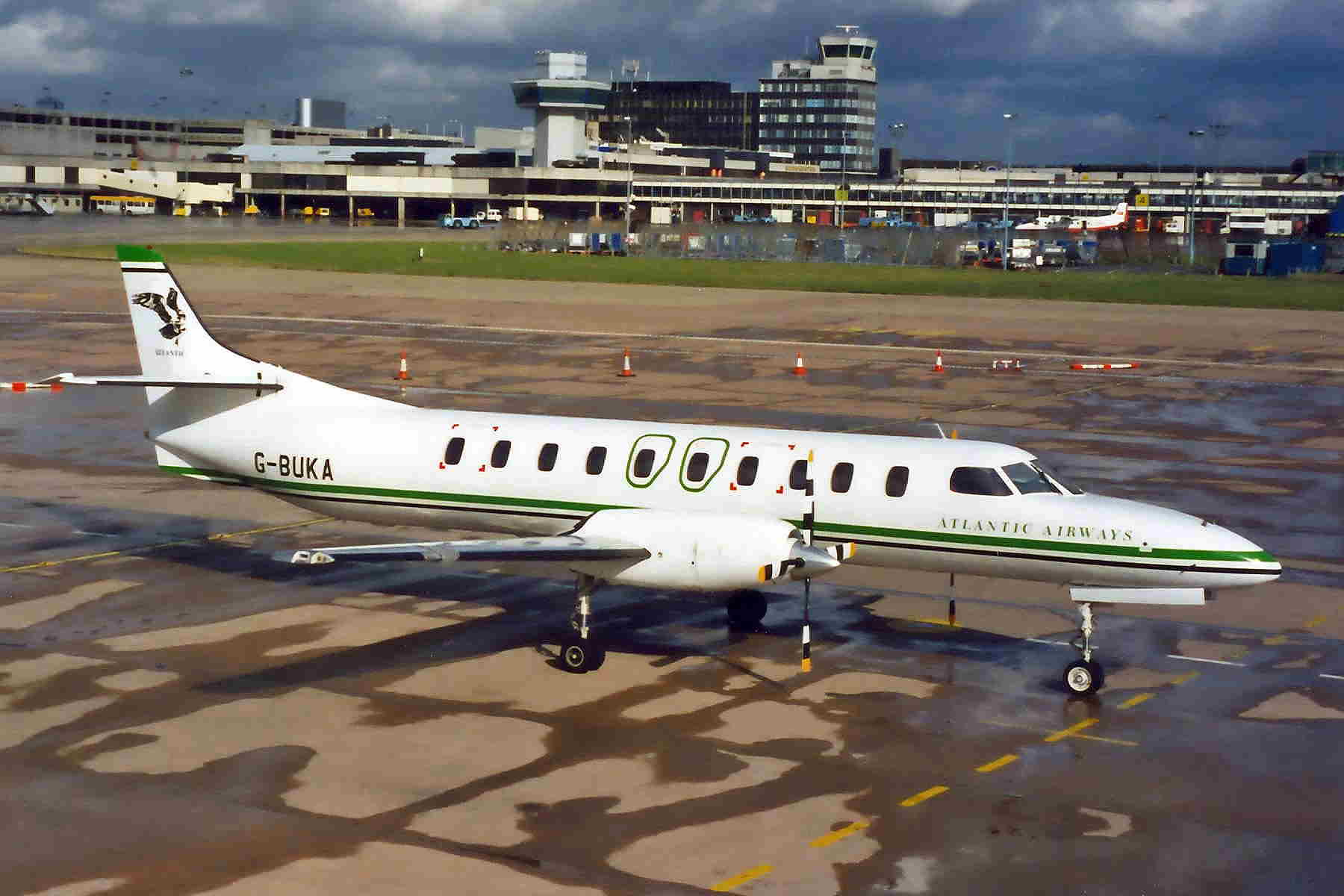
Swearingen SA-227AC with Atlantic Airways titles

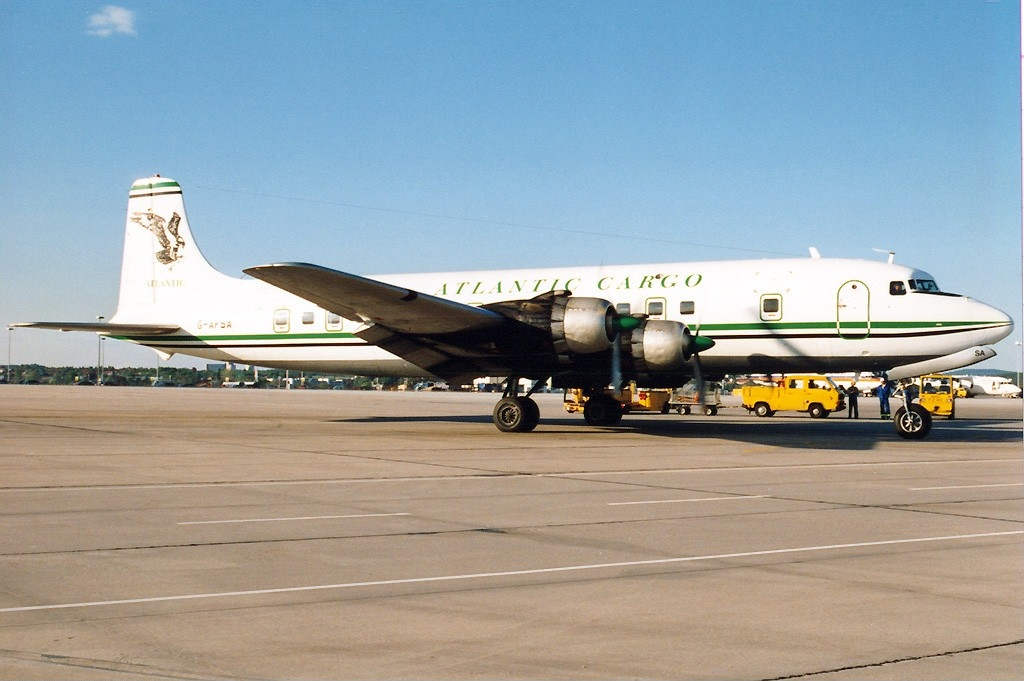
Douglas DC6 with Atlantic Cargo titles

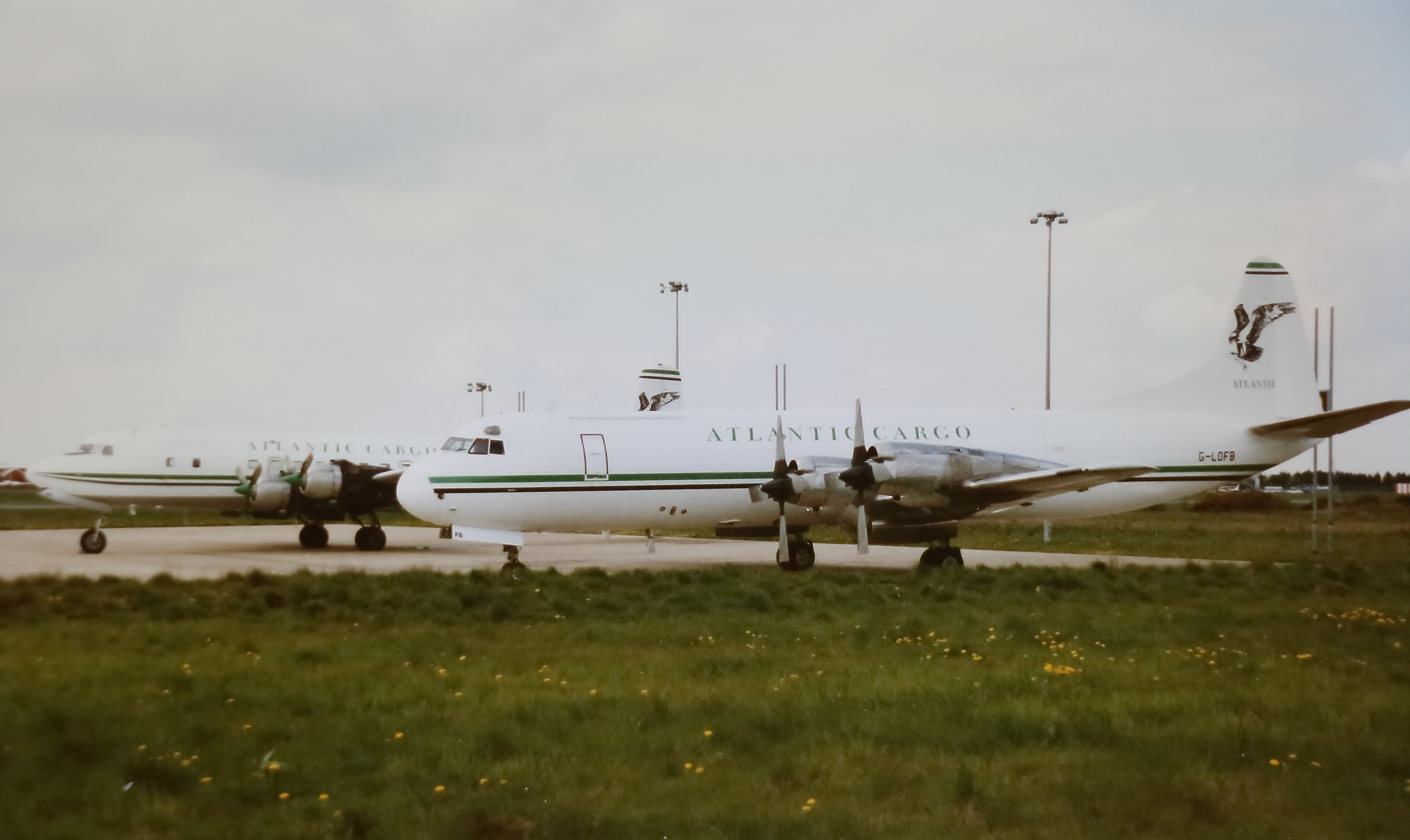
L.188 Electra with Atlantic Cargo titles

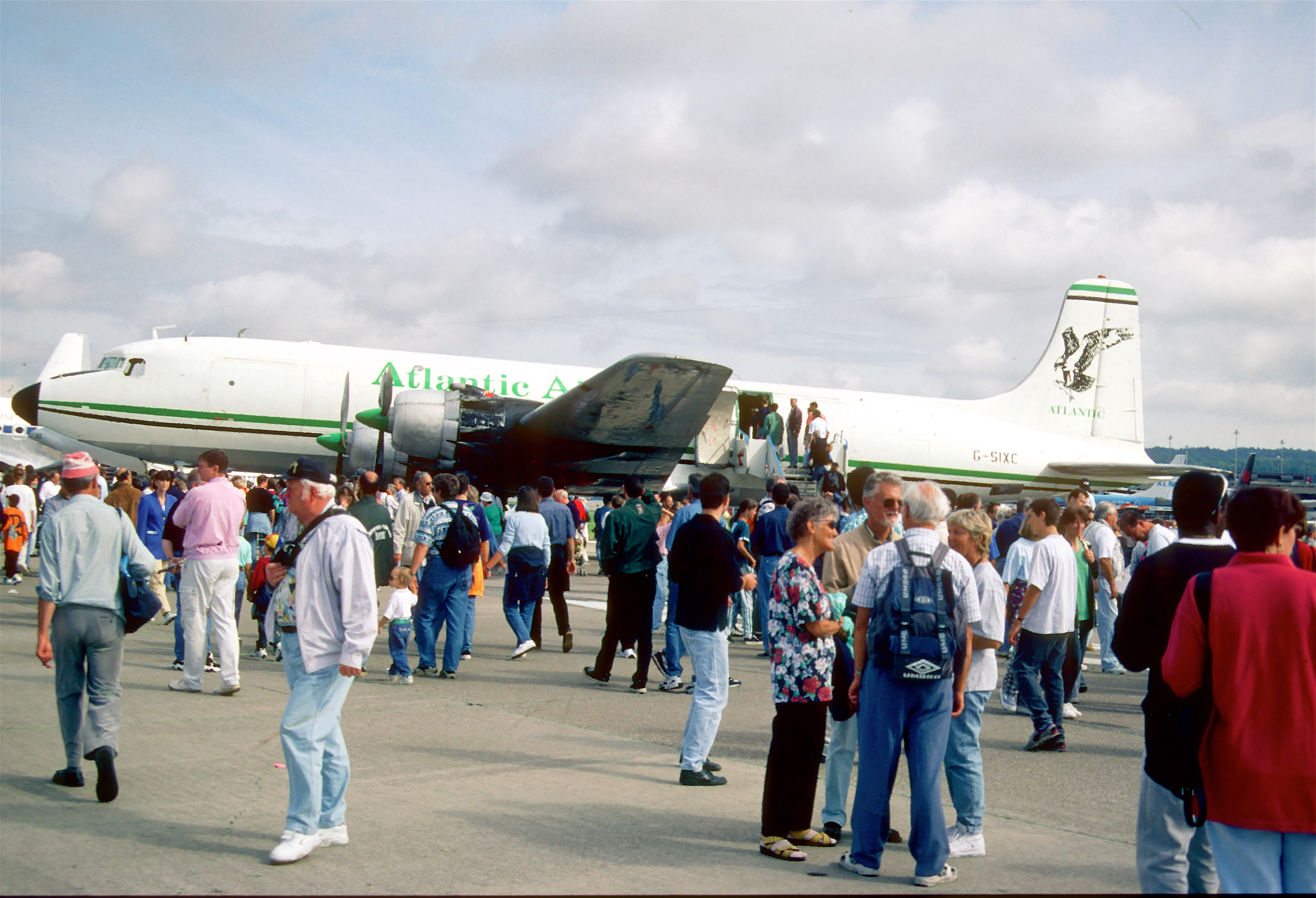
Douglas DC6 with Atlantic Airlines titles

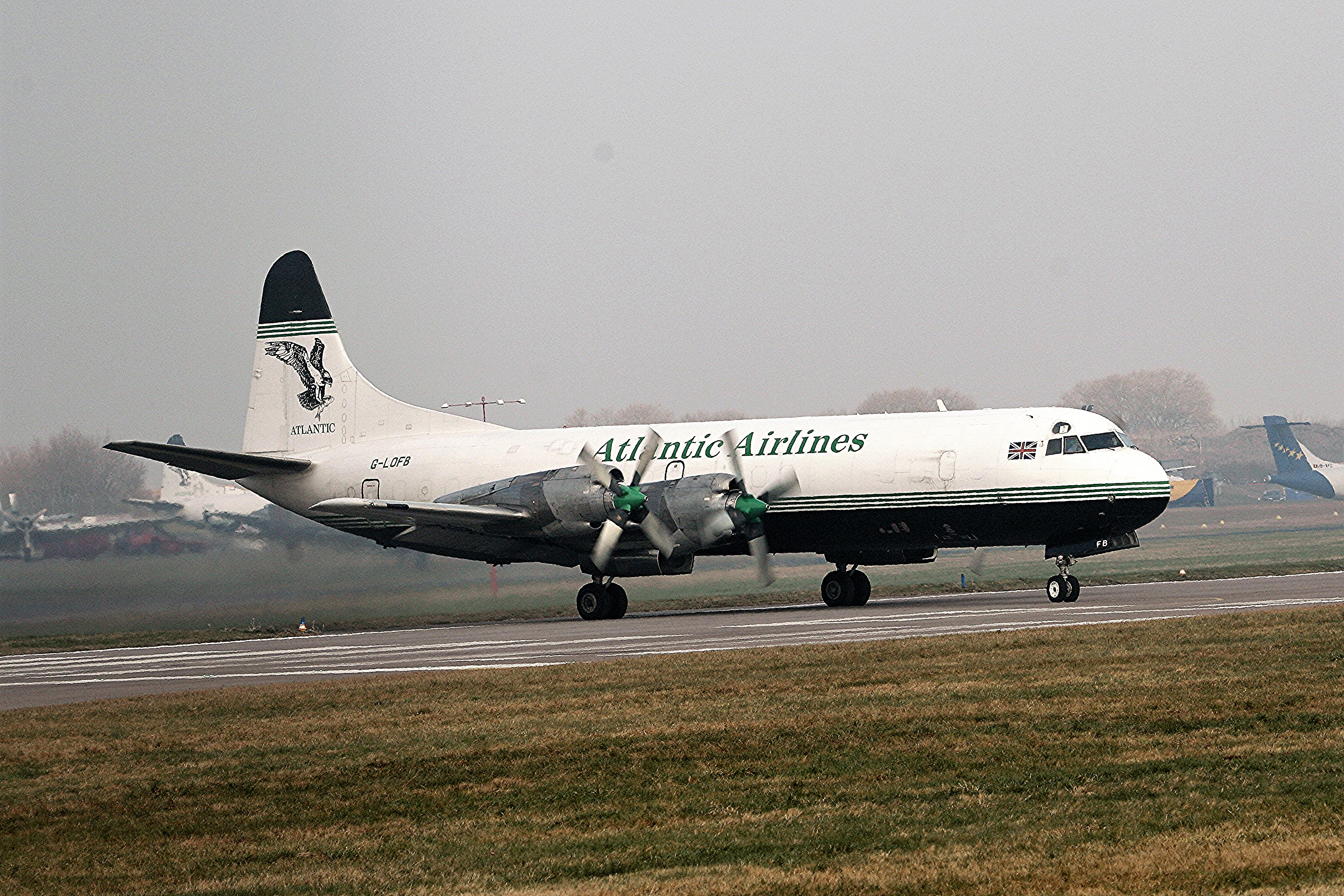
L.188 Electra with Atlantic Airlines titles

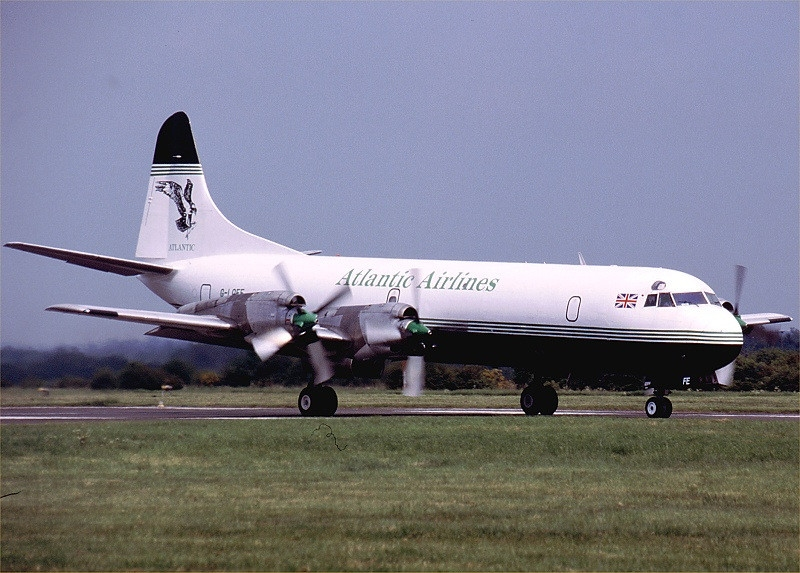
L.188 Electra cargo with Atlantic Airlines titles

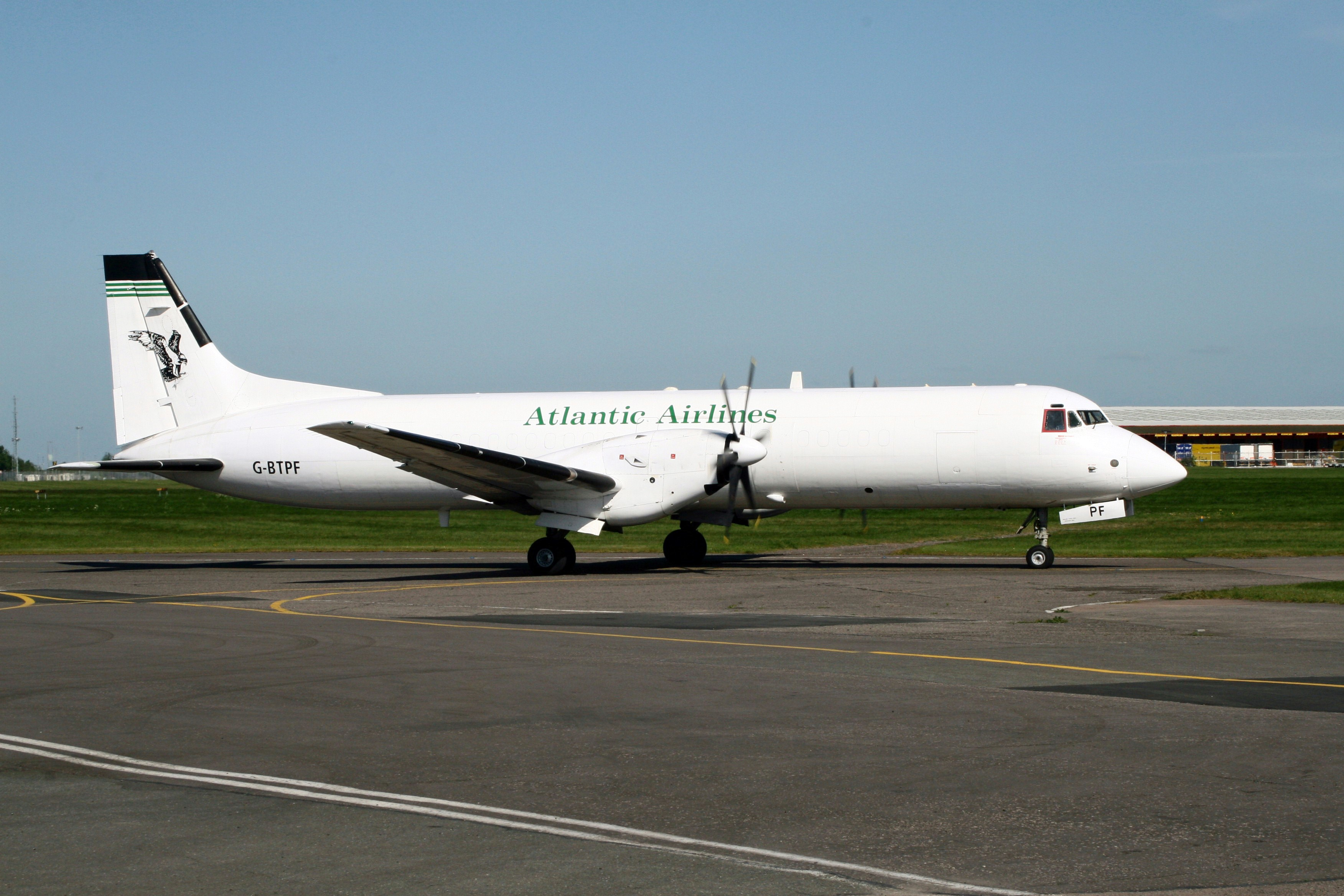
BAe ATP with Atlantic Airlines titles

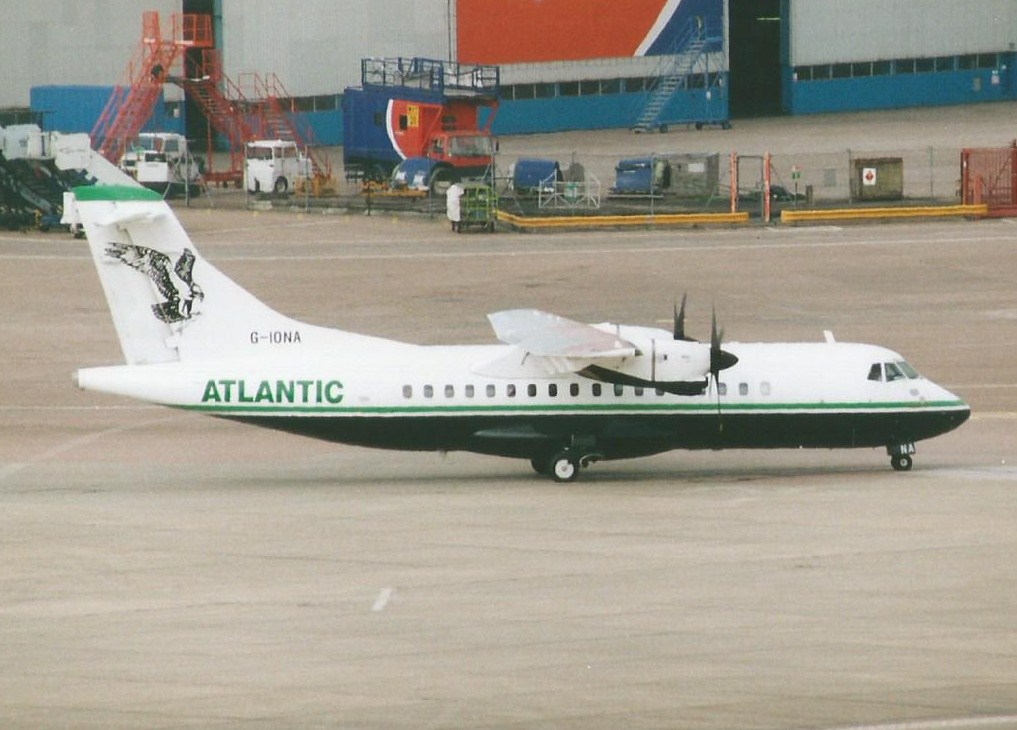
ATR42 with Atlantic Airlines titles

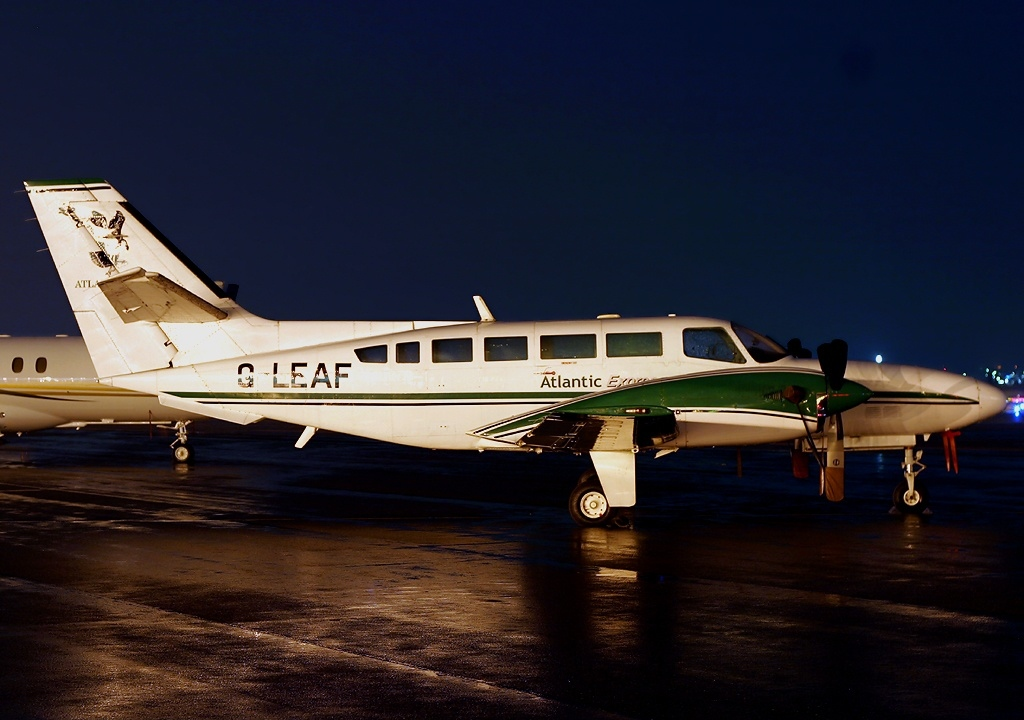
Cessna F406 Caravan II with Atlantic Express titles

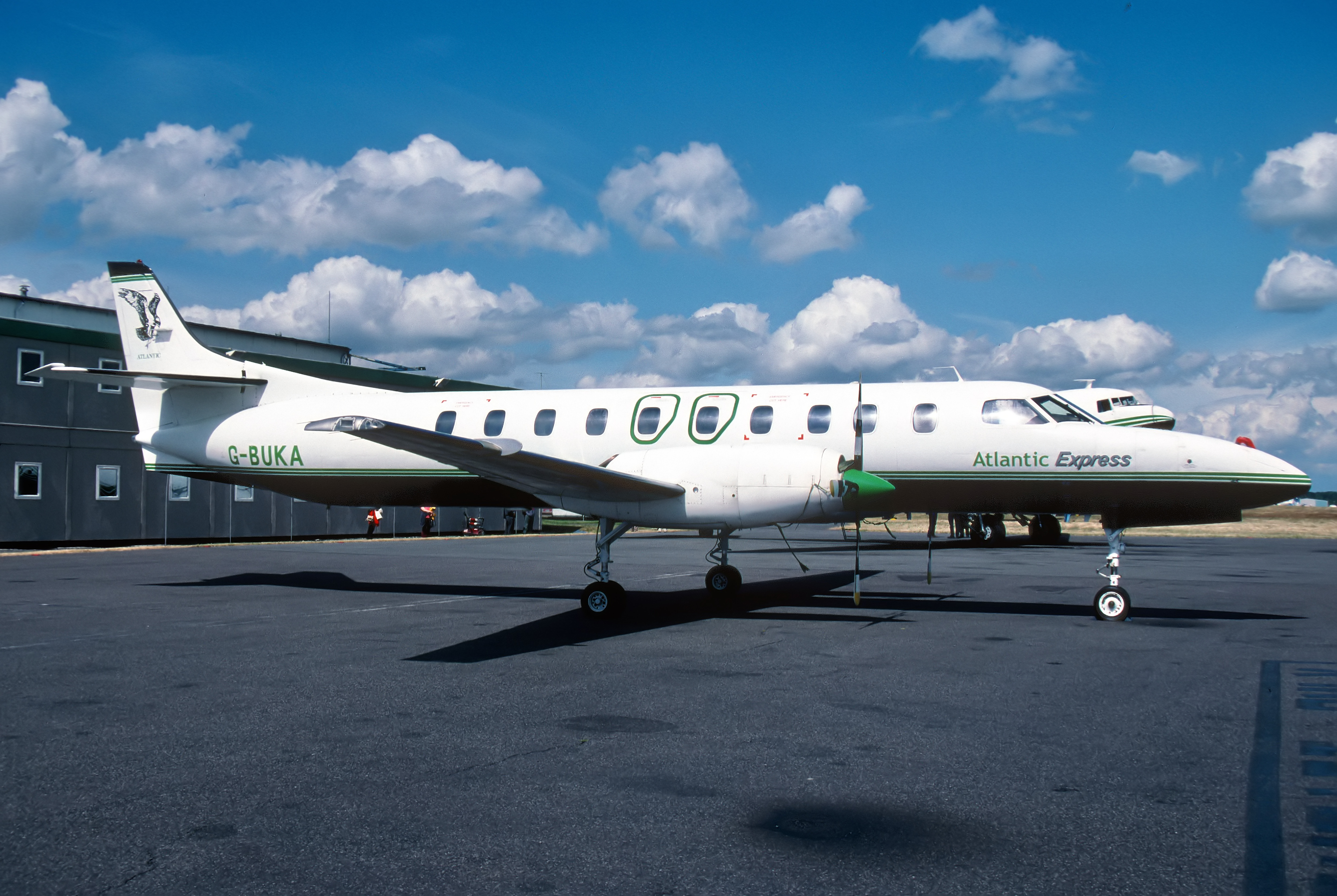
Swearingen SA-227AC Metro III with Atlantic Express titles

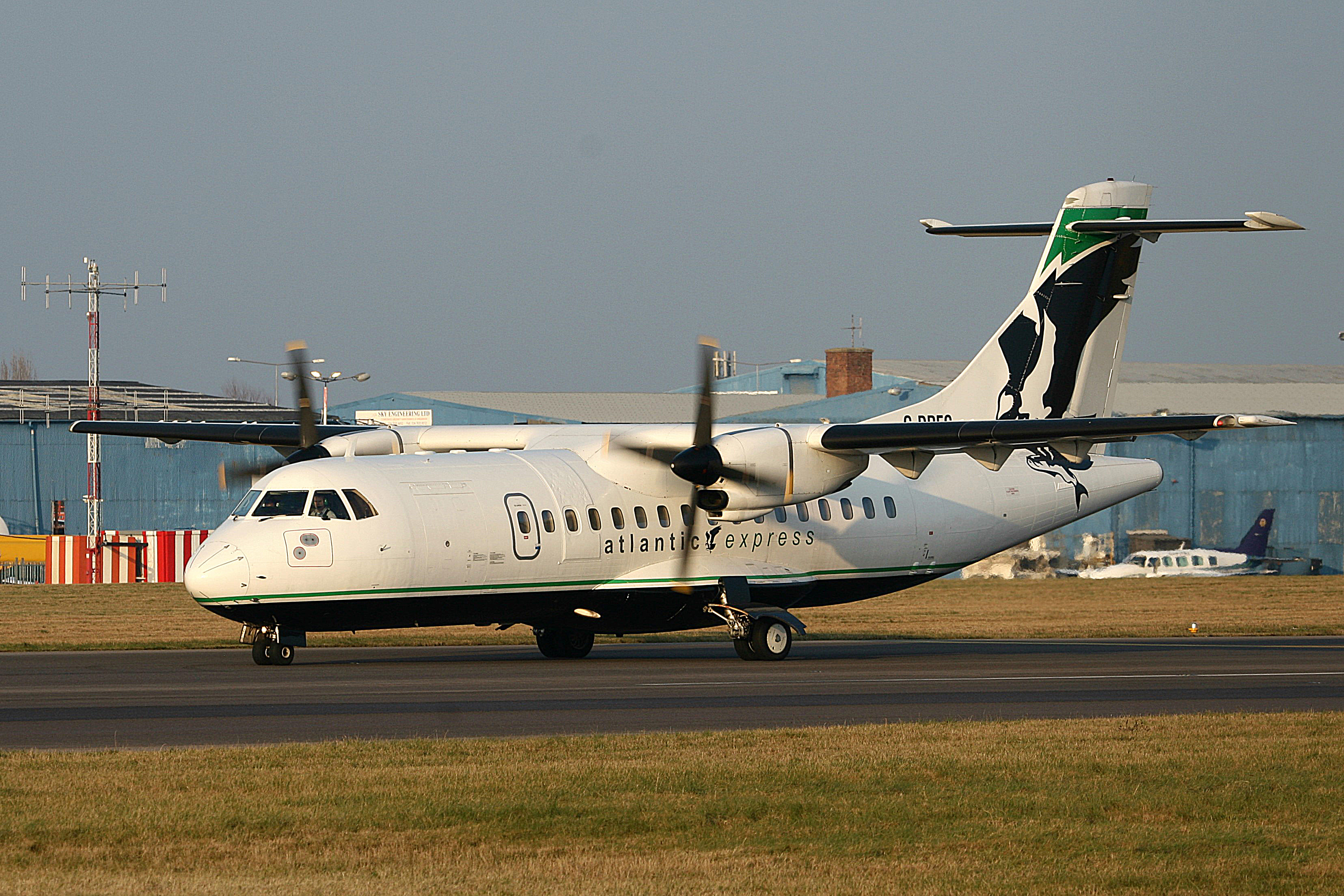
ATR42 with Atlantic Express titles

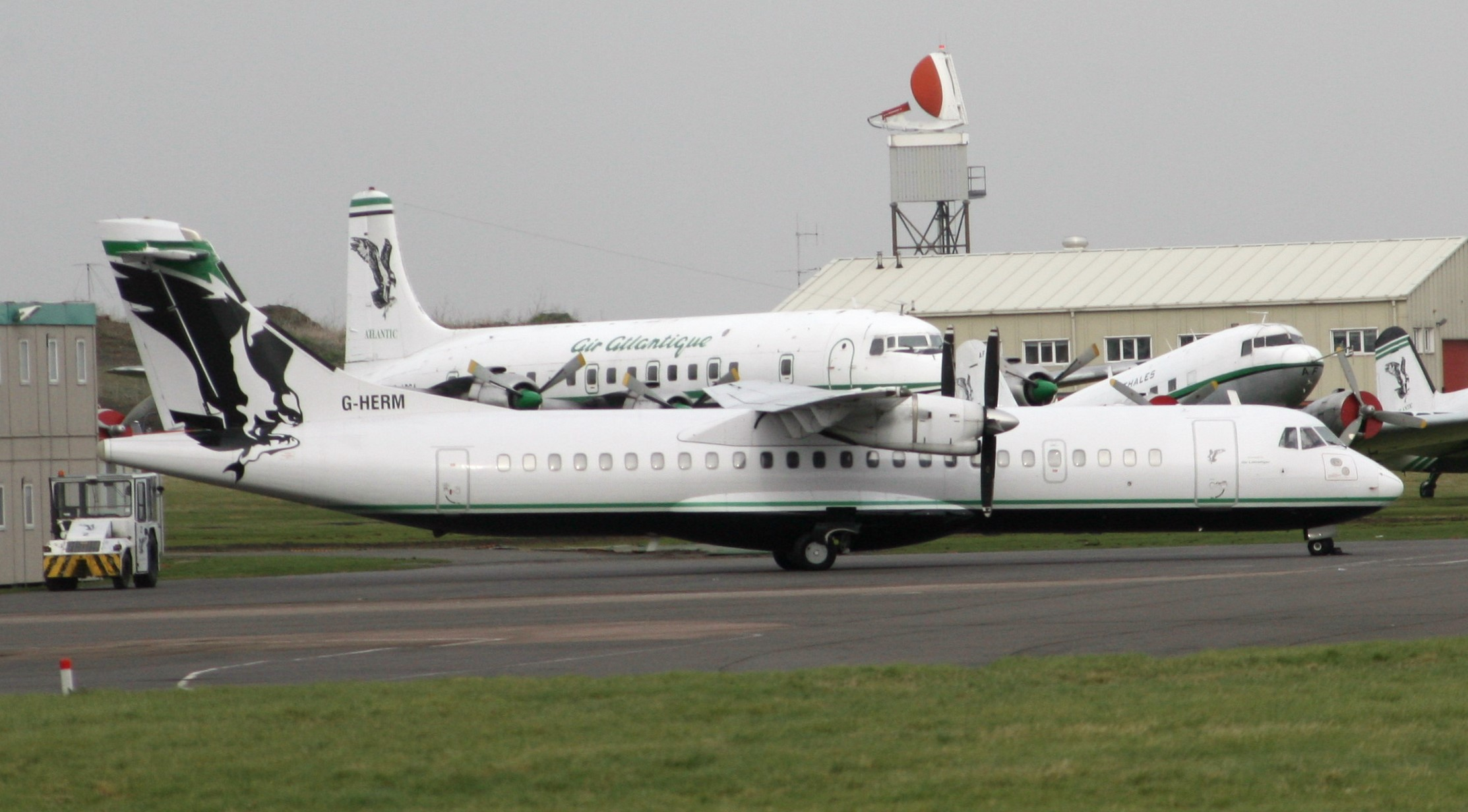
ATR72 operating for Atlantic Express

== See also ==
- RVL Aviation
- Atlantic Airlines
- Highland Airways
- List of defunct airlines of the United Kingdom
