= Arc en Ciel Airlines =

Senegalese airline

Arc en Ciel Airlines is a Senegalese airline.

Founded in 1996 as Arc en Ciel Aviation, the company changed its name to Arc en Ciel Airlines in 2020.

Based in Senegal, at Dakar Yoff's Léopold-Sédar-Senghor airport, the company mainly offers charter flights and medical evacuation services.

By 2024, its fleet includes 5 aircraft and the airline is BARS(Basic Aviation Risk Standard) approved.

== History ==
Arc en Ciel Airlines was founded in 1996 under the name Arc en Ciel Aviation. That same year, the company set up a maintenance workshop to provide this service on its fleet.

The company's name is a tribute to the Couzinet Arc en Ciel aircraft flown by Jean Mermoz across the South Atlantic from Saint Louis du Sénégal in 1933.

The company was taken over in 2004 by Michel Jacquot, a professional pilot and experienced business aviation manager.

In the summer of 2019, the French AVICO Group became the majority shareholder with the ambition of supporting the company's development.

In March 2020, the company changed its name to Arc en Ciel Airlines and the Namibian company Westair Aviation acquired a stake in Arc en Ciel Airlines alongside the Avico Group.

A first Beechcraft 1900D enters service in early 2022, joined by a Cessna F406 in the same year.

The airline has been BARS approved by Flight Safety Foundation in 2024.

== Activity ==
Arc en Ciel Airlines specializes in on-demand flights, business aviation, urgent freight and medical evacuations in West Africa and to Southern Europe.

Its offices and workshops are located at the Léopold-Sédar-Senghor (DKR) international airport in Dakar Yoff. The company also has a base at Blaise-Diagne International Airport (DSS).

The company's geographical position and the characteristics of its fleet also make Arc en Ciel Airlines attractive to mining and oil companies involved in major projects in the region.

== Fleet ==
The Arc en Ciel Airlines fleet includes 6 aircraft:

Aircraft	Number	Seat configuration	Range	Stretcher equipped
Beechcraft 1900D	1	18	1 000 NM	Yes
C208B Grand Caravan	1	12	1 200 NM	Yes
Reims-Cessna F406	1	12	1250 NM	Yes
PA 23 - Aztec 250	1	6	1 100 NM	No
PA 32 - Saratoga	1	5	1 000 NM	Yes
