= RVL Aviation =

UK aerial survey and charter airline

IATA	ICAO	Call sign
-	REV	ENDURANCE
- Founded: 2007
- AOC #: 540
- Fleet size: 13
- Parent company: RVL Group
- Headquarters: East Midlands Airport, United Kingdom
- Key people: Dave Connor, CEO
- Website: RVL Group

RVL Aviation is a British specialist charter airline, part of the RVL Group, based at East Midlands Airport in the United Kingdom. It provides a range of aviation services such as ad hoc passenger and cargo charter flights, aerial surveillance and survey flights and the aerial spraying of pollution dispersants.

RVL Aviation holds a United Kingdom Civil Aviation Authority Type A Operating Licence which permits it to carry passengers, cargo and mail on aircraft with 20 or more seats.

== History ==
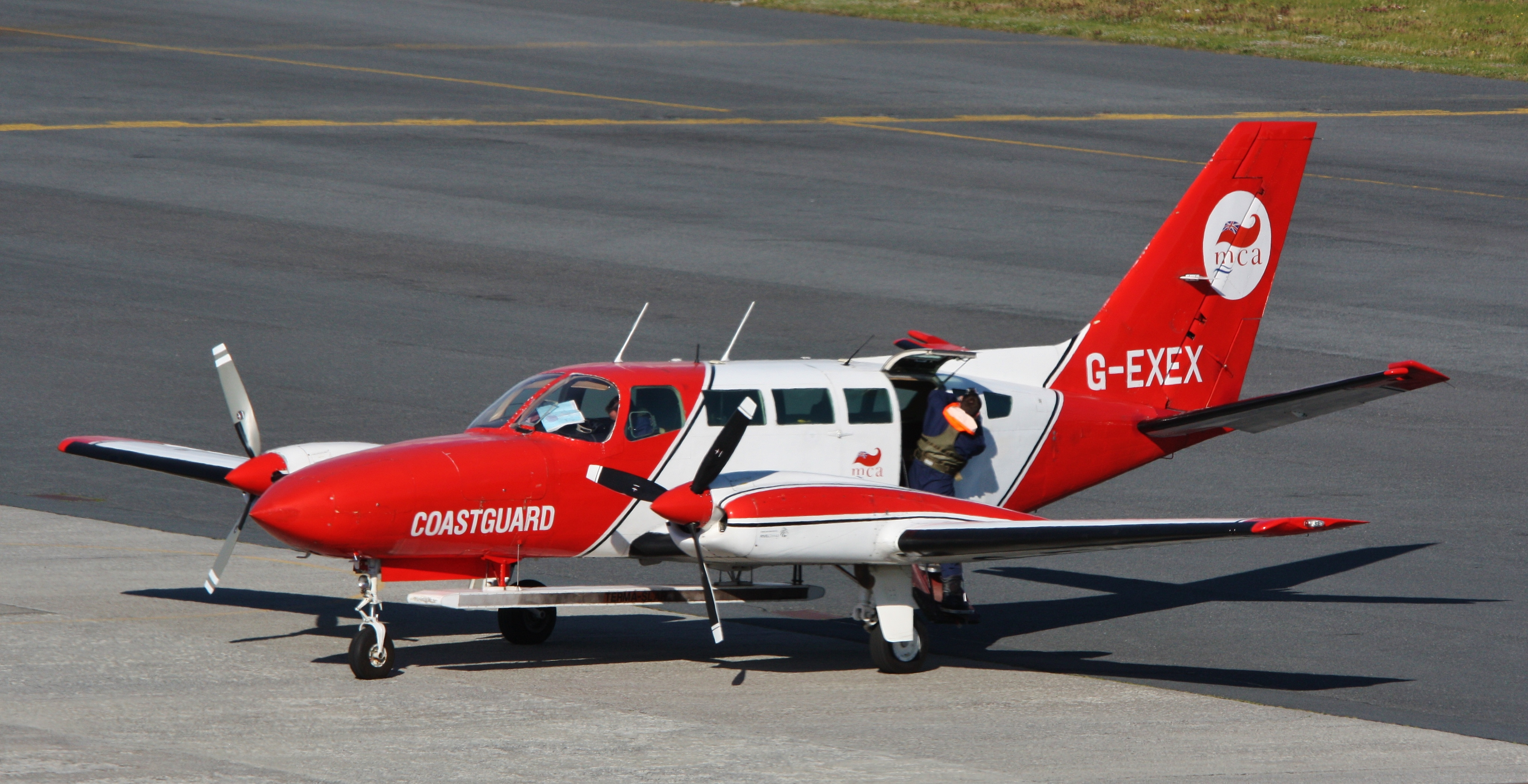
An RVL Aviation Cessna 404 at Sumburgh Airport. The aircraft operated for the Maritime and Coastguard Agency.

RVL Aviation was formed in 2007 after its predecessor, Air Atlantique, was dissolved into two separate businesses, West Atlantic UK and RVL Aviation. The company re-located from Coventry Airport to East Midlands Airport in 2010 upon the completion of its purpose-built hangar facility.

RVL Aviation operates ad hoc passenger and cargo charter flights on behalf of both private and public sector clients. This includes Jersey-based air taxi Isle-Fly, which uses two of RVL Aviation's Beechcraft King Airs for its flights.

RVL Aviation also operates aerial surveillance and survey flights for a variety of clients including the Environment Agency and the Maritime and Coastguard Agency (MCA). RVL Aviation's operations for the MCA includes aerial surveillance, aerial search and rescue support, and providing aircraft for the aerial spraying of pollution dispersants on oil spills. The aerial spraying of pollution dispersants was originally performed using a fleet of Douglas DC-3 aircraft; however, RVL Aviation now uses a Boeing 737-400 from West Atlantic UK for this task in a joint operation with the latter.

== Fleet ==
=== Current fleet ===
As of January 2026, the RVL Aviation fleet consists of the following aircraft:

- 5 x Beechcraft King Air
- 6 x Reims-Cessna F406

=== Former fleet ===
RVL Aviation previously operated the following aircraft:

- 1 x Britten Norman Islander
- 4 x Cessna 310
- 1 x Cessna 402
- 4 x Cessna 404
- 2 x Partenavia P.68
- 2 x Saab 340B
