= Reims-Cessna F406 Caravan II =

Utility aircraft

F406 Caravan II
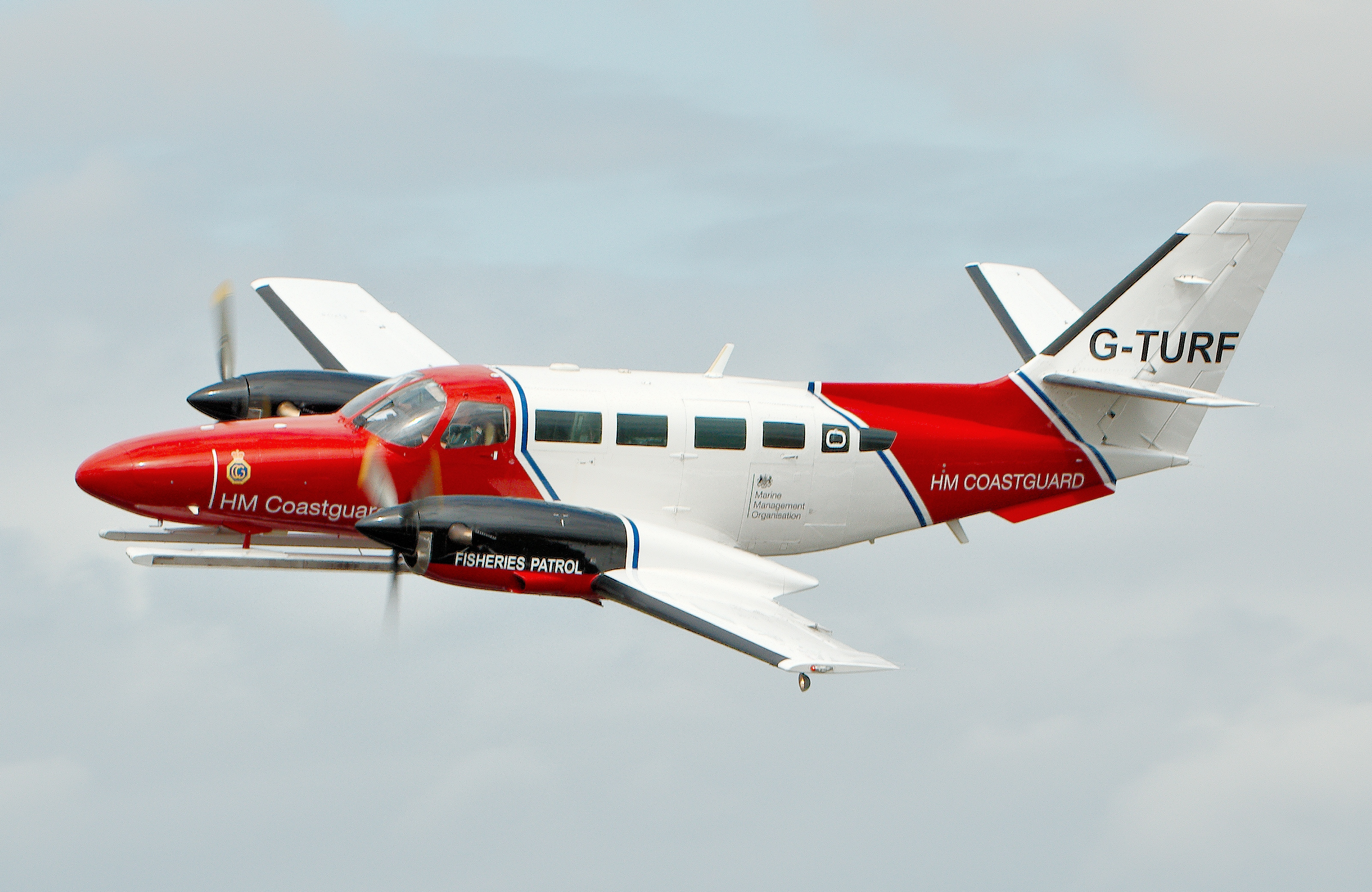
- A Cessna F406 from HM Coastguard

General information
- Type: Twin-engined utility
- National origin: France; United States
- Manufacturer: Reims Aviation
- Status: In service, production to recommence
- Primary users: French DGDDI Republic of Korea Navy
- Number built: 99 (Note: One prototype and 98 production aircraft)

History
- Manufactured: 1983–2013
- First flight: 22 September 1983
- Developed from: Cessna 404 Titan

The Reims-Cessna F406 Caravan II is a turboprop twin engine utility aircraft manufactured and designed by Reims Aviation in cooperation with Cessna.

== Design and development ==
The F406 Caravan II is a twin turboprop engined, fourteen-seat low-wing monoplane of conventional aluminium (airframe) and steel (engine internal parts, exhaust, landing gear) construction. It is a development of the Cessna 404 Titan with two Pratt & Whitney PT6A turboprop engines. The aircraft first flew on 22 September 1983 and was produced by Reims Aviation until the company's 2013 demise. The F406 is aimed at passenger and small cargo transport as well as civilian and military surveillance. For extra cargo capacity, a cargo pod can be fitted to the belly of the aircraft.

Though the F406 is more expensive to operate than single-engine aircraft of the same passenger capacity such as the Cessna 208 Caravan, having two engines made it comply with European regulations regarding commercial operations, which for a long time only allowed multi-engine aircraft for commercial instrument flight.

In March 2014, Reims Aviation was acquired by Chinese-owned Continental Motors Inc and renamed ASI Aviation. Two remaining incomplete airframes were finished in France before a shift to Mobile, Alabama with new avionics, electrical, and hydraulic systems; a new autopilot; and an engine choice of current P&WC PT6A-135 or pistons : Continental GTSIO-520 and/or Continental CD-310 diesel. The Type Certificate transferred but only had approval to produce spare parts and not the whole aircraft.

== Operators ==
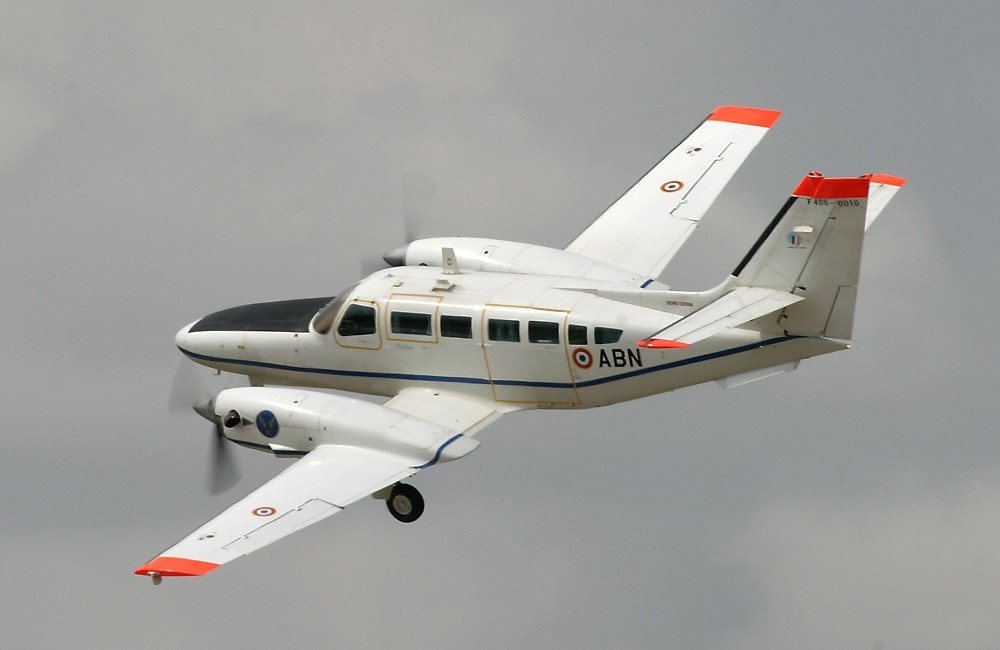
A Cessna F406 of the French Army.

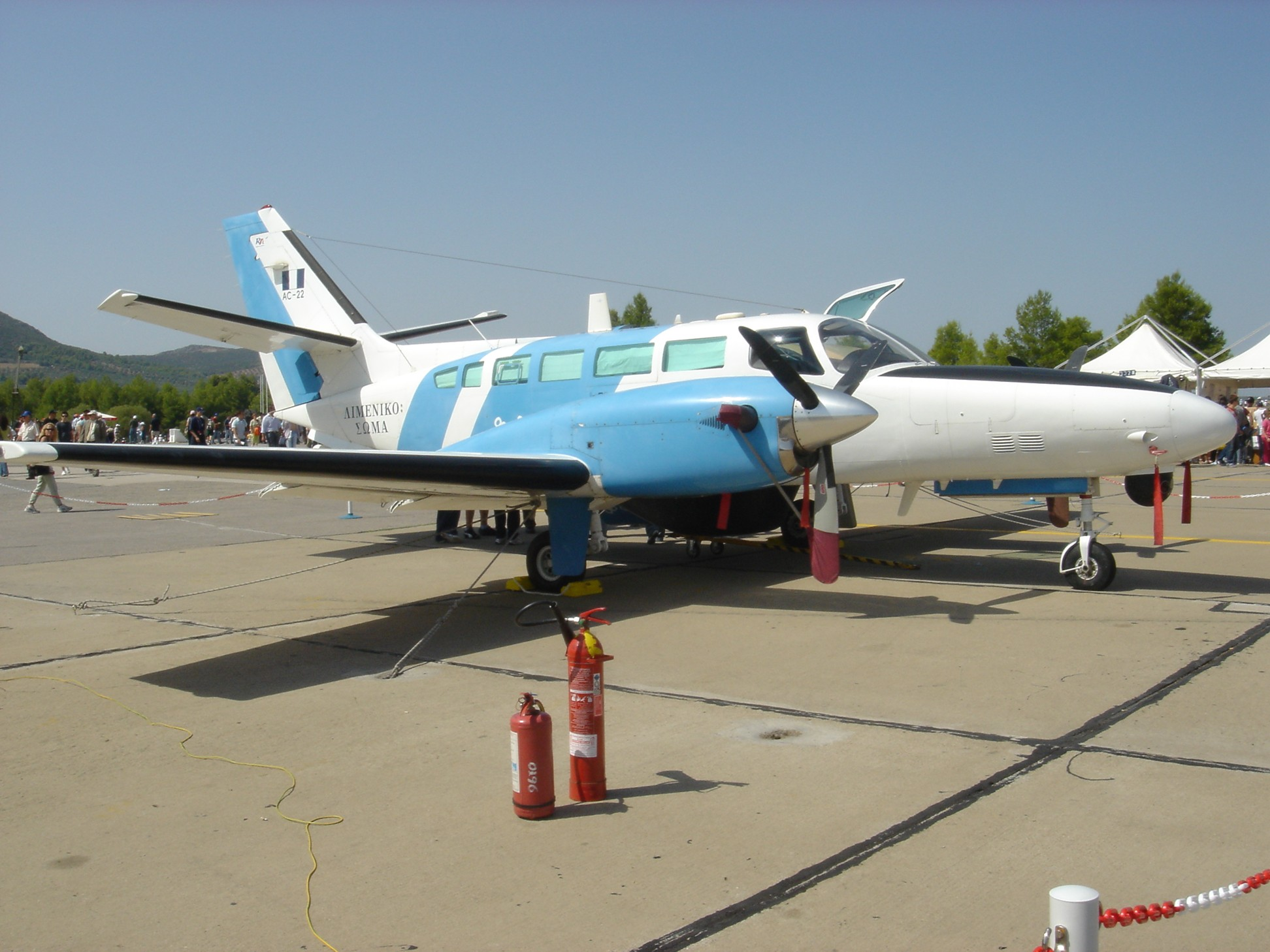
A Cessna F406 of the Hellenic Coast Guard.

Australia

- Aerologistics
- Australian Customs and Border Protection Service

France

- Air Saint-Pierre
- French Army

Germany

- Air-Taxi Europe
- Technische Universität Braunschweig

Greece

- Hellenic Coast Guard

Namibia

- Namibian Fisheries and Marine Resources
- Westair Aviation

Republic of Korea

- Republic of Korea Navy

Senegal

- Arc en Ciel Airlines

United Kingdom

- RVL Aviation

== Accidents and incidents ==
- On August 31, 1993, a Reims-Cessna F406 (registration F-GJLH) registered to J.G. Abdi crashed at Strasbourg Airport (Alsace). The aircraft was destroyed.
- 3 November 2001 – A Reims-Cessna F406 crashed shortly after takeoff from runway 03R at O. R. Tambo International Airport, killing all three occupants. The aircraft did not have a valid certificate of airworthiness at the time of the incident.

== Specifications ==
Data from Jane's All the World's Aircraft 1988–89

General characteristics

- Crew: One
- Capacity: 12 passengers
- Length: 11.89 m (39 ft 0 in)
- Wingspan: 15.09 m (49 ft 6 in)
- Height: 4.01 m (13 ft 2 in)
- Wing area: 23.48 m^{2} (253 sq ft)
- Empty weight: 2,283 kg (5,033 lb)
- Max takeoff weight: 4,246–4,700 kg (9,360–10,361 lb)
- Powerplant: 2 × Pratt & Whitney Canada PT6A-112 turboprop , 373 kW (500 hp) each

Performance

- Maximum speed: 424 km/h (263 mph, 229 kn) (Note: Indicated Air Speed.)
- Cruise speed: 388 km/h (241 mph, 209 kn)
- Range: 2,135 km (1,327 mi, 1,153 nmi) (Note: Max cruise, 45 min reserves)
- Service ceiling: 9,145 m (30,000 ft)
- Rate of climb: 9.4 m/s (1,850 ft/min)

== See also ==
- Cessna 208 Caravan

Related development

- Cessna 404 Titan
- Cessna 441 Conquest II

Aircraft of comparable role, configuration, and era

- Beechcraft Model 99
- Dornier 228

== References and notes ==
- Hoyle, Craig. "World Air Forces Directory". Flight International, 8–14 December 2015, Vol. 188, No. 5517. pp. 26–53.
- Taylor, John W.R. Jane's All The World's Aircraft 1988–89. Coulsdon, UK:Jane's Defence Data, 1988. ISBN 0 7106-0867-5.
