= 1964 in aviation =

This is a list of aviation-related events from 1964.

== Events ==
- Chilean President Jorge Alessandri grants the Chilean Navy the authority to operate all types of aircraft without restriction. It is the first time that the navy has administrative control of all naval aircraft since 1930.

=== January ===
- January 4 – Pope Paul VI becomes the first pope to use a commercial airliner for an official visit. He flies from Leonardo da Vinci Rome Fiumicino Airport in Fiumicino, Italy, to Marka International Airport in Amman, Jordan, in a chartered Alitalia Douglas DC-8 marked with the Vatican colors, white and yellow, and the papal coat of arms.
- January 13 – A United States Air Force B-52D Stratofortress carrying two Mark 53 nuclear bombs loses its vertical stabilizer in turbulence during a winter storm and crashes on Savage Mountain near Barton, Maryland. Only two of the five crewmen survive. The bombs are recovered two days later.
- January 22 – In its first public violation of the 1959 requirement for all aircraft operating from the aircraft carrier Minas Gerais to belong to the Brazilian Air Force, the Brazilian Navy steams Minas Gerais into Guanabara Bay at Rio de Janeiro with four navy T-28 Trojan trainers on her flight deck.
- January 28 – A Soviet MiG-19 shoots down a T-39 Sabreliner which had accidentally entered East German airspace, killing all three men aboard the T-39.

=== February ===
- February 3
  - The North Vietnamese Air Force establishes its first jet fighter unit, Fighter Regiment No. 921, equipped with MiG-17s. North Vietnamese jet fighter units will be based in the People's Republic of China until August while their pilots undergo training.
  - A Turkish Airlines Douglas C-47A-5-DK Skytrain on a cargo flight crashes in Ankara Province, Turkey, while on approach to Esenboğa Airport in Ankara, killing the entire crew of three.
- February 7 – The Canadian Golden Hawks aerobatic team is disbanded.
- February 15
  - The North Vietnamese Air Force scores its first aerial victory against an American aircraft when a North Vietnamese T-28 Trojan armed trainer shoots down a C-123 Provider transport plane.
  - American professional baseball player Ken Hubbs of the Chicago Cubs and his passenger are killed when the Cessna 172D Skyhawk he is piloting crashes in adverse weather near Provo, Utah.
- February 19 – French troops are airlifted to Gabon to put down a coup by the army.
- February 25 – Eastern Air Lines Flight 304, a Douglas DC-8, crashes into Lake Pontchartrain 20 miles (32 km) northeast of New Orleans, nine minutes after taking off from New Orleans International Airport, killing all 58 people on board. Among the dead is the American singer and actor Kenneth Spencer.
- February 28 – A U.S. Navy helicopter of Utility Helicopter Squadron 1 (HU-1) lands on the deck of the combat stores ship USS Mars (AFS-1), beginning the true incorporation of helicopters into the fleet's logistic support system after experiments dating back to 1959.
- February 29 – U.S. President Lyndon B. Johnson reveals the existence of the CIA's Lockheed A-12 reconnaissance aircraft

=== March ===
- Four men are photographed forming a four-person star formation while parachuting over Arvin, California. It is the first documented example of formation skydiving.
- March 5 – Somali Airlines is founded as the national airline of Somalia. It will begin flight operations in July.
- March 19 – American Jerrie Mock departs Columbus, Ohio, in the Cessna 180 Spirit of Columbus (registration N1538C), nicknamed "Charlie", in an attempt to become the first woman to fly around the world.

=== April ===
- USS Kitty Hawk (CVA-63) becomes the first aircraft carrier assigned to Point Yankee, the U.S. Navy's aircraft carrier operating area in the Gulf of Tonkin off North Vietnam. Point Yankee will become unofficially but universally known as "Yankee Station" and will remain in use until August 1973.
- Braniff Airways makes deposits on two Boeing Supersonic Transports (SSTs). Thanks to the cancellation of the SST program in 1971, it will never take delivery of the aircraft.
- Air Djibouti begins flight operations.

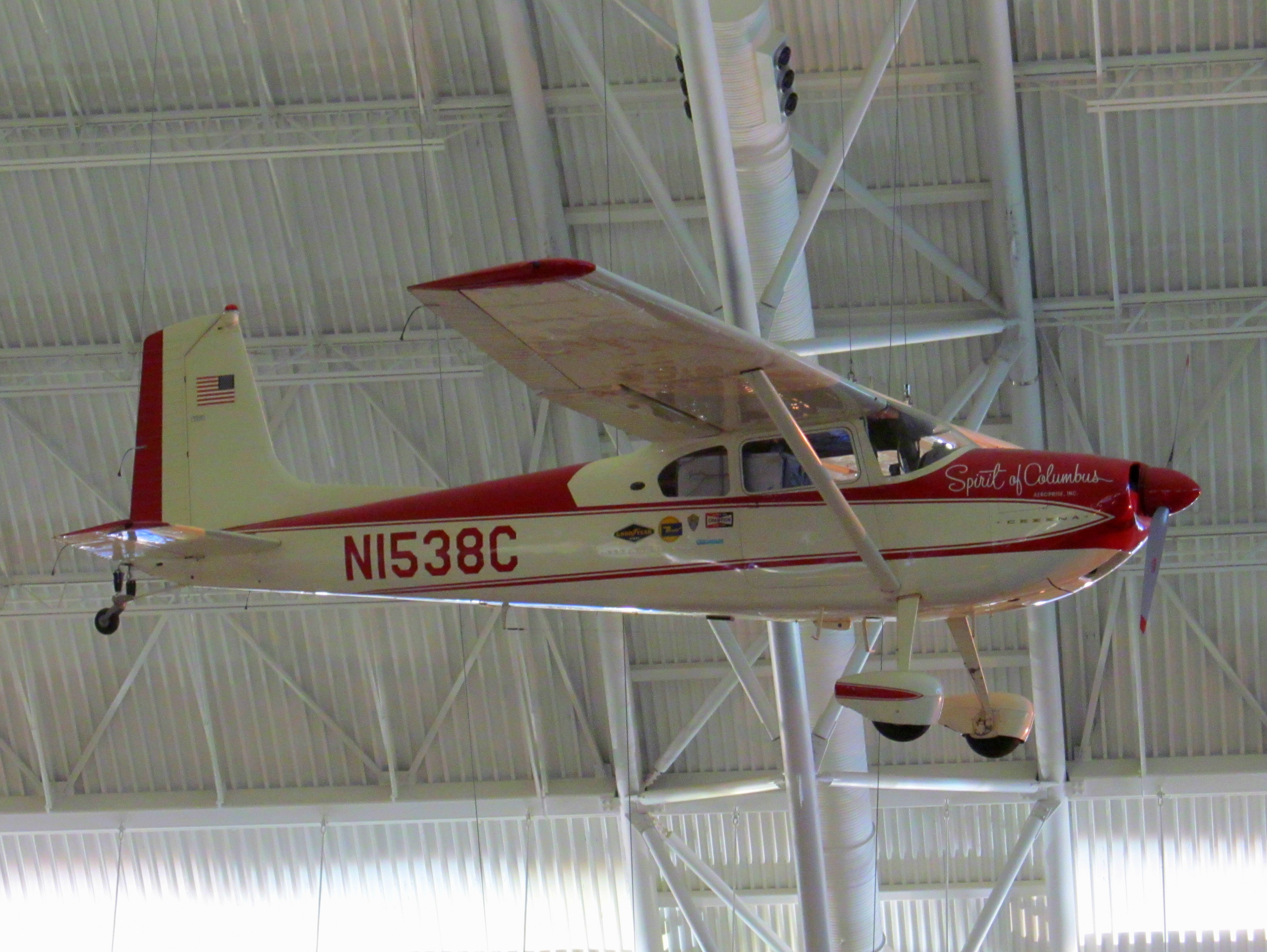
Jerrie Mock's Spirit of Columbus, which she piloted as the first woman to fly solo around the world, at the Steven F. Udvar-Hazy Center

- April 17
  - Middle East Airlines Flight 444, a Sud Aviation SE-210 Caravelle III, crashes into the Persian Gulf while on approach to Dhahran International Airport in Dhahran, Saudi Arabia, killing all 49 people on board. It is the deadliest aviation accident in Saudi Arabian history at the time.
  - American Jerrie Mock arrives in Columbus, Ohio, in the Cessna 180 Spirit of Columbus (registration N1538C), nicknamed "Charlie", completing a solo round-the-world flight and becoming the first woman to fly around the world. The journey has taken 29 1/2 days, required 21 stopovers, and covered almost 22,860 miles (36,790 km). During the flight, Mock has become the first woman to fly solo across the Pacific Ocean from west to east and the first woman to fly a single-engine plane in either direction across the Pacific.
  - The U.S. Air Force completes Operation Helping Hand, an airlift begun on March 28 that has brought 1,850 short tons (1,678 metric tons) of relief equipment and supplies to Anchorage, Alaska, in the aftermath of a massive earthquake there.
- April 21 – A Middle East Airlines Vickers 754D Viscount is damaged beyond economical repair while taxiing at El Arish, Egypt, when the taxiway collapses beneath it, severely damaging its fuselage, engines, and propellers.

=== May ===
- United States Air Force and United States Navy aircraft begin Operation Yankee Team reconnaissance flights over Laos.
- The U.S. Joint Chiefs of Staff assign search-and-rescue responsibilities in Southeast Asia to the U.S. Air Force.
- May 2 – A North Vietnamese frogman sinks the U.S. Navy aviation transport USNS Card (T-AKV-40) – formerly the escort aircraft carrier USS Card (CVE-11) – pierside while she unloads helicopters at Saigon, South Vietnam. She soon is refloated and repaired.
- May 7 – Francisco Paula Gonzales shoots both the pilot and copilot of Pacific Air Lines Flight 773, a Fairchild F27A Friendship, before turning the gun on himself, causing the plane to crash near San Ramon, California. All 44 aboard are killed. The crash is likely the first instance in the United States of an airliner's pilots being shot by a passenger as part of a mass murder/suicide.
- May 9 – An F-105B Thunderchief (serial number 57-5801) operated by the U.S. Air Force Air Demonstration Squadron (the Thunderbirds) disintegrates during a six-G tactical pitch-up for landing after an air display at Hamilton Air Force Base, California, killing its pilot. The accident prompts the U.S. Air Force to ground all F-105s and retrofit them with a structural brace. The Thunderbirds revert to using the F-100 Super Sabre and never fly another show in F-105s.
- May 11 –
  - Jackie Cochran sets a new women's airspeed record of 1,429 mph (2,300 km/h) in an F-104 Starfighter.
  - North American Aviation rolls out the United States Air Force′s first XB-70A Valkyrie – named Air Vehicle 1 (AV-1) – at Palmdale, California.
- May 21 – Pathet Lao antiaircraft artillery damages a U.S. Navy RF-8A Crusader photographic reconnaissance aircraft over Laos. The RF-8A, flown by Lieutenant Charles F. Klusmann, burns for 20 minutes in the air but lands safely aboard the aircraft carrier USS Kitty Hawk (CVA-63).

=== June ===
- The Indian Air Force's Aircraft Manufacturing Depot at Kanpur is incorporated as Aeronautics (India) Ltd. It later will become the Kanpur Division of Hindustan Aeronautics.
- Aero Trasporti Italiani (ATI), a subsidiary of Alitalia, begins flight operations. ATI takes over secondary domestic routes in Italy formerly operated by the Alitalia subsidiary Società Aerea Mediterranea (SAM).
- June 1
  - Flying a Lockheed F-104G Starfighter, Jacqueline "Jackie" Cochran sets a women's world speed record of 1,303.24 mph (2,098.62 km/h). The flight brings to an end a longstanding competition between Cochran and Jacqueline Auriol in which they broke many of one another's women's speed records.
  - The Kenyan Air Force is established.
  - Trans World Airlines begins Boeing 727 service.
- June 6
  - Over Laos, Pathet Lao antiaircraft artillery shoots down a U.S. Navy RF-8A Crusader photographic reconnaissance aircraft piloted by Lieutenant Charles F. Klusmann. It is the first U.S. Navy aircraft and first American fixed-wing aircraft lost over Indochina in the Vietnam War era.
  - Silver City Airways announces that it has airlifted its one millionth car between England and continental Europe.
- June 19
  - An Aero Commander 680 flying from Washington, D.C., with United States Senator Edward M. "Ted" Kennedy aboard as a passenger crashes in an apple orchard in Southampton, Massachusetts, while on final approach in bad weather to Barnes Municipal Airport in Westfield, Massachusetts. The crash kills the pilot and one of Kennedy's aides. Suffering a severe back injury, a punctured lung, broken ribs, and internal bleeding, Kennedy is pulled from the wreckage by U.S. Senator Birch Bayh. Kennedy will be hospitalized until December and suffer chronic back pain for the rest of his life as a result of his injuries.
  - The Portuguese airline Transportes Aéreos Portugueses (TAP) – the future TAP Portugal – carries its one millionth passenger, 18 years after beginning flight operations.
- June 20 – Civil Air Transport Flight B-908, a Curtiss C-46-CU run by the Taiwanese airline Civil Air Transport, crashes near the village of Shenkang in western Taiwan, killing all 57 people aboard. Among the dead are 20 Americans, one Briton, and members of the Malaysian delegation to the 11th Film Festival in Asia, including businessman Loke Wan Tho and his wife Mavis.
- June 22 – After making a preliminary flight from Los Angeles to Oakland, California, Henry Ohye takes off from Oakland bound for Tokyo, Japan, on a goodwill flight in the Piper PA-28 Cherokee Toku-Hana in an attempt to become the first Japanese American to make a solo flight across the Pacific Ocean. On the first leg of his flight, he lands at Honolulu, Hawaii, taking advantage of a tailwind to complete the flight in 13 hours 50 minutes, far under the 18 hours he had expected, and contemporary press reporting suggests that he has set an unofficial record time for a light airplane of the Cherokee's class.

=== July ===
- Somalia's national airline, Somali Airlines, begins flight operations, serving domestic routes in Somalia with a fleet of three Douglas DC-3s and two Cessna 180s.
- July 6 – U.S. Marine Corps UH-34D transport helicopters airlift a 93-man relief force during the Battle of Nam Dong in South Vietnam.
- July 7 – Henry Ohye arrives at Tokyo, Japan, completing a U.S-Japan goodwill flight from Oakland, California, in the Piper PA-28 Cherokee Toku-Hana and becoming the first Japanese American to make a solo flight across the Pacific Ocean. Since flying from Los Angeles to Oakland and then setting out across the Pacific, he has made stops at Honolulu, Midway Atoll, Wake Island, Guam, and Okinawa before reaching Tokyo. It is his first visit to Japan, and he delivers 17 messages to Japanese mayors from their cities' sister cities in California.
- July 9 – United Airlines Flight 823, a Vicker Viscount 745D, catches fire in flight and crashes two miles (3.2 km) northeast of Parrottsville, Tennessee, killing all 39 people on board. One of the passengers jumps from the burning plane through an escape door and is killed in the fall.
- July 24 – The existence of the SR-71 "Blackbird" is made public by US President Lyndon B. Johnson.
- July 31
  - A. H. Parker sets a new sailplane distance record of 1,000 km (621 mi) in a Sisu-1A.
  - Country music star Jim Reeves and his manager die in the crash of a Beechcraft Debonair Reeves is piloting near Brentwood, Tennessee.

=== August ===
- In Project Tailchaser, the United States Air Force tests the concept of a fixed-wing gunship, converting a Convair C-131B Samaritan to fire a single GAU-2/A Minigun at a downward angle out of the left side of the aircraft at ground targets. Tests of the gunship at Eglin Air Force Base, Florida, demonstrate that such an aircraft flying a pylon turn easily can hit a stationary area with great accuracy even when using only a primitive targeting system.
- August 2 – The Tonkin Gulf Incident occurs. U.S. Navy aircraft are involved in skirmishes in the Gulf of Tonkin. F-8 Crusaders sink a North Vietnamese torpedo boat.
- August 5 – In Operation Pierce Arrow, U.S. Navy aircraft from the attack aircraft carriers USS Ticonderoga (CVA-14) and USS Constellation (CVA-64) attack North Vietnamese torpedo boat bases, spearheading direct U.S. involvement in the Vietnam War. They are the first bombing raids launched from Yankee Station.
- August 6 – The first North Vietnamese Air Force jet fighter unit, Fighter Regiment No. 921 (the "Red Star Squadron"), arrives in North Vietnam after training in the People's Republic of China, bringing 36 MiG-17 and MiG-19 fighters to Phúc Yên Air Base near Hanoi.
- August 7
  - The United States Congress passes the Tonkin Gulf Resolution, authorizing President Lyndon B. Johnson to use conventional military force in Southeast Asia.
  - American aircraft begin photographic reconnaissance flights over North Vietnam.
- August 7–9 – The Turkish Air Force strikes Greek positions on Cyprus.
- August 11 – Pope Paul VI becomes the first pope to fly in a helicopter, flying 113 kilometres (70 mi) from Castel Gandolfo, south of Rome, to a landing site near Orvieto, Italy.
- August 23 – Greek Air Force F-4 Phantom IIs are recalled while en route to attack Turkish military positions.

=== September ===
- Kingdom of Libya Airlines – the future Libyan Airlines – is founded. It will begin flight operations in August 1965.
- September 6 – Six men perform the world's first photographed six-man star formation while parachuting over Arvin, California.
- September 14 – President Lyndon B. Johnson presents the 1963 Harmon Trophy to astronaut L. Gordon Cooper, test pilot Fitzhugh Fulton, and pilot Betty Miller.
- September 21 – The United States Air Force′s first North American XB-70A Valkyrie – named Air Vehicle 1 (AV-1) – makes its first flight, flying from Palmdale to Edwards Air Force Base, California. The crew has to shut down one of its six engines shortly after takeoff, and it makes the flight with its landing gear down due to a landing gear malfunction, limiting the Mach 3+-capable aircraft to a top speed of 390 mph (628 km/h), only about half what was planned for the flight.

=== October ===
- October 1 – Derby Airways changes its name to British Midland Airways.
- October 10 – Skywriters draw the Olympic rings over Tokyo, Japan, during the opening ceremonies of the 1964 Summer Olympics.
- October 12 – On its third test flight, the United States Air Force′s first North American XB-70A Valkyrie – named Air Vehicle 1 (AV-1) – reaches supersonic speeds for the first time.
- October 13 – The first production Learjet, a Model 23, is delivered.
- October 16 – The People's Republic of China detonates its first nuclear weapon.
- October 23
  - U.S. Navy aircraft begin providing cover for Laotian government forces.
  - American rock musician David Box dies in a Cessna 172 Skyhawk which crashes nose-first and overturns at Houston, Texas. The other three people aboard the plane also die.
- October 24 – On its fourth test flight, the U.S. Air Force's first North American XB-70A Valkyrie – Air Vehicle 1 (AV-1) – flies at speeds above Mach 1 for 40 minutes.
- October 26 – United Airlines inaugurates jet service to Boise, Idaho.
- October 30 – The North American Air Defense Command begins manning its Combat Operations Center in the Cheyenne Mountain Complex in Colorado.
- October 31 – A snow goose strikes the T-38 Talon flown by American astronaut Theodore Freeman on approach to Ellington Air Force Base in Houston, Texas, causing immediate engine failure. Freeman ejects too close to the ground for his parachute to deploy and is killed.

=== November ===
- November 1 – Viet Cong infiltrators stage a mortar attack on Bien Hoa Air Base in South Vietnam, destroying five U.S. Air Force B-57 Canberra bombers, a U.S. Air Force HH-43F helicopter, and four Republic of Vietnam Air Force A-1 Skyraider attack aircraft, and damaging 15 B-57s and some HH-43Fs.
- November 2 – A U.S. Air Force HH-43F helicopter based at Bien Hoa Air Base, South Vietnam, conducts the first night rescue by the Air Force's Air-Sea Rescue Service in Southeast Asia.
- November 4 – The first automatic blind landing by a passenger aircraft occurs when a British European Airways Hawker Siddeley Trident lands in dense fog.
- November 15 – Bonanza Air Lines Flight 114, a Fairchild F27 Friendship, crashes near Sloan, Nevada, while on approach to McCarran International Airport in Las Vegas, in poor weather conditions, killing all 29 people on board. It will be the only fatal accident in the 23-year history of Bonanza Air Lines.
- November 18 – The U.S. Military Assistance Command, Vietnam, provides 105 United States Army helicopters to assist in transporting 7,000 South Vietnamese Army troops to attack a concentration of Viet Cong guerrillas believed to occupy a forest in South Vietnam 40 miles (64 km) northwest of Saigon near Thủ Dầu Một in the largest attack thus far of the Vietnam War. The South Vietnamese troops find no Viet Cong in the area and assess that they had withdrawn at least three days earlier.
- November 19 – Seventeen U.S. helicopters transport 54 South Vietnamese troops to attack Viet Cong guerrillas in South Vietnam's Quảng Nam Province. The South Vietnamese reportedly kill 17 Viet Cong and capture 21.
- November 20 – Linjeflyg Flight 277, a Convair CV-340 Metropolitan, crashes at Ängelholm, Sweden, during its approach to a Swedish Air Force base which is now Ängelholm-Helsingborg Airport. Thirty-one of the 43 people on board die, and all 12 survivors are injured.
- November 23 – Trans World Airlines Flight 800, a Boeing 707-331, crashes on takeoff from Leonardo da Vinci-Fiumicino Airport in Rome, Italy, due to engine failure, killing 50 of the 73 people on board and injuring all 23 survivors.
- November 26 – Belgian paratroops are dropped into Congo by the United States Air Force.

=== December ===
- President Humberto de Alencar Castelo Branco of Brazil ends the impasse over whether the Brazilian Air Force or the Brazilian Navy should control aircraft operated from the aircraft carrier Minas Gerais, assigning the responsibility to the navy. The air minister resigns and his successor is fired, and air force personnel machine-gun a naval helicopter on the ground at Porto Alegre in protest.
- December 8 – A United States Air Force B-58 Hustler carrying a nuclear bomb catches fire while taxiing at Bunker Hill Air Force Base in Indiana. The fire burns the bomb, causing radioactive contamination of the immediate area.
- December 14 – The U.S. Air Force launches Operation Barrel Roll, armed reconnaissance flights attacking the Ho Chi Minh trail in Laos.
- December 23–24 (overnight) – The first combat use of a fixed-wing gunship takes place when a U.S. Air Force minigun-armed Douglas FC-47 is called in to defend a United States Army Special Forces camp at Tranh Yend in South Vietnam's Mekong Delta that is under attack by the Viet Cong. It drops parachute flares and fires 4,500 rounds, scattering the attackers. Twenty minutes later, it breaks up a Viet Cong attack against another camp at Trung Hung. The success of the FC-47 results in the deployment of additional aircraft of its type, redesignated as the AC-47 and widely nicknamed "Spooky" and "Puff the Magic Dragon."
- December 24 – Flying Tiger Line Flight 282, a Lockheed Super Constellation cargo aircraft, crashes in San Bruno, California, shortly after takeoff from San Francisco International Airport, killing the entire crew of three.

== First flights ==
- American Champion Citabria
- Beriev Be-1 (first flight from water)

=== January ===
- January 5 – Shorts Belfast
- January 20 – Beechcraft King Air
- January 30 – Bölkow Bo 46

=== March ===
- March 3 – Sud-Aviation Super Caravelle
- March 7
  - Hawker Siddeley Kestrel
  - Helwan HA-300

=== April ===
- April 9 – de Havilland Canada DHC-5 Buffalo
- April 10 – EWR VJ 101C, the world's first supersonic V/STOL aircraft
- April 21 – HFB 320 Hansa Jet
- April 30 – Northrop F-5 Freedom Fighter with the United States Air Force's 4441st Combat Crew Training Squadron

=== May ===
- May 1 – BAC Type 221
- May 25 – Ryan XV-5

=== June ===
- June 26 – Curtiss-Wright X-19

=== July ===
- July 15 – Aviomilano F.250 I-RAIE, prototype of the SIAI Marchetti SF.260
- July 17 – Beagle B.206 Basset Series 1, civil version of the Beagle Basset

=== August ===
- August 27 – Beagle B.242
- August 29 – Piaggio PD.808

=== September ===
- September 4 – HAL HJT-16 Kiran
- September 21 –North American XB-70A Valkyrie
- September 24 – Mooney M22 Mustang
- September 27 – BAC TSR.2 XR219
- September 29 – LTV-Hiller-Ryan XC-142
- September 30 – Piper PA-31 Navajo

=== October ===
- Cessna YAT-37D, prototype of the Cessna A-37 Dragonfly
- October 2 – Piaggio P.166C
- October 14 – Sikorsky YCH-53
- October 19 – Agusta A.101 MM80358 FF
- October 24 – Alon A-2 Aircoupe
- October 30 – Bell Lunar Landing Research Vehicle

=== November ===
- November 1 – Agusta A.105
- November 7 – Robin DR.200
- November 18 – C-2 Greyhound
- November 25 – Convair Model 48 Charger

=== December ===
- December 8 – Turbay T-3
- December 21 – General Dynamics F-111 Aardvark
- December 22 – SR-71 Blackbird

== Entered service ==
- American Champion Citabria
- Boeing Vertol UH-46A Sea Knight with the United States Navy
- Sukhoi Su-11 (NATO reporting name "Fishpot-C") with the Soviet Air Forces and Soviet Air Defense Forces
- Westland Wasp with the Royal Navy
- Mid-1964 – Lightning F.3, third production model of the English Electric Lightning, with No. 74 Squadron, Royal Air Force
- Late 1964 – Beechcraft King Air

=== February ===
- Dassault Mirage IV with Armée de l'Air
- February 1 – Boeing 727 with Eastern Air Lines

=== April ===
- April 29 – Vickers VC10 with BOAC

=== May ===
- May 13 – Beagle B.206 Basset Series 1, civil version of the Beagle Basset, with Rolls-Royce Limited

=== June ===
- June 1 – Convair CV-580 Super Convair with Frontier Airlines

== Retirements ==
- Avro York by Skyways and Dan Air
- December 13 – Handley Page Hermes by Air Links, Ltd.

== Deadliest crash ==
The deadliest crash of this year was Aeroflot Flight 721, an Ilyushin Il-18 which crashed whilst on approach to Yuzhno-Sakhalinsk, Russian SFSR on September 2, killing 87 of the 93 people on board.
