= Joan Merriam Smith =

American aviator (1936–1965)

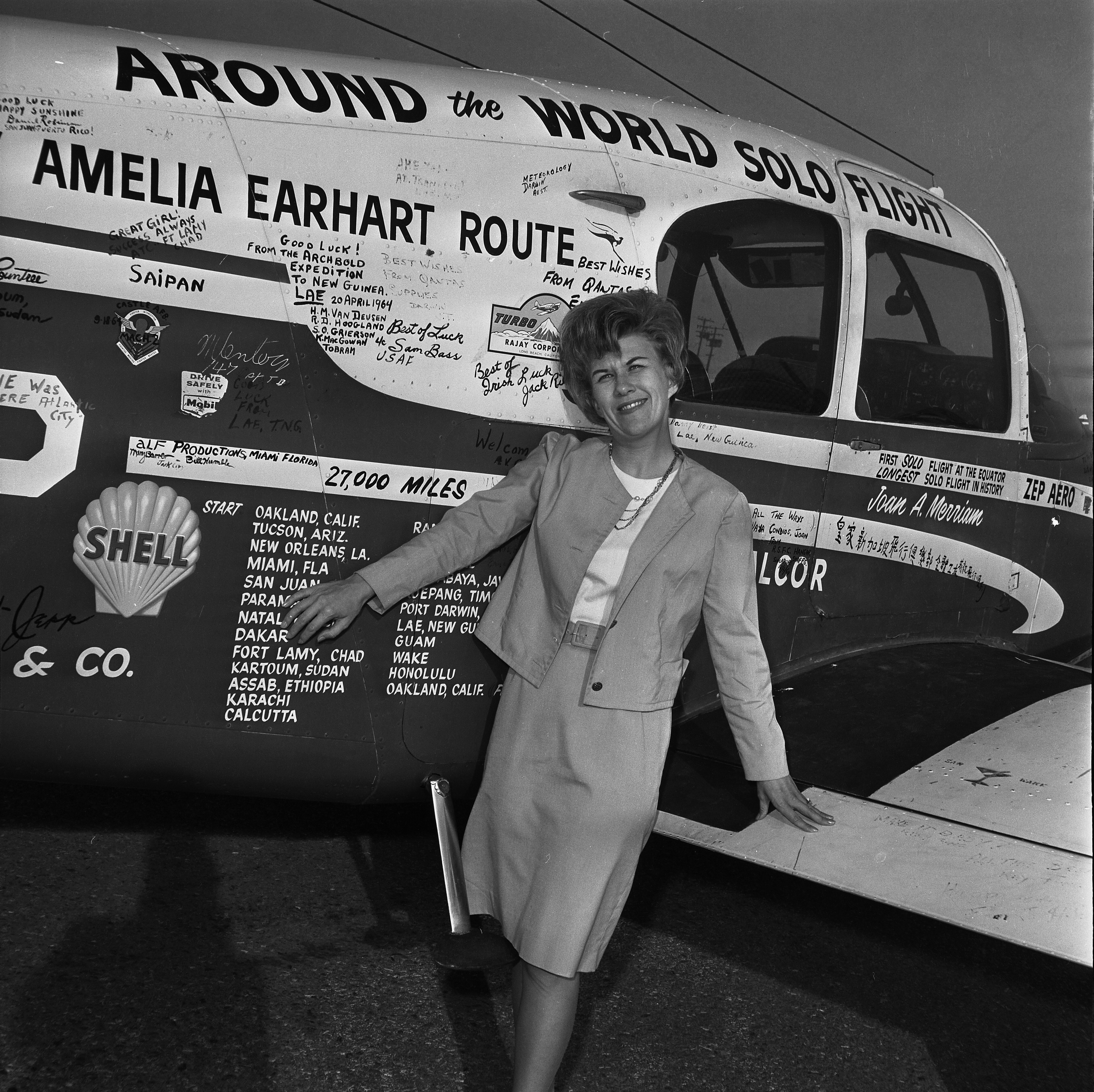
- Smith and her plane, December 1964
- Born: Joan Ann Merriam; August 3, 1936; Oceanside, Long Island, New York
- Died: February 17, 1965 (aged 28); San Gabriel Mountains near Big Pines, California
- Cause of death: Plane crash
- Occupation: Aviator
- Known for: Solo circumnavigation of the world by plane
- Awards: Harmon Trophy (1964)

Joan Merriam Smith (born Joan Ann Merriam, August 3, 1936 – February 17, 1965) was an American aviator, famous for her 1964 solo flight around the world, in which she became the second woman to complete the trip, by following the equatorial route attempted in 1937 by Amelia Earhart. (Jerrie Mock set off the same week on a different route in her Spirit of Columbus, and finished before Smith did.) In doing so she also became the first woman to fly a twin-engine aircraft around the world, and the first woman to fly the Pacific Ocean from west to east in a twin-engine plane. She died the following year when the plane she was piloting suffered structural failure and crashed in California.

== Biography ==
Joan Ann Merriam was born August 3, 1936, in Oceanside, New York. She was the daughter of Arthur Ray Merriam, Jr., a railroad office stenographer, and Ann Marie Lofgren Merriam. The family relocated to Wayne, Michigan, where she attended Jefferson Junior High School and Wayne High School. Following her father's death in 1952, she and her mother relocated – by plane – to Miami, where she graduated from Miama Senior High School in 1954.

Intrigued by her visit to the cockpit, she began taking flying lessons at the age of 15, and was issued a private pilot license shortly after she turned 17. Smith was the youngest entrant in the All Woman's International Air Race. She became the first woman to achieve the Airline Transport Rating at the minimum age of 23.

In 1955, Miss Merriam briefly married Harold MacDonald, a student in aeronautical engineering. In 1958, she met naval officer Lt. Commander Marvin G. "Jack" Smith, Jr., whom she married in 1960.

Smith's trip around the world began and ended in Oakland, California. She flew a twin-engine Piper Apache with the call sign N3251P ("51-Papa"), which she dubbed City of Long Beach in recognition of the city's sponsorship of her expedition. Leaving on March 17, 1964, she first followed the route Amelia Earhart and Fred Noonan had taken in 1937: across the southern United States, across the Caribbean to follow the northeast coast of South America, across the Atlantic Ocean to West Africa, across Africa and along the south coast of Asia, to Australia and New Guinea. She stopped at all the same way points as Earhart (except for Yangon in Myanmar, which had recently experienced a military coup). In New Guinea, she met with several people who had witnessed Earhart and Noonan's departure, apparently the last to see them. She also visited Saipan to investigate speculation about Earhart's possible fate there. She then flew across the Pacific Ocean via Wake and Midway Islands and Hawaii, and completed the trip on May 12, 1964, a trip of 27,750 miles and 56 days. (Mock had begun her trip two days after Smith, but completed it on April 17.)

Smith was involved in two plane crashes in the following year. In the first, she was forced to make a crash landing in the California desert on January 9, 1965, when the heater in the nose of City of Long Beach caught fire; she and her companion sustained minor injuries. On February 17, 1965, an uncharacteristic catastrophic in-flight break-up of the Cessna 182 aircraft that she was piloting out of Long Beach Airport occurred on a clear day with calm surface winds of 6 knots at approximately 8,200 feet MSL. Every control surface on the aircraft failed except the vertical fin and rudder and it crashed into the San Gabriel Mountains near Big Pines, California, killing Smith along with her biographer and fellow pilot Beatrice Ann “Trixie” Schubert.

She posthumously received the Harmon Trophy for Outstanding Aviatrix of 1964, which was announced by Vice President Hubert Humphrey at the White House. In 1966, The Ninety-Nines set up a memorial fund for Smith to build a replica of the aircraft N3251P, and in 1969, John H. Reading, then Mayor of Oakland, California declared May 12 as "Amelia Earhart-Joan Merriam Aviation Day." On March 17, 1969, Congress recommended that Joan Merriam-Smith and Amelia Earhart posthumously receive the Medal of Freedom. These honors have yet to be awarded.
