= Cessna 180 Skywagon =

American light aircraft

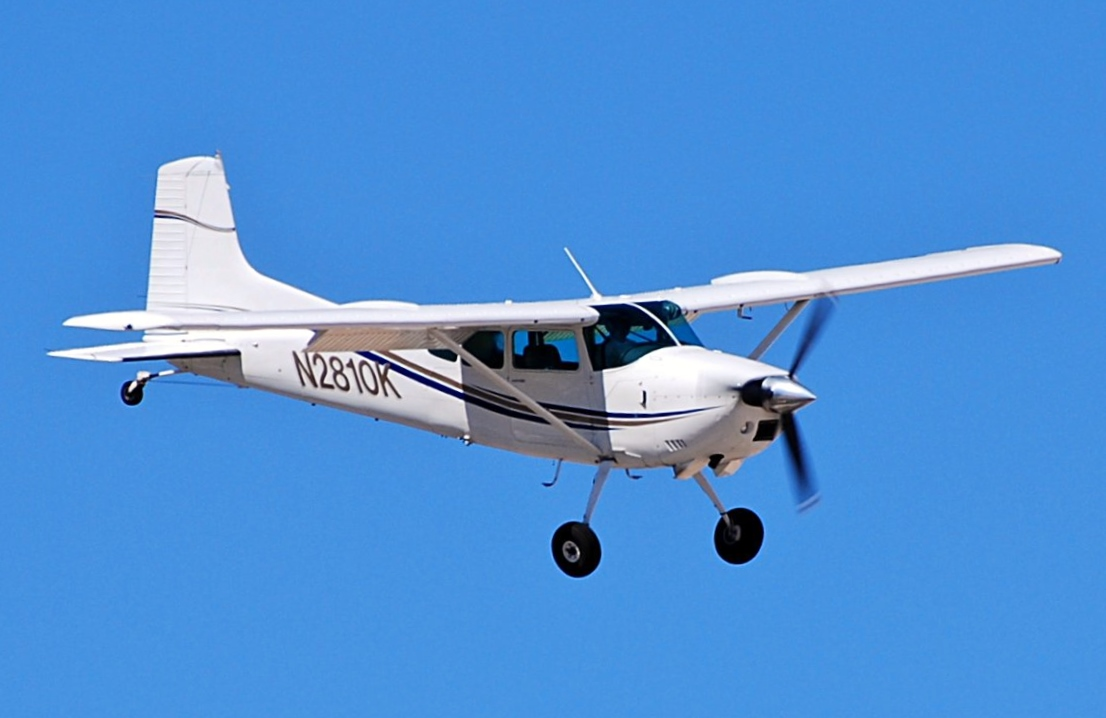

General information
- Type: Light utility aircraft
- Manufacturer: Cessna
- Number built: 6,193

History
- Manufactured: 1953–1981
- Introduction date: 1953
- First flight: May 26, 1952
- Variants: St-Just Cyclone; St-Just Super-Cyclone
- Developed into: Cessna 182 Skylane; Cessna 185 Skywagon

The Cessna 180 Skywagon is a four- or six-seat, fixed conventional gear general aviation airplane which was produced between 1953 and 1981. Though the design is no longer in production, many of these aircraft are still in use as personal aircraft and in utility roles such as bush flying.

== Development ==
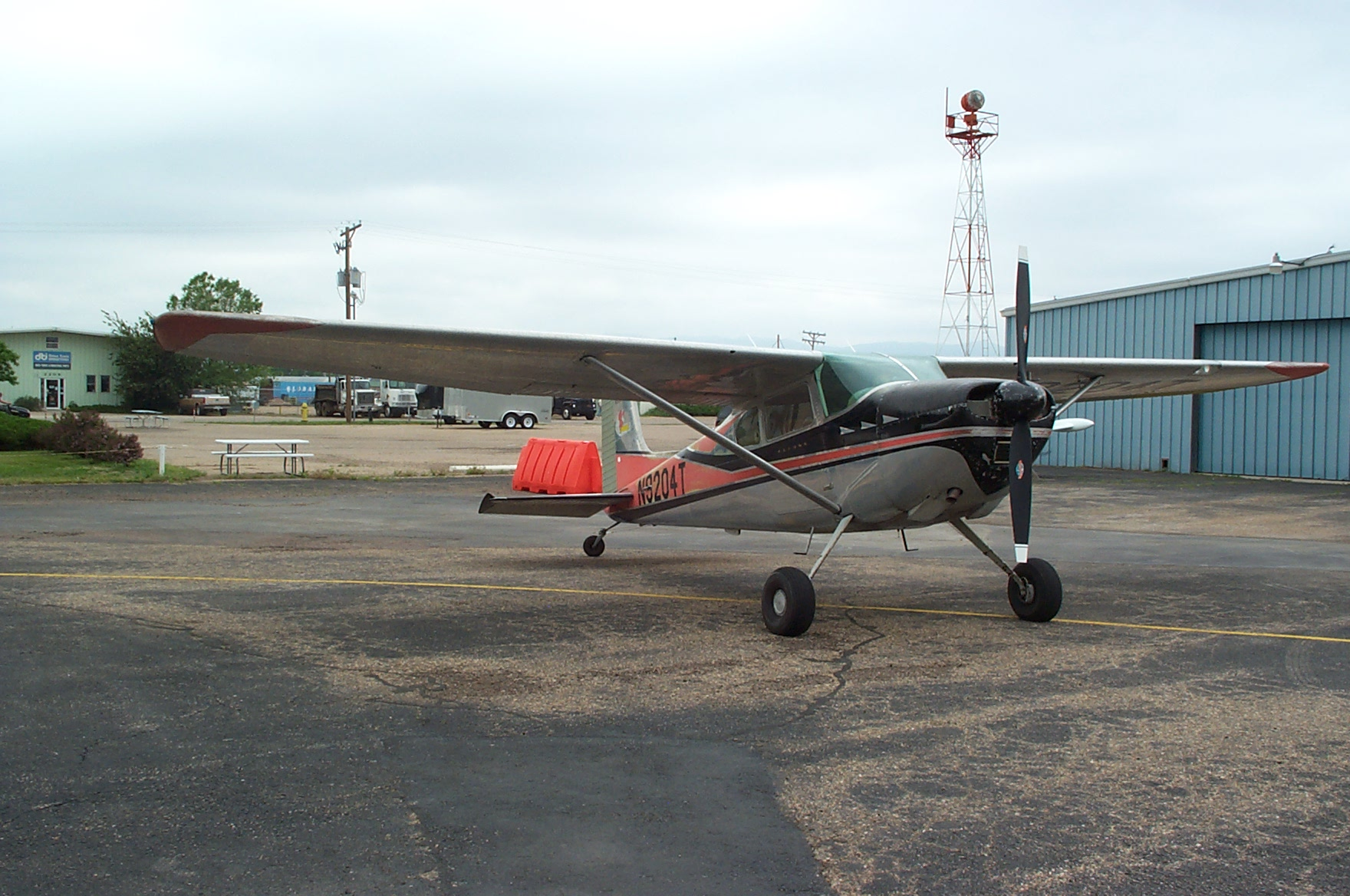
1960 Cessna 180

Cessna introduced the heavier and more powerful 180 as a complement to the Cessna 170. It eventually came to be known as the Skywagon, with the name appearing in promotional material by 1973.

The prototype Cessna 180, N41697, first flew on May 26, 1952. Cessna engineering test pilot William D. Thompson was at the controls.

In all its versions, 6,193 Cessna 180s were manufactured. In 1956, a tricycle gear version of this design was introduced as the Cessna 182, which came to bear the name Skylane. Additionally, in 1960, Cessna introduced a heavier, more powerful sibling to the 180, the conventional gear Cessna 185. For a time, all three versions of the design were in production.

== Design ==
The airframe of the 180 is all-metal, constructed of aluminum alloy. The fuselage is a semi-monocoque structure, with exterior skin sheets riveted to formers and longerons. The strut-braced wings, likewise, are constructed of exterior skin sheets riveted to spars and ribs. The landing gear of the 180 is in a conventional arrangement, with main gear legs made of spring steel, and a steerable tailwheel mounted on a hollow tapered steel tube.

Cessna 180s produced between 1953 and 1963 have two side windows, while 1964 to 1981 models feature three side windows, as they use the same fuselage as the Cessna 185. 180s can be equipped with floats and skis.

== Operational history ==
=== Record flight ===
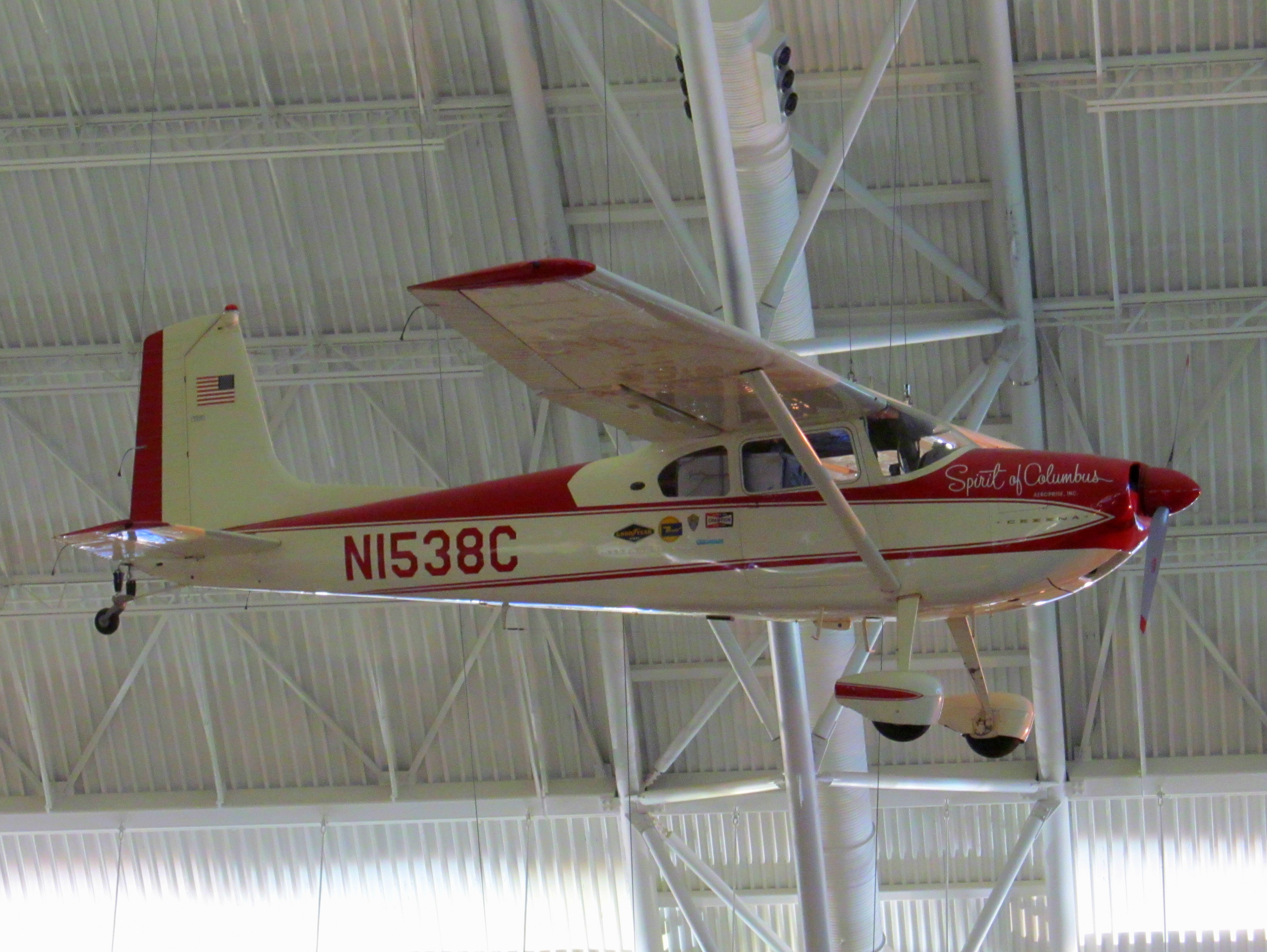
Jerrie Mock's Cessna 180, the Spirit of Columbus

The Cessna 180 gained recognition as the aircraft chosen by Geraldine Mock, the first woman pilot to successfully fly around the world. The flight was made in 1964 in her 1953 model, the Spirit of Columbus (N1538C), as chronicled in her 1970 book Three-Eight Charlie. The Cessna factory obtained the aircraft and kept it at the Pawnee (Wichita, Kansas) manufacturing plant after the epic flight, suspended from the ceiling over one of the manufacturing lines. It is currently on display at the National Air and Space Museum.

== Variants ==
Cessna has historically used model years similar to U.S. auto manufacturers, with sales of new models typically starting a few months prior to the actual calendar year.

180
Introduced for the 1953 model year with four seats, all-metal construction, a 225 hp (168 kW) Continental O-470-A engine driving a constant-speed propeller, a squared vertical tail (as opposed to previous types' rounded tails), "Para-Lift" flaps, spring steel landing gear with a steerable tail wheel, and a gross weight of 2,550 lb (1,157 kg). The 1954 model year introduced a 225 hp (168 kW) O-470-J engine and interior refinements. 1956 introduced a 230 hp (172 kW) O-470-K engine with a new air intake duct. Certified on 23 December 1952. 641 (1953), 620 (1954), 891 (1955), and 512 (1956) built.

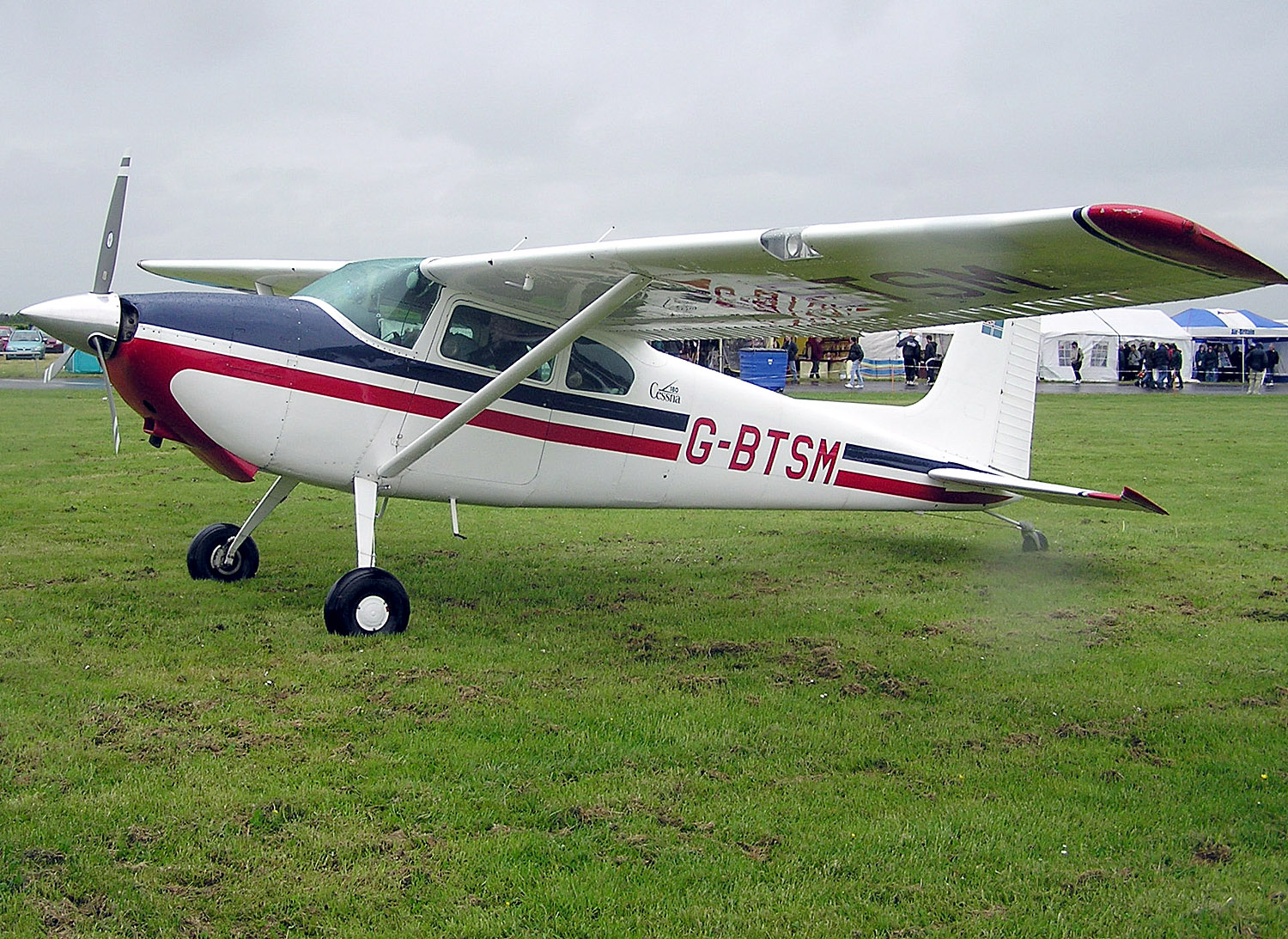
A 1957 Cessna on display at Hullavington Airfield, England.

180A
Introduced for the 1957 model year with revised instrument panel, improved tailwheel steering, a new parking brake, and an increased gross weight of 2,650 lb (1,202 kg). Certified on 17 December 1956. 694 total built; 444 (1957) and 250 (1958).

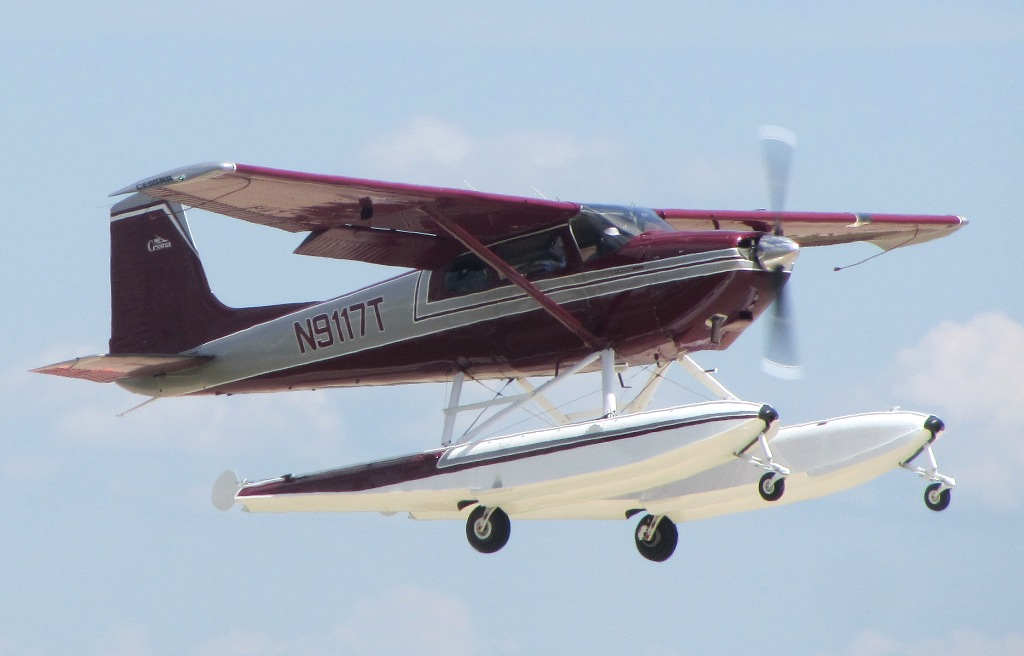
1959 Cessna 180B on amphibious floats

180B
1959 model year with a redesigned instrument panel. Certified on 22 August 1958. 306 built.
180C
1960 model year with a revised cowling with a new front-mounted intake filter. Powered by a 230 hp (172 kW) Continental O-470-K (also certified for the O-470-L or O-470-R). Certified on 8 July 1959. 251 built.
180D
1961 model year with a 230 hp (172 kW) Continental O-470-L engine (also certified for the O-470-R) and a redesigned instrument panel. Certified on 14 June 1960. 152 built.
180E
1962 model year with a 230 hp (172 kW) Continental O-470-R engine (also certified for the O-470-L), redesigned 65 US gal (246 L) fuel tanks or optional 84 US gal (318 L) tanks, and new wingtips. Certified on 21 September 1961. 112 built.
180F
1963 model year with interior refinements, including semi-reclining seats, new rudder pedals, and instrument panel lighting controls. Certified on 25 June 1962. 129 built.

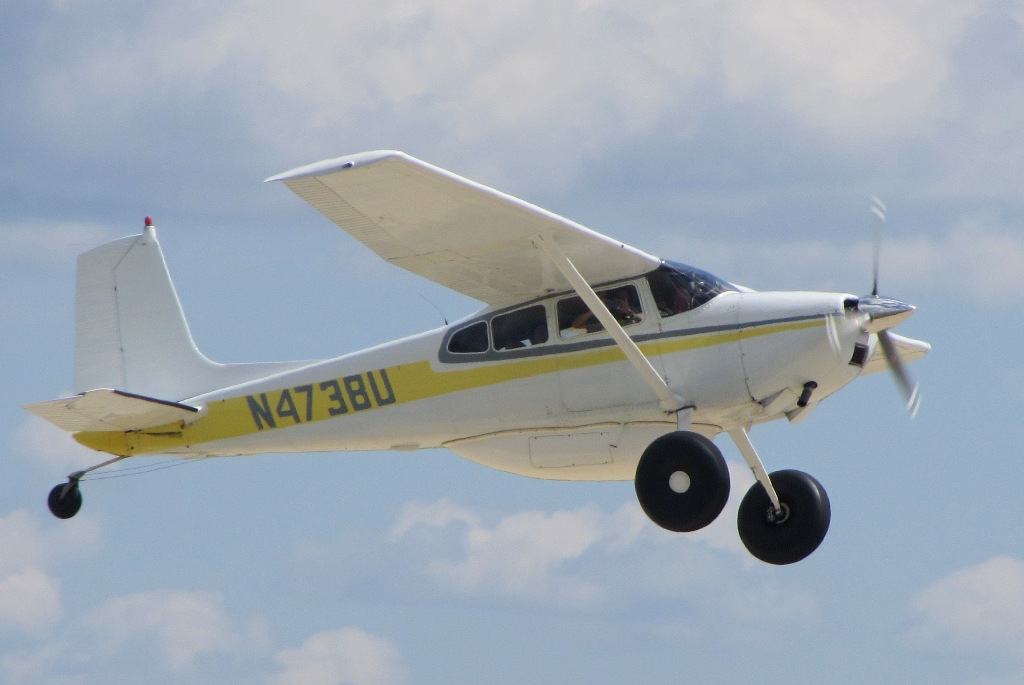
Cessna 180G with belly cargo pod and tundra tires

180G
1964 model year with the larger fuselage (minus the firewall), wings, and landing gear of the Model 185, an alternator, and provisions for an extra utility seat, bringing total capacity to six people. Gross weight was increased to 2,800 lb (1,270 kg). These changes made the 180 largely identical to the 185, with the smaller dorsal fairing of the former being the primary external difference between the two models. Certified on 19 July 1963. 133 built.
180H
Introduced for the 1965 model year with the firewall of the 185, a redesigned instrument panel, and an improved fuel strainer. The 1966 model year featured improved door latches. 1967 introduced a pointed propeller spinner, increased stowage area, an Aeroflash rotating beacon, and an optional door on the left side. 1968 introduced new seat belts and stowable rudder pedals on the right side. Beginning in 1969, Cessna used the marketing name Skywagon to refer to the 180. 1970 introduced new wingtips and an optional external cargo pack with a capacity of 300 lb (136 kg). Certified on 17 June 1964. 839 total built; 162 (1965), 167 (1966), 101 (1967), 118 (1968), 110 (1969), 72 (1970), 46 (1971), and 63 (1972) built.
180J Skywagon
Introduced for the 1973 model year with a new "Camber-Lift" wing with a redesigned leading edge, a revised instrument panel, and nose-mounted landing/taxi lights. The 1974 model year introduced optional cabin door bubble windows for improved downward visibility. 1975 introduced a 230 hp (172 kW) Continental O-470-S engine. Certified on 13 October 1972. 100 (1973), 116 (1974), 120 (1975), and 150 (1976).
180K Skywagon
Introduced for the 1977 model year with a 230 hp (172 kW) Continental O-470-U engine for which AVGAS 100 or 100LL is specified (previous engines were designed for AVGAS 80, formerly called 80/87), a strengthened tailwheel, and rearranged flight instruments in a "T" configuration. The smaller dorsal fairing of previous models was replaced with the larger 185-style fairing. The 1978 model year introduced the Skywagon II with a preferred options package. All subsequent model years featured only minor changes. Certified on 19 August 1976. 433 total built; 135 (1977), 95 (1978), 115 (1979), 52 (1980), and 36 (1981).

=== Military variants ===
U-17C
Eight 180E and nine 180H aircraft acquired by the United States military for export.

== Operators ==
=== Civil ===
The Cessna 180 is popular with air charter companies and is operated by private individuals and companies.

=== Military ===
Australia

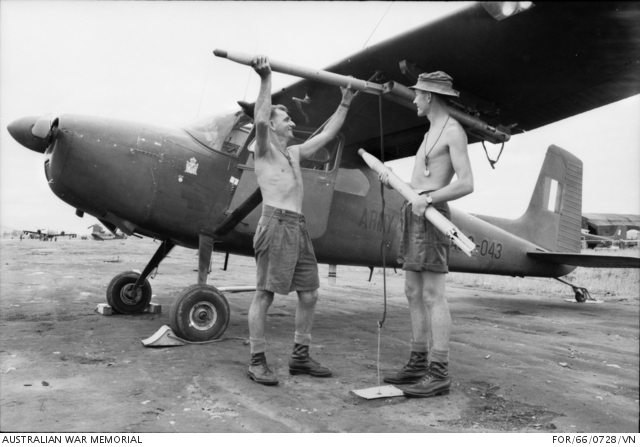
161 (Independent) Reconnaissance Flight ground crew load 2.75 inch white phosphorus rockets onto a Cessna 180 at Vung Tau Air Base in 1966

- Royal Australian Air Force
- Australian Army Aviation

Union of Burma

- Union of Burma Air Force

Costa Rica

- Public Force of Costa Rica

El Salvador

- Salvadoran Air Force

Guatemala

Guatemalan Air Force

Honduras

- Honduran Air Force

Indonesia

- Indonesian Air Force

Israel

- Israeli Air Force

Khmer Republic

- Khmer Air Force

Nicaragua

- Nicaraguan Air Force

Philippines

- Philippine Air Force

== Specifications (1978 Cessna 180 II landplane) ==
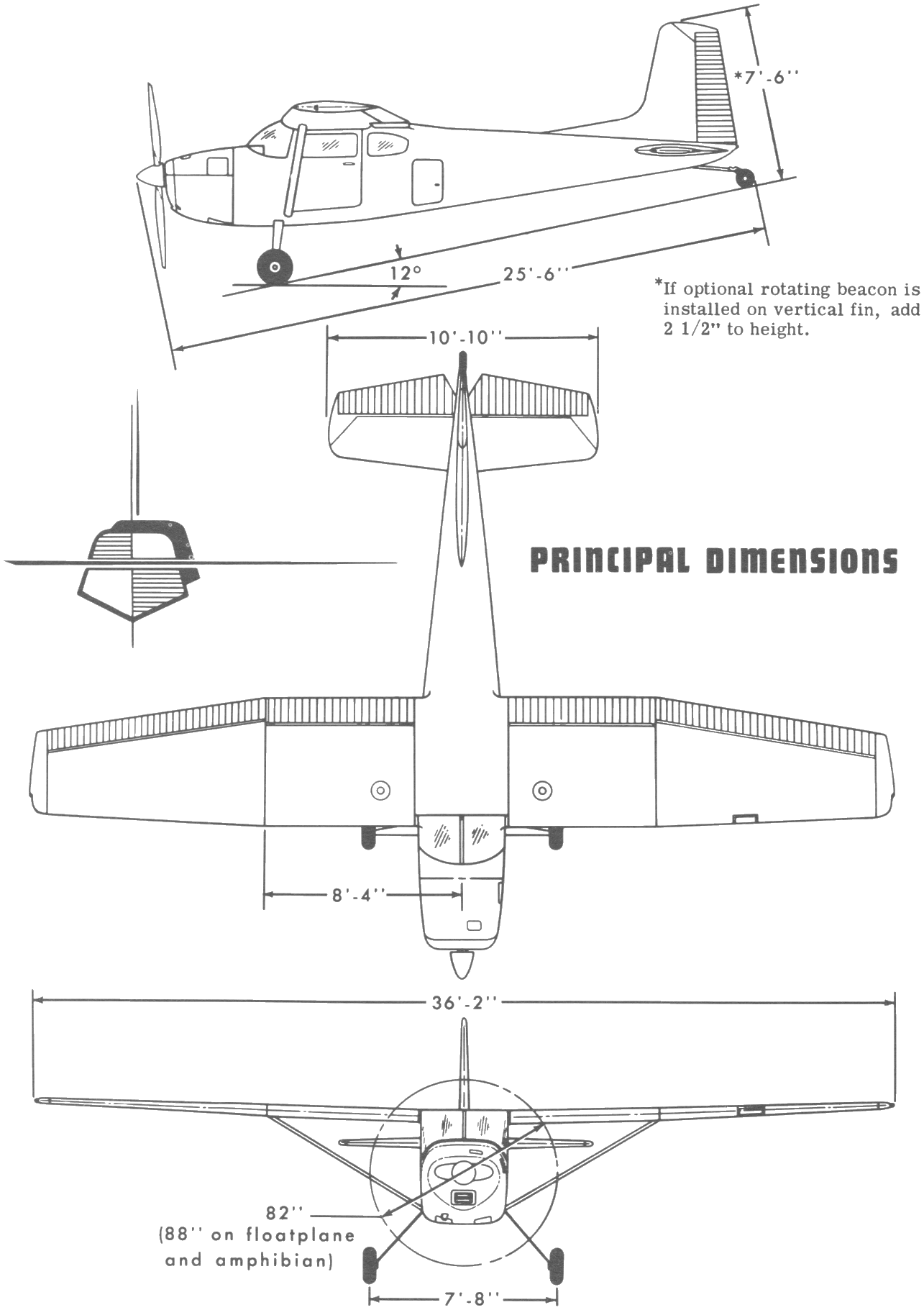
3-view line drawing of the Cessna 180E

Data from Cessna

General characteristics

- Crew: one
- Capacity: five passengers
- Length: 25 ft 9 in (7.85 m)
- Wingspan: 35 ft 10 in (10.92 m)
- Height: 7 ft 9 in (2.36 m)
- Wing area: 174 sq ft (16.2 m^{2})
- Empty weight: 1,700 lb (771 kg)
- Gross weight: 2,800 lb (1,270 kg)
- Powerplant: 1 × Continental O-470-U , 230 hp (170 kW)
- Propellers: 2-bladed constant speed, 6 ft 10 in (2.08 m) diameter

Performance

- Maximum speed: 148 kn (170 mph, 274 km/h)
- Cruise speed: 142 kn (163 mph, 263 km/h)
- Stall speed: 48 kn (55 mph, 89 km/h)
- Range: 890 nmi (1,020 mi, 1,650 km)
- Service ceiling: 17,700 ft (5,400 m)
- Rate of climb: 1,100 ft/min (5.6 m/s)
- Wing loading: 16.1 lb/sq ft (79 kg/m^{2})

== See also ==
Related development

- Cessna 170
- Cessna 182
- Cessna 185

== Bibliography ==
- Gaines, Mike (November 6, 1982). "World Air Forces 1982". Flight International. Vol. 122, no. 3835. pp. 1327–1388. ISSN 0015-3710.
- Hagedorn, Daniel P. (1993). Central American and Caribbean Air Forces. Tonbridge, Kent, UK: Air-Britain (Historians) Ltd. ISBN 0-85130-210-6.
- Hatch, Paul F. (December 3, 1988). "World Air Forces 1988". Flight International. Vol. 134, no. 4142. pp. 22–87. ISSN 0015-3710. Archived from the original on May 19, 2019.
- Grandolini, Albert (September–December 1988). "L'Aviation Royale Khmere: The first 15 years of Cambodian military aviation". Air Enthusiast. No. Thirty–seven. pp. 39–47. ISSN 0143-5450.
- "Pentagon Over the Islands: The Thirty-Year History of Indonesian Military Aviation". Air Enthusiast Quarterly (2): 154–162. n.d. ISSN 0143-5450.
