= Steven F. Udvar-Hazy Center =

National Air and Space Museum Steven F. Udvar-Hazy Center

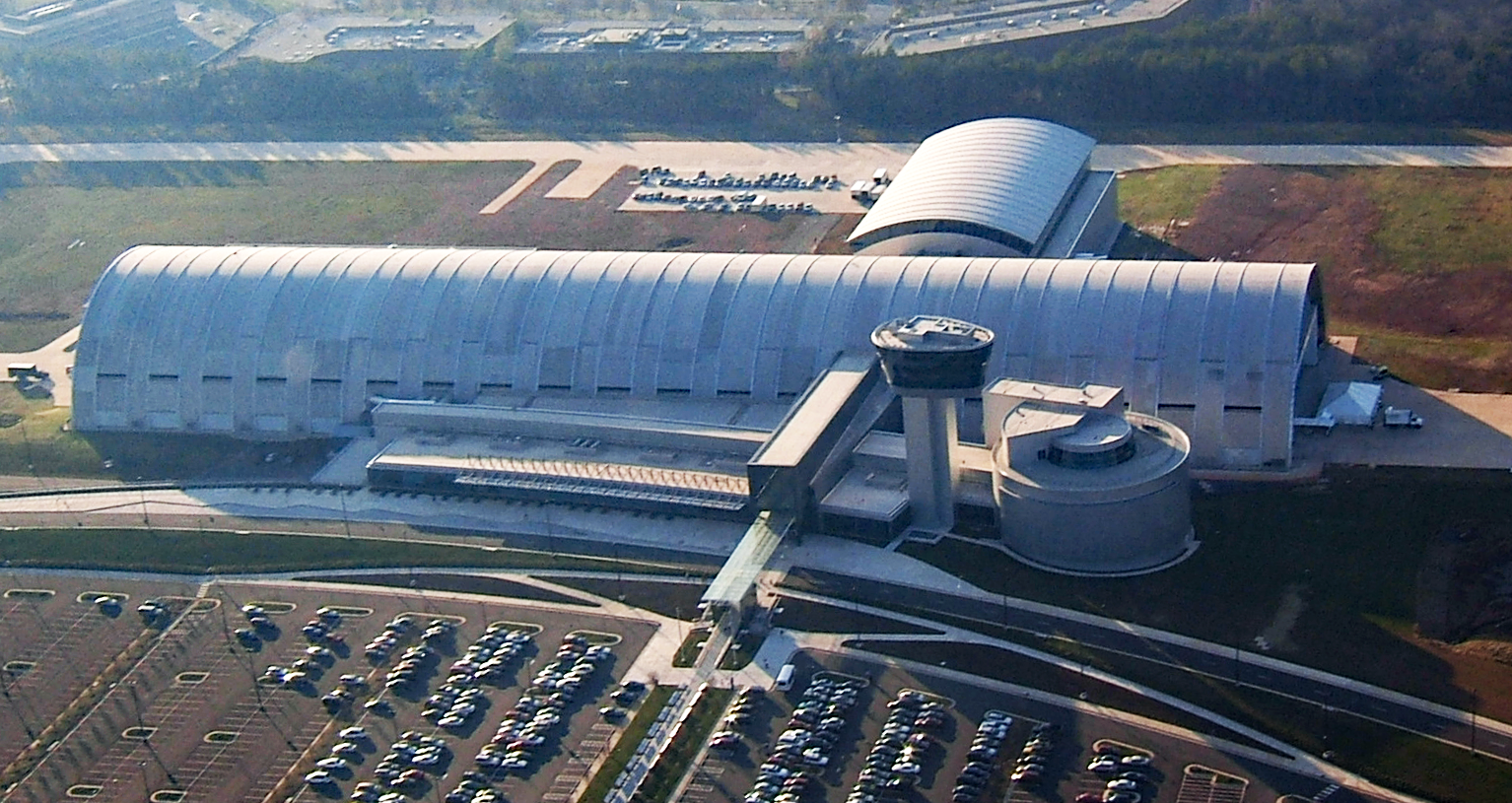
- Aerial view of the Udvar-Hazy Center in 2004
- Established: December 15, 2003
- Location: Dulles International Airport, Chantilly, Virginia, U.S.
- Coordinates: 38°54′41″N 77°26′39″W
- Type: Aviation museum
- Accreditation: American Alliance of Museums
- Key holdings: Space Shuttle Discovery, Enola Gay
- Collection size: 3,000 artifacts, including 200 aircraft and spacecraft
- Visitors: 1.2 million (2023)
- Owner: Smithsonian Institution
- Public transit access: Fairfax Connector: 983
- Website: airandspace.si.edu/visit/udvar-hazy-center

The Steven F. Udvar-Hazy Center is an annex of the Smithsonian Institution's National Air and Space Museum located at Dulles International Airport in Chantilly, Virginia, which houses much of the museum's collection of aircraft, spacecraft, and rockets, which are too large to be displayed at the main facility on the National Mall. The large hangar contains some of the most iconic artifacts in aviation history, including the Space Shuttle Discovery, the Enola Gay, and the Boeing 367-80, as well as examples of the SR-71 Blackbird and Concorde.

The 760,000-square-foot (71,000 m^{2}; 17-acre; 7.1 ha) facility was made possible by a $65 million donation in October 1999 to the Smithsonian Institution by Steven F. Udvar-Házy, an immigrant from Hungary and co-founder of the International Lease Finance Corporation, an aircraft leasing corporation.

Prior to the facility's opening in 2003, much of the museum's collection had been inaccessible to the public, as its size vastly outstripped the space available to the museum on the National Mall. Most of the collection had been stored out of sight at the museum's conservation shop, the Paul E. Garber Preservation, Restoration, and Storage Facility in Silver Hill, Maryland. After the Udvar-Hazy Center made much of the collection available to the public in 2003, the restoration and conservation facilities were moved to the facility in 2010 with the construction of an additional wing of the museum funded by Airbus. The restoration facility includes observation windows, allowing the public to view some of the preservation work. The Udvar-Hazy Center receives over 1.2 million visitors annually, as of 2023.

The Udvar-Hazy Center is directly attached to the Dulles International Airport runways via a private taxiway, allowing some accessions to be flown directly to the facility rather than requiring disassembly and ground transport. The airport's large runways can accommodate any size of commercial or military aircraft.

The facility also hosts the Airbus IMAX Theater, a single-screen 4K laser cinema which projects onto the largest IMAX screen in the region. It plays both box-office releases and special screenings.

== Architecture and facilities ==
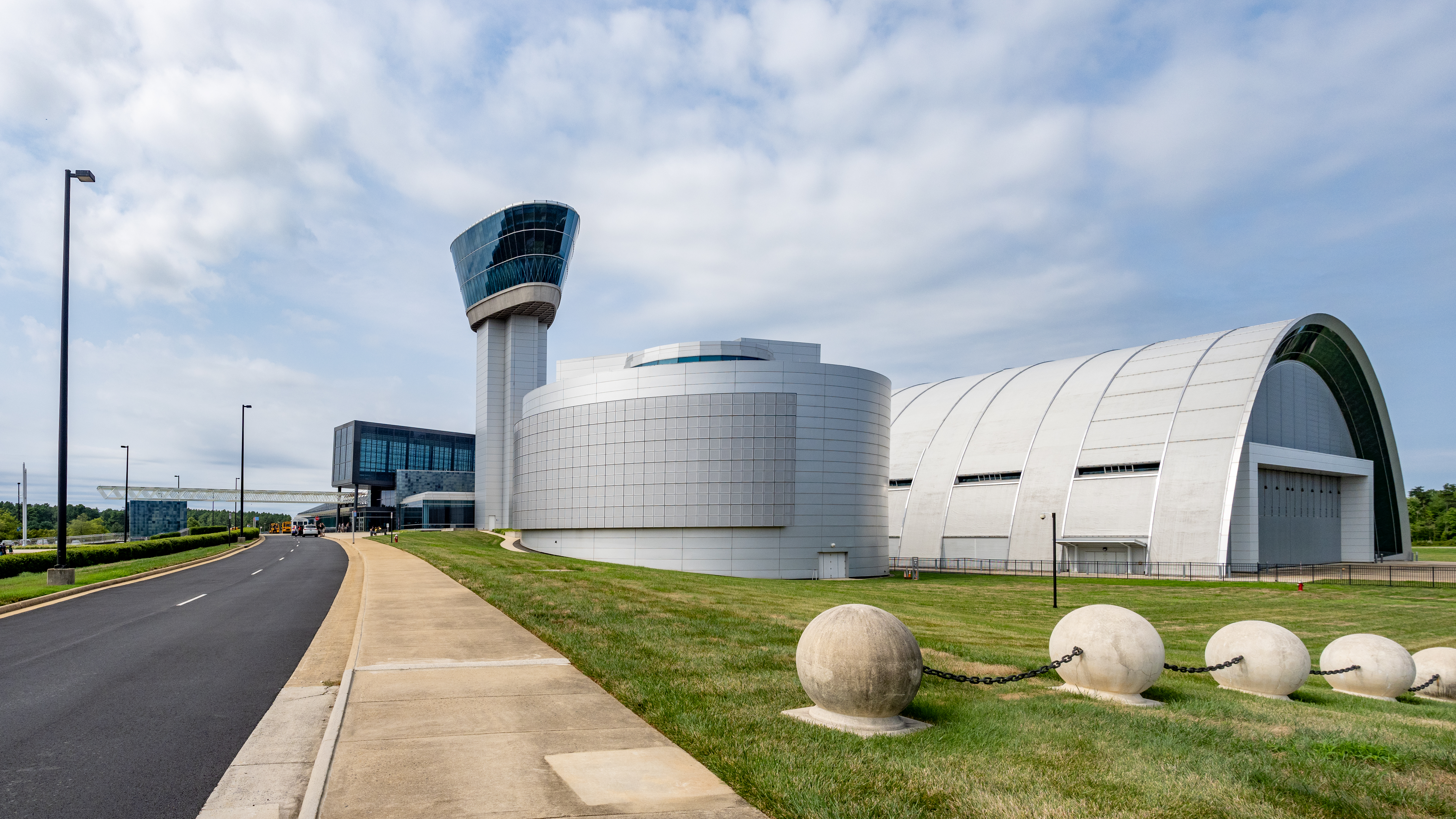
The exterior of the Udvar-Hazy center in 2024.

Designed by Hellmuth, Obata, and Kassabaum, who also designed the National Air and Space Museum building, the Center required 15 years of preparation and was built by Hensel Phelps Construction Co. The exhibition areas comprise two large hangars, the 293,707-square-foot (27,286.3 m^{2}) Boeing Aviation Hangar and the 53,067-square-foot (4,930.1 m^{2}) James S. McDonnell Space Hangar. The Donald D. Engen Observation Tower provides a view of landing operations at adjacent Washington Dulles International Airport. The museum also contains an IMAX theater. A taxiway connects the museum to the airport.

An expansion of the Udvar-Hazy Center is dedicated to the behind-the-scenes care of the Smithsonian's collection of aircraft, spacecraft, related artifacts and archival materials. On December 2, 2008, the Steven F. Udvar-Hazy Center received a gift of $6 million for phase two from Airbus Americas Inc. — the largest corporate gift to the Smithsonian Institution in 2008.

The wing includes:

- The Mary Baker Engen Restoration Hangar — spacious enough to accommodate several aircraft at one time with a second-floor viewing area designed to give visitors a behind-the-scenes look.
- Archives — the foremost collection of documentary records of the history, science and technology of aeronautics and space flight will be housed in a single location for the first time, providing researchers with ample space and equipment.
- The Emil Buehler Conservation Laboratory — provides conservators much-needed space to develop and execute specialized preservation strategies for artifacts.
- Collections processing unit — a dedicated loading dock and specially designed secure area for initial inspection and analysis of artifacts.

A further expansion of the collections center was approved in December 2016. The addition will be made up of three additional storage modules on the south side of the building. An additional expansion of the museum space was approved on September 9, 2025; the expansion, which will be completed by 2028, will increase the museum's space by 20%, allowing for the display of numerous aircraft from the Smithsonian's collection, including the restored Flak-Bait and the newly-acquired B-17 Shoo Shoo Shoo Baby.

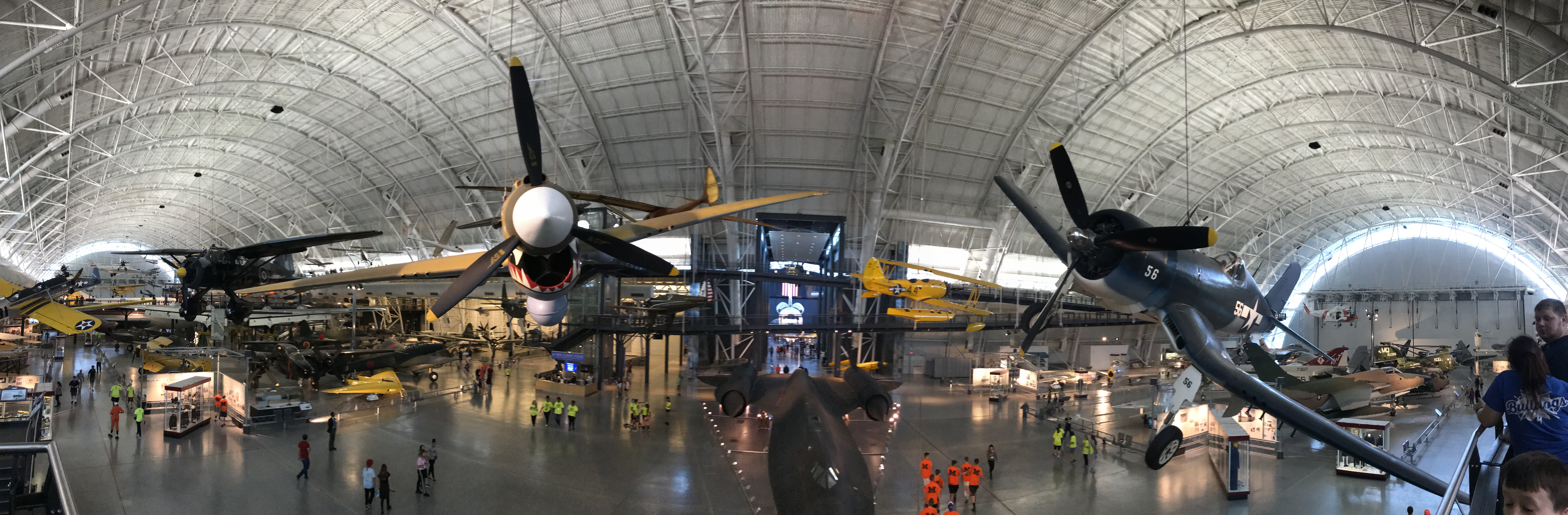
Main exhibition display area

== Collection ==
The center was opened on December 15, 2003. The Udvar-Hazy Center displays historic aviation and space artifacts, especially items too large for the National Air and Space Museum's building on the National Mall, including:

- The Enola Gay, the Boeing B-29 Superfortress which dropped the first atomic bomb on Hiroshima, Japan
- The orbital spacecraft Space Shuttle Discovery was put on public display in the James S. McDonnell Space Hangar on April 19, 2012, replacing the atmospheric test vehicle, Space Shuttle Enterprise.
- A first-generation tracking and data relay satellite (TDRS) that hangs directly above Discovery
- The Gemini 4 space capsule
- The Friendship 7 space capsule
- Spirit of Columbus, flown in 1964 by Jerrie Mock to become the first woman to fly solo around the world
- A Lockheed SR-71 Blackbird reconnaissance aircraft
- An Air France Concorde supersonic airliner
- A United States Air Force Lockheed C-121 Constellation, the military version of the Lockheed Constellation ("Connie") airliner
- The Boeing 367-80 ("Dash-80") jet transport, which was the prototype for the KC-135 tanker and the 707 airliner
- The only surviving Bell XV-15 experimental tiltrotor craft
- A PGM-11 Redstone rocket
- A SAM-N-2 Lark like the one which scored the first successful United States surface-to-air missile interception of a flying target
- The only surviving Verville-Sperry M-1 Messenger, the USAAS's first messenger aircraft
- The Langley Aerodrome A, an early attempt at powered flight by Smithsonian Secretary Samuel Pierpont Langley
- The Northrop N-1 experimental aircraft
- The only surviving Boeing 307 Stratoliner, the ex-Pan Am Clipper Flying Cloud
- One of two surviving German Heinkel He 219 Uhu night fighters
- The only surviving German Dornier Do 335 Pfeil fighter
- The only surviving German Horten Ho 229 prototype flying wing jet fighter/bomber
- The only surviving German Arado Ar 234 Blitz jet bomber
- The only surviving German Horten H.VI flying wing aircraft
- One of three surviving German Bachem Ba 349 Natter rocket-powered interceptors
- The only surviving Japanese Nakajima J1N1-S Gekko
- The only surviving Japanese Aichi M6A1 Seiran
- The only surviving Japanese Kyushu J7W Shinden
- One of four surviving Northrop P-61 Black Widow night fighters
- One of two surviving Boeing P-26 Peashooter fighters
- A Bede BD-5, single-seat, home-built aircraft that was somewhat popular in the 1970s (5J version is the smallest crewed jet aircraft)
- The Beck-Mahoney Sorceress, known as the "winningest" racing biplane in aviation history
- A British Hawker Hurricane fighter
- A Japanese balloon bomb like the one that killed six U.S. civilians in Oregon during World War II
- Lockheed Martin X-35 Joint Strike Fighter, prototype of the Lockheed Martin F-35 Lightning II
- A balloon of the Soviet Vega probes to Venus, the first aircraft flown in another planet
- Grumman F-14 Tomcat fighter involved in the Gulf of Sidra incident (1989).
- The Gossamer Albatross, which was the first man-powered aircraft to fly across the English Channel
- The primary special-effects miniature of the "Mothership" used in the filming of Close Encounters of the Third Kind
- The Virgin Atlantic GlobalFlyer piloted by Steve Fossett for the first solo nonstop and nonrefueled circumnavigation of Earth
- The first aircraft operated by FedEx, a Dassault Falcon 20
- A piece of fabric from the LZ 129 Hindenburg that survived the Hindenburg disaster.
- Universal's filming model of the LZ 129 Hindenburg from The Hindenburg.
- Mercury-Atlas 10 unused Project Mercury spacecraft
- U.S. Coast Guard Sikorsky HH-52 Seaguard helicopter
- A Sikorsky JRS-1 twin-engine aircraft, one of only three surviving aircraft from the Attack on Pearl Harbor
- A Launch Entry Suit
- A Vought RF-8 Crusader reconnaissance aircraft
- A McDonnell Douglas F-4S Phantom II fighter
- A Soviet Mikoyan-Gurevich MiG-15 fighter
- The NASA Pathfinder, an early solar powered aircraft
- A Piasecki PV-2 helicopter
- A French Caudron G.4 bomber
- A German Focke-Wulf Fw 190F fighter/bomber
- A British Westland Lysander Army cooperation aircraft
- A CASA 352L transport
- A Republic F-105D Thunderchief fighter-bomber
- A Lockheed P-38 Lightning fighter
- Darryl Greenamyer's Grumman F8F Bearcat "Conquest I" racing aircraft
- The North American P-51C Mustang "Excalibur III" fighter
- A North American F-86 Sabre fighter
- A Republic P-47 Thunderbolt fighter
- A Grumman F6F-3 Hellcat fighter
- A Soviet Mikoyan-Gurevich MiG-21 "Fishbed" fighter
- A Beechcraft Bonanza
- A Beechcraft Model 18
- A Bell 47 helicopter
- A Bell H-13 Sioux helicopter
- A Bell UH-1 Iroquois helicopter
- A Boeing-Stearman Model 75 biplane trainer aircraft
- A Grumman A-6E Intruder ground-attack aircraft
- A Curtiss P-40E Kittyhawk fighter
- A Vought F4U-1D Corsair fighter
- A Piper J-3 Cub
- A Grumman G-22 Gulfhawk II
- An Aeronca C-2 ultralight aircraft
- The Stanley Nomad glider
- An Arrow Sport A2
- A Space Systems/Loral FS-1300 communications satellite, previously a ground spare for Sirius Satellite Radio
- The Shuttle Radar Topography Mission payload that flew on STS-99.
- Bob Hoover's Shrike Commander
- Gondola of Breitling Orbiter 3, the first balloon to fly around the world non-stop
- Gondola C-49 of Goodyear Blimp Columbia (N4A), class GZ-20, and Gondola of Goodyear Pilgrim
- A Yokosuka MXY-7 Ohka kamikaze aircraft
- A Pegasus XL air-launched rocket.
- A General Atomics MQ-1 Predator which was one of the first three UAVs to fly combat missions over Afghanistan following the 9/11 attacks
- Foam 331, an Oshkosh airport crash tender which was among the emergency vehicles which responded to The Pentagon after it was attacked on 9/11

The museum is still in the process of installing exhibits, and 169 aircraft and 152 large space artifacts were on display as of May 2012; plans called for the eventual installation of over 200 aircraft. Over 5,809 objects out of the 60,000 objects held in trust are on display as of 2016. The current list is maintained at the Objects On Display page of the Smithsonian Institution NASM Collections site.

== Events ==
A number of events are held at the museum throughout the year. These include lectures, book signings, sleepovers, and events for children. Some of the museum's larger events include Air & Scare for Halloween, an open house, and Innovations in Flight: Family Day and Outdoor Aviation Display.

== Media appearances ==
The center made its first media appearance in the 2009 film Transformers: Revenge of the Fallen. The center remained open while filming took place, although certain areas were closed.

== Gallery ==
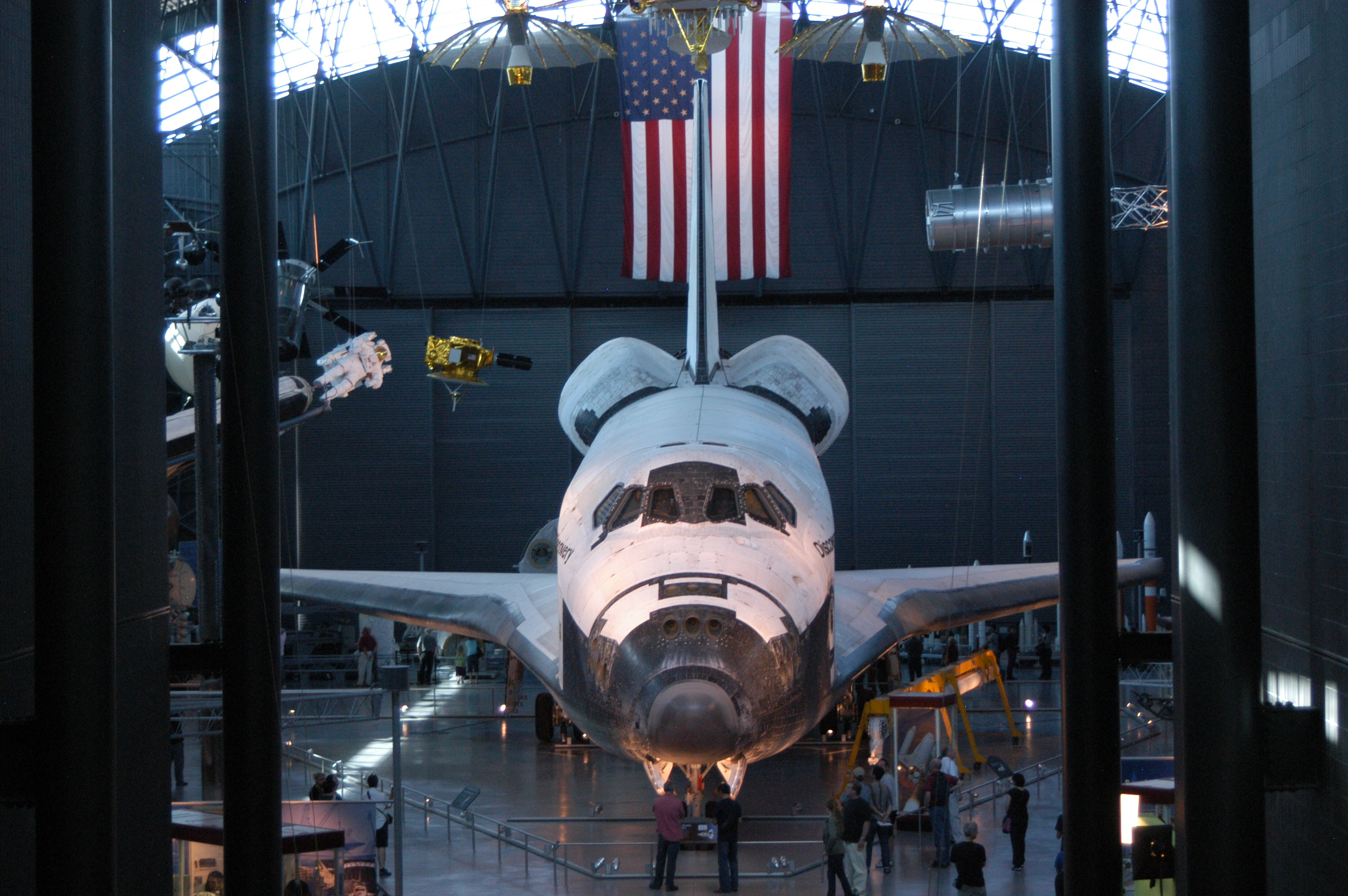
The Space Shuttle Discovery

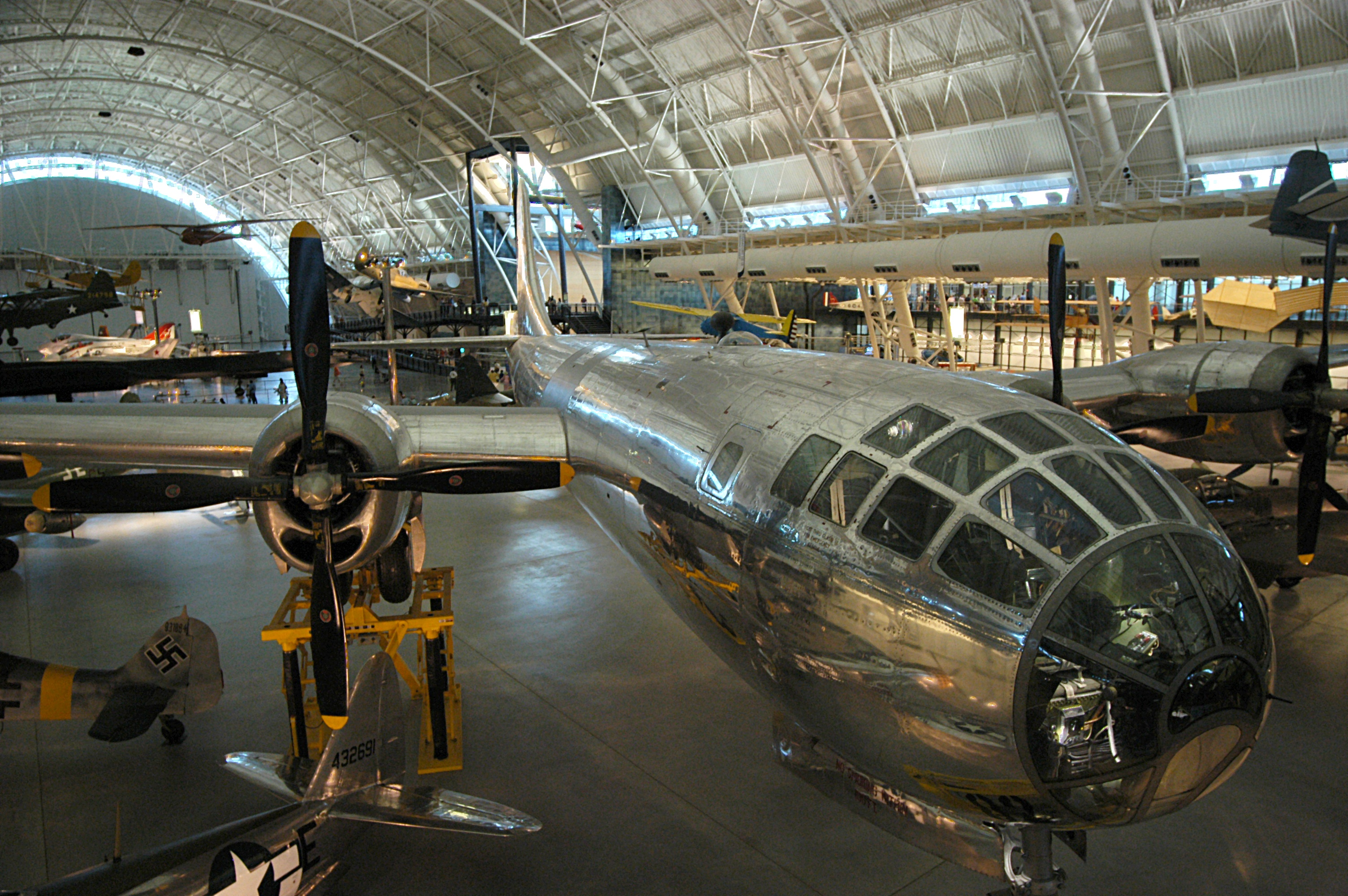
The Enola Gay

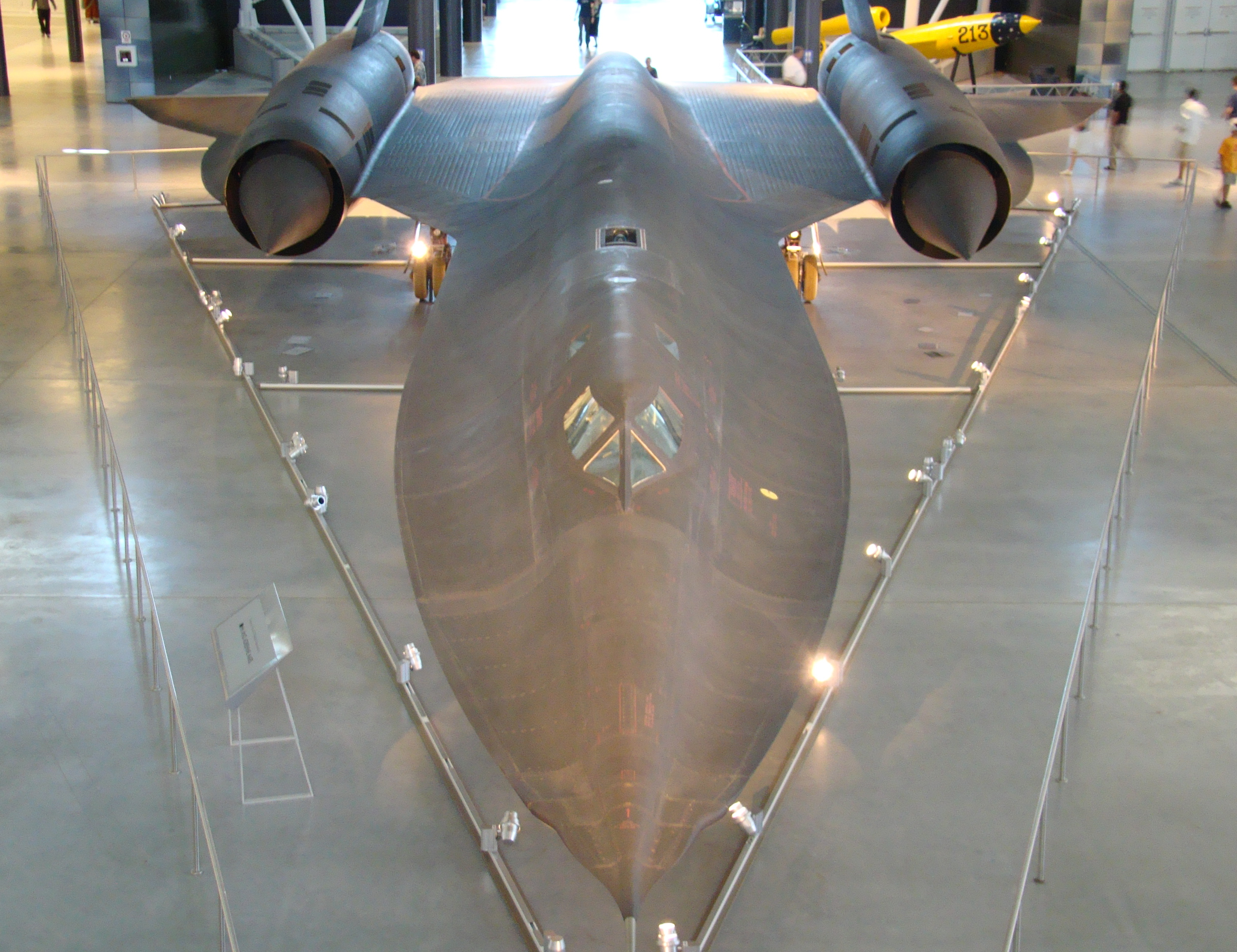
A Lockheed SR-71A Blackbird

The Gemini VII space capsule

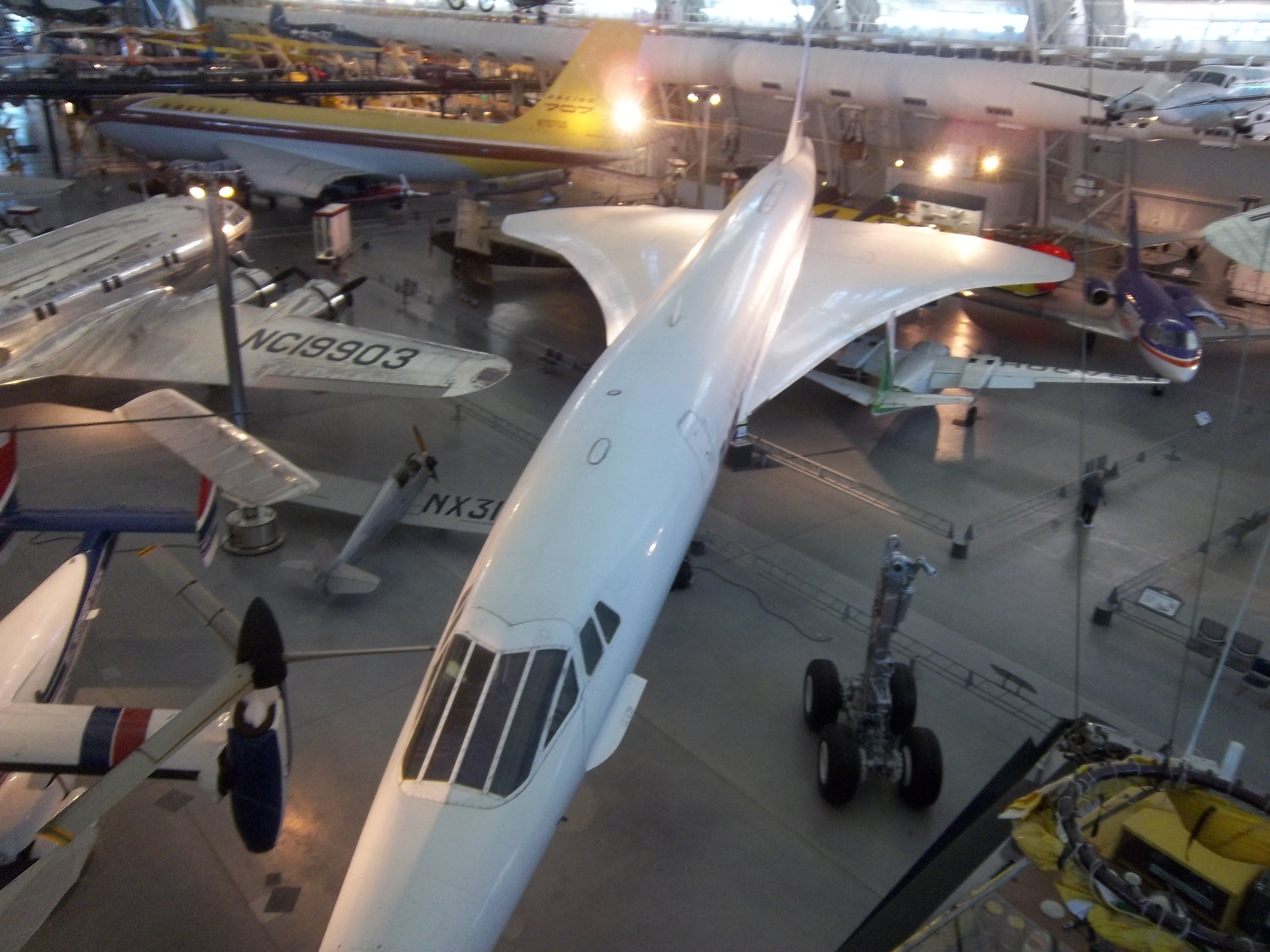
An Air France Concorde F-BVFA

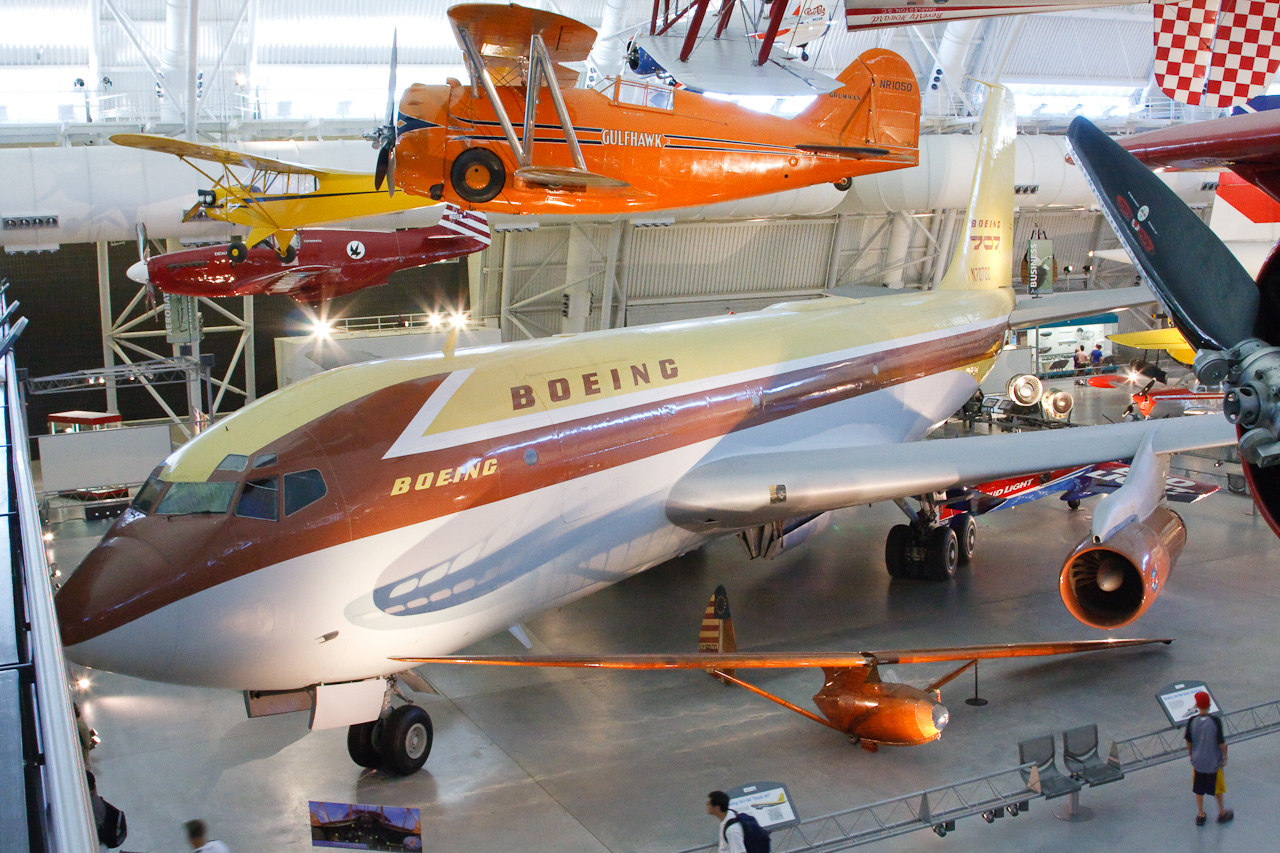
From top to bottom: Grumman G-22 Gulfhawk II, Piper J-3 Cub, North American P-51C Mustang, Boeing 367-80, and Bowlus BA-100 Baby Albatross.

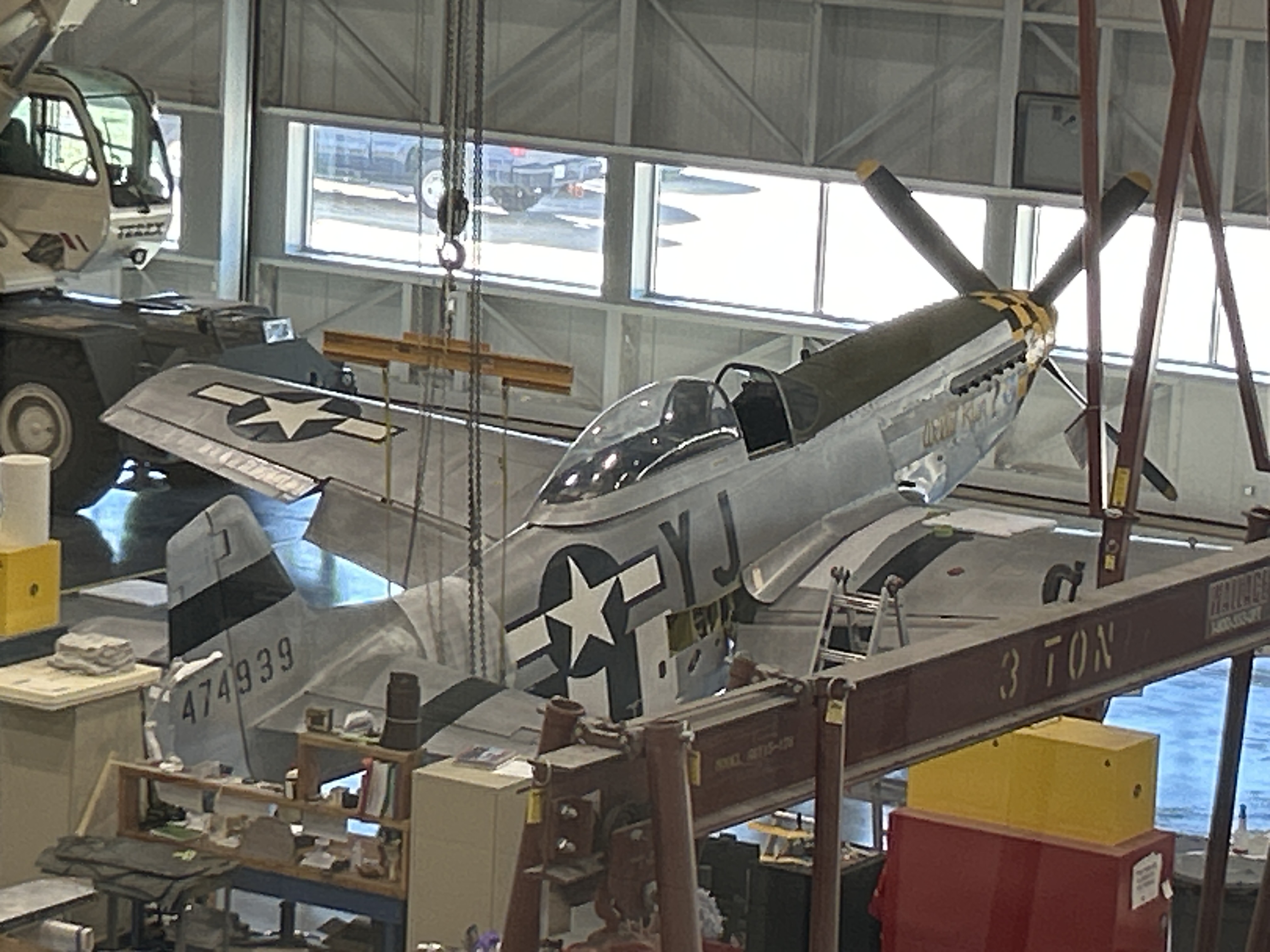
The National Air And Space Museum's P-51D Mustang Willit Run?, undergoing restoration work at the Steven F. Udvar-Hazy Center after being temporarily moved from the DC museum while the latter was being renovated.

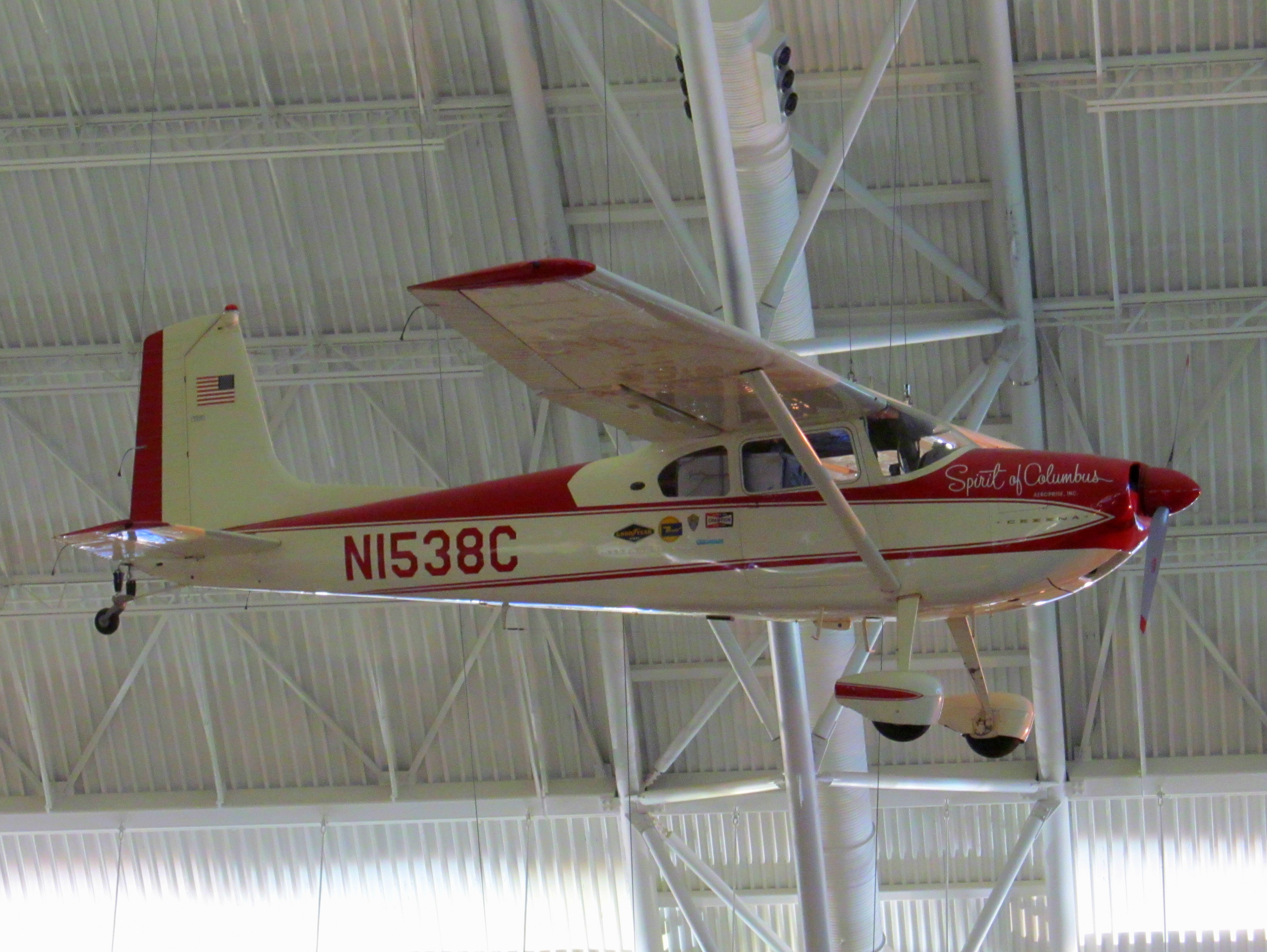
In 1964 Jerrie Mock became the first woman to fly solo around the world. Her plane, the Spirit of Columbus, hangs in the Center.

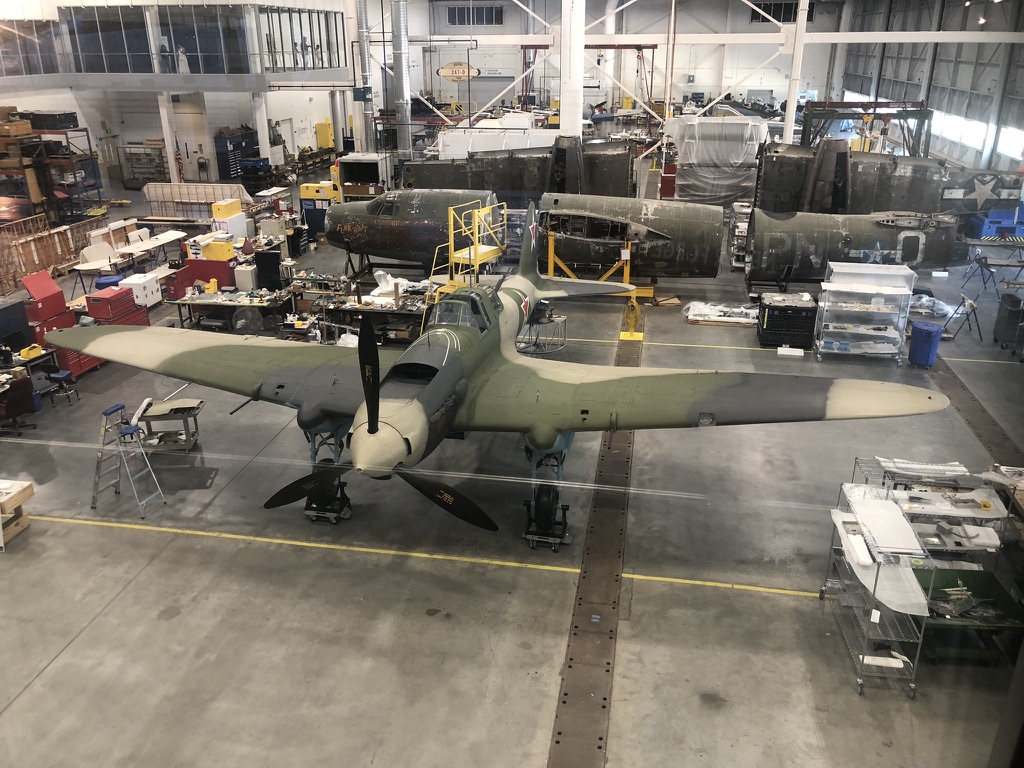
Ilyushin Il-2 and Martin B-26 Marauder Flak-Bait (background)

== See also ==
- List of aerospace museums
