= Spirit of Columbus =

Cessna 180 Skywagon that was flown around the world

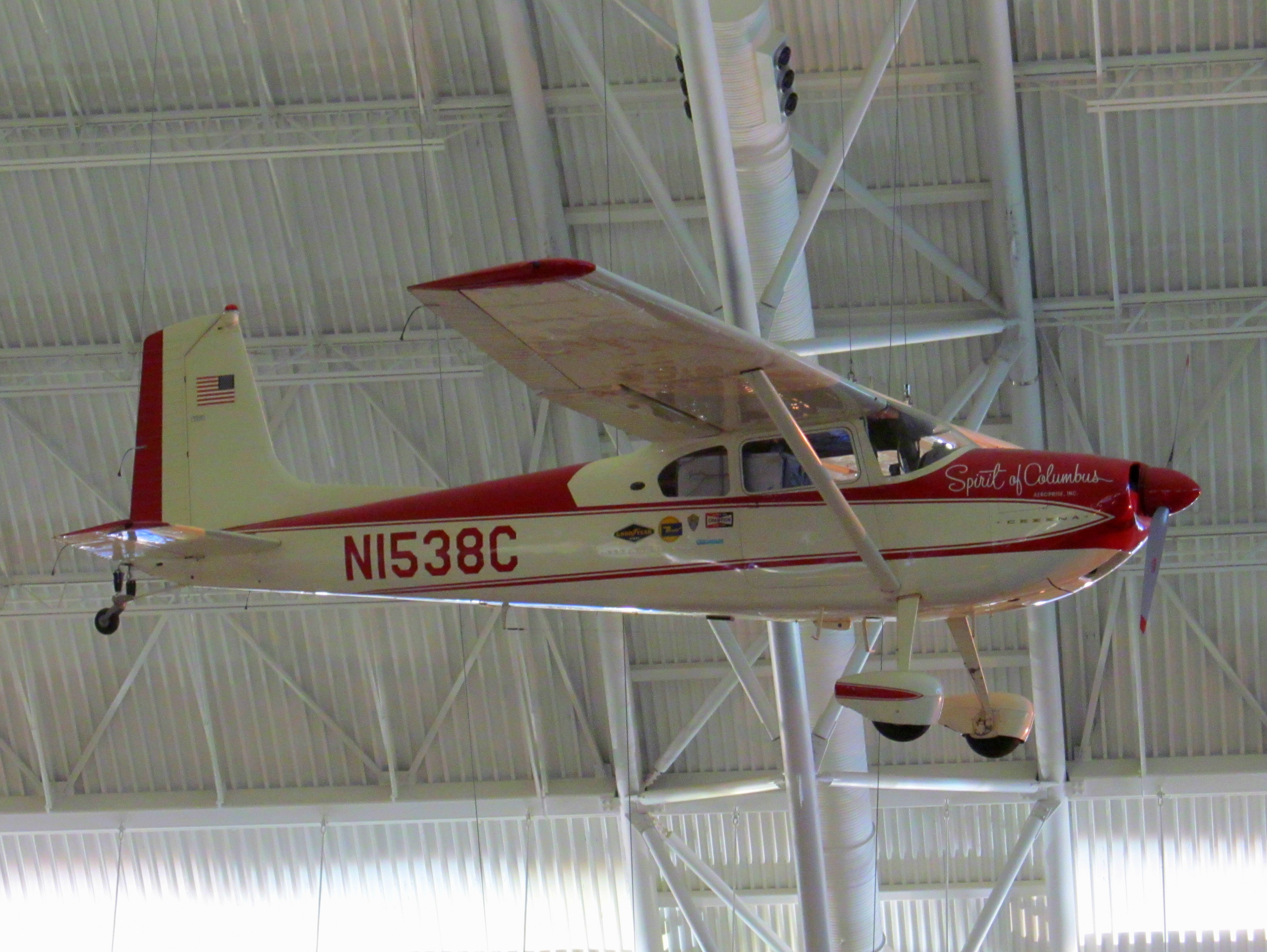
The Spirit of Columbus at the Steven F. Udvar-Hazy Center

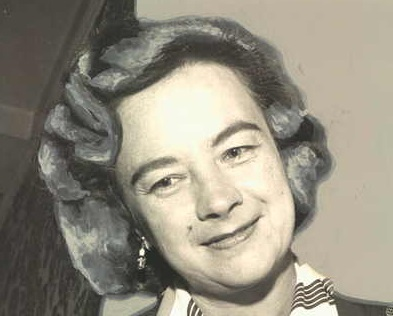
Jerrie Mock in 1964

The Spirit of Columbus is a Cessna 180 Skywagon that was flown by Geraldine "Jerrie" Fredritz Mock from March 19 to April 17, 1964, on the first solo flight by a woman around the world. She nicknamed the plane Charlie.

The trip began March 19, 1964, in Columbus, Ohio, and ended April 17, 1964, in Columbus, Ohio. It took 29 days, 11 hours and 59 minutes, with 21 stopovers and almost 22,860 miles (36,790 km). The flight was part of a "race" that developed between Jerrie Mock and Joan Merriam Smith who had flown from a field near San Francisco, CA on March 17, 1964; Smith's departure date and flight path was the same as the aviator Amelia Earhart's last flight. Although they were not in direct competition with each other, media coverage soon began tracking the progress of each pilot, fascinated with who would complete the journey first. Mock was the first to finish. The story of this race is told in a book written by Taylor Phillips entitled, Racing to Greet the Sun, Jerrie Mock and Joan Merriam Smith Duel to Become the First Woman to Solo Around the World (2015). Jerrie Mock was subsequently awarded the Louis Blériot medal from the Fédération Aéronautique Internationale in 1965. In 1970 she published the story of her round-the-world flight in the book Three-Eight Charlie. While that book is now out of print, a 50th anniversary edition was later published including maps, weather charts and photos. Three-Eight Charlie is a reference to the call sign, N1538C, of the Cessna 180 Skywagon Mock used to fly around the world.

The airplane hangs in the National Air and Space Museum of the Smithsonian. In June 2007, Mock flew to Chantilly, Virginia, to see the Spirit of Columbus for the first time in many years. Mock "was so pleased to see her plane 'airborne' again". The plane previously was in storage, but with the opening of the Udvar-Hazy Center, is now back on display.
