= Aeroflot Flight 721 =

1964 aviation accident

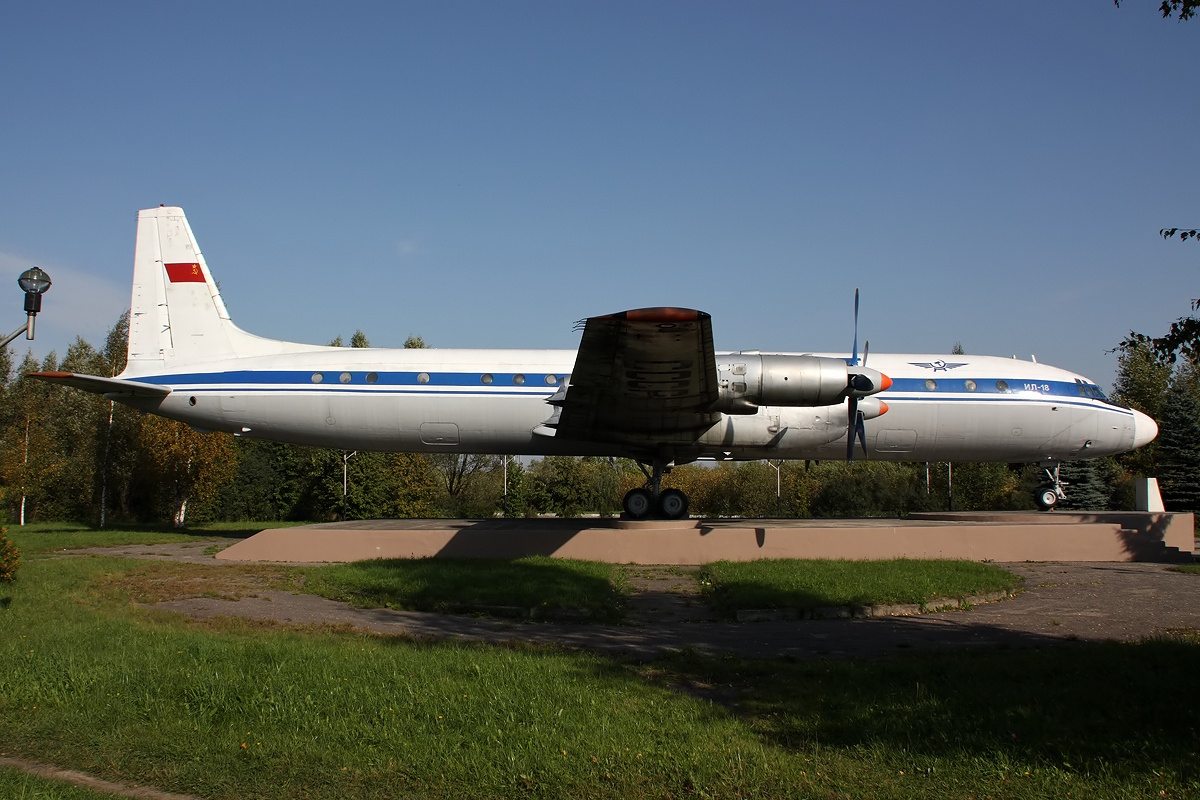
- An Aeroflot Ilyushin Il-18, similar to the crashed aircraft

Accident
- Date: 2 September 1964
- Summary: CFIT
- Site: Near Yuzhno-Sakhalinsk Airport, Yuzhno-Sakhalinsk, Sakhalin, Russian SFSR, Soviet Union

Aircraft
- Aircraft type: Ilyushin Il-18V
- Operator: Aeroflot
- Call sign: AEROFLOT 721
- Registration: CCCP-75531
- Flight origin: Sheremetyevo International Airport, Moscow
- 1st stopover: Krasnoyarsk Yemelyanovo Airport, Krasnoyarsk
- 2nd stopover: Khabarovsk Novy Airport, Khabarovsk
- Destination: Yuzhno-Sakhalinsk Airport, Yuzhno-Sakhalinsk
- Occupants: 93
- Passengers: 84
- Crew: 9
- Fatalities: 87
- Survivors: 6

Aeroflot Flight 721 was a scheduled domestic passenger flight between Moscow and Yuzhno-Sakhalinsk in the Russian SFSR. On Wednesday, 2 September 1964, the aircraft flying this route, an Ilyushin Il-18V, crashed into the side of a hill on approach to Yuzhno-Sakhalinsk, killing 87 of the 93 people on board. At the time of the accident, it was the deadliest Il-18 crash and the deadliest aviation accident on Russian soil.

== Aircraft ==
The aircraft involved in the accident was an Ilyushin Il-18V turboprop airliner registered CCCP-75531 to the Krasnoyarsk Civil Aviation Directorate of Aeroflot. At the time of the accident, it had only been in service for about a year and had logged merely 1,269 total flight hours and 358 pressurization cycles.

== Crew ==
Nine crew members were aboard the flight. The cockpit crew consisted of:

- Captain Anatoly Andrevich Smirnov
- Co-pilot Boris G. Stepanov
- Navigator Anatoly Davydovich Gilinsky
- Navigator-in-training Ivan Vasilievich Ivanov
- Flight engineer Arkady Kalayda
- Radio operator Yevgeny Petrovich Ipatov

Flight attendants Anastasia Tsebak, Lyubov Orekhova, and Nikolay Filatov worked in the cabin. All nine crew members perished in the crash.

== Synopsis ==
Flight 721's route led it eastward across Russia from Moscow to Yuzhno-Sakhalinsk, with stopovers in Khabarovsk and Krasnoyarsk. The flight changed crews at Krasnoyarsk airport and proceeded with the flight to Khabarovsk without incident.

At 20:00 the flight departed Khabarovsk en route to the final destination, Yuzhno-Sakhalinsk, carrying 84 passengers, including 17 children. After takeoff the aircraft flew the route at an altitude of 6,000 metres (20,000 ft). The flight went without incident until it began descent to Yuzhno. Clouds were present in the area and visibility was limited to 10 kilometres (6.2 mi). At 21:05 the Il-18 reported its altitude to be 2,600 metres (8,500 ft) and continued its flight towards the non-directional beacon. The air traffic controller warned the crew of an irregular southeasterly wind at a speed of 14.4 km/h in the airport area, and instructed them to take a landing course on a bearing of 10° (to the south). The crew responded by twice requesting to land on the shortest route, which was at a bearing of 190° (from the north). The controller refused their request and told them to follow the first route towards the beacon while at an altitude of 1500 meters. At 21:09, when the IL-18 was 37 kilometers from the runway and at an altitude of 1,500 metres (4,900 ft), the crew contacted the controller again. The crew again requested permission to land the shortest approach on a bearing of 190°. The controller asked the aircraft if they had enough time to do so, to which the crew answered in the affirmative. The controller relented and gave the flight permission to perform a visual approach with a right turn for the approach on a bearing of 190° and the crew confirmed receiving the permission.

At 21:10 the air traffic controller asked the flight to report back when it had reached an altitude of 600 metres (2,000 ft). The crew began a left turn of 100° to switch course after doing so the Il-18 landing gear was lowered and decreased the rate of descent to 36 km/h (2,000 fpm). In the process of doing so the crew forgot that the minimum altitude for entering the turn was 1,200 metres (3,900 ft) and they should not have exited the turn at an altitude lower than 900 metres (3,000 ft) in order to avoid colliding with a mountain ridge in the area at 790 metres (2,590 ft). It would only be safe to occupy an altitude of 600 meters once the aircraft was 12.7 km from the front of the runway. The weather was clear but was quite dark out when the Il-18 was preparing for landing. When the crew heard the command to report when they had reached 600 meters when they were still at an altitude of 1200 meters, seeing the airport lights and not further trying to calculate their position, the crew thought they were closer to the airport than anticipated and began the descent to 600 meters. The crew did not notice at the time that their bearing was at 140° (which became 151° in the process of turning) was well off from the 190° needed for the landing. When the controller informed them that he had lost the flight from radar. The controller did not notice, and hence did not inform the crew that their bearing was significantly off from the 190° for beginning the straight-in landing.

When the crew reported reaching an altitude of 600 meters the air traffic controller, still not understanding that the aircraft was not near the point where it was safe to fly at that altitude, instructed the aircraft to descend to 400 meters thinking it ready for final approach. At 21:11, 26 kilometres (16 mi) north-west of the airport, the Il-18 crashed into a wooded hillside at an elevation of 550 metres (1,800 ft) feet, killing all nine crew members and 78 of the 84 passengers. Debris from the accident spread out across a 250-meter distance; a fire broke out in the remains of the aircraft and destroyed much of what remained of the airliner. All six survivors, which included three children, were seriously injured.

== Causes ==
The official report cited pilot error and poor in-flight planning as the cause of the accident; the crew initiated descent prematurely and apparently did not have sufficient knowledge of approach conditions, and these factors combined ultimately led to the crash. The commands given by the air traffic controller at the times give were noted to have misled the crew into thinking they were closer to the runway than they actually were.
