= Jerrie Mock =

American aviation pioneer

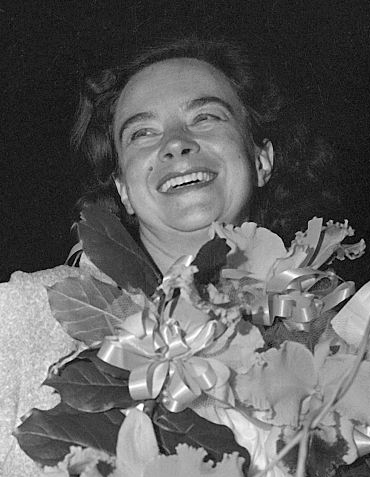
- Mock on April 17, 1964
- Born: Geraldine Lois Fredritz; November 22, 1925; Newark, Ohio, U.S.
- Died: September 30, 2014 (aged 88); Quincy, Florida, U.S.
- Spouse: Russell Mock
- Children: Valerie Armentrout, Gary Mock, Roger Mock

Geraldine "Jerrie" Fredritz Mock (November 22, 1925 – September 30, 2014) was an American pilot and the first woman to fly solo around the world. She flew a single-engine Cessna 180 (registered N1538C) christened the Spirit of Columbus and nicknamed "Charlie." The trip began March 19, 1964, in Columbus, Ohio, and ended April 17, 1964, in Columbus. It took 29 days, 11 hours and 59 minutes, with 21 stopovers and covered almost 22,860 miles (36,790 km). During the journey, Mock became the first woman to fly solo across the Pacific Ocean from west to east and the first woman to fly a single-engine plane in either direction across the Pacific.

The flight was part of a "race" that developed between Jerrie Mock and Joan Merriam Smith who had flown from a field near San Francisco, CA on March 17, 1964; Smith's departure date and flight path was the same as the aviator Amelia Earhart's last flight. Mock finished first.

In 1970 Mock published the story of her round-the-world flight in the book Three-Eight Charlie. While that book is now out of print, a 50th anniversary edition was later published including maps, weather charts and photos. Three-Eight Charlie is a reference to the tail number, N1538C, of the Cessna 180 Skywagon Mock used to fly around the world. Before her death, Mock, mother of three children, resided in Quincy, Florida, northwest of the state capital, Tallahassee.

== Early life ==
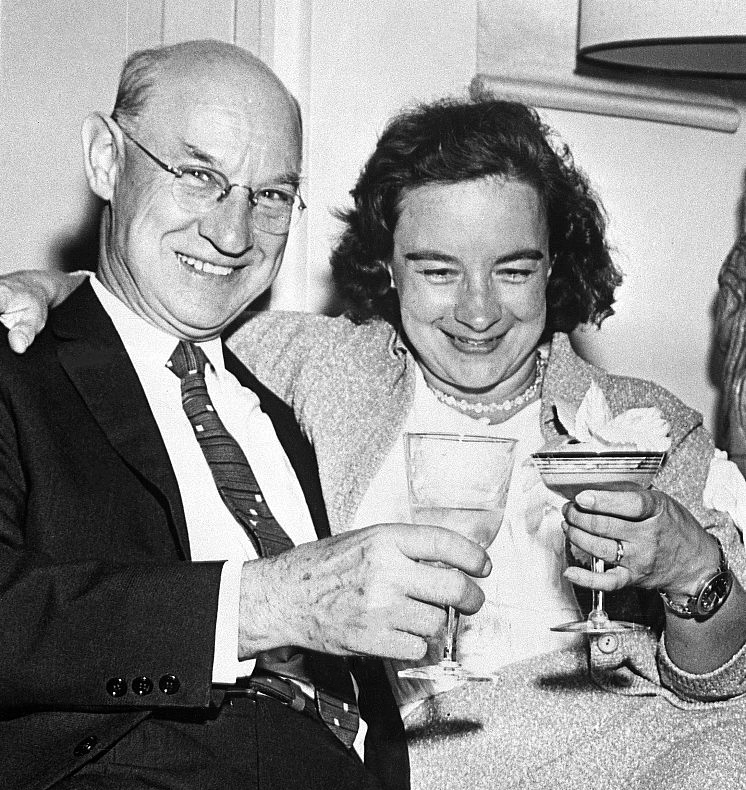
Mock with father on April 18, 1964

Geraldine "Jerrie" Fredritz Mock was born on November 22, 1925, in Newark, Ohio to Timothy and Blanche (Wright) Fredritz. Her paternal grandparents were German emigrants. During her childhood, she found that she had more in common with the boys. Her interest for flying was sparked when she was 7 years old when she and her father had the opportunity to fly in the cockpit of a Ford Trimotor airplane. In high school, she took an engineering course in which she was the only girl and decided flying was her passion. She graduated from Newark High School in 1943 and went on to attend Ohio State University. At OSU, she became a member of Phi Mu. She left her studies at OSU to wed her husband, Russell Mock, in 1945.

== Flight around the world ==
Mock's flight began and ended at Ohio hometown's Port Columbus Airport. Her expedition's financing included a loan from The Columbus Dispatch newspaper. She travelled eastbound, over Morocco, Saudi Arabia, and Vietnam, among other countries. After stressful days traveling over the Atlantic, Mock was greeted by the president of the Aero Club of Morocco and stayed the night in a French home, where Mock reports, "there were no nightmares of thunderheads over the Atlantic. Dressed in red satin, I danced in marble palaces." Mock later journeyed to Saudi Arabia, where she landed at Dhahran Airport. In her book Three-Eight Charlie, Mock says that after landing in Saudi Arabia the crowd of men around her looked puzzled. One of the men approached her aircraft. “His white-kaffiyeh-covered head nodded vehemently, and he shouted to the throng that there was no man. This brought a rousing ovation”, she recalled. Mock was quite a spectacle in Saudi Arabia where women would not be allowed to drive cars until 2017, much less fly a plane. In Egypt, she mistakenly landed at a secret off-the-map military base instead of the Cairo Airport.

Traveling the world gave Mock a new perspective and experiences. Flying over Vietnam, she noted: "Somewhere not far away a war was being fought, but from the sky above, all looked peaceful."

== Accomplishments and recognition ==
=== Firsts for women ===
- First woman to fly both oceans
- First woman to fly solo around the world
- First woman to fly the North Atlantic from the United States to Africa
- First woman to fly the Pacific from west to east
- First woman to fly the Pacific in both directions

=== Records ===
- 1965: Speed on close circuit of 500 km in Class C1-c
- 1966: Distance in straight line, women's record
- 1968: Distance in a close circuit, women's record
- 1968: Speed on a recognized course : (Columbus (Ohio) to San Juan (Puerto Rico), Class C1-d and women's record
- 1969: Speed on a recognized course : Oakland (California to Honolulu) Class C1-d and women's record
- Honiara to Rabaul, Class C1-d and women's record
- Honolulu to Tarawa (Kiribati) Class C1-d and women's record
- Oakland to Rabaul (Papua New Guinea) women's record
- San Juan to Columbus, Class C1-d and women's record
- Tarawa to Honiara (Guadalcanal) Class C1-d and women's record

=== Awards and honors ===
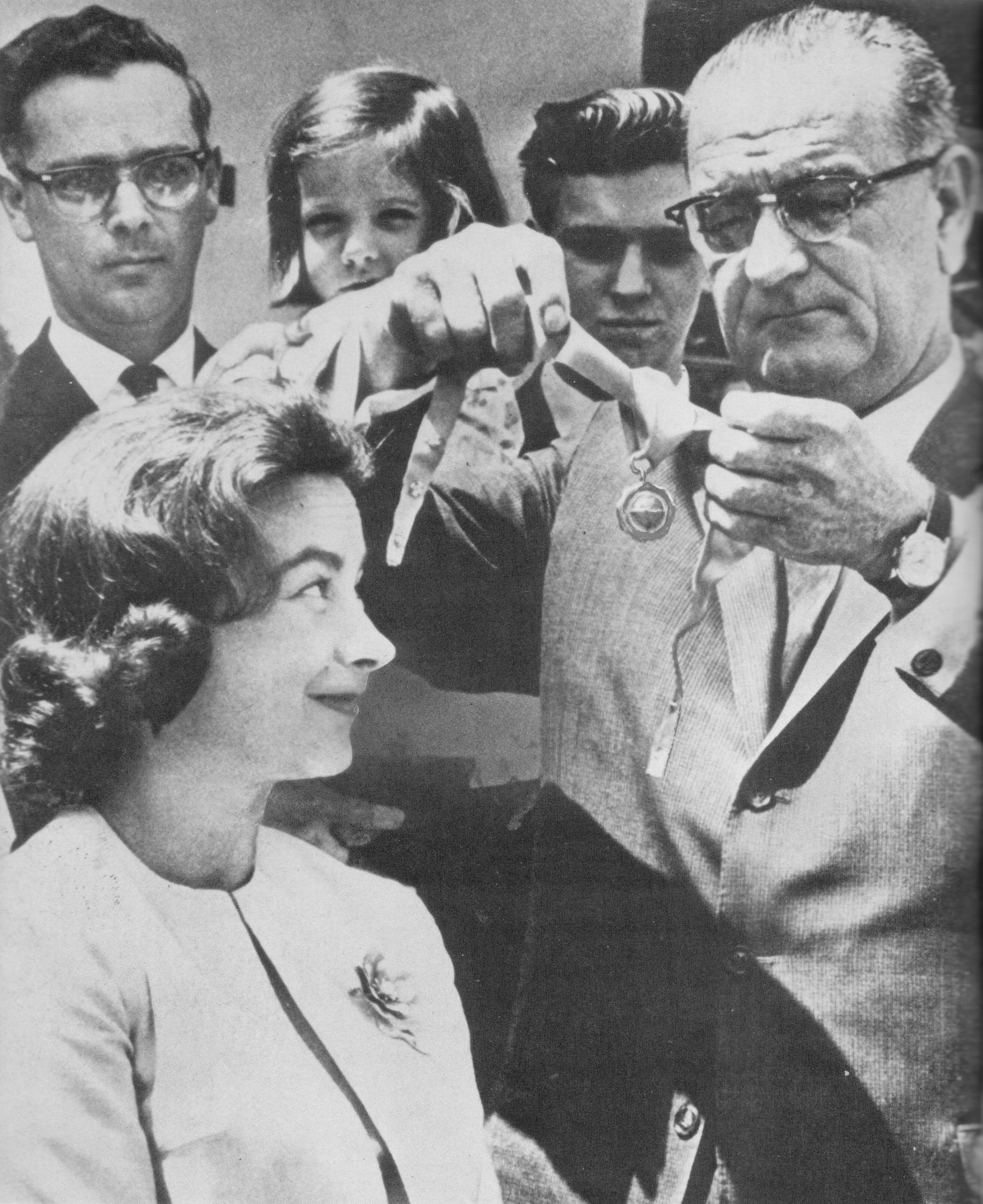
President Lyndon Johnson awards Mock the Federal Aviation Agency Gold Medal for Exceptional Service on May 4, 1964

- Amelia Earhart Memorial Award (1964)
- Federal Aviation Agency Gold Medal for Exceptional Service (1964)
- Aero Classic Aviation Progress Award (1965)
- Induction into the Ohio Women's Hall of Fame (1979)
- Induction into the National Aviation Hall of Fame (2022)
- American Institute of Aeronautics and Astronautics Special Award
- Experimental Aircraft Association Special Award
- Glenn Hammond Curtiss Silver Medal, Pittsburgh OX-5 Club
- Louis Blériot Silver Medal (from the Fédération Aéronautique Internationale; she was the first American citizen and first woman to be awarded this)
- Women’s Aero Association of Wichita Award

=== Legacy ===
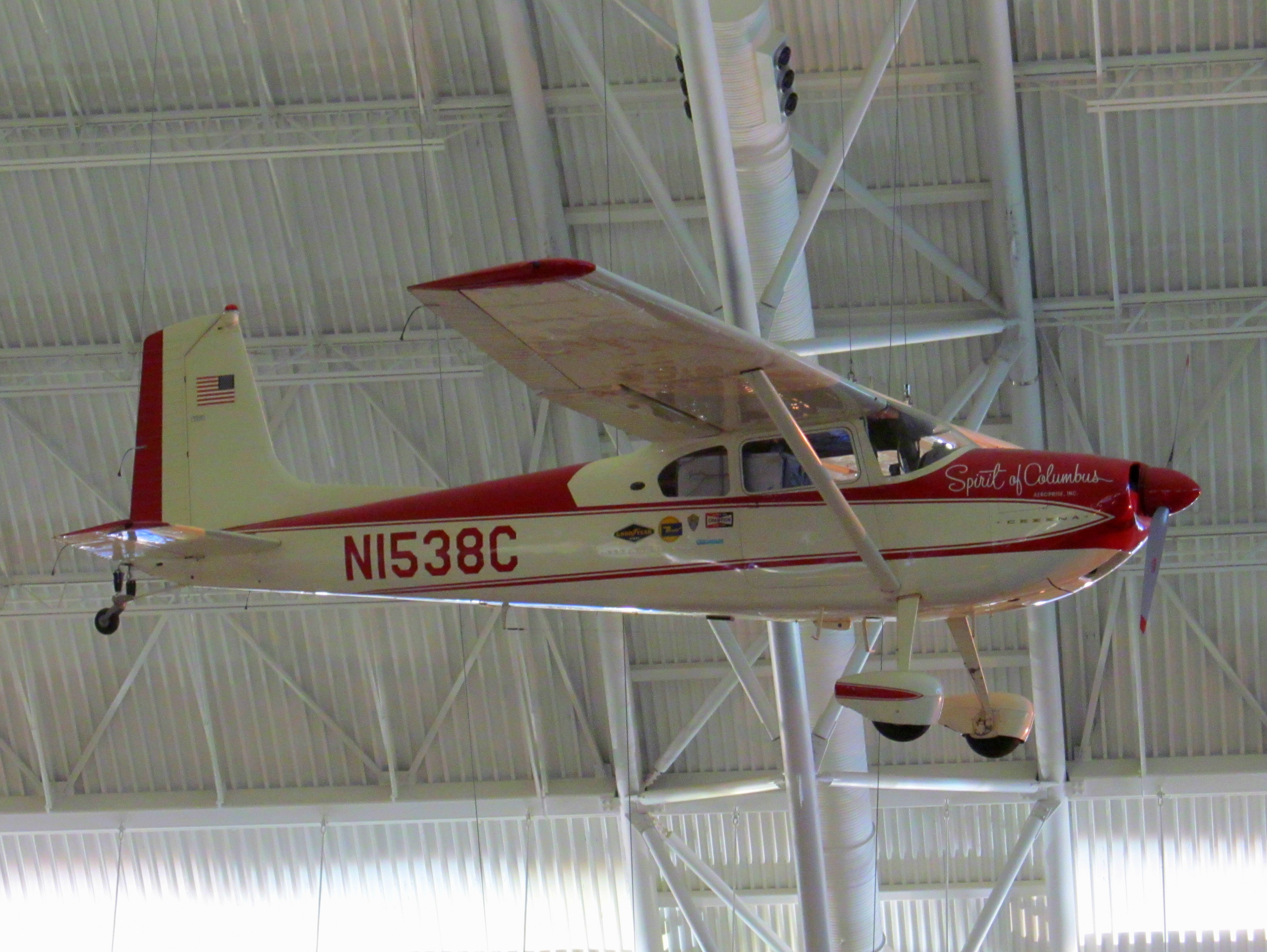
Jerrie Mock's Spirit of Columbus, a Cessna 180, is displayed at the National Air and Space Museum.

Mock's Cessna 180 which she flew around the world, the Spirit of Columbus, hangs in the National Air and Space Museum of the Smithsonian Institution. In June 2007, Mock flew there (to Chantilly, Virginia), to see The Spirit of Columbus for the first time in many years. Mock "was so pleased to see her plane 'airborne' again".

September 14, 2013 was declared Jerrie Mock Day by an official proclamation from Newark, Ohio mayor Jeff Hall.

A life-size bronze sculpture of Mock, sculpted by Renate Burgyan Fackler, was unveiled in the courtyard of The Works museum in Newark, Ohio on September 14, 2013. Mock's younger sister, Susan Reid, modeled for the statue while wearing Mock's knit skirt, sweater, and leather shoes that she had worn on her round-the-world flight. According to Wendy Hollinger, the publisher who reissued Mock's book about her flight, Mock did not especially like skirts, but "was in a skirt because she thought it would be socially acceptable, especially in the Middle East."

== Death ==
Mock died in her home in Quincy, Florida on September 30, 2014. Her ashes were flown in a Cessna 180.

== See also ==
- Circumnavigation
- Grace Marguerite Hay Drummond-Hay
- List of American women's firsts
- List of firsts in aviation
- List of women's firsts
- Wiley Post
