= 1968 in aviation =

This is a list of aviation-related events from 1968.

== Events ==
- In the 1968, White Paper on Defence, the British Labour government announces that the Royal Navy's aircraft carrier force will be phased out as soon as the United Kingdom has completed its withdrawal from Malaysia, Singapore, and the Persian Gulf, scheduled for the end of 1971.
- The original Golden West Airlines is founded, headquartered at Van Nuys, California.
- Bonanza Air Lines, Pacific Air Lines, and West Coast Airlines merge to form Air West. It will be renamed Hughes Airwest in 1970.

=== January ===
- North Vietnamese Antonov An-2 utility biplanes conduct bombing raids into Laos and fly night missions against ships and craft of the South Vietnamese Navy.
- After the Soviet Union complains about damage to a Soviet merchant ship in Haiphong Harbor by American air attack, President Lyndon B. Johnson's administration promises to make every effort to avoid a recurrence of such damage.
- January 1 – East Germany – the German Democratic Republic (GDR) – abolishes its national civil aviation authority, the Hauptverwaltung der Zivilen Luftfahrt (Central Administration for Civil Aviation), and replaces it with the Staatliche Luftfahrt-Inspektion der DDR (Public Department of Aviation of the GDR), which assumes its functions.
- January 6 – Aeroflot Flight 1668, an Antonov An-24B (registration CCCP-47733) breaks up at an altitude of 4,500 meters (14,800 feet) and crashes 92 km (57 mi) from Olyokma in the Soviet Union′s Russian Soviet Federated Socialist Republic, killing all 45 people on board. An errant antiaircraft missile is suspected of having accidentally shot it down.
- January 8 – A United States Marine Corps CH-53A #65-100 crashed in the Hải Lăng Forest, South Vietnam, killing all 46 personnel on board.
- January 10 – A United States Navy C-54P Skymaster encounters severe turbulence, goes into an uncontrolled descent, crashes into Mount Tobin in Pershing County, Nevada, 300 feet (91 meters) below its summit, and slides 1,000 feet (300 meters) down the mountain's side, killing all 19 people on board.
- January 16 – A U.S. Navy Lockheed P-3A-50-LO Orion crashes into a mountain near Iwakuni, Japan, killing all 12 people on board.
- January 17 – A United States Air Force KC-135A-BN Stratotanker overrotates during takeoff from Minot Air Force Base, North Dakota, in a snowstorm, stalls, and crashes, killing all 13 people on board. United States Air Force Major General Charles M. Eisenhart is among the dead.
- January 18–19 (overnight) – A U.S. Navy UH-2 Seasprite piloted by Lieutenant Junior Grade Clyde E. Lassen makes a daring rescue of downed fliers in North Vietnam. For his actions, Lassen will become the only U.S. Navy helicopter pilot to be awarded the Medal of Honor during the Vietnam War.
- January 19 – A C-130 Hercules of U.S. Navy Air Transport Squadron 24 (VR-24) and U.S. Navy helicopters from Naval Air Station Sigonella, Italy, deliver relief supplies to 40,000 people rendered homeless around Montevago by the Belice earthquake in western Sicily.
- January 21 – A United States Air Force B-52 Stratofortress carrying four nuclear weapons crashes in the sea near Thule Air Base in Greenland.
- January 27 – The left wing of an Air Comores de Havilland DH.114 Heron (registration F-OCED) strikes a light alongside the runway while landing at Prince Said Ibrahim International Airport in Moroni, Comoros. The plane climbs with its flaps down, crashes into rocks, and plunges into the Indian Ocean, killing 15 of the 16 people on board.

=== February ===
- February 1 – The Royal Canadian Air Force and Royal Canadian Navy are disestablished as they merge with the Canadian Army to form the unified Canadian Armed Forces.
- February 6 – A United States Navy P-3B Orion flying an antisubmarine patrol crashes into the Gulf of Thailand 50 nautical miles (93 kilometres) off Phú Quốc island, South Vietnam, killing all 12 people on board.
- February 7 – An Indian Air Force Antonov An-12BP (NATO reporting name "Cub") flying over India in deteriorating weather crashes at an altitude of 17,324 feet (5,280 meters) on Dhaka Glacier near Chandrabhaga Peak 13, killing all 102 people on board. It is the deadliest accident involving an An-12 and at the time it is the deadliest aviation accident in Indian history. The aircraft's wreckage is not found until August 2003.
- February 7 – A Standard Airways Boeing 707-138B, registration N791SA, operating Canadian Pacific Air Lines flight CP322 from Honolulu with 9 crew and 52 passengers on board, crashed on landing in fog at Vancouver, British Columbia, Canada. The aircraft veered off the runway and hit several small aircraft before coming to rest with its nose embedded in a building. A member of the cabin crew died, as did an airport employee. While there was no fire, the aircraft was a writeoff. The crew was fatigued, the captain made an unwise decision to continue landing in poor visibility conditions and it was unclear who was in control of the aircraft in its last moments.
- February 9 – Claiming to be a civilian employee of a U.S. airline, 19-year-old United States Marine Corps 1st Marine Division Private First Class William Lee Clark is allowed to board a Pan Am Douglas DC-6 with 83 people on board as it prepares to depart Da Nang Airport in Da Nang, South Vietnam, for a charter flight carrying U.S. military personnel to Hong Kong for rest and recreation. He enters the cockpit brandishing a pistol and orders the flight crew to fly him to Hong Kong as well. They shut down the engines but restart them when he threatens to shoot them. During 2 hours and 45 minutes of negotiations, he releases all the passengers, after which the commander of U.S. military forces in Vietnam, United States Army General William Westmoreland, orders tear gas to be shot into the plane. With Clark distracted by the tear gas attack, the copilot disarms and overpowers him.
- February 10 – .50-caliber (12.7-mm) machine gun fire hits a U.S. Marine Corps KC-130F Hercules carrying a cargo of flamethrowers and rubber bladders filled with jet fuel while it is on final approach to Khe Sanh, South Vietnam, setting one of the fuel bladders and one of its engines on fire. The pilot lands the plane at Khe Sanh, but the rubber bladders explodes into flames after the plane touches down, killing eight of the 11 people on board.
- February 16 – A Civil Air Transport Boeing 727-92C lands short of the runway at Taipei Songshan Airport in Taipei, Taiwan, rolls for 200 meters (660 feet), becomes airborne again, then crashes into trees and a farmhouse, killing 21 of the 63 people on board and one person on the ground.
- February 17 – Deciding that he is a Communist who hates the United States, 31-year-old Thomas Boynton charters a Piper Apache to fly him from Marathon to Miami, Florida, then points a gun at the pilot's head shortly after takeoff and orders him to fly to Havana, Cuba, instead. Boynton requests political asylum upon arrival in Havana, but Cuban authorities arrest him and he will spend 20 months in Cuba, mostly in jail. He will be allowed to travel to Canada in October 1969 and will return to the United States in November 1969.
- February 21 – Seven minutes after Delta Air Lines Flight 843 – a Douglas DC-8 with 109 people on board, including professional golfer Barbara Romack, bound for Palm Beach, Florida – takes off from Tampa International Airport in Tampa, Florida – Lawrence Rhodes pulls a pistol on a female flight attendant and forces it to fly to Havana, Cuba. After the airliner spends three hours on the ground at Havana, Cuban authorities allow it to return to the United States.
- February 24 – A Royal Air Lao Douglas DC-3 strikes a mountain and crashes into the Mekong River near Ban Napa, Laos, about 100 miles (160 km) north of Vientiane, killing everyone on board. The number of people on board is somewhere between 22 and 37, according to different sources.
- February 29 – Aeroflot Flight 15, an Ilyushin Il-18D (registration CCCP-74252), experiences an in-flight emergency at an altitude of 8,000 meters (26,000 feet). Its crew initiates an emergency descent, but the airliner breaks up in mid-air as it passes through 10,000 feet (3,000 meters) and crashes in flames 13 km (8.1 mi) northwest of Parchum in the Irkutsk Region of the Soviet Union′s Russian Soviet Federated Socialist Republic, killing 83 of the 84 people on board. Miraculously, one passenger survives, falling to earth with a large piece of airframe skin.

=== March ===
- The U.S. Air Force conducts reconnaissance flights over South Vietnam and Laos using Lockheed U-2s and over North Vietnam using SR-71 Blackbirds.
- The United States plans air strikes against North Korea in retaliation for the January 30 North Korean seizure of the United States Navy technical research ship USS Pueblo (AGER-2), but then cancels them.
- March 5
  - Three hijackers commandeer an Avianca Douglas C-54A-15-DC Skymaster (registration HK-136) with 32 people on board during a domestic flight in Colombia from Valledupar to Barranquilla and force it to fly to Santiago de Cuba in Cuba.
  - After the flight crew of Air France Flight 212, a Boeing 707-328C (registration F-BLCJ), mistakes the lights of Basse Terre, Guadeloupe, for those of Pointe-à-Pitre and begins its descent to a night landing at Pointe-à-Pitre International Airport on the wrong course, the airliner crashes into the volcano La Soufriere on Guadeloupe, killing all 63 people on board.
- March 6 – After a Republic of Vietnam Air Force C-123K Provider carrying troops and spare parts aborts its approach to Khe Sanh, South Vietnam, because of a light plane on the runway and circles for another approach, ground fire shoots it down. The C-123K spirals into the ground, killing all 49 people on board.
- March 7 – Aeroflot Flight 3153, a Tupolev Tu-124 (registration CCCP-45019) stalls and crashes just after takeoff from Volgograd Airport in Volgograd in the Soviet Union after its crew inadvertently activates its spoilers. The airliner is destroyed and one crew member dies, but the other 48 people on board survive.
- March 8
  - After Air Manila International Flight 507, a Fairchild F-27 (registration PI-C871) flies into a cumulonimbus cloud, it encounters severe turbulence, loses both horizontal stabilizers and part of its right wing, catches fire, and crashes into the Sibuyan Sea off Ibajay in the Western Visayas in the Philippines, killing all 14 people on board.
  - The United States Army announces that Bell Helicopter's Model 206A has won the Light Observation Helicopter competition. It will go into production for the Army as the Bell OH-58 Kiowa.
- March 9 – When the flight crew of a French Air Force Douglas DC-6B fails to follow the normal procedure of turning out over the Indian Ocean after takeoff from Gillot Airport on Réunion and instead flies in a straight line, the aircraft crashes into a hill, killing 16 of the 17 people on board. The Chief of the Defence Staff of France, General Charles Ailleret, is among the dead.
- March 12 – Two armed men hijack National Airlines Flight 28, a Douglas DC-8 flying from Tampa to Miami, Florida, with 58 people on board, and force it to fly them to Havana, Cuba. They exit the plane in Havana with a Mexican man they appear to have taken as a hostage.
- March 21 – Three hijackers commandeer an Avensa Convair CV-440 during a domestic flight in Venezuela from Caracas to Maracaibo and force it to fly them to Cuba.
- March 24 – Aer Lingus Flight 712, a Vickers Viscount 803, crashes into St. George's Channel off Tuskar Rock, County Wexford, Ireland, killing all 61 people on board. No cause for the crash is ever determined.
- March 27
  - The first person in space and first to orbit the Earth, Soviet cosmonaut Yuri Gagarin, is one of two people killed in the crash of a Mikoyan-Gurevich MiG-15UTI (NATO reporting name "Fagot") two-seat trainer 48 kilometers (30 miles) east of Moscow.
  - A modern new terminal opens at Cyprus's only airport, Nicosia International Airport, with a capacity to handle 800 passengers and 11 airliners at one time. It will remain in use only until July 1974, when the Turkish invasion of Cyprus forces the permanent closure and abandonment of the airport.

=== April ===
- The African Airlines Association is founded.
- April 1 – A United States Navy P-3B-90-LO Orion flying a surveillance patrol over the Gulf of Thailand comes under fire by a Royal Cambodian Navy vessel near Hon Doc in the Hà Tiên Islands. The plane is damaged, and one of its engines catches fire. The fire gets out of control, and the P-3B crashes off the island of Hon Vang, off Phú Quốc, South Vietnam, killing all 12 people on board.
- April 3 – President Lyndon B. Johnson's administration restricts American bombing of North Vietnam to targets south of the 19th Parallel.
- April 5 – To protest against the lack of an aerial display to commemorate the 50th anniversary of the founding of the Royal Air Force four days earlier and to demonstrate against the government of Prime Minister Harold Wilson, Flight Lieutenant Alan Pollock of the RAF's No. 1(F) Squadron makes an unauthorised display flight in a Hawker Hunter during which he "beats up" (i.e., buzzes) several RAF airfields and flies low over London, where circles the Houses of Parliament, dips his wings to the Royal Air Force Memorial, and flies under the top span of Tower Bridge, becoming the first person to fly under the bridge's upper span in a jet aircraft. He is arrested upon his return to base.
- April 8
  - An engine falls off the BOAC Boeing 707-465 G-ARWE, operating as Flight 712, seconds after takeoff from London Heathrow Airport in England, setting the wing on fire. The aircraft makes a perfect emergency landing, but the fire then spreads, killing five and injuring 38 of the 127 people on board. Among the injured are Israeli ambassador to the Soviet Union Katriel Katz and pop singer Mark Wynter. For her heroism in evacuating passengers before herself dying in the fire, flight attendant Barbara Jane Harrison posthumously receives the George Cross, while Chief Steward Nevile Davis-Gordon receives the British Empire Medal for Gallantry and air traffic controller John Davis is appointed a Member of the Order of the British Empire.
  - Ladeco Flight 213, a Douglas C-49K (registration CC-CBM), crashes in the Emperador Guillermo Mountains 24 km (15 mi) north-northwest of Coyhaique, Chile, while on approach to Balmaceda Airport in Balmaceda, Chile, killing all 36 people on board.
- April 10 – A Douglas R4D-3 initiating service on a new domestic route in Mexico for Aerovias Rojas from Aguascalientes to Mexico City crashes near Villa del Carbón, killing all 18 people on board.
- April 14–19 – Over 100 U.S. Air Force B-52 Stratofortress sorties, 200 U.S. Air Force and U.S. Marine Corps tactical aircraft sorties, and numerous aerial rocket artillery missions strike enemy positions in South Vietnam's A Shau Valley.
- April 19
  - The United States Army's 1st Cavalry Division (Airmobile) begins Operation Delaware in the A Shau Valley in South Vietnam, a helicopter-borne assault on North Vietnamese Army forces there. Facing heavy antiaircraft fire, it loses 10 helicopters shot down and 13 more damaged on the first day of the operation.
  - A Royal Air Force Avro Shackleton MR.2 (WB833) climbing through mist during an antisubmarine exercise crashes on Glenmanuilt Hill, Mull of Kintyre, Scotland, killing all 11 people on board.
- April 20 – South African Airways Flight 228, the Boeing 707-344C Pretoria, crashes just after takeoff from J. G. Strijdom International Airport in Windhoek, South-West Africa (now Namibia), killing 123 of the 128 people on board. It remains the deadliest aviation accident in the history of Namibia.
- April 21 – National Airlines retires the last of its Lockheed L-188A Electra propjets and becomes an all-jet airline, operating a fleet of Douglas DC-8 and Boeing 727 airliners.
- April 22 – An Aeroflot Ilyushin Il-18V on a training flight strikes overhead power lines and crashes near Moskva Domodedovo Airport outside Moscow, killing all five people on board.
- April 28 – A Beechcraft 65 Queen Air crashes and burns near Beaumont, Texas, killing all seven people on board – all six members of the Lamar Tech track team and the pilot.
- April 29 – The Royal Netherlands Navy decommissions its last aircraft carrier, HNLMS Karel Doorman (R81). She will be sold to Argentina on October 15.
- April 30 – A Pakistan Air Force Lockheed L-100 Hercules breaks up in turbulence and crashes near PAF Base Chaklala in Chaklala, Pakistan, killing all 22 people on board.

=== May ===
- The United States begins to use the AGM-78 Standard Antiradiation Missile (ARM) against North Vietnamese SA-2 Guideline surface-to-air missile and antiaircraft artillery sites.
- The United States deploys electronic intelligence aircraft to Southeast Asia.
- Pan Am serves 122 airports, more than any other U.S. airline. Frontier Airlines is second, serving 100 airports.
- May 3 – Braniff Flight 352, a Lockheed L-188A Electra, breaks up in midair after flying into a severe thunderstorm and crashes near Dawson, Texas, killing all 85 people on board. Among the dead is Joseph E. Lockridge of the Texas House of Representatives.
- May 5 – A Grumman Gulfstream II becomes the first executive jet to cross the Atlantic Ocean.
- May 6 – During a flight at Ellington Air Force Base in Houston, Texas, astronaut Neil Armstrong ejects from the Lunar Landing Research Vehicle LLRV–1 at an altitude of about 200 feet (60 m) after the LLRV becomes uncontrollable. LLRV–1 crashes and is destroyed, but Armstrong parachutes to earth uninjured. The incident prompts the Johnson Space Flight Center to retire the surviving LLRV (LLRV-2).
- May 7 – The wing of a Royal Air Force Armstrong Whitworth AW.660 Argosy C.1 strikes an obstruction as the aircraft conducts a flypast at RAF El Adem in Libya. The Argosy crashes onto the runway, cartwheels, and bursts into flames, killing all 11 people on board.
- May 12 – Participating in the evacuation of South Vietnamese civilians from the camp at Kham Duc, South Vietnam, during the Battle of Kham Duc, a United States Air Force C-130B Hercules takes off from the Kham Duc airstrip under heavy North Vietnamese Army fire. It is shot down immediately after takeoff and crashes about a mile (1.6 km) from the end of the runway, killing all 155 people on board. It is the deadliest aircraft crash in history at the time.
- May 16 – Air Micronesia begins flight operations.
- May 17 – Operation Delaware in South Vietnam's A Shau Valley comes to an end. The U.S. Army's 1st Cavalry Division (Airmobile) has captured a large amount of North Vietnamese equipment and supplies but has faced the heaviest enemy antiaircraft fire it has encountered thus far in the Vietnam War, losing 21 helicopters shot down during the operation.
- May 22 – Los Angeles Airways Flight 841, a Sikorsky S-61L, crashes in a dairy farm in Paramount, California, killing all 23 people on board. It was the worst helicopter accident in the history of the United States at the time.
- May 23 – A ship-launched surface-to-air missile destroys an enemy aircraft for the first time in history when the U.S. Navy guided-missile cruiser USS Long Beach (CGN-9) shoots down a North Vietnamese MiG flying over North Vietnam with a RIM-8 Talos missile at a range of 65 nautical miles (75 statute miles; 120 km). It is the first of three North Vietnamese aircraft shot down by Talos missiles during the Vietnam War.
- May 25 – A Soviet Air Force Tupolev Tu-16 (NATO reporting name "Badger-F") buzzes the United States Navy anti-submarine warfare carrier USS Essex (CVS-9) in the Norwegian Sea. On its fourth pass, its wing strikes the water and it crashes with no survivors.
- May 28 – Garuda Indonesian Airways Flight 892, a Convair CV-990-30A-5 (registration PK-GJA), crashes near Nala Sopara minutes after takeoff from Santacruz Airport in Bombay, India, killing all 29 people on board and one person on the ground.

=== June ===
- The 101st Airborne Division is redesignated as the U.S. Army's second airmobile division and renamed the 101st Airborne Division (Airmobile). Its conversion into an airmobile division will not be complete for a year.
- June 5 – North Vietnam demands an unconditional end to American bombing of its territory.
- June 12 – After the flight crew of Pan Am Flight 1, the Boeing 707-321C Clipper Caribbean (registration N798PA), misunderstands the barometric pressure sent to them by air traffic control while on approach to Dum Dum Airport in Calcutta, India, and sets their instruments to the wrong pressure, giving them false altitude readings, the airliner descends too quickly, strikes a tree, and crashes 1,128 meters (3,701 feet) short of the runway. The crash results in a hull loss of the aircraft and kills six of the 63 people on board.
- June 18 – After a missed approach to San Sebastián Airport in San Sebastián, Spain, in poor weather during a demonstration flight for Italian industrialist Lino Zanussi, a Piaggio PD.808 (registration I-PIAI) fails to follow established procedures by turning right instead of left. It crashes into the Jaizkibel mountains, killing all six people on board, including Zanussi.
- June 19 – Fifteen minutes after taking off from Santo Domingo in the Dominican Republic for a flight to Curaçao with 81 people on board, a Viasa Douglas DC-9 is hijacked and forced to fly to Santiago de Cuba in Cuba.
- June 26 – Flying Tiger Line takes delivery of its first Douglas DC-8.
- June 29 – A hijacker commandeers Southeast Airlines Flight 101 during a flight from Miami to Key West, Florida, with 17 people on board and forces it to fly him to Cuba.

=== July ===
- July 1
  - Seaboard World Airlines Flight 253A, a chartered Douglas DC-8 Super 63CF carrying 214 American troops on their way to South Vietnam and a crew of 24, strays into Soviet airspace during a flight from Seattle, Washington, to Yokota Air Base in Japan. Soviet MiG-17 (NATO reporting name "Fresco") fighters intercept the DC-8 and force it to land at Burevestnik airfield on Iturup Island in the Kurile Islands, where it spends two days before being allowed to proceed to Japan.
  - A Lockheed L-1049G Super Constellation operated by the International Red Cross crashes short of the airstrip at Uli, Nigeria, in poor weather conditions, killing one of the four people on board and destroying 10 1/2 tons of medical supplies destined for Biafra.
  - Homesick for his native Cuba since arriving in the United States in July 1967, Mario Velazquez uses a .38-caliber revolver he smuggled aboard in a milk carton to hijack Northwest Orient Airlines Flight 714 – a Boeing 727-051 (registration N475US) with 92 people on board – as it descends toward Miami, Florida, at the end of a flight from Chicago, Illinois, demanding to be flown to Cuba. Escorted by United States Air Force fighters – unknown to its flight crew, because the fighters never make visual or radio contact with the airliner – the plane lands at José Martí International Airport in Havana, Cuba, becoming the first Boeing 727 ever to land in Cuba. Cuban soldiers board the airliner and arrest Velazquez. Cuban authorities allow the Boeing 727 and its crew to return to the United States on the morning of July 2, but require the passengers to transfer by bus to Varadero Airport in Varadero, Cuba, where they board an Airlift International Douglas DC-7C without enough seats for all them for the flight back to the United States, and they arrive at Miami early on the afternoon of July 2.
- July 3 – A BKS Air Transport Airspeed Ambassador carrying eight racehorses belonging to businessman William Hill crashes while landing at London Heathrow Airport in England. The aircraft cartwheels into the incomplete Heathrow Terminal 1, striking and damaging two parked and empty British European Airways Hawker Siddeley Trident 1 airliners along the way. Six of the eight people aboard the plane and all eight horses are killed.
- July 4 – A lone hijacker takes control of Trans World Airlines Flight 329, a Boeing 727 with 71 people on board flying from Kansas City, Missouri, to Las Vegas, Nevada.
- July 8 – A Saudi Arabian Airlines Convair CV-340 crashes after aborting its third approach at Dhahran International Airport due to visibility problems created by blowing dust. The crash kills all 11 people on board.
- July 12
  - Over West Virginia, 33-year-old Oran Richards pulls out a .45-caliber pistol aboard Delta Air Lines Flight 977 – a Convair CV-880 with 55 people on board flying from Baltimore, Maryland, to Houston, Texas – and points it at the first person he sees walking toward the aisle, who happens to be United States Senator James Eastland of Mississippi. Richards claims to be dying of cancer and demands to be flown to Cuba. The flight engineer talks him out of it, and Richards surrenders his gun, curls up on the floor of the cockpit and weeps.
  - As an Island City Flying Service Cessna 210 flies from Key West to Miami, Florida, 33-year-old Leonard Bendicks pulls out a gun and forces it to fly to Havana, Cuba, where he is arrested. He gives no reason for the hijacking. Cuba will deport him to Canada in September 1969, and shortly afterward he will be arrested in the United States.
- July 13 – A Sabena Boeing 707 cargo aircraft (registration OO-SJK) strikes trees and crashes on approach to Lagos Airport in Nigeria, killing all seven people on board.
- July 17 – A lone hijacker commandeers National Airlines Flight 1064, a Douglas DC-8 with 63 people on board flying from Los Angeles, California, to Miami, Florida, and forces it to fly him to Cuba.
- July 21 – Flying in poor weather, an Aeroflot Antonov An-2R (registration CCCP-32209) strays 10 km (6.2 mi) off course and crashes into a steep mountain slope at an altitude of 4,000 meters (13,000 feet), 15 km (9.3 mi) southwest of Sufi-Kurgan in the Soviet Union′s Kirghiz Soviet Socialist Republic, killing all 14 people on board.
- July 23 – History's first Palestinian hijacking of an aircraft for purposes of political extortion takes place when three members of the Al-Asifa ("The Storm") unit of the Popular Front for the Liberation of Palestine hijack El Al Flight 426, a Boeing 707 with 48 other people on board, during a flight from London Heathrow Airport in the United Kingdom to Leonardo da Vinci-Fiumicino Airport in Rome, Italy, and divert it to Algiers Airport in Dar El Beïda, Algeria, just outside Algiers. announcing that they have named the airliner Liberation of Palestine. They release the 26 non-Israeli passengers the following day and 10 more women and children five days later. They release the 12 remaining hostages unharmed on 1 September in exchange for between 16 and 24 Arab prisoners held in Israel, after which an Air France crew flies the airliner back to Israel.
- July 28 – During its descent to Recife/Guararapes International Airport in Recife, Brazil, a United States Air Force C-124C Globemaster II crashes into a 1,890-foot-tall (576-meter-tall) hill, killing all 10 people on board.
- July 30 – While its crew is practicing an emergency descent from 39,000 to 23,000 feet (11,900 to 7,000 meters) during an aerial refueling training mission, a U.S. Air Force KC-135A-BN Stratotanker′s vertical stabilizer separates from the aircraft during a sharp turn. The tanker aircraft crashes in a forest on Mount Lassen, 56 km (35 mi) east of Red Bluff, California, killing all nine people on board.

=== August ===
- The British government purchases Beagle Aircraft to ensure the continued development and production of light aircraft in the United Kingdom.
- August 2 – Drifting off course in bad weather on approach to Milan–Malpensa Airport in Italy′s Milan metropolitan area, Alitalia Flight 660, a Douglas DC-8-43 (registration I-DIWF) crashes into a wooded hillside, resulting in the aircraft's hull loss and killing 12 of the 95 people on board.
- August 3 – Flying in rain and poor visibility, Aeroflot Flight 961, an Antonov An-2 (registration CCCP-01118) crashes into a wooded slope in the Skalisty Range 7.5 km (4.7 mi) northeast of Psebai in the Soviet Union′s Russian Soviet Federated Socialist Republic, killing all 14 people on board.
- August 4 – Absent without leave from the United States Army, 27-year-old Willis Jessie kidnaps his two-year-old daughter from his ex-wife and hires a Cessna 172 to take the two of them on a sightseeing flight over Naples, Florida. Once the plane is airborne, he pulls out a pistol and orders the pilot to fly to Havana, Cuba. Jessie is imprisoned after arriving in Havana, and his daughter is placed in a foster home. They both will return to the United States in January 1969.
- August 9 – A British Eagle International Airlines Vickers 739A Viscount (registration G-ATFN) suffers a generator failure while over West Germany which makes it impossible for its crew to maintain awareness of its flight attitude. The crew loses control of the airliner, its wings and elevator fracture, and it crashes on the Nuremberg-Munich highway, breaking up on impact and killing all 48 people on board.
- August 10 – On approach to Charleston-Kanawha County Airport in Charleston, West Virginia, Piedmont Airlines Flight 230, a Fairchild FH-227B (registration N712U), strikes trees 360 feet (110 meters) from the runway threshold, then strikes up-sloping terrain 250 feet (76 meters) short of the runway and continues up the hill until it comes to rest 6 feet (1.8 meters) beyond the threshold and 50 feet (15 meters) from the right edge of the runway. The crash kills 35 of the 37 people on board – the deadliest accident involving an FH-227 – and results in the first hull loss of an FH-227.
- August 13 – Swedish Count Carl Gustav von Rosen defies Nigerian air defences to fly in supplies to the Biafran rebels
- August 14 – Los Angeles Airways Flight 417 crashes at Compton, California, resulting in the loss of 21 lives. The accident aircraft was the prototype of the Sikorsky S-61L.
- August 18 – A United Arab Airlines Antonov An-24B (registration SU-AOL) flying from Cairo to Damascus crashes into the Mediterranean Sea at 32°58′N 032°48′E – about 180 km (97 nautical miles) south of Cyprus – killing all 40 people on board.
- August 20–21 (overnight) – Soviet paratroopers seize Prague Ruzyně International Airport in Prague, Czechoslovakia, facilitating the arrival there by air of additional Soviet troops and equipment as the Soviet Union and Warsaw Pact begin their invasion of Czechoslovakia.
- August 28 – McDonnell Douglas completes the 3,000th F-4 Phantom II.
- August 31 – The Rolls-Royce RB.211 is successfully ground-tested.

=== September ===
- The United States introduces the Rockeye cluster bomb into service, employing it in the Vietnam War.
- The U.S. Navy introduces the EKA-3B Skywarrior into service, employing it over Vietnam. It is configured to serve both as an aerial tanker and as an electronic countermeasures aircraft.
- The U.S. Navy guided-missile cruiser USS Long Beach (CGN-9) shoots down a North Vietnamese MiG flying over North Vietnam with a RIM-8 Talos surface-to-air missile at a range of 61 nautical miles (70 statute miles; 113 km). It is the second of three North Vietnamese aircraft shot down by Talos missiles during the Vietnam War and the first since 23 May 1968.
- Air Moorea is formed in French Polynesia.
- September 3 – When its crew tries to descend below clouds to make a visual approach to Burgas Airport in Burgas, Bulgaria, a Bulair Ilyushin Il-18E flies into the ground, killing 47 of the 82 people on board.
- September 11
  - Air New Zealand flies T. H. Williams, Sir Charles Kingsford Smith's navigator, to Sydney to commemorate the 40th anniversary of their first trans-Tasman flight.
  - Air France Flight 1611, a Sud Aviation SE-210 Caravelle III, catches fire in mid-air and crashes into the Mediterranean Sea off Nice, France, killing all 95 people on board. Among the dead is the French Army Général de division René Cogny.
  - Wanted for a bank robbery in Ladonia, Texas, and armed with a .22-caliber Colt revolver, Charles Lavern Beasley hijacks an Air Canada Vickers Viscount with 22 people on board during a domestic flight in Canada from Saint John, New Brunswick, to Toronto, Ontario, and demands to be flown to Cuba. After the flight crew convinces him that they need to refuel first, the airliner lands at Montreal, Quebec, where Beasley releases two passengers and two stewardesses and eventually surrenders peacefully to the Royal Canadian Mounted Police.
- September 19 – A U.S. Navy F-8C Crusader fighter of Fighter Squadron 111 (VF-111) shoots down a North Vietnamese MiG fighter. It is believed to be the last American air-to-air victory in the Vietnam War until March 1970.
- September 20
  - At the Farnborough Air Show at Farnborough, Hampshire, England, six members of the French Air Force die when their Breguet 1150 Atlantic crashes while performing a demonstration of the aircraft's ability to fly on a single engine.
  - A hijacker takes control of Eastern Airlines Flight 950, a Boeing 720 with 53 people on board, during a flight from San Juan, Puerto Rico, to Miami, Florida, and forces it to fly him to Cuba.
- September 22
  - Shortly after an Avianca Boeing 727-59 (registration HK-1401) with 77 people on board takes off from Barranquilla for a domestic flight in Colombia to Cartagena, a male passenger hijacks it and forces it to fly him to Camagüey, Cuba.
  - A male passenger hijacks Avianca Flight 654, a Douglas C-54A-5-DC Skymaster (registration HK-172) with 56 people on board flying in Colombia from Barranquilla to Santa Marta, and forces it to fly him to Santiago de Cuba in Cuba.
- September 24 – After a United States Air Force Boeing KC-135A-BN Stratotanker carrying Strategic Air Command personnel from Guam to the United States develops engine trouble over the Pacific Ocean, its crew opts to divert to Wake Island Airfield on Wake Island. On final approach to Wake Island Airfield, the KC-135A contacts the ocean's surface, bounces onto the runway, strikes instrument landing system aerials, and bursts into flames, killing 11 of the 56 people on board.
- September 28 – A Pan African Airlines Douglas C-54B-1-DC Skymaster on final approach to Port Harcourt Airport in Port Harcourt, Nigeria, strikes trees and crashes in a village, killing all 57 people on board and one person on the ground. The plane's cargo of munitions explodes, causing a massive fire.
- September 29 – A Grumman Goose on a routine air taxi flight in California from Los Angeles to Santa Catalina Island piloted by test pilot Bill Bridgeman crashes into the Pacific Ocean, killing Bridgeman. His body is never found.
- September 30 – The first Boeing 747 is rolled out.

=== October ===
- Air Jamaica is established. It will begin flight operations in April 1969.
- October 1 – A United States Air Force KC-135A-BN Stratotanker loses power in one engine on takeoff from U-Tapao airfield in Thailand and crashes, killing its entire crew of four.
- October 3 – A U.S. Air Force C-7B Caribou carrying troops collides during its initial climb after takeoff from Camp Evans in South Vietnam at an altitude of 1,100 feet (340 meters) with a United States Army CH-47A Chinook helicopter approaching the camp for a landing with troops and mail on board. Both aircraft crash, killing all 13 people on the Caribou and all 11 on the Chinook.
- October 6 – Three hijackers commandeer an Aeromaya Hawker Siddeley HS 748-230 Series 2 (registration XA-SE) during a domestic flight in Mexico from Cozumel to Mérida and force it to fly them to Cuba.
- October 7 – On approach to Paso Canoas Airport in Paso Canoas, Costa Rica, an Aerovias del Valle Britten-Norman BN-2 Islander crashes on a beach at the mouth of the Rio Grande de Terraba 7 km (4.3 mi) west of the airport, killing all 10 people on board.
- October 11 – The CSA Czech Airlines Avia 14-32A Svit Gottwaldov (registration OK-MCJ) crashes near Ptice, Czechoslovakia, just after takeoff from Prague Ruzyně International Airport in Prague, killing 11 of the 40 people on board.
- October 16 – An E-2A Hawkeye crashes into the sea with the loss of three crewmen while attempting a night landing on the deck of the attack aircraft carrier USS Forrestal (CVA-59). Two crewmen are recovered.
- October 20
  - A U.S. Air Force C-47D Skytrain suffers an in-flight engine failure and crashes 32 km (20 mi) south of Buôn Ma Thuột, South Vietnam, killing all 23 people on board.
  - A Serviços Aéreos Cruzeiro do Sul C-47A-25-DK Skytrain (registration PP-SAD) suffers an engine failure after takeoff from Feijó Airport in Feijó, Brazil, and crashes while attempting to return to the airport, killing all 19 people on board.
- October 22 – During a night approach to Ching Chuan Kang Air Base in Taichung, Taiwan, a U.S. Air Force KC-135A-BN Stratotanker flies into the side of a 7,300-foot (2,200-meter) mountain 75 km (47 mi) from the base, killing all six people on board.
- October 23
  - Under extreme financial stress, Alben Truitt, a grandson of the late Vice President of the United States Alben W. Barkley, charters a Cessna 177 at Key West, Florida, claiming that he wishes to make an aerial sightseeing trip to the Dry Tortugas and take aerial photographs of Fort Jefferson. Halfway through the trip, he produces an improvised explosive device and orders the pilot to fly him to Havana, Cuba, where he is arrested upon arrival, despite claiming that he wishes to write a nonfiction book about Cuba.
  - A Beechcraft Queen Air is believed to have crashed in Lake Superior near the Keweenaw Peninsula, Michigan, with three aboard. They were gathering water temperature and other data for the National Center for Atmospheric Research. A lake bed sonar search for the crash site began in September, 2024.
- October 24 – National Aeronautics and Space Administration (NASA) pilot William "Bill" Dana pilots the 199th flight of the North American X-15. Although not planned as such, it will be the last X-15 flight.
- October 25 – Northeast Airlines Flight 946, a Fairchild Hiller FH-227, crashes on Moose Mountain near Etna, New Hampshire, while descending on approach to a refueling stop at Lebanon, New Hampshire. Thirty-two of the 42 people on board die, and all 10 survivors suffer injuries.
- October 30 – A hijacker takes over a SAESA Curtiss C-46 Commando during a domestic flight in Mexico from Tampico to Reynosa. The airliner flies him to Brownsville, Texas.

=== November ===
- November 1
  - President Lyndon B. Johnson's administration suspends all American bombing of North Vietnam; Operation Rolling Thunder is suspended.
  - Ansett-ANA is renamed Ansett Airlines of Australia.
- November 2 – A 17-year-old boy armed with a 16-gauge shotgun who had boarded Eastern Airlines Flight 284, a Douglas DC-9 with 50 people on board, at Mobile, Alabama, enters the cockpit while the airliner is on the ground at Birmingham, Alabama, preparing for departure for Chicago, Illinois, and demands to be flown to South Vietnam. The flight crew overpowers him.
- November 4 – After changing from business attire into the clothing favored by the Black Panther Party in a lavatory shortly after takeoff aboard National Airlines Flight 186 – a Boeing 727 with 65 people on board flying from New Orleans, Louisiana, to Miami, Florida – Raymond Johnson uses a .38-caliber revolver to hijack the airliner. He identifies himself as a "black nationalist freedom fighter" and demands that the plane fly to Havana, Cuba. During the flight, Johnson announces that he has renamed the plane Republic of New Africa, and he robs the passengers of $405, which he says will be a donation for "the revolution," and he forces the flight attendants to count the money on the cabin floor. After the plane lands in Havana, Cuban authorities arrest Johnson and return the stolen money to National Airlines. In 1986, Johnson will return to the United States, saying that he was a fool to have hijacked the airliner.
- November 6 – As Philippine Air Lines Flight 158A, a Fokker F27 with 43 people on board flying from Cebu to Manila in the Philippines, begins its descent to Manila, four armed passengers enter the cockpit and hijack the plane. As they move through the cabin, robbing the passengers, a federal policeman on the plane draws a gun, and one passenger is killed during an ensuing gun battle. The airliner lands at Manila International Airport, where the hijackers force the flight crew to taxi to a remote part of the airport, disembark with the captain and two passengers as hostages, release the hostages at the airport fence, and escape in a waiting getaway car.
- November 7 – A Philippine Air Force C-47 Skytrain crashes into a mountainside in the Zambales Mountains on Luzon in the Philippines, killing all 11 people on board.
- November 8 – Two Italian men claiming to be members of the "International Command for Greece" hijack an Olympic Airlines Boeing 707 during a flight from Paris to Athens with 128 other people on board, threatening the flight crew with a gun and a hand grenade, and force the cabin to crew to hand out pamphlets expressing opposition to the rule of the Greek military junta. Announcing that the passengers are being punished for traveling to Greece, they order the airliner to return to Paris, where they surrender to French police officers at Orly Airport.
- November 18 – Two hijackers commandeer a Mexicana de Aviación Douglas DC-6 with 18 passengers on board during a domestic flight in Mexico from Mérida to Villahermosa and force it to fly to Havana, Cuba.
- November 22 – Attempting to land at San Francisco International Airport in San Mateo County, California, a Douglas DC-8-62 operating as Japan Airlines Flight 2 unintentionally lands in San Francisco Bay 2 1/2 miles (4.0 km) short of the runway. All 107 people on board survive the mishap, and the aircraft itself is recovered 55 hours later.
- November 23
  - Four passengers hijack Eastern Airlines Flight 73, a Boeing 727 with 90 people on board flying from Chicago, Illinois, to Miami, Florida, and force it to fly to Havana, Cuba.
  - A Cable Commuter de Havilland Canada DHC-6 Twin Otter 200 on approach to Santa Ana-Orange County Airport in Orange County, California, strikes a light pole on the Newport Freeway and crashes 2.9 km (1.8 mi) north of the airport, killing all nine people on board.
- November 24 – Four men hijack Pan Am Flight 281, a Boeing 707, during a flight from John F. Kennedy International Airport in New York City to San Juan, Puerto Rico, and force it to fly them to Havana, Cuba. U.S. jet fighter aircraft follow the airliner until it reaches Cuban airspace.
- November 25 – An Air America C-46D-20-CU Commando suffers an engine failure just after takeoff from Savannakhet Airport near Savannakhet, Laos, and crashes 3 km (1.9 mi) from the airport, with one of its wings separating and catching fire and the fuselage coming to rest inverted. The crash kills 26 of the 28 people on board.
- November 30 – A hijacker commandeers Eastern Airlines Flight 532, a Boeing 720 with 45 people on board flying from Miami, Florida, to Dallas, Texas, and forces it to fly to Cuba.

=== December ===
- December 2 – Wien Consolidated Airlines Flight 55, a Fairchild F-27B, suffers structural failure after encountering severe turbulence and crashes into Spotsy Lake at Pedro Bay, Alaska, killing all 39 people on board.
- December 3 – Armed with a .45-caliber pistol and what appears to be a hand grenade, Cuban exile Eduardo Canteras hijacks National Airlines Flight 1439 – a Boeing 727 with 35 people on board flying from New York City to Miami, Florida – as it prepares to land at Miami and orders it to bypass Miami and fly on to Havana, Cuba. When the flight crew tells him that the airliner will run out of fuel and crash into the sea before reaching Cuba, he allows it to land at Key West, Florida, to refuel. Local police offer to shoot out the plane's tires while it is on the ground at Key West, but National Airlines officials refuse to let them, citing concerns that Canteras will detonate his grenade. The plane takes off again and flies on to Havana, where Cuban authorities arrest Canteras. The other passengers and crew are held for 24 hours before being allowed to return to the United States.
- December 11 – Armed with a pistol, 20-year-old James Joseph Patterson hijacks Trans World Airlines Flight 496 – a Boeing 727 flying from Nashville, Tennessee, to Miami, Florida, with 39 people on board, including actor and entertainer Tex Ritter and professional golfer Mason Rudolph – and forces it to fly to Cuba, where he and his 19-year-old wife Gwendolyn disembark.
- December 12 – Pan Am Boeing 707-321B Clipper Malay, operating as Flight 217, crashes into the Caribbean Sea near Caracas, Venezuela, killing all 51 people on board. Among the dead is former Miss Venezuela Olga Antonetti.
- December 16 – The Indonesian airline PT Sempati Air Transport is founded. It will begin flight operations in March 1969, and in 1994 it will change its name to Sempati Air.
- December 17
  - After suffering fuel transfer difficulties leading to engine problems, a United States Air Force C-123B-11-FA Provider crashes south-southwest of Chu Lai Air Base, Chu Lai, South Vietnam, killing 14 of the 44 people on board.
- December 17 – The last surviving XB-70 Valkyrie – the U.S. Air Force's XB-70A Air Vehicle 1 (AV-1) – makes its last supersonic flight.
- December 19 – Accompanied by his three-year-old daughter, who he had abducted from his ex-wife, and claiming to have a gun and nitroglycerine, 27-year-old Thomas George Washington hijacks Eastern Airlines Flight 47, a Douglas DC-8 with 151 people on board flying from Philadelphia, Pennsylvania, to Miami, Florida, and forces it to fly to Havana, Cuba. He says he wishes to leave the United States "because of all the hatred and prejudice." He apologizes to the other passengers before disembarking at Havana.
- December 20 – At Edwards Air Force Base, California, X-15 program personnel attempting a 200th flight of the North American X-15 find the base covered by snow. Deeming the highly unusual snowfall an omen, they decide against the flight and simply retire the aircraft instead. It is the end of the X-15 program.
- December 24
  - Apollo 8 orbits the Moon carrying Frank Borman, James Lovell, and William Anders.
  - Allegheny Airlines Flight 736, a Convair CV-580 (registration N5802), strikes trees while on approach to Bradford Regional Airport outside Bradford, Pennsylvania. It crashes inverted 2.5 miles (4.0 km) southeast of the airport and about 800 feet (240 meters) from its first contact with the trees, killing 20 of the 47 people on board.
- December 26
  - Two members of the Popular Front for the Liberation of Palestine (PFLP) attack El Al Flight 253, a Boeing 707, with a submachine gun and hand grenades as it prepares to depart Athens, Greece, killing one passenger and seriously wounding a flight attendant before being arrested.
  - An Exportada de Sal S.A. (ESSA) Douglas DC-3 crashes into the side of a mountain 40 km (25 mi) east of Ensenada, Mexico, killing all 12 people on board.
- December 27 – North Central Airlines Flight 458, a Convair CV-580, crashes into a hangar at O'Hare International Airport in Chicago, Illinois, while attempting a go around in poor weather at night, killing 27 of the 45 people on board and killing one and injuring six people on the ground.
- December 28 – In retaliation for the 26 December PFLP attack on El Al Flight 253, Israeli Sayeret Matkal special forces conduct a raid against Beirut International Airport in Beirut, Lebanon. They destroy eight passenger aircraft (a Vickers VC10, a Boeing 707-320C, two Sud Aviation Caravelle VINs, three de Havilland Comet 4Cs, and one Vickers Viscount) belonging to Middle East Airlines, four passenger aircraft (two Convair CV-990 Coronados and two Douglas DC-7s) belonging to Lebanese International Airways, and two cargo planes (a Douglas DC-4 and a Douglas DC-6) belonging to Trans Mediterranean Airways. There are no deaths or injuries during the raid. The lost aircraft have an insurance value estimated at US$43.8 million.
- December 31 – MacRobertson Miller Airlines Flight 1750, a Vickers Viscount Type 720, loses more than half of its right wing near the end of a flight from Perth to Port Hedland, Australia, and crashes 28 nautical miles (32 miles; 51 km) south of Port Hedland, killing all 26 people on board.

== First flights ==
- Bell 212

=== March ===
- March 20 – LFU 205

=== April ===
- April 22 – Cessna 187

=== May ===
- May 13 – Piper PA-35 Pocono
- May 25 – Grumman EA-6B Prowler

=== June ===
- June 30 – Lockheed C-5 Galaxy

=== July ===
- Nord N 500 (tethered)

=== August ===
- August 2 – Aérospatiale SA 341 Gazelle

=== September ===
- September 8 – SEPECAT Jaguar
- September 11 – Dassault Hirondelle

=== October ===
- October 4 – Tupolev Tu-154
- October 23 – Indraéro Aéro 30
- October 26 – Embraer EMB 110 Bandeirante

=== November ===
- November 1 – Cessna 414
- November 4 – Aero L-39 Albatros
- November 7 – Conroy Stolifter
- November 13 – Northrop HL-10

=== December ===
- December 3 – Anahuac Tauro XB-TAX
- December 31 – Tupolev Tu-144

== Entered service ==
=== January ===
- January 22 – Schweizer QT-2 with the United States Army

=== February ===
- Boeing 737 with Lufthansa

=== March ===
- March 6 – Bell CH-118 (ex-CUH-1H) with Canadian Armed Forces Mobile Command

=== April ===
- April 12 – Beagle Pup with Shoreham Flying School

=== May ===
- May 2 – Beechcraft Model 99 with Commuter Airlines

== Retirements ==
- Beriev Be-10 (NATO reporting name "Mallow") by the 2nd Squadron of Soviet Naval Aviation′s 977th Independent Naval Long-range Reconnaissance Air Regiment

=== December ===
- December 20 – North American X-15

== Deadliest crash ==
The deadliest crash of this year was a military shootdown, namely the 1968 Kham Duc C-130 shootdown, when a United States Air Force Lockheed C-130B Hercules was shot down in southern Vietnam on 12 May, during the Vietnam War, killing all 155 people on board; it was at the time the deadliest plane crash of all time.
