= V23 =

V23, or similar, may refer to:

- DR Class V 23, a locomotive
- ITU-T V.23, a modem standard
- Fokker V.23, a German experimental fighter aircraft of the 1910s
- Skytrader UV-23 Scout, an American prototype utility aircraft of the 1970s
- iCar V23, a battery electric compact SUV
- v23, a British graphic design studio founded by Vaughan Oliver
- V23, supervision of high-risk pregnancy, in the ICD-9 V codes
