= PA35 =

PA35 may refer to:

- Pennsylvania Route 35
- Pennsylvania's 35th congressional district
- Piper PA-35 Pocono
