= Potez 840 =

1960s executive transport aircraft

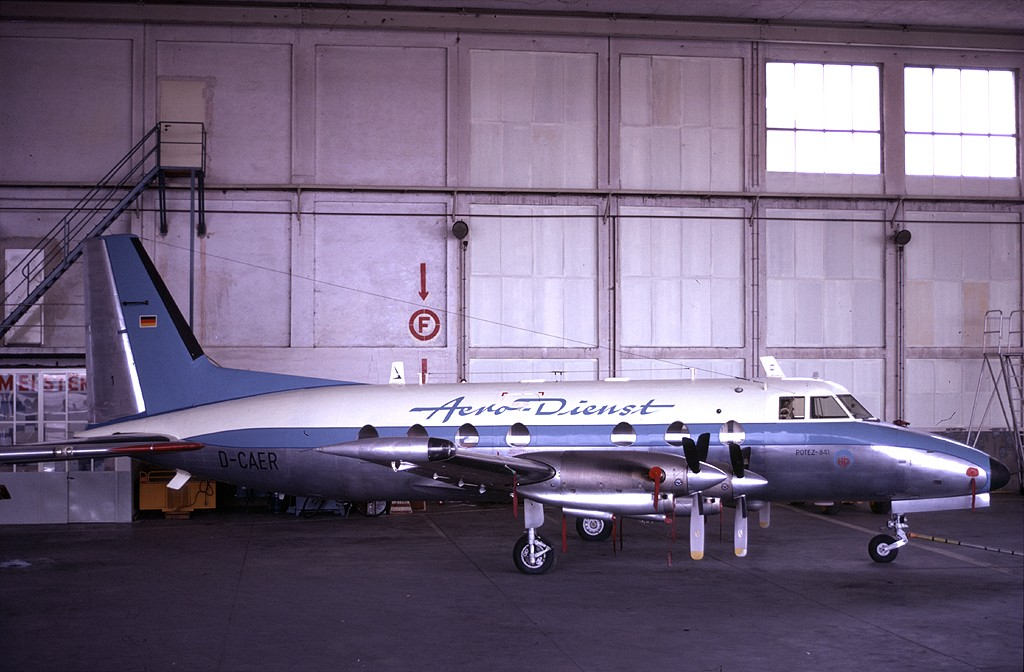
- Aero-Dienst Potez 841 at Munich Riem Airport (1968)

General information
- Type: 18-Passenger executive transport monoplane
- Manufacturer: Potez
- Number built: 8

History
- Manufactured: 1961–1967
- First flight: 29 April 1961

The Potez 840 was a 1960s French four-engined 18-passenger executive monoplane, the last aircraft to use the Potez name.

== Development ==
The Potez 840 was an all-metal cantilever-wing monoplane with a retractable tricycle landing gear. It had a crew of three and a cabin for 18 passengers. It was powered by four 440 shp (328 kW) Turbomeca Astazou II turboprop engines. The prototype first flew on 29 April 1961; a second aircraft flew in June 1962 and had more powerful 600 shp (447 kW) Turbomeca Astazou XII engines. The second prototype carried out a sales tour of North America and it was planned to build a batch of 25 aircraft for Chicago-based Turbo Flight Inc. but only two more prototype aircraft were built, one for static testing. The next two aircraft were designated the Potez 841 and were powered by 550 shp (417 kW) Pratt & Whitney Canada PT6A-6 turboprop engines. Another two modified Astazou-powered aircraft were produced, one in 1965 and one in 1967.

It was intended to build Potez 840s in a factory at Baldonnel Aerodrome in the Republic of Ireland with financial aid from the Government of Ireland but this factory was closed in 1968 without completing a single aircraft. The former Potez factory at Baldonnel became an engine maintenance facility for the German airline Lufthansa with the factory finally closing in 2013.

== Service ==
The two Potez 841s were delivered to German customers in 1965, remaining in use until the mid 1970s. The first Potez 842 was operated by the French national civil pilot training school, Service de la Formation Aéronautique (SFA) from 1966 to 1976, while the second 842 was purchased by the Moroccan Ministry of Defense, being sold on in 1978.

== Variants ==
Potez 840
Astazou-powered variant, four built.
Potez 841
Production variant powered by 558 shp (416 kW) Pratt & Whitney PT6A-6 engines, two built.
Potez 842
Production variant powered by 640 shp (480 kW) Turbomeca Astazou XII engines, two built.
Potez 843
Unbuilt 1965 proposal with deeper fuselage and PT6 engines.
Potez 880
Unbuilt military STOL version with four 917 shp (684 kW) Turbomeca Bastan engines.
Potez 881
Unbuilt civil version of 880.

== Surviving aircraft ==
- One aircraft is displayed at the Musée de l’air et de l’espace in Paris.
- The intact fuselage of a second is in the Shetland Islands. It suffered a wheels-up landing at Sumburgh Airport in 1981. Many years later the fuselage was recovered and moved to its current location at North Roe in 2007.

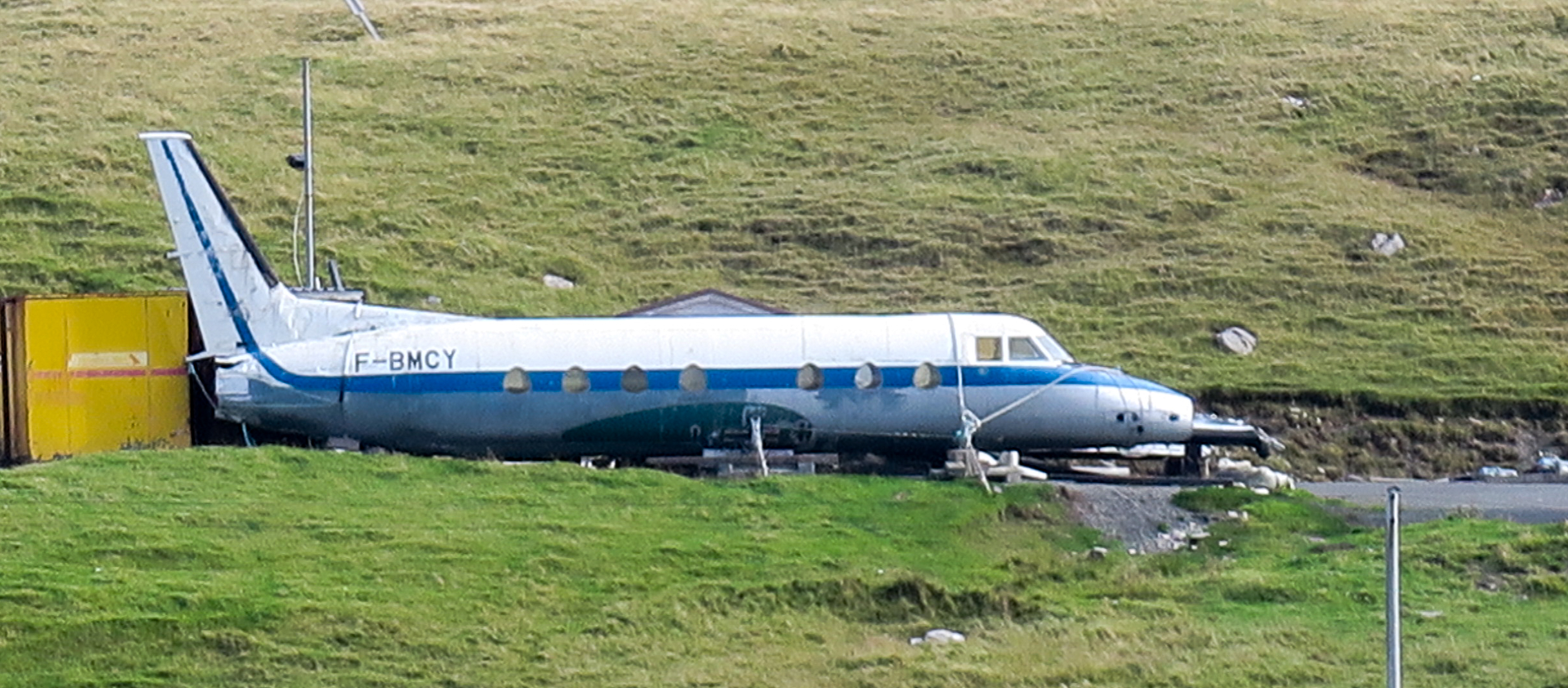
Potez 840 fuselage near North Roe, Shetland.

== Specifications (Potez 842) ==
Data from Jane's All The World's Aircraft 1965–66.

General characteristics

- Crew: 2
- Capacity: 24 passengers
- Length: 15.89 m (52 ft 2 in)
- Wingspan: 19.60 m (64 ft 4 in)
- Height: 5.19 m (17 ft 0 in)
- Wing area: 35.0 m^{2} (377 sq ft)
- Aspect ratio: 10.75:1
- Airfoil: NACA 63 (modified)
- Empty weight: 5,430 kg (11,971 lb)
- Max takeoff weight: 8,900 kg (19,621 lb)
- Fuel capacity: 2,000 L (530 US gal; 440 imp gal)
- Powerplant: 4 × Turbomeca Astazou X turboprops, 480 kW (640 shp) each
- Propellers: 3-bladed, 2.07 m (6 ft 9 in) diameter

Performance

- Maximum speed: 500 km/h (310 mph, 270 kn) at sea level
- Cruise speed: 400 km/h (250 mph, 220 kn) at 6,000 m (20,000 ft) (econ cruise)
- Stall speed: 135 km/h (84 mph, 73 kn)
- Never exceed speed: 610 km/h (380 mph, 330 kn)
- Range: 3,000 km (1,900 mi, 1,600 nmi)
- Service ceiling: 8,000 m (26,000 ft)
- Rate of climb: 10.49 m/s (2,065 ft/min)

== See also ==
Aircraft of comparable role, configuration, and era

- Cessna 620
- de Havilland Heron
- Piper PA-35 Pocono

== Bibliography ==
- Chillon, Jacques; Dubois, Jean-Pierre & Wegg, John (1980). French Post-War Transport Aircraft. Tonbridge, UK: Air-Britain (Historians). ISBN 0-85130-078-2.
- Dawydoff, Alex (August 1961). "From France: Potez 840 Light Transport". Flying. Vol. 69, no. 2. pp. 25, 88–89.
- "Potez 840 for RAF?". Air-Britain Aeromilitaria. Vol. 43. March 2017. p. 13. ISSN 0262-8791.
- Simpson, Rod (2014). "Elegant Imperfection". The Aviation Historian. No. 35. pp. 101–107. ISSN 2051-1930.
- Taylor, John W. R. (1965). Jane's All The World's Aircraft 1965–66. London: Sampson Low, Marston.
- Taylor, Michael J. H. (1989). Jane's Encyclopedia of Aviation. London: Studio Editions.
- The Illustrated Encyclopedia of Aircraft (Part Work 1982–1985). Orbis Publishing. pp. 2776–7.
