= Turbomeca Astazou =

1957 turboshaft engine family by Turbomeca

Astazou
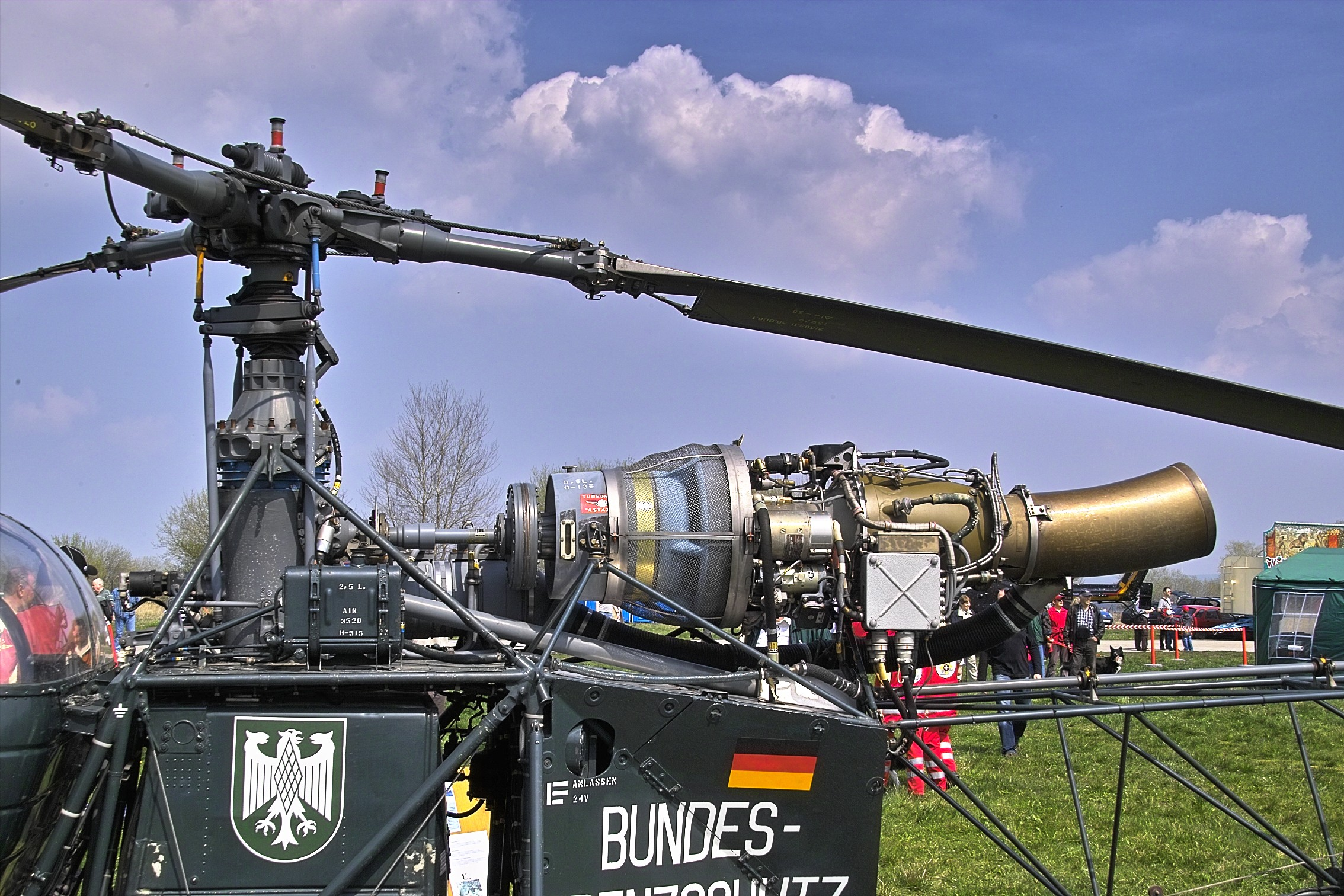
- Turbomeca Astazou IIA on an SA 318C Alouette II
- Type: Turboshaft/Turboprop
- National origin: France
- Manufacturer: Turbomeca
- First run: 1957
- Major applications: Aérospatiale Gazelle; Handley Page Jetstream; FMA IA 58 Pucará

The Turbomeca Astazou is a highly successful series of turboprop and turboshaft engines, first run in 1957. The original version weighed 110 kg (243 lb) and developed 240 kW (320 shp) at 40,000 rpm. It was admitted for aviation service on May 29, 1961, after a 150-hour test run. The main developing engineer was G. Sporer. It was named after two summits of the Pyrenees.

A simplified version was built by Agusta as the Turbomeca-Agusta TA.230.

== Design and development ==
The Astazou IIA version was derived from the original Astazou powerplant for use in helicopters. By 1993, 2,200 had been built. As of 2007, it was still in production. However, many aircraft initially equipped with it, especially the heavier ones, have since been upgraded with more powerful engines.

The early single-shaft Astazou has a two-stage compressor, with the first stage an axial and the second stage a radial design. It has an annular combustion chamber, after which the combustion gases enter a three-stage axial turbine.

Engines have a reduction gearbox in front of the air inlet, with an output speed suitable for a propeller or, for helicopters, as the first stage only of the much bigger reduction required for a rotor. Fuel to the gas generator is adjusted automatically to maintain a constant propeller or rotor speed as blade pitch varies.

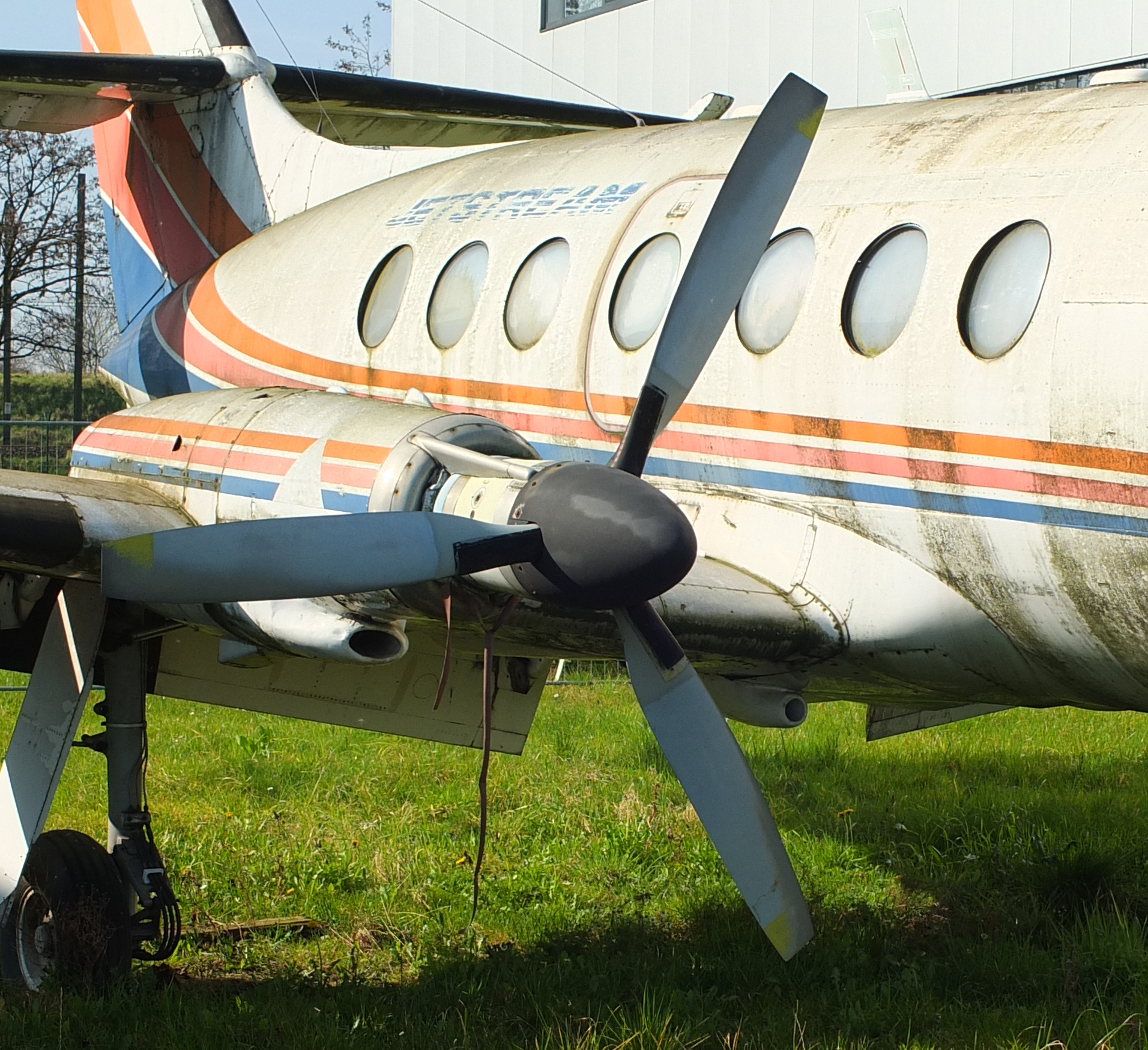
Handley Page HP.137 Jetstream, with twin Astazou XIV, showing the distinctive annular air inlet and long reduction gear housing

As of the Astazou X, the engine received a second axial compressor stage. This was the engine for the Potez 840. The Astazou XIV and XVI were also marketed by Rolls-Royce Turboméca International Ltd under the names AZ14 and AZ16, respectively.

Power was steadily increased over the years, with the Eurocopter Dauphin's dual Astazou XVIII developing 783 kW each. The Astazou XX received a third axial stage, raising compression to achieve a projected output of 1,075 kW (1,442 hp) in the turboprop application. The XXB derivative, used in the single engine Aérospatiale SA 361H Dauphin, delivered 1,043 kW (1,399 shp).

== Variants ==
Astazou I
Astazou II
Single-stage axial plus single-stage centrifugal compressor, annular combustor, three-stage turbine
Astazou IIA
Astazou III
Astazou IIIA
Astazou IIIC
Astazou IIIC2
Astazou IIIN
Astazou IIIN2
Astazou VI
Coupled Astazou 1,100 kW (1,480 shp)
Astazou X
The X and subsequent engines had a second axial compressor stage added.
Astazou XII
Astazou XIV
Two-stage axial plus single-stage centrifugal compressor, annular combustor, three-stage turbine. Integral front mounted

gearbox.

Astazou XIVA
Astazou XIVB
Astazou XIVD
Astazou XIVC
Astazou XIVH
Astazou XIVM
Astazou XVI
Astazou XVIG
Astazou XVIII
Astazou XVIIIA
Astazou XX
A third axial compressor stage added for increased pressure ratio.
Astazou XXB
Turbomeca-Agusta TA.230
(aka TAA-230)A simplified version built by Agusta.
Rolls-Royce Turbomeca AZ14
The Astazou XIV marketed by Rolls-Royce Turbomeca International Ltd as the AZ14
Rolls-Royce Turbomeca AZ16
The Astazou XVI marketed by Rolls-Royce Turbomeca International Ltd as the AZ16

== Applications ==
=== Fixed-wing aircraft ===
- Dassault Communauté
- Dassault MD320 Hirondelle 2x Astazou XIV 640 kW (860 hp) equivalent.
- Dornier Do27T-l 2x Astazou II 419 kW (562 hp) equivalent.
- FMA IA 58 Pucará 2x Astazou XVIG 713 kW (956 hp) equivalent.
- Handley Page HP.137 Jetstream 2x Astazou XIVC 687 kW (921 hp) equivalent.
- Mitsubishi MU-2
- Nord Noralpha
- Pilatus PC-6/A1-H2 Turbo Porter lx Astazou XII 545 kW (731 hp) equivalent.
- Potez 840 4x 328 kW (440 hp) Turboméca Astazou II
- Potez 842 4x 447 kW (599 hp)) Turboméca Astazou XII
- SFERMA Nord 1110
- SFERMA SF-60 Marquis 2x Astazou X
- SFERMA PD-146 Marquis 2x Astazou IIA
- Short SC.7 Skyvan series II 2x Astazou XII 545 kW (731 hp) equivalent.
- SIPA S-2510 Antilope
- IAI Arava 2x Astazou XIV 630 kW (850 hp) equivalent.
- UV-23A Dominion Skytrader 2x Turboméca Astazou XIV

=== Helicopters ===
- Aérospatiale SA.3180 Alouette II Astazou 1x Astazou IIA 390 kW (523 hp) (but restricted to 300 kW (400 hp) by rotor transmission).
- Aérospatiale SA.319B Alouette III 1x Astazou XIVB 440 kW (590 hp).
- Aérospatiale Gazelle 1x Astazou IIIN 441 kW (592 hp) equivalent.
- Aérospatiale Gazelle AH.1 1x Astazou IIIN2
- Agusta A.105
- Agusta A.106
- Agusta A.115
- Aérospatiale SA 360 Dauphin
- Dechaux Helicop-Jet 1x Astazou II

== Specifications (Astazou XVI) ==
Data from Aircraft engines of the World 1970

==== General characteristics ====
- Type: Turboprop
- Length: 2,000 mm (79 in) including propeller
- Diameter: 546 mm (21.5 in)
- Frontal area: 0.23 m^{2} (2.5 sq ft)
- Dry weight: 206 kg (454 lb)

==== Components ====
- Compressor: 2-stage axial + 1-stage centrifugal
- Combustors: Annular combustion chamber
- Turbine: 3-stage axial turbine
- Fuel type: Aviation Kerosene such as Jet A-1, JP-4 and JP-5
- Oil system: Pressure spray at 300 kPa (44 psi) with scavenge

==== Performance ====
- Maximum power output:
- Take-off power: 811 kW (1,088 shp) (equivalent) (766 kW (1,027 shp) + 0.67 kN (150 lbf)) at 43,000 rpm (static)
- Max. Continuous power: 743 kW (996 shp) (equivalent) (699 kW (937 shp) + 0.64 kN (145 lbf)) at 43,000 rpm (static)
- Overall pressure ratio: 8.15:1
- Air mass flow: 3.35 kg/s (443 lb/min) at 43,000 rpm
- Specific fuel consumption: 0.30 kg/kWh (0.5 lb/(hp⋅h)) (equivalent)
- Power-to-weight ratio: 3.9 kW/kg (2.4 hp/lb) (equivalent)

| Parameter | II | IIA | IIIC2/N2 | X | XIVB/F | XIVH | XIVM | XVI |
|---|---|---|---|---|---|---|---|---|
| Max output | 390 kW (523 shp) | 390 kW (523 shp) | 480 kW (644 shp) | 465 kW (624 shp) | 440 kW (590 shp) | 440 kW (590 shp) | 440 kW (590 shp) | 811 kW (1,088 shp) |
| Length | 1,810 mm (71.3 in) | 1,427.5 mm (56.2 in) | 1,433.5 mm (56.4 in) | 1,912 mm (75.3 in) | 1,434 mm (56.5 in) | 1,470 mm (57.9 in) | 1,474 mm (58.0 in) | 2,000 mm (79 in) |
| Diameter | 460 mm (18.1 in) | 460 mm (18.1 in) | 460 mm (18.1 in) | 460 mm (18.1 in) | 460 mm (18.1 in) | 460 mm (18.1 in) | 460 mm (18.1 in) | 546 mm (21.5 in) |
| Width | | 516 mm (20.3 in) | 483 mm (19.0 in) | | 520 mm (20.5 in) | 500 mm (19.7 in) | 460 mm (18.1 in) | |
| Height | | 560 mm (22.0 in) | 508 mm (20.0 in) | | 623.5 mm (24.5 in) | 565 mm (22.2 in) | 570 mm (22.4 in) | |
| Weight | 123 kg (271.2 lb) | 142 kg (313.1 lb) | 150.3 kg (331.4 lb) | 128 kg (282.2 lb) | 160 kg (352.7 lb) | 160 kg (352.7 lb) | 160 kg (352.7 lb) | 206 kg (454 lb) |
| Air mass flow | 2.5 kg/s (330.7 lb/min) | | | | | | | 3.35 kg/s (443.1 lb/min) |
| Pressure ratio | 6:1 | | | 7.5:1 | 8:1 | 8:1 | 8:1 | 8.15:1 |

== See also ==
Related development

- Turbomeca Aspin
- Turbomeca Astafan

Related lists

- List of aircraft engines
