= Nord Aviation N 500 Cadet =

Single-seat VTOL research aircraft

N 500 Cadet
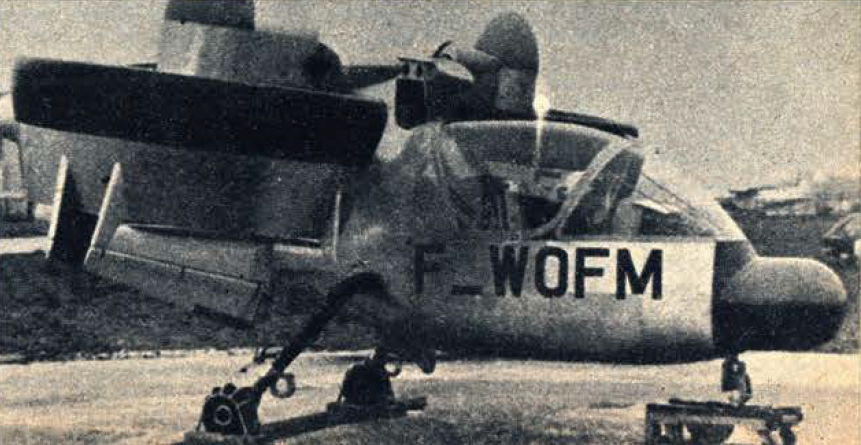

General information
- Type: VTOL research aircraft
- National origin: France
- Manufacturer: Nord Aviation; Aérospatiale
- Number built: 2

History
- First flight: July 1968

The Nord Aviation N 500 Cadet was a single-seat VTOL research aircraft built by Nord Aviation in 1967.

== Design and development ==
A model kit presenting the concept was first shown at the Paris Air Show at Le Bourget in 1965. The aircraft was driven by two ducted fans, with three blades per fan, mounted on short wings that were able to pivot between providing vertical and horizontal thrust.

Two prototypes were constructed, one making its first (tethered) flight in July 1968.

== Specifications (N500) ==
General characteristics

- Crew: 1
- Length: 6.58 m (21 ft 7 in)
- Wingspan: 6.14 m (20 ft 2 in)
- Max takeoff weight: 1,250 kg (2,756 lb)
- Powerplant: 1 × Allison T63 turboshaft, 236 kW (316 hp)

Performance

- Maximum speed: 350 km/h (220 mph, 190 kn)

== See also ==
Related lists

- List of VTOL aircraft
