= Agusta A.105 =

A.105B
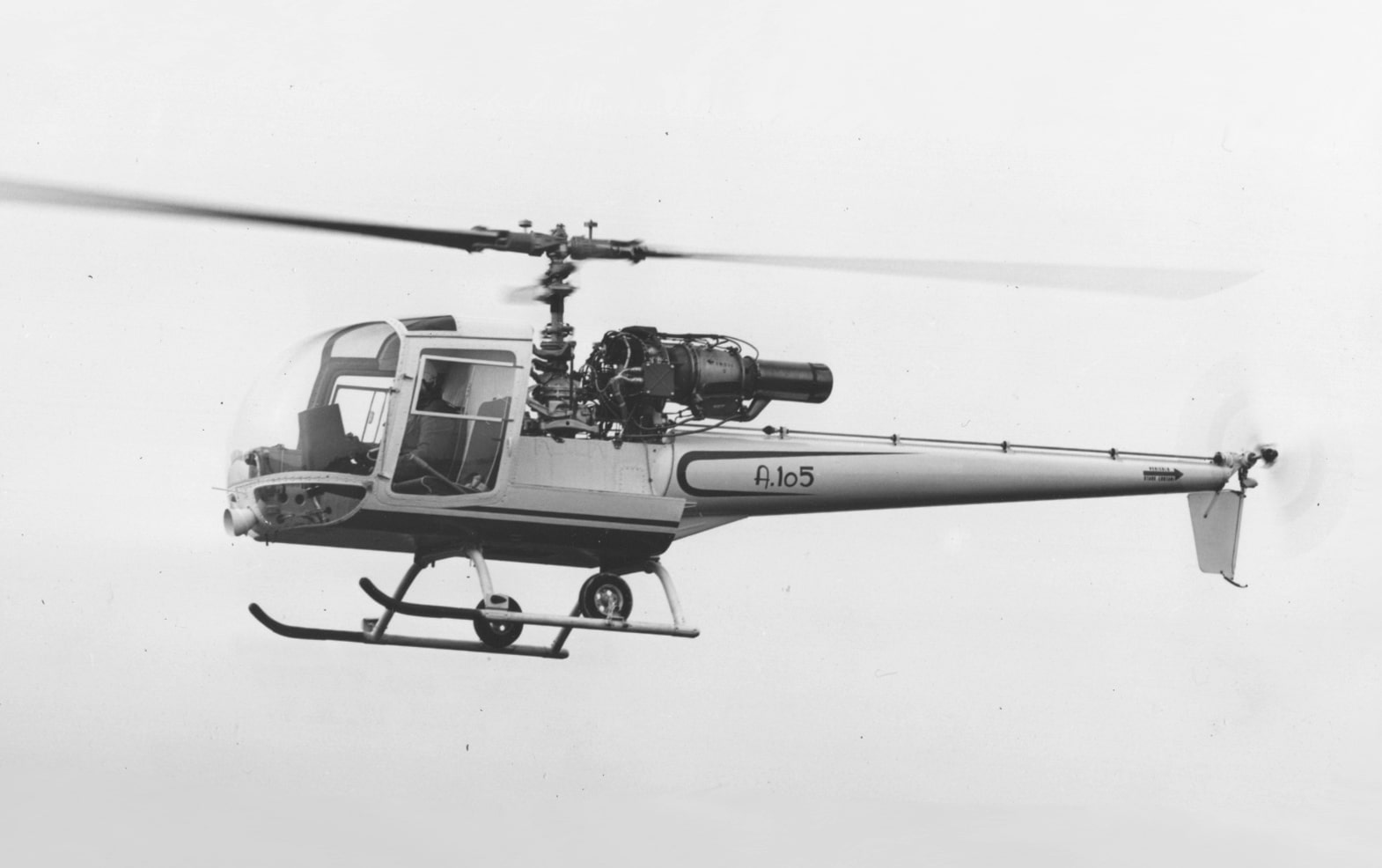
- Agusta A.105 prototype in flight

General information
- Type: Prototype light helicopter
- National origin: Italy
- Manufacturer: Agusta
- Number built: 2

History
- First flight: October 1964

The Agusta A.105 was an Italian rotorcraft designed by Agusta. It was never developed beyond the prototype stage.

== Development and design ==
The A.105 was designed to simplify the manufacturing process. Built to be a liaison, aerial photography and high-speed transport helicopter, it was powered by the Agusta built Turbomeca-Agusta TA-230 turbine engine.

The A.105 and A.105B were displayed at the 1965 Paris Air Show, the latter wearing Italian Air Force markings. Both variants did not progress beyond the prototype stage.

== Variants ==
A.105
Original two-seat prototype
A.105B
Four seater variant.

== Operators ==
Italy

- Italian Air Force

== Specifications (A.105) ==
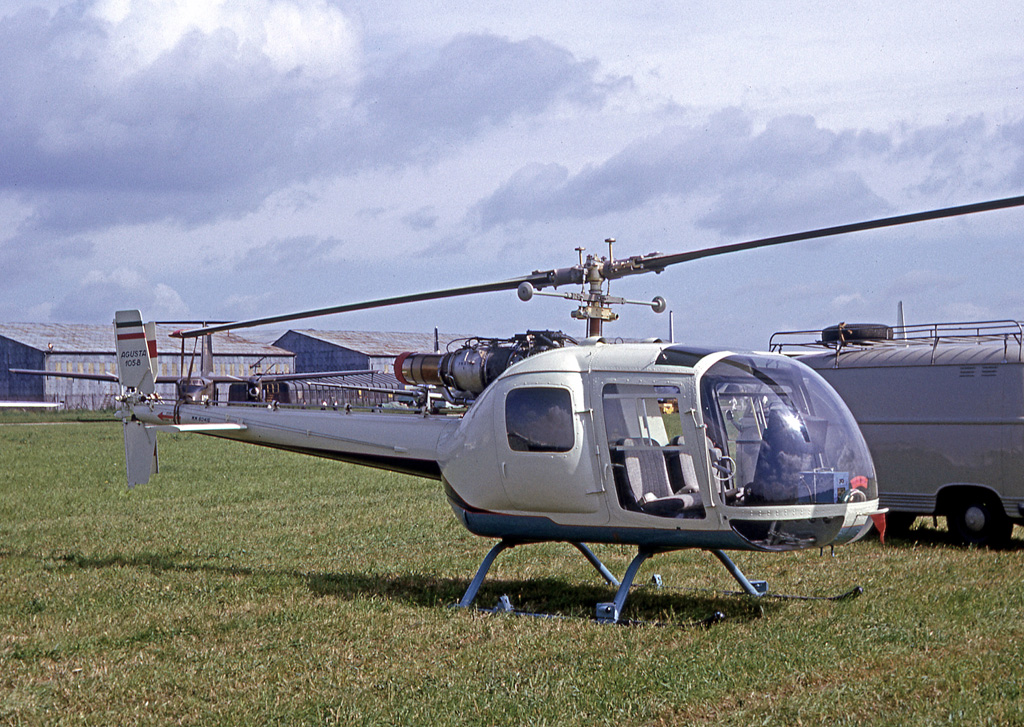
Agusta A.105B prototype exhibited at the 1965 Paris Air Show

Data from Jane's All The World's Aircraft 1965-66

General characteristics

- Crew: 2
- Length: 6.72 m (22 ft 1 in) (fuselage length)
- Height: 2.42 m (7 ft 11 in)
- Empty weight: 550 kg (1,213 lb)
- Gross weight: 1,150 kg (2,535 lb)
- Max takeoff weight: 1,700 kg (3,748 lb)
- Powerplant: 1 × Turbomeca-Agusta TA.230 turboshaft, 205 kW (275 shp)
- Main rotor diameter: 8.40 m (27 ft 7 in)
- Main rotor area: 55.4 m^{2} (596 sq ft)

Performance

- Maximum speed: 185 km/h (115 mph, 100 kn)
- Cruise speed: 175 km/h (109 mph, 94 kn)
- Range: 310 km (190 mi, 170 nmi)
- Endurance: 1 hr 45 min
- Service ceiling: 2,800 m (9,200 ft)

== See also ==
Related lists

- List of rotorcraft
