= SIPA Antilope =

Antilope
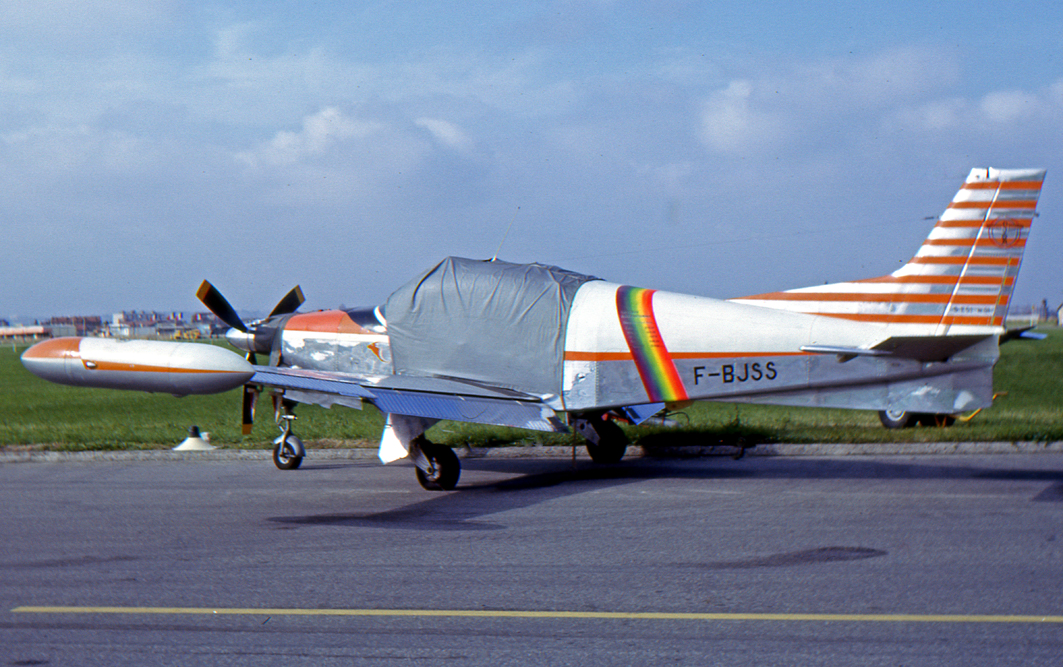
- The sole SIPA Antilope exhibited at the Paris Air Show at Le Bourget in 1965

General information
- Type: 4/5 seat turboprop light aircraft
- National origin: France
- Manufacturer: SIPA
- Status: stored in a private museum
- Number built: 1

History
- First flight: 7 November 1962

The SIPA S.251 Antilope was a low-wing monoplane, seating four or five and powered by a single turboprop engine, developed in France in the early 1960s. It set a number of class records but was not put into production.

== Design and development ==
The Antilope was one of the first turboprop powered light aircraft. Apart from its engine, it was a conventional all-metal low-wing machine. The cantilever wing was built around two spars and was a semi-monocoque structure, carrying unslotted ailerons and electrically powered, single slot Fowler flaps. The fuselage was also of semi-monocoque construction. The tail unit included a variable incidence tailplane and a rudder with a trim tab.

It had an electrically actuated tricycle undercarriage, the main wheels retracting inwards into the wings. The cabin had seats for four or five, two at the front and a bench seat behind. In a proposed air ambulance configuration, the Antilope would have carried two stretchers and a medic. Access to the cabin was via a large rear hinged door on the starboard side.

The Antilope was powered by a 665 hp (495 kW) Turbomeca Astazou X driving a 3-bladed propeller, on a long spinner, well ahead of the surrounding air intake.

It first flew on 7 November 1962 and gained certification in April 1964. That autumn, P. Bonneau set six international Class C1c (1000 – 1750 kg) records with it, achieving for example a speed of 432.9 km/h (267 mph) over a 3 km course and reaching an altitude of 10,420 m (34,186 ft). Early in 1965 it flew with a four-bladed propeller and improved on one of its own records. A three-blade propeller was re-installed and the aircraft was exhibited at the 1965 Paris Air Show wearing registration F-BJSS. By mid 1966 development had been completed without a decision to commence production. The production version would have been known as the SIPA S.2510 Antilope but none were built; the prototype (F-WJSS) carried the designation S.251 on its fin.

The sole Antilope is undergoing restoration in a private museum, owned by the Association Antilope, at Montpelier-Mediterranee Airport, in southern France.

== Specifications (S.2510) ==
Data from Jane's All the World's Aircraft 1966-67 (projected production variant S.2510, estimated at maximum takeoff weight).

General characteristics

- Crew: 1
- Capacity: 4/5
- Length: 9.015 m (29 ft 7 in)
- Wingspan: 11.11 m (36 ft 5 in)
- Height: 2.60 m (8 ft 6 in)
- Wing area: 16.21 m^{2} (174.5 sq ft)
- Airfoil: root: NACA 23015; tip: NACA 4411
- Empty weight: 990 kg (2,183 lb)
- Max takeoff weight: 1,900 kg (4,189 lb)
- Powerplant: 1 × Turbomeca Astazou X turboprop, 496 kW (665 shp)
- Propellers: 3-bladed Ratier-Figeac FH 76, 1.92 m (6 ft 4 in) diameter constant-speed propeller

Performance

- Maximum speed: 450 km/h (280 mph, 240 kn) at 6,100 m (20,000 ft)
- Cruise speed: 380 km/h (240 mph, 210 kn) 70% power, at 6,100 m (20,000 ft)
- Range: 2,000 km (1,200 mi, 1,100 nmi) typical max
- Service ceiling: 1,100 m (3,600 ft)
- Rate of climb: 13.5 m/s (2,660 ft/min) at sea level
