= 1968 Kham Duc C-130 shootdown =

US Air Force aviation disaster

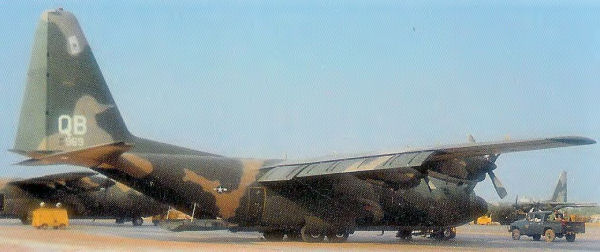
- An Lockheed C-130B Hercules, similar to the aircraft involved in the shootdown

Shootdown
- Date: May 12, 1968
- Summary: Aircraft shot down by North Vietnamese Army
- Site: Kham Duc Airstrip, Kham Duc, South Vietnam; 15.4382°N 107.7969°E

Aircraft
- Aircraft type: Lockheed C-130B Hercules
- Operator: United States Air Force
- Registration: 60-0297
- Flight origin: Kham Duc Airstrip, Kham Duc, South Vietnam
- Destination: Unknown
- Occupants: 155
- Passengers: 150
- Crew: 5
- Fatalities: 155
- Survivors: 0

A United States Air Force Lockheed C-130B Hercules aircraft was shot down on May 12, 1968, during the Battle of Kham Duc in Vietnam. Everyone on board, 150 Vietnamese civilians, one U.S. Special Forces officer, and 5 U.S. Air Force crewmen, were killed. At the time, it was the deadliest aircraft crash in history, is currently the deadliest aviation incident on Vietnamese soil, and remained the deadliest loss of a U.S. military aircraft until Arrow Air Flight 1285R in 1985.

The aircraft, a C-130B serial# 60-0297, assigned to the 834th Air Division Det. 1, 774th Tactical Airlift Squadron, Tan Son Nhut Air Base, commanded by Major Bernard L. Bucher, crew included copilot 1st Lt. Stephen C. Moreland; navigator Maj. James L. McElroy; flight engineer SSgt Frank M. Helper and loadmaster A1C George W. Long. The crew was participating in the evacuation of South Vietnamese civilians from the Kham Duc base that was under attack. The C-130 approached the Kham Duc airstrip from the south and managed to land despite taking hits from opposing North Vietnamese forces. As soon as it landed, 150 South Vietnamese (mainly ARVN family members) rushed onto the aircraft. Once the aircraft was full, Major Bucher took off in a northward direction, unaware that the North Vietnamese were concentrated in that area. According to eyewitness reports, the aircraft, under intense anti-aircraft fire from 12.7mm and 14.5mm heavy machine guns, shook violently out of control, crashed into a nearby ravine less than a mile (1.6 km) from the end of the airstrip, and burned, killing all of the evacuees, the Special Forces officer, and the aircraft's crew of five. Major Bucher was posthumously awarded the Air Force Cross.
