= Pan African Airlines =

Nigerian airline

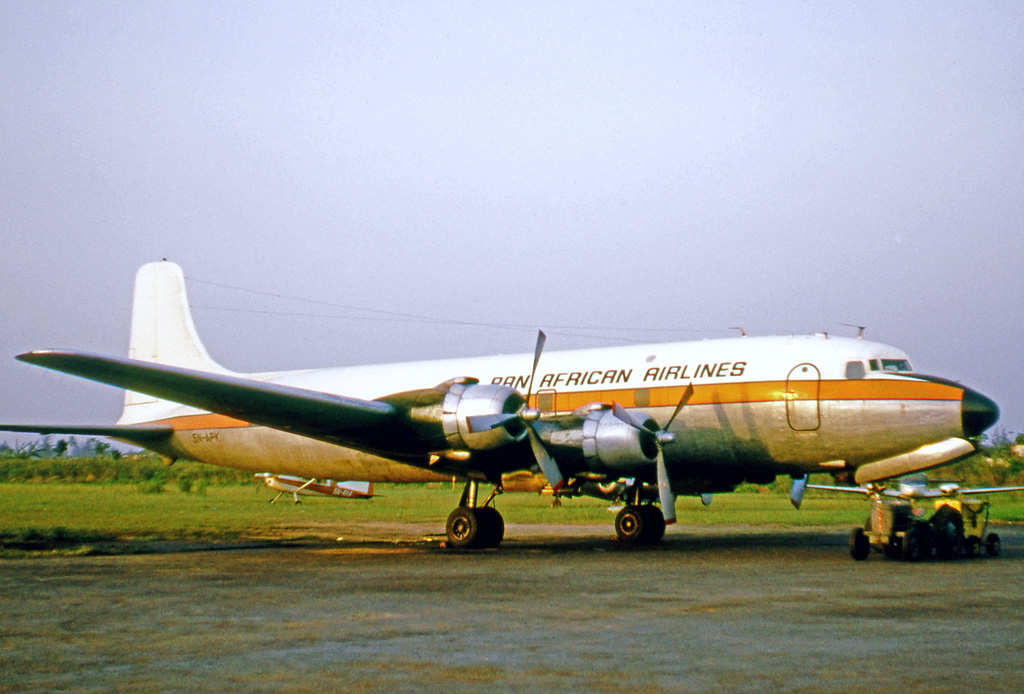
- Former DC 6
IATA	ICAO	Call sign
PF	-	-
- Founded: 1961
- Parent company: Bristow Group
- Headquarters: Nigeria

Pan African Airlines is an airline based in Nigeria and owned by the Bristow Group. They mainly provide helicopter and fixed-wing services to the oil industry. The airline also provides charter services.

== History ==
Pan African Airlines was founded in Nigeria in 1961. The Nigerian government set a deadline of April 30, 2007 for all airlines operating in the country to re-capitalise or be grounded, in an effort to ensure better services and safety. The airline satisfied the Nigerian Civil Aviation Authority (NCAA)’s criteria in terms of re-capitalization and was re-registered for operation. In 2011 Bristow Group began selling its stake in Pan African Airlines.

== Fleet ==
=== Helicopters ===
- Bell 412
- Bell 407
- Bell 206
- Airbus H160
- Leonardo AW189

=== Fixed Wing ===
- Cessna Caravan
- Citation XLS
- ERJ 135

== Accidents and incidents ==
- According to the Aviation Safety Database, Pan African Airlines has had one fatal crash, on September 28, 1968, when all 57 people on board a Douglas C-54B airliner were killed when the 24-year old propeller driven airliner struck the tops of two 50-foot high trees while making its approach to Port Harcourt on a nighttime flight from Lagos. In addition to the passengers, the plane was also carrying a cargo of munitions that exploded upon impact and caused a massive fire that killed the plane's occupants and one person in a village near the airport.
