= Dassault Hirondelle =

French 1960s utility transport aircraft

M.D.320 Hirondelle

General information
- Type: Utility transport
- Manufacturer: Dassault Aviation
- Number built: 1

History
- First flight: 11 September 1968

The Dassault M.D.320 Hirondelle was a French 14-seat utility transport aircraft of the 1960s, designed and built by Dassault Aviation.

== Design and development ==
In 1967 the French Air Force, investigating replacement aircraft for the Douglas DC-3 and Beechcraft 18 twin-engine aircraft being used for light transport and pilot navigation training, solicited proposals from the French industrial community, specifying that any submittals would be powered by 650 kW (870 hp) Turbomeca Astazou turboprops.

In response to this request, Dassault designed and constructed a single prototype M.D.320, later named Hirondelle (Swallow). Design and construction were fairly rapid, due to extensive use of Dassault Falcon 20 elements such as the fuselage. The fuselage length and volume were identical to the Falcon 20, and its wing and control surfaces were adaptations of the 20.

The Hirondelle was an all-metal low-wing monoplane with swept vertical tail and slightly swept wing and tailplane, supported on a retractable tricycle undercarriage, with the main gear retracting into the engine nacelles.

The Hirondelle had a circular cross-section fuselage with accommodation for a crew of two and room for a maximum of 14 passengers with 5 round windows on each side of the pressurized cabin.

The prototype, (French civil registration F-WPXB), was powered by two Turbomeca Astazou XIVD turboprop engines mounted in wing nacelles, driving three-blade fully feathering propellers. Production aircraft would have been powered by Turbomeca Astazou XVI engines.

The airframe was designed using fail-safe principles and the wings contained integral fuel cells.

== Operational history ==
The prototype first flew on 11 September 1968, at Bordeaux-Mérignac.

In 1968, the French Air Force procurement office reversed its previous position and announced that it was seeking jet-powered aircraft for the DC-3/Beechcraft 18 replacement program. Thus, there was no further official interest in the Hirondelle, and no further examples were constructed.

The experience gained in the Hirondelle program was applied to the subsequent Dassault Falcon 10 project, the prototype of which first flew in 1970.

The Hirondelle was the last propeller-powered aircraft to be designed by Dassault.

== Specifications (M.D.320 Hirondelle) ==
Data from The Illustrated Encyclopedia of Aircraft (Part Work 1982-1985)

General characteristics

- Crew: 2
- Capacity: 6 to 14 passengers depending on seating configuration or 1,200 kg (2,600 lb) payload
- Length: 12.72 m (41 ft 9 in)
- Wingspan: 14.55 m (47 ft 9 in)
- Wing area: 27 m^{2} (290 sq ft)
- Empty weight: 2,900 kg (6,393 lb)
- Max takeoff weight: 5,400 kg (11,905 lb)
- Powerplant: 2 × Turbomeca Astazou XIVD turboprop engines, 690 kW (920 hp) each

Performance

- Maximum speed: 500 km/h (310 mph, 270 kn)
- Range: 3,000 km (1,900 mi, 1,600 nmi)
- Service ceiling: 9,000 m (30,000 ft)
- Take-off run: 600 m (2,000 ft)

== See also ==
Aircraft of comparable role, configuration, and era

- Dassault Communauté
- FMA IA 50 Guaraní II
- Grumman Gulfstream I
- Handley Page Jetstream
