= Dominion Skytrader =

Utility aircraft prototype

Skytrader
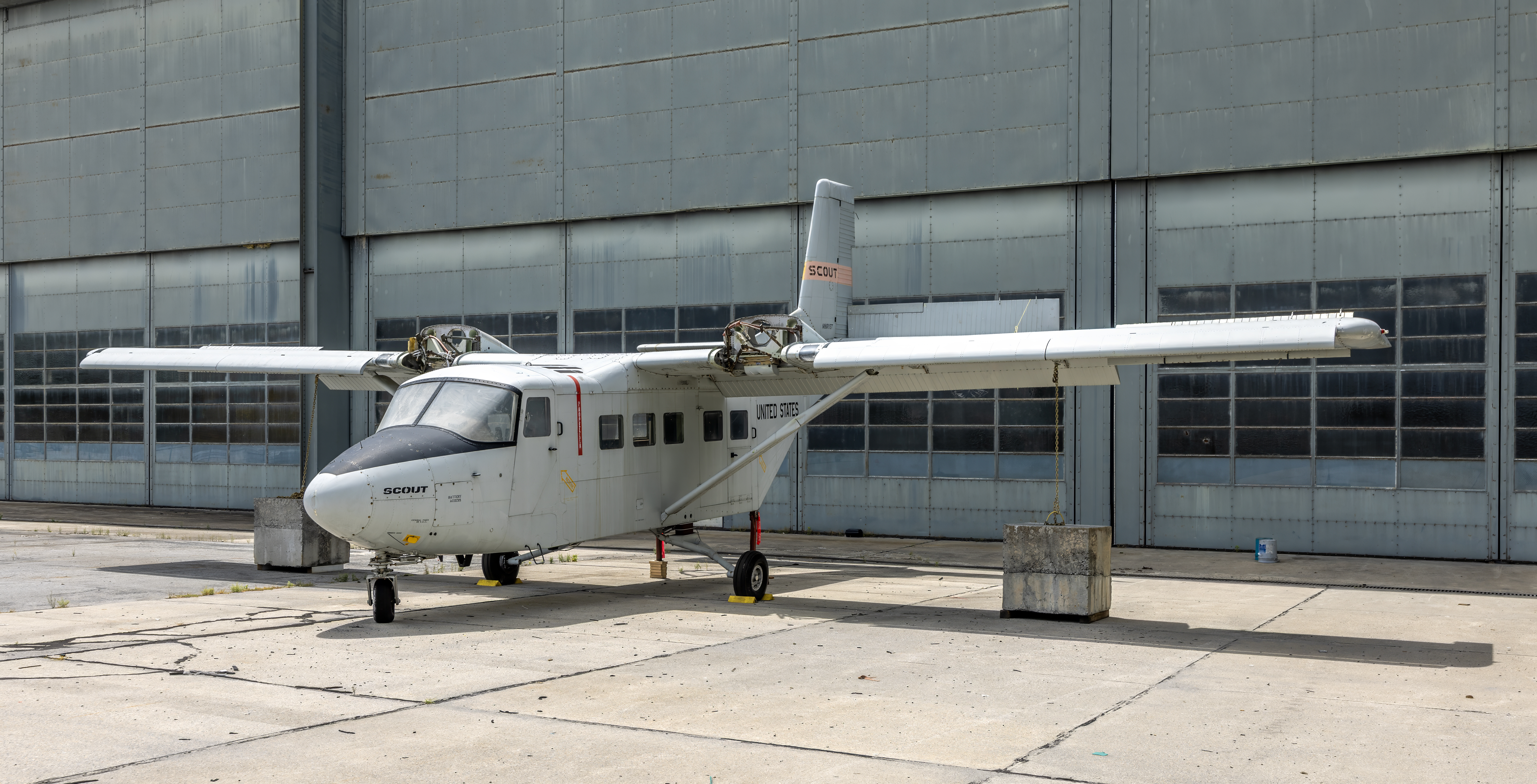
- UV-23A at Hagerstown Regional Airport in 2026

General information
- Type: STOL utility aircraft
- Manufacturer: Dominion Aircraft Corporation
- Designer: Larry Matanski
- Status: Retired
- Number built: 1

History
- First flight: 21 April 1975

The Dominion Skytrader was a Canadian prototype STOL utility aircraft, originally designed by the Dominion Aircraft Corporation in Vancouver, British Columbia, but built in the United States in the early 1970s. Attempts to market the aircraft continued until the late 1980s, but proved fruitless.

== Design and development ==
The Skytrader was a conventional high-wing, strut-braced monoplane with fixed tricycle undercarriage. The design was optimised for easy freight handling and featured a fuselage of rectangular cross-section with large loading doors to the side and a loading ramp at the rear. The aircraft's tail unit was angled upwards from the rear fuselage to facilitate loading operations beneath it, and the main undercarriage was fitted in sponsons on the fuselage sides so as not to intrude into the internal cargo volume. Passenger, freight, executive transport, and water-bomber versions were projected.

Dominion Aircraft Corporation president Larry Matanski was also the designer with work on the aircraft commencing in 1971. All engineering and contract work was subcontracted to a plant in Reston, Washington. Manufacturing was to take place in Vancouver. The prototype flew on 21 April 1975. Marketing the aircraft proved difficult, however, and despite a flurry of initial interest, by 1977, only two firm orders were known to have been placed. Two years later, the bank that had been financing the project collapsed and Dominion Aircraft Corporation Ltd. went bankrupt. The prototype and the program were purchased the following year by Grant MacCoon, and over the next few years were bought and sold by a number of entities, finally becoming the property of a new firm, Skytrader Corporation, in 1984.

Skytrader proposed a revised version of the original design as the Skytrader ST1700 or Conestoga. This had a stretched cabin, T-tail, redesigned nose, wings, and landing gear, and was to be turboprop powered. A scaled-down version was to be offered as the ST1400 Commuterliner. Apart from passenger and freight versions, dedicated military versions were also proposed as the Evader, carrying 26 troops, or the smaller Scout. This would have been able to carry 12–15 troops and provision was made for armament in the form of 2.75 in air-to-ground rockets. In 1987, Skytrader announced a deal with Mitsui that would provide $20.5 million to fund FAA certification of the ST1700, and initial production of the Scout.

The Mitsui money never appeared, and the following year, Skytrader made co-production deals with the government of the Philippines and Samsung, but these did not eventuate either. The final chapter in the Skytrader's development was the entry of the Scout in a US Army competition for an intelligence gathering aircraft.

During the late 1980s, the U.S. Southern Command became interested in acquiring a reconnaissance aircraft which would do well in the rugged terrain and with the clandestine operations that the command was executing at the time. A contest, named Grizzly Hunter, was opened for interested contractors to enter candidate aircraft for consideration.

== Operational history ==
The Scout was entered as a joint project between Skytrader and McDonnell Douglas Helicopter, and was selected as the winning design, receiving the designation UV-23. Revisions to the original Scout design included blown wings and new propellers and gearboxes to significantly reduce the aircraft's IR and noise signatures. The Skytrader 800 prototype was re-engined at this point, and flew with Turbomeca Astazou XIV turboprops.

Before any production of the UV-23 could be undertaken, however, Grizzly Hunter was cancelled and replaced by a different requirement which was won by the RC-7. With the US Army order falling through, Skytrader declared bankruptcy with intentions on continuing operations but was liquidated in August 1989.

As of 2007, the prototype lay derelict, with engines stripped, at Washington County Regional Airport, in Hagerstown, Maryland.

== Variants ==
Skytrader 800
Dominion Aircraft version with Lycoming IO-720 engines (1 built)
ST-1700
Skytrader Corp version with Pratt & Whitney Canada PT6 engines and many airframe changes (not built)
Scout
Militarised ST-1700, designated UV-23 for US Army

== Specifications (Skytrader 800) ==
Data from Jane's All The World's Aircraft

General characteristics

- Crew: Two pilots
- Capacity: 12 passengers
- Length: 41 ft 0 in (12.50 m)
- Wingspan: 55 ft 0 in (16.76 m)
- Height: 18 ft 10.75 in (5.76 m)
- Wing area: 385 sq ft (35.77 m^{2})
- Empty weight: 4,950 lb (2,245 kg)
- Gross weight: 8,500 lb (3,855 kg)
- Powerplant: 2 × Lycoming IO-720-B1A eight-cylinder air-cooled horizontally opposed piston engine , 400 hp (298 kW) each

Performance

- Maximum speed: 210 mph (338 km/h, 180 kn)
- Cruise speed: 150 mph (241 km/h, 130 kn) (Note: @55% power)
- Range: 1,430 mi (2,300 km, 1,240 nmi)
- Service ceiling: 17,500 ft (5,355 m)
- Rate of climb: 1,600 ft/min (8.1 m/s)
