= Pan Am Flight 281 =

1968 aircraft hijacking

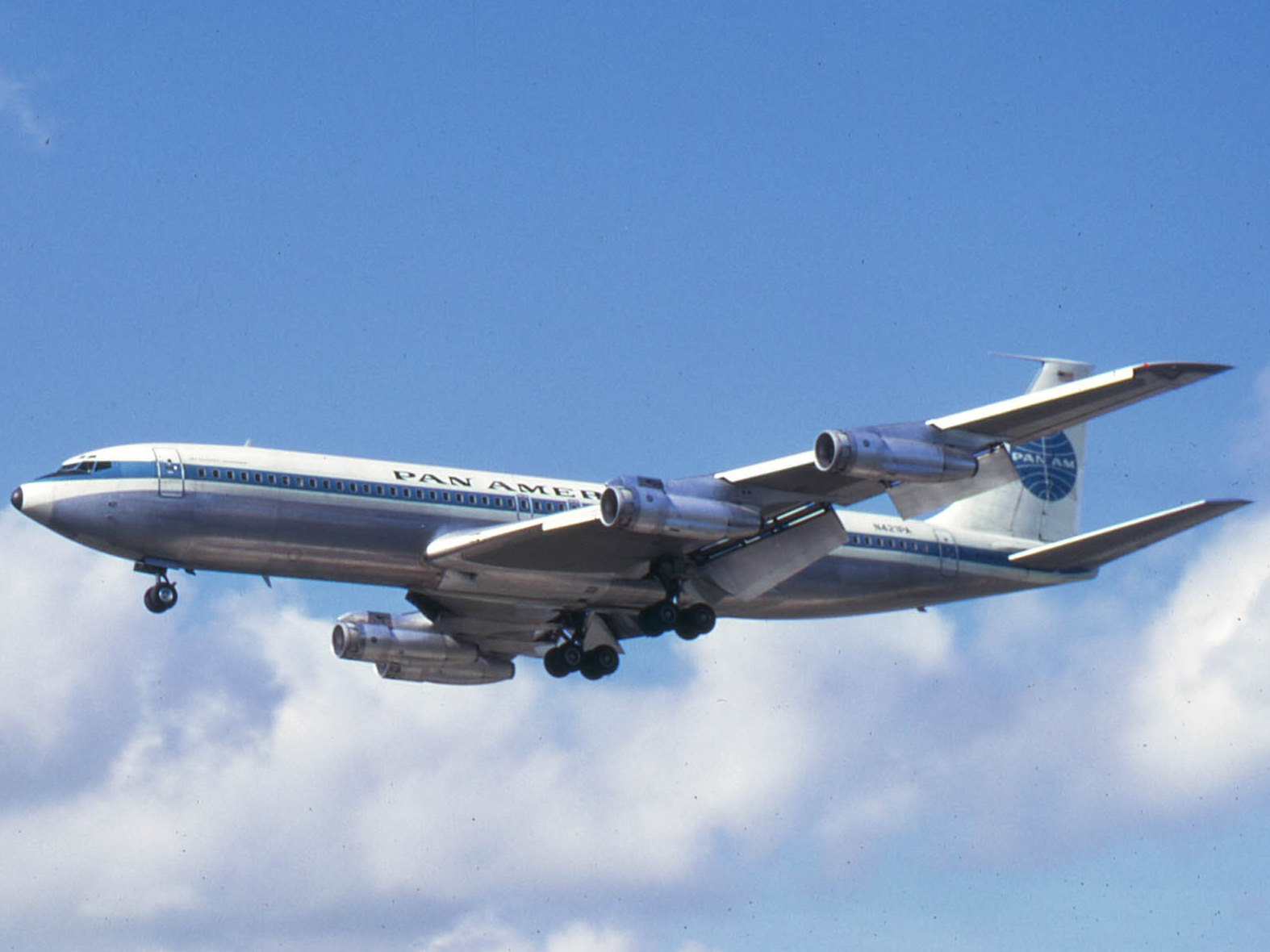
- A Pan Am Boeing 707 similar to the hijacked aircraft

Hijack
- Date: November 24, 1968
- Summary: Aircraft hijacking
- Site: United States and Cuba

Aircraft
- Aircraft type: Boeing 707
- Operator: Pan Am
- Call sign: CLIPPER 281
- Registration: Unknown
- Flight origin: John F. Kennedy International Airport, New York, United States
- Stopover: Havana, Cuba
- Destination: San Juan, Puerto Rico, United States
- Occupants: 103
- Passengers: 96
- Crew: 7
- Fatalities: 0
- Survivors: 103

Pan Am Flight 281 was a regularly scheduled Pan American World Airways flight to San Juan, Puerto Rico, operated by a Boeing 707. It was hijacked on November 24, 1968, by four men from JFK International Airport, New York City to Havana, Cuba. U.S. jet fighter aircraft followed the plane until it reached Cuban airspace.

Two of the hijackers were apprehended in the 1970s. Jose Rafael Rios Cruz was arrested in 1975; Miguel Castro was captured in 1976. Both pleaded guilty; Cruz was sentenced to 15 years in prison and Castro to 12.

A third hijacker, Luis Armando Peña Soltren, lived as a fugitive in Cuba. In October 2009, he voluntarily returned to the United States and surrendered to federal authorities. He pleaded guilty to the hijacking on March 18, 2010. On January 4, 2011 he was sentenced to 15 years in prison, without the possibility of parole.

Alejandro Figueroa, charged as a co-conspirator in the case, was acquitted in 1969.
