= Alitalia Flight 660 =

1968 fatal crash of a Douglas DC-8 in Italy

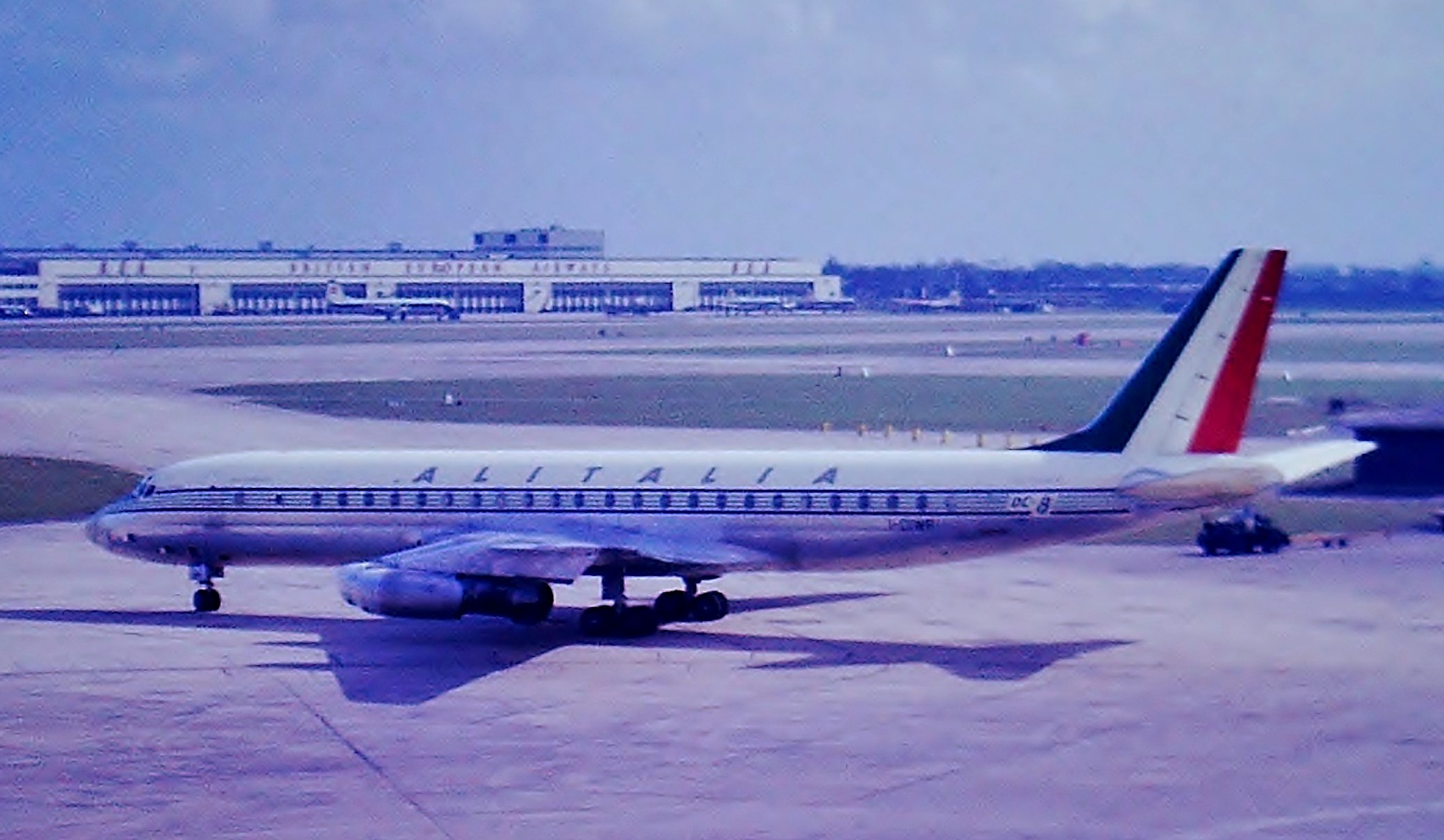
- I-DIWF, the aircraft involved in the accident, seen in 1963

Accident
- Date: 2 August 1968
- Summary: CFIT; instrument interference, pilot error, & ATC error compounded by severe weather
- Site: Mount San Giacomo, Vergiate Municipality, Italy

Aircraft
- Aircraft type: Douglas DC-8-43
- Aircraft name: Antoniotto Usodimare
- Operator: Alitalia
- IATA flight No.: AZ660
- ICAO flight No.: AZA660
- Call sign: ALITALIA 660
- Registration: I-DIWF
- Flight origin: Rome Fiumicino Airport, Italy
- Stopover: Milan Malpensa Airport, Italy
- Destination: Montréal–Trudeau International Airport, Canada
- Occupants: 95
- Passengers: 85
- Crew: 10
- Fatalities: 12
- Injuries: 22
- Survivors: 83

Alitalia Flight 660 was a regularly scheduled international flight operating from Rome Fiumicino Airport, Italy, to Montréal–Trudeau International Airport, with a stopover in Milan Malpensa Airport. On 2 August 1968, while on approach to Milan, the aircraft, a Douglas DC-8, crashed into Mount San Giacomo. Every passenger and crew member survived the initial impact, but 12 passengers were killed by the subsequent fire.

== Background ==
=== Aircraft ===
The aircraft involved in the accident was a 6 year old Douglas DC-8-43, registered as I-DIWF. It had the manufacturing serial number 45630/159 after being manufactured in 1962, with just under 22,000 flight hours. The plane was equipped with four Rolls-Royce Conway 508-12 turbofan engines.

=== Crew ===
The captain on board flight 660 was Fabio Staffieri, who was reported to be "an experienced pilot". The other three cockpit crew members were co-pilot Franco Panario, flight engineer Giovanni Tosti, and Navigator Pasquale Caloggi.

== Accident ==
The flight was originally supposed to begin boarding sometime after 2:30 in the afternoon, but captain Staffieri, was in a rush to get to Malpensa before the storm would hit, and forced the boarding to start at about 1:50. The boarding proceeded as usual, and all passengers were boarded before 2:05. The engines were started, and the aircraft taxied to runway 16R, and took off at 2:15. The flight climbed to cruising altitude. The cruise at 22,000 ft and descent to 18,000 ft were routine.

At 2:57, the aircraft was cleared to descend from 9,000 ft to 4,000 ft, which would bring it into the tops of the storm clouds. The crew began the descent, with the weather at Malpensa previously being reported by the air traffic controller as:

"At Malpensa we have wind from 320° with gusts up to 25 knots, maximum up to 40; there is a storm in progress with two-eighths of cumulonimbus clouds at 2500 feet,… sorry, seven-eighths of cumulonimbus clouds at 3000 feet, QNH 1009. Call back if you intend to continue or stop over Voghera pending improvement.”

The crew chose to continue the approach into Malpensa, and the controller, before handing the aircraft off to Milan, told them to instead hold 5,000 ft before descending to 4,000 ft. Approximately 7 miles south of runway 35 at 2:59, the plane was cleared to make the descent to 4,000 ft, but strangely, the aircraft didn't respond, and 20 seconds later, the controller called again, but this time, the crew responded, acknowledging their clearance. At 2:59:50, the aircraft, even though it was supposed to already be at 4,000 ft, was actually at 13,600 ft and descending at 3,000 feet per minute. When the crew finally reached 4,000 ft, it was 3:04, in severe turbulence, and the flight data recorder was recording oscillation peaks of positive 2gs and negative 1.5gs. The crew believed that they were locked on to the ILS signal, but in reality, they were over a kilometer away. This was due to the amount of electromagnetic waves within the clouds, which were interfering with the signals from the ground. At 3:00, the crew made contact with Malpensa tower, which gave them an updated weather report, being:

"Alitalia Six Six Zero, Malpensa tower, good morning to you. Continue for ILS 35 right. QNH is One Zero Zero Nine and QFE South Nine Eight Four. You are number one. No other traffic reported. There is currently a severe thunderstorm. In fact, we have eight/eighths of cumulonimbus clouds at 1,000 feet and a north wind of 30 knots with gusts up to 40 and visibility of 800 meters. Report leaving the outer marker and 2,000."

Despite the crew confirming that they had passed the outer marker, they weren't at 2,000 ft, they were actually at 9,200 ft and descending. At 3:04, the crew extended the flaps and landing gear, and they began making the final preparations for landing, despite now being north of the end of runway 35. The crew finally emerged from the clouds, and captain Staffieri, knowing the terrain well, recognized the fact that they were not lined up with the runway at Malpensa, and were actually lined up with the runway at Vergate Field, and decided to go-around, and make a 180-degree turn to head back towards the correct airport. Co-pilot Panario raised the flaps and gear, and pushed the power to full. Staffieri, even after going around, could not get the plane to climb. In a last ditch attempt, he took the engines to idle power, and pulled the nose as far back as he could in preparation for the impact. At 3:06, the aircraft impacted Mt. San Giacomo tail first, and initially, everybody on board survived the crash. However, the aircraft, loaded with fuel for the trans-Atlantic flight, ignites into flames, and 12 passengers were unable to escape the aircraft in time, resulting in their deaths.

== Investigation ==
An investigation into the crash was quickly launched. The crash into the mountain was found to have happened because of a compounded result of pilot error, instrument interference, and ATC error, leading to the accident being classified as "Controlled flight into terrain". The probable cause of the accident is as follows:

Insufficient checking of flight times during the final portion of the approach; Positioning for final approach by means of a non standard procedure; Delayed detection of the VOR radial or wrong selection of such radial; Broken view of terrain north of the airport similar to that south of the airport.
