= Piper PA-35 Pocono =

Canceled American commuter airliner

PA-35 Pocono
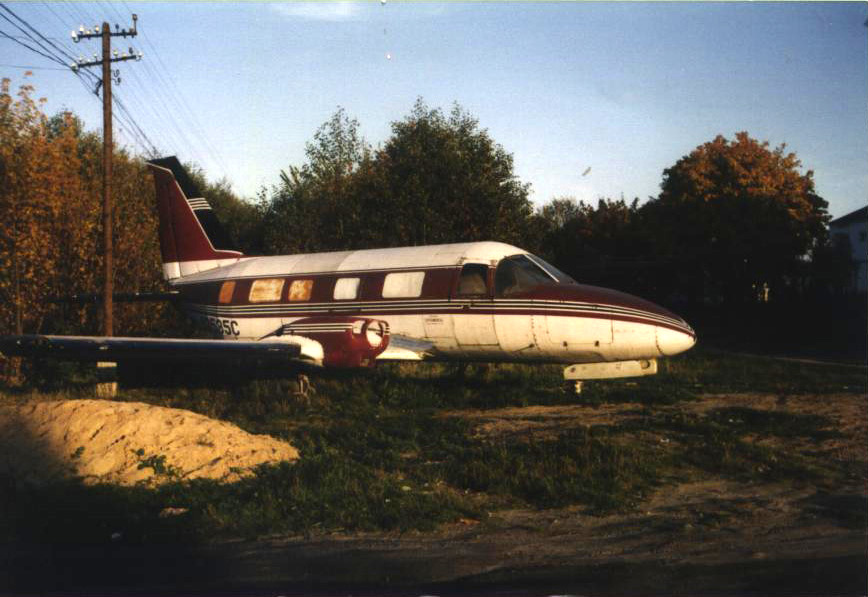
- The PA-35, still carrying tailnumber N3535C, preserved in Widełka in October 1995.

General information
- Type: 16/18 seat commuter monoplane
- National origin: United States
- Manufacturer: Piper Aircraft
- Status: Project abandoned
- Number built: 1

History
- First flight: 13 May 1968

The Piper PA-35 Pocono was an American 16/18 seat commuter airliner developed by Piper in the late 1960s. Only one aircraft was built and the design was not developed.

== Design and development ==
Piper started the design work in 1965 for a twin-engined piston non-pressurized commuter airliner and the prototype first flew on 13 May 1968. It was a low-wing monoplane that was intended to be powered by two 475 hp (354 kW) Lycoming TIO-720-B1A piston engines then under development. It was planned that the aircraft would be built at the new factory at Lakeland Municipal Airport in Florida. Due to problems during development the tail area was increased, the fuselage stretched and the engines uprated to 520 hp (388 kW) variants.

Development was stopped in 1969 initially to let the company develop other aircraft, but the halt was also influenced by the lack of a suitable engine and a number of third-level airline operators in the United States going out of business. In 1970 the company proposed a four-engined and a turboprop version, but they were not developed.

In about 1978 a cooperation program between Piper and WSK Mielec (Poland) was planned. As part of this one fuselage with wings was transported from Florida to Poland and a team of designers was assembled at the R&D Center in Mielec. The program was named M-19, with designer Tadeusz Widełka as the team leader. The program was abandoned when the An-28 program was launched in Mielec and the PA-35 fuselage was moved to the Technical University in Rzeszów. Later, probably in 1994, the aircraft was moved to the city of Widełka.

== Specifications (1969 variant) ==
Data from

General characteristics

- Crew: two
- Capacity: 16
- Length: 42 ft 4 in (12.91 m)
- Wingspan: 51 ft 0 in (15.55 m)
- Height: 17 ft 5 in (5.31 m)
- Empty weight: 5,572 lb (2,527 kg)
- Gross weight: 9,750 lb (4,423 kg)
- Powerplant: 2 × Lycoming TIO-720-B1A , 520 hp (388 kW) each

Performance

- Maximum speed: 260 mph (417 km/h, 230 kn)
- Cruise speed: 235 mph (377 km/h, 204 kn)
- Range: 700 mi (1,127 km, 610 nmi)
- Service ceiling: 29,000 ft (8,841 m)
- Rate of climb: 1,680 ft/min (8.5 m/s)
