= List of Spanish Civil War flying aces =

The following is a list of Spanish Civil War flying aces.

Name	Nationality	Service	Claims
Joaquín García Morato	Spain	Nationalist Air Force	40
Lev L. Shestakov	Soviet Union	Spanish Republican Air Force	2.5 (in Spain; 39 career)
Sergei I. Gritsevets	Soviet Union	Spanish Republican Air Force	6.5 approx. + 11 shared
Julio Salvador Díaz-Benjumea	Spain	Nationalist Air Force	24
José María Bravo	Spain	Spanish Republican Air Force	23
Manuel Zarauza Clavero	Spain	Spanish Republican Air Force	23
Manuel Vázquez Sagastizábal	Spain	Nationalist Air Force	21
Leopoldo Morquillas Rubio	Spain	Spanish Republican Air Force	21
Pavel Vasilievich Rychagov	Soviet Union	Spanish Republican Air Force	20
Mario Visintini	Italy	Aviazione Legionaria	19
Arístides García López	Spain	Nationalist Air Force	17
Alexander Osipenko	Soviet Union	Spanish Republican Air Force	17 + 34 shared
Ángel Salas Larrazábal	Spain	Nationalist Air Force	16
Mario Bonzano	Italy	Aviazione Legionaria	15
Brunetto di Montegnacco	Italy	Aviazione Legionaria	15
Werner Mölders	Germany	Condor Legion	14
Guido Presel	Italy	Aviazione Legionaria	13
Vittorino Daffara	Italy	Aviazione Legionaria	13
Wolfgang Schellmann	Germany	Condor Legion	12
Harro Harder	Germany	Condor Legion	11
Andrés García La Calle	Spain	Spanish Republican Air Force	11
Manuel Aguirre López	Spain	Spanish Republican Air Force	11
Adriano Mantelli	Italy	Aviazione Legionaria	10
Peter Boddem	Germany	Condor Legion	10
Rodolphe de Hemricourt	Belgium	Nationalist Air Force	10
Abel Guides	France	Spanish Republican Air Force	10
Guido Nobili	Italy	Aviazione Legionaria	9
Andrea Zotti	Italy	Aviazione Legionaria	9
Otto Bertram	Germany	Condor Legion	9 (Note: including three unconfirmed claims)
Wilhelm Ensslen	Germany	Condor Legion	9
Herbert Ihlefeld	Germany	Condor Legion	9 (Note: including two unconfirmed claims)
Walter Oesau	Germany	Condor Legion	9
Reinhard Seiler	Germany	Condor Legion	9
Giuseppe Cenni	Italy	Aviazione Legionaria	8
Enrico Degli Incerti	Italy	Aviazione Legionaria	8
Herwig Knüppel	Germany	Condor Legion	8
Anatoly Serov	Soviet Union	Spanish Republican Air Force	8
Hans-Karl Mayer	Germany	Condor Legion	8 (Note: including one unconfirmed claim, potentially two further undocumented claims)
Frank Glasgow Tinker	United States	Spanish Republican Air Force	8
Jan Ferák	Czechoslovakia	Spanish Republican Air Force	7
Giuseppe Majone	Italy	Aviazione Legionaria	7
Kraft Eberhardt	Germany	Condor Legion	7
Walter Grabmann	Germany	Condor Legion	7 (Note: including one unconfirmed claim)
Horst Tietzen	Germany	Condor Legion	7
Wilhelm Balthasar	Germany	Condor Legion	6
Emilio O'Connor Valdivieso	Spain	Nationalist Air Force	6
José "Pepe" Larios	Spain	Nationalist Air Force	6 (and 5 probable)
Rolf Pingel	Germany	Condor Legion	6
Kurt Rochel	Germany	Condor Legion	6
Herbert Schob	Germany	Condor Legion	6
Francisco Tarazona Torán	Mexico	Spanish Republican Air Force	6
Gilberto Caselli	Italy	Aviazione Legionaria	5
Georg Braunshirn	Germany	Condor Legion	5
Gotthard Handrick	Germany	Condor Legion	5 (Note: including four unconfirmed claims)
Wolf-Heinrich von Houwald	Germany	Condor Legion	5
Wolfgang Lippert	Germany	Condor Legion	5
Günther Lützow	Germany	Condor Legion	5
James Peck	United States	Spanish Republican Air Force	5
Joachim Schlichting	Germany	Condor Legion	5
Willi Szuggar	Germany	Condor Legion	5
Hannes Trautloft	Germany	Condor Legion	5
Božidar "Boško" Petrović	Yugoslavia	Spanish Republican Air Force	5

== See also ==
- Spanish Air and Space Force
- Aviación Nacional
- Spanish Republican Air Force
