= Vladimir Bobrov (pilot) =

Soviet fighter pilot

Vladimir Ivanovich Bobrov
- Владимир Иванович Бобров
- Born: 11 July 1915; Luhansk, Russian Empire
- Died: 28 March 1970 (aged 54); Kharkov, Ukrainian SSR, Soviet Union
- Military career
- Allegiance: Soviet Union
- Branch: Soviet Air Force
- Service years: 1939—1945
- Rank: Colonel
- Commands: 237th Fighter Aviation Regiment; 521st Fighter Aviation Regiment; 21st Fighter Aviation Regiment; 161st Fighter Aviation Regiment; 27th Fighter Aviation Regiment; 104th Guards Fighter Aviation Regiment
- Conflicts: Spanish Civil War; World War II; Winter War; Eastern Front
- Awards: Hero of the Soviet Union (posthumous)

Vladimir Ivanovich Bobrov (Russian: Владимир Иванович Бобров; 11 July 1915 – 28 March 1970) was a Soviet fighter pilot and a flying ace in both Spanish Civil War and the Great Patriotic War. By the most reliable estimates, his tally stands between 19 solo and five shared to 23 solo and eleven shared shootdowns during World War II. He was posthumously awarded the title Hero of Soviet Union in 1991.

== Early life ==
Bobrov was born on 11 July 1915 in Luhansk to a working-class family. In 1930, he graduated from the tenth grade of the school. In 1932, he graduated from a professional technical school of factory apprenticeship, after which he worked as a foreman of locksmiths at the Lugansk steam locomotive repair plant. In 1934, he was called up to serve in the Workers and Peasants Red Army.

== Military career ==
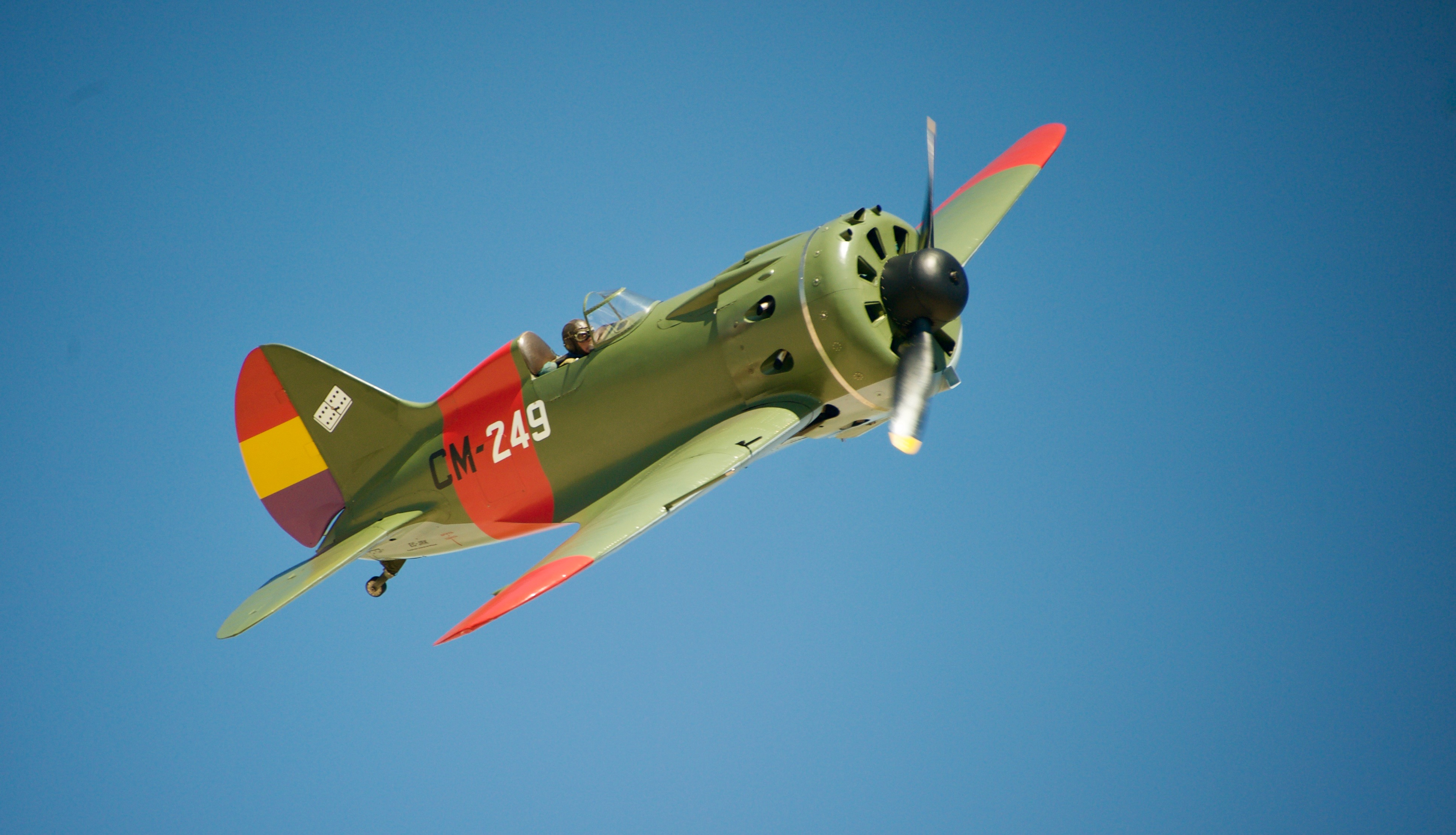
Polikarpov I-16 in Spanish Republican markings

In 1936, he graduated from the military school of pilots and became a pilot within the Red Air Force. He later served as a junior pilot within the Air Force of the Belarusian Military District. From March 1938 to August 1938, Bobrov fought in the Spanish Civil War as a foreign volunteer for the Republican Government. Flying Polikarpov I-16 with the Republican Air Force, he was credited with 13 solo and 4 shared aerial victories against Aviación Nacional, while flying 126 missions, which includes 47 dogfights. After his return to USSR, he flew missions during the Winter War. He later served in the 4th and 10th Fighter Aviation Regiments. In 1941 he graduated from the Lipetsk higher aviation advanced training courses for squadron commanders. On the same year, he joined the Communist Party of Soviet Union.

Following the outbreak of Operation Barbarossa in June 1941, Bobrov scored his first aerial victory of the war, when he shot down a Luftwaffe Heinkel He 111 bomber, while flying a Yak-1. Soon he was hit by enemy fire, which resulted him in being badly burned and injured. As a result, he was hospitalized. In July 1941, he was appointed as commander of the 237th Fighter Aviation Regiment.

After recovering, Bobrov took part in battles with the Northwestern, Baltic, Kalinin and 1st Ukrainian fronts. In February 1942, Bobrov was assigned as commander of the 521st Fighter Aviation Regiment. From October 1942 to April 1943, he served as commander of the 21st Fighter Aviation Regiment and 161st Fighter Aviation Regiment.

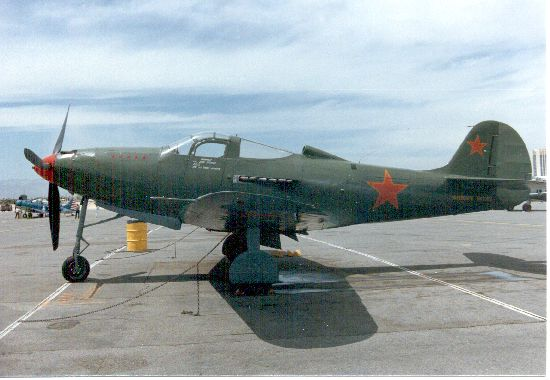
P-39 Airacobra in Red Air Force markings

On 4 April 1943, he became the commander of the 27th Fighter Aviation Regiment, where he flew the Bell P-39 Airacobra. At the beginning of 1944, Bobrov was removed from the command of the regiment, according to some information, this happened due to the personal hostility of representatives of the highest command personnel. As a result, he served as pilot technique inspector of the 190th Fighter Aviation Division from March 1944 to April 1944. In May 1944, fighter ace Alexander Pokryshkin invited Bobrov to his 9th Guards Fighter Aviation Division, where he became the commander of the 104th Guards Fighter Aviation Regiment. Bobrov's regiment took part in a number of offensive operations, including the breakthrough of the German defenses on the Neisse River and the Berlin offensive.

By 24 July 1944, Bobrov flew 424 sorties, during which he conducted 112 dogfights, and was credited with 23 solo and 11 shared aerial victories. According to other sources, Bobrov was credited with a total of 43 solo and 24 shared aerial victories in both Spanish Civil War and the Great Patriotic War. He also flew a total of 577 sorties, during which he conducted a 159 air battles, in both the wars.

On 11 August 1944, Bobrov was nominated for the title of Hero of the Soviet Union, but chief marshal of aviation Alexander Novikov and colonel general Konstantin Vershinin refused to present him the award.

== Later life ==
After the end of the war, Bobrov continued to serve in the Soviet Air Force. In 1952, he completed refresher courses for commanders and chiefs of staff of air divisions at the Air Force Academy. In 1960, he was transferred to the reserve with the rank of colonel.

In 1966, Bobrov graduated from a law institute, after which he worked as deputy director of the Institute "Giprokommunstroy". He lived in Kharkov, where he died on 28 March 1970.

By the decree of the President of the USSR of 20 March 1991, for “courage and military valor displayed during the Great Patriotic War,” Bobrov was posthumously awarded the title of Hero of the Soviet Union, along with the Order of Lenin. The award was presented to his relatives.

== Dates of rank ==
- Lieutenant, Red Air Force: 1936
- Captain, Red Air Force: 1939
- Major, Red Air Force: 1942
- Lieutenant colonel, Red Air Force: 1943
- Colonel, Soviet Air Force: 1948
- Major, Soviet Air Force: 1953 (demoted by two ranks)
- Lieutenant colonel, Soviet Air Force: 1956
- Colonel, Soviet Air Force: 1958

== Awards and honors ==
Hero of the Soviet Union (20 March 1991 posthumously)
Order of Lenin, twice (27 April 1942, 20 March 1991 posthumously)
Order of the Red Banner, four times (23 February 1939, 11 August 1943, 12 May 1945, 6 November 1954)
Order of Suvorov, 3rd class (18 May 1945)
Order of Alexander Nevsky (25 September 1944)
Order of the Patriotic War, 1st class (29 January 1944)
Order of the Red Star, twice (15 November 1950, 16 October 1957)
Medal "For Battle Merit" (3 November 1944)
Medal "For the Liberation of Prague" (1945)
Medal "For the Capture of Berlin" (1945)
Medal "For the Victory over Germany in the Great Patriotic War 1941–1945" (1945)
Jubilee Medal "Twenty Years of Victory in the Great Patriotic War 1941-1945" (1965)
Jubilee Medal "30 Years of the Soviet Army and Navy" (1948)
Jubilee Medal "40 Years of the Armed Forces of the USSR" (1958)
Jubilee Medal "50 Years of the Armed Forces of the USSR" (1968)
War Cross 1939–1945 (Czechoslovakia)
