= La Gloriosa =

La Gloriosa may refer to:

- Glorious Revolution (Spain)
- Spanish Republican Air Force
