= Frank Glasgow Tinker =

American flying ace (1909–1939)

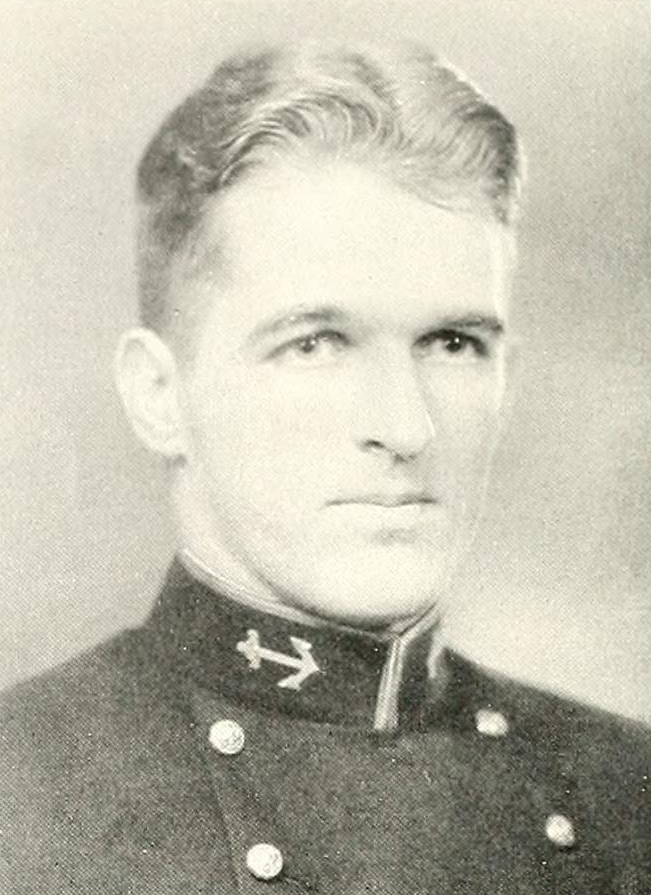
- Tinker in the United States Naval Academy yearbook, 1933
- Born: July 14, 1909; Kaplan, Louisiana, U.S.
- Died: June 13, 1939 (aged 29) Little Rock, Arkansas, U.S.
- Allegiance: United States; Spanish Republic
- Branch: United States Navy; Republican Air Force
- Conflicts: Spanish Civil War
- Education: United States Naval Academy (BS)

Frank Glasgow Tinker (July 14, 1909 – June 13, 1939) was an American volunteer fighter pilot for the Fuerzas Aéreas de la República Española ("Air Forces of the Spanish Republic"; FARE), during the Spanish Civil War.

Tinker was credited officially with shooting down eight enemy aircraft and was the highest-scoring American air ace of the war. However, Tinker's logbook suggests that he claimed 19 victories, which would make him the sixth-highest scoring pilot in FARE. That relatively few of his claims were officially recognized was due to the complex system of verifying air kills used by FARE and the financial incentive paid to mercenaries: many victories were not verifiable because the downed aircraft crashed in an enemy-held area and/or an incentive would not have to be paid. In addition, Tinker and other pilots from Escuadrilla La Calle ("La Calle's Squadron"), also known as 1ª Escuadrilla de Chatos (1st Chato Squadron"), shared a number of joint kills against Junkers Ju 52 bombers. He reported narrowly avoiding death at both the hands of enemy aviators and malfunctioning equipment.

He left a detailed record of his experiences as a fighter pilot for the Republicans in his memoir Some Still Live, published by Funk & Wagnalls Co in New York, 1938 and republished by The Clapton Press, London, in 2019.

== Early years ==
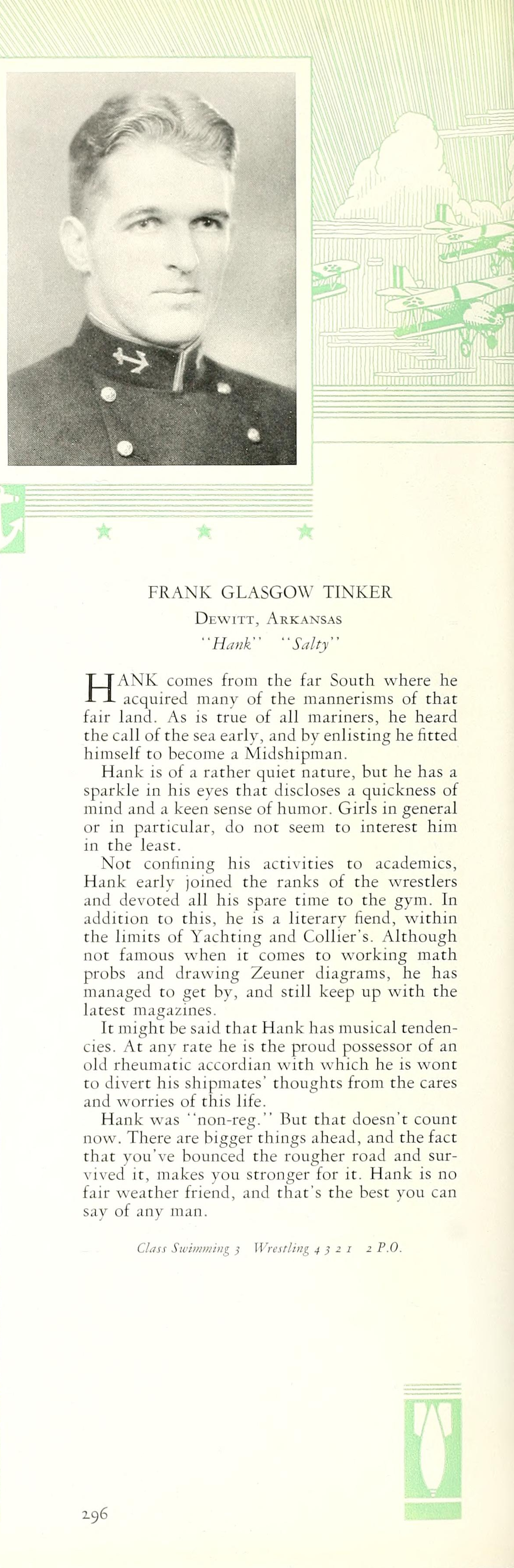
Tinker in the United States Naval Academy yearbook, 1933

Frank Tinker was born in Kaplan, Louisiana, and grew up in DeWitt, Arkansas. In 1926, he joined the US Navy hoping to gain an appointment to the US Naval Academy, which he did three years later. Graduating with the Class of '33, he did not receive a commission, along with the other lower half of the class, due to the Great Depression. He and other classmates then enrolled in the United States Army Air Corps, and received flight training at Randolph Field. In 1934, he received his naval commission, flight training at Pensacola, Florida, and assigned as a reconnaissance floatplane pilot on the USS San Francisco cruiser. Lasting only six months as an ensign in the navy, due to a brawl in Long Beach, and another in Honolulu, the navy dissolved his commission. Tinker then became a third mate on a Standard Oil tanker.

== Spanish Civil War ==
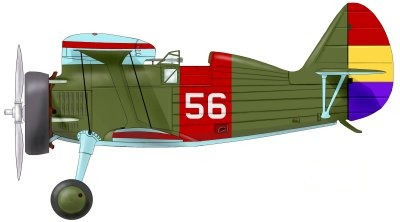
The I-15 Polikarpov No. 56 flown by F.G. Tinker in the 1st Sq Lacalle. He scored four victories in this aircraft. Occasionally he flew No. 58 as well.

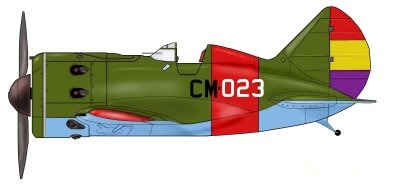
The I-16 Polikarpov No. CM-023 flown by F.G. Tinker in the 1st Sq Moscas with which he shot down two German Bf 109Bs.

After the start of the Spanish Civil War, Tinker offered his service to the Loyalist Government. Tinker disliked Benito Mussolini after Ethiopia, and Mussolini's support of the Rebels. After signing a contract with the Spanish Embassy in Mexico City, he received a Spanish passport with the nom de guerre of Francisco Gómez Trejo. His contract included $1500 per month, and an additional $1000 for each enemy plane he downed. Tinker then traveled by train to New York City, boarded the SS Normandie for France, then traveled by train to Barcelona. At the San Xavier field in Los Alcázares, he checked out as a combat pilot, joining Harold Edward Dahl, Albert Baumler, and other American pilots and English pilots at Manises Air Base.

From 7 January 1937, Tinker along with Dahl and Charlie Koch, joined three British and one Irish pilot in Walter Kantz's 19 Bomber Squadron, flying Breguet 19 bombers.

On 23 January, Tinker, Koch, Allison, Dahl, Leider. and 12 Spanish pilots, joined Andrés García La Calle's Wright Cyclone powered Polikarpov I-15 squadron in Los Alcázares. On 10 February, now based at Guadalajara, they flew their first mission over enemy territory, each dropping four 24-pound bombs onto factories along the Jarama.

The squadron took part in the Battle of Guadalajara. On March 14, Tinker shot down his first aircraft, an Italian Fiat CR.32 fighter, followed by another CR.32 on March 20. On April 17, he shot down a German Heinkel He 51 fighter from Legion Condor over Teruel.

On May 3, 1937, Tinker and Baumler, the remaining American fighter pilots, were assigned to Ivan A. Lakeev's squadron, and on 30 May, started flying the Polikarpov I-16.

On 2 and 16 June, he shot down two more CR.32s. On 12 July, he became the first American combat pilot to shoot down a Messerschmitt Bf 109. On 17 July, Tinker shot down another Bf 109A, and on 18 July, another CR.32. On 29 July, Tinker made his last flight in Spain.

While in Spain, Tinker socialized with Ernest Hemingway, Herbert Matthews, Martha Gellhorn, Henry Tilton Gorrell, and members of the Lincoln Brigade.

== Later years and death ==
After Tinker's return to the US, both the Army and Navy rejected his requested return to service. Instead, he wrote articles for various magazines and newspapers, including his Some Still Live series for the Saturday Evening Post. He was found in his Little Rock hotel room with a fatal gunshot wound to his head, an empty whiskey bottle, and an acceptance letter from the Flying Tigers. His tombstone included the epitaph ¿Quién Sabe? (Who knows?).

Arkansas Aviation Historical Society inducted Tinker into the Arkansas Aviation Hall of Fame in 1999.

On July 11, 2009, the centennial of his birth, his niece and the Grand Prairie Historical Society honored his memory in a DeWitt, Arkansas ceremony.

== See also ==
- Yankee Squadron
- PTSD

== Bibliography ==
- Edwards, John Carver (1997). Airmen Without Portfolio: U.S. Mercenaries in Civil War Spain. Westport, CT: Praeger. ISBN 0-275-95742-X.
