= José María Bravo =

Spanish Republican fighter pilot and flying ace (1917-2009)

José María Bravo Fernández-Hermosa
- Born: 19 May 1917; Madrid, Kingdom of Spain
- Died: 26 December 2009 (aged 92) Madrid, Spain
- Allegiance: Second Spanish Republic; Soviet Union; Spain
- Branch: Spanish Republican Air Force; Soviet Air Force; Spanish Air Force
- Active: 1936–1948
- Rank: Colonel
- Conflicts: Spanish Civil War; Levante Offensive; Battle of the Ebro; Catalonia Offensive; World War II; Partisan operations; Battle of the Caucasus
- Other work: Educator, translator

José María Bravo Fernández-Hermosa (8 April 1917 – 26 December 2009) was a Spanish Republican fighter pilot and flying ace. During the Spanish Civil War, he fought for the Second Republic and later for the Soviet Union in the Second World War. Until his death in 2009, he was the highest-scoring Spanish fighter pilot still alive.

== Early life ==
José María Bravo was born Madrid in 1917 and studied at the Institución Libre de Enseñanza, where he was considered a good student. His good grades won him a place at a study-abroad program in Germany.

== Spanish Civil War and exile ==
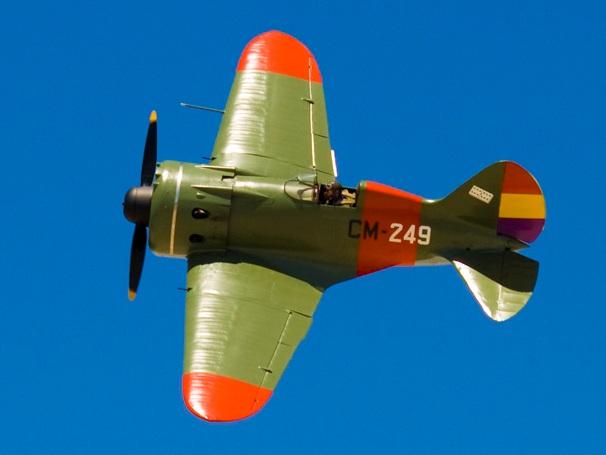
Polikarpov I-16 of the Fundación Infante de Orleans painted in the colors of the FARE. Its code is CM-249, which had been flown by Bravo during his wartime career.

Upon the outbreak of the Spanish Civil War in July 1936, Bravo volunteered to serve in the Spanish Republican Air Force (FARE). He had already flown gliders. Bravo was accepted and traveled to the Soviet Union as part of the first course of pilots, and underwent six months of training in Kirovabad (later Ganja, Azerbaijan).

Bravo returned to Spain in June 1937 as a non-commissioned fighter pilot and an expert in the state-of-the-art Polikarpov I-16 monoplanes. He flew with Russian pilots in the 1ª Escuadrilla de Moscas. His command abilities and charisma earned him multiple promotions: Teniente (11 March 1938) and Capitán (31 May 1938).

He was put in command of the 3ª Escuadrilla de Moscas and participated in the battles of the Levante and Ebro. This squadron achieved the most aerial victories during the Levante Campaign, with 10 credited to Bravo. On 27 August 1938, he became the adjutant of Grupo 21 de Caza (under the command of Manuel Zarauza Clavero and composed of I-16 fighters) at only 22 years old. The Republican defeat at the Ebro made imminent Republican defeat inevitable and the Catalonia Offensive forced the remaining Republican pilots to flee to France, Bravo among them. He was credited with 23 individual aerial victories achieved during 160 aerial combats and 1200 flying hours. He flew the I-16s marked CM-193 y CM-249.

Following the defeat and dissolution of the Republic in 1939, Bravo went into exile – initially in France. He was detained in camps for asylum seekers at Gurs and Argelès-sur-Mer in southern France, but was able to make his way to the Soviet Union. He resumed his studies at Járkov (Ukraine).

== Second World War ==
Following the invasion of the Soviet Union in 1941, Bravo tried to join the Soviet Air Forces (VVS). He was initially unable, as the VVS did not accept foreign aircrew; instead, Bravo served with Soviet ground forces, in a unit laying mines and carrying out sabotage, in the Azov area.

In 1942, the VVS accepted several former Spanish Republican pilots, including Bravo. He served initially in the Caucasus campaign. He again flew the I-16 Mosca – this time, the much-improved Type 17 variant. Bravo also received special training in night operations. He served in various postings, flying fighters including the Hawker Hurricane, Supermarine Spitfire and Curtiss Kittyhawk.

By late 1943, Bravo was in command of an independent fighter squadron, which was entrusted with a wide range of missions. One of these sorties was the escort of two passenger planes to Iran – the passengers were later revealed to include Josef Stalin, travelling to a historic summit meeting with other Allied leaders (November-December 1943).

Bravo remained in the VVS until 1948, when he was released from service.

== Return to Spain ==
After leaving the VVS he went to Moscow, where he worked at the Instituto Pedagógico de Idiomas teaching Spanish. In 1960, he returned to Spain without too much trouble from the Franquist authorities due to his past as a Spanish Republican combatant and his residence in the Soviet Union. From 1976, he helped found the Asociación De Aviadores de la República (ADAR) to obtain recognition for the military service of Spanish Republican aviators. This having been achieved, in 1978, he was named a colonel in the Ejército del Aire, with all associated privileges. Since then he collaborated with the Fundación Infante de Orleans, especially in its project to acquire an I-16. He continued to attend aerial demonstrations until his death in Madrid at the end of 2009.

== Movie ==
In 2012 a biographical movie, El Español (English: "The Spaniard", "Испанец" in the original Russian), directed by Aleksandr Tsatsuev (Александр ЦАЦУЕВ) and starring Vladimir Panchik (Владимир ПАНЧИК) as Bravo, was screened.

== Memoir ==
- José María Bravo & Rafael de Madariaga (2007); El seis doble: Bravo y los Moscas en la Guerra Civil Española y en la Segunda Guerra Mundial, Madrid. ISBN 84-923450-6-3.

== See also ==
- List of Spanish Civil War flying aces
- Spanish Republican Air Force

== External links (Spanish) ==
- S.B.H.A.C., Galería de Militares Republicanos
- Nos deja José María Bravo, último "as" de la aviación republicana, Real Aero Club de España
- José María Bravo Fernández, el último gran 'as' de la República, El País
