= Andrés García La Calle =

Spanish squadron leader (1909 – 1975)

Andrés García Calle
- Born: February 4, 1909; Sestao, Spain
- Died: April 8, 1975 (aged 66); Santo Domingo, Dominican Republic
- Military career
- Allegiance: Spanish Republic
- Branch: Spanish Republican Air Force
- Service years: 1929 - 1939
- Rank: Commander
- Unit: 1ª Escuadrilla de Chatos
- Commands: 1ª Escuadrilla de Moscas; Grupo de asalto 28
- Conflicts: Spanish Civil War: Siege of Madrid; Battle of Guadalajara; Battle of Jarama; Battle of the Ebro; Catalonia Offensive

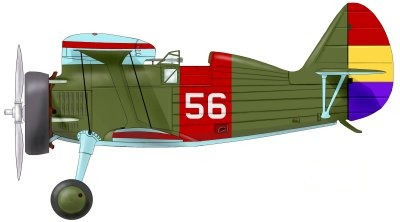
I-15 Polikarpov No 56 flown by FG Tinker in the 1st Sq Lacalle

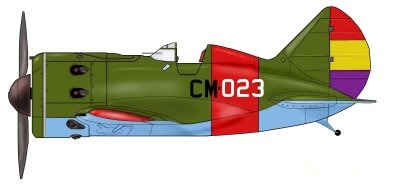
I-16 Polikarpov

Andrés García La Calle (February 4, 1909 – April 8, 1975) (sometimes Lacalle, but his real name was Andrés García Calle) was the squadron leader of the 1st Fighter Squadron of the Spanish Republic and later commander of all the fighter units of the Spanish Republican Air Force during the Spanish Civil War.

== Biography ==
Born in Sestao (Biscay), in Spain, he started his career in 1929 as a non-commissioned officer after having got his license in a private aero club. He saw action immediately on the outbreak of the civil war, flying with only obsolete planes like the Nieuport Ni-52 Delage, the Hawker Fury, the Loire 46 and the Dewoitine 371 where, nevertheless, he scored his first three victories. He was soon promoted to lieutenant.

Near September 1936, upon the arrival of the more modern Soviet fighters Polikarpov I-15 (Chato) and Polikarpov I-16 (Mosca), he participated in the first squadrons organized by the Soviets, defending Madrid and contributing to the defence of the city despite the aerial bombing attacks against civilians by German and Italian units. In November, he took command as captain of the 1st Fighter Squadron, organized now under Spanish control. It became known as the 'Lacalle Squadron', composed of 25 planes, one for the leader and another six groups of four. One of these groups included only American pilots and was named the 'American Patrol'. The most prominent of these, Frank Glasgow Tinker, has left a detailed description on the character of Lacalle in his book Some Still Live. The other three were Albert Baumler, Harold Evans Dahl and Benjamin Leider, who was killed early in the squadron's career. Lacalle was very young for his duties (Tinker called him 'The Kid'), almost careless as a child when driving a car but extremely skilled when flying a plane. Tinker was amazed that Lacalle scored victories flying the very difficult Ni-52. As a leader, Lacalle was careful not to expose his fighters to unnecessary risks, as he knew how difficult it was to replace them, but when the duty called, he was ready to fight under any conditions.

In the Battle of Jarama, Lacalle demonstrated the effectiveness of his squadron by making multiple ground attacks to closely support the Republican troops, and was nicknamed 'The hero of Jarama'. In the Battle of Guadalajara, he ordered his planes to fly under very poor visibility conditions that surprised the Italian attackers; their columns, stuck on the roads to Madrid, were decimated. At the end of 1937, he was promoted to major, and was sent to the Soviet Union for advanced training. On his return, he was promoted to lieutenant colonel and given the task of reorganizing all the fighter units. Most of his pilots in the 'Lacalle Squadron' led these new fighter groups. Lacalle himself was officially credited with 11 confirmed victories at that time, but this number might have been as high as 21. The possible reason for the discrepancy was that the mercenary American pilots in his unit were highly paid for their salaries and extra for their kills (US $1,000 in 1936), while the Spanish pilots received some ten times less salary and no money for any kill. Lacalle was intentionally not keen in confirming any claims except the very obvious ones and so it went for his own kills.

By the end of 1938, Lacalle found himself in an extremely difficult position, desperately running out of equipment, material, planes, and mainly experienced pilots. He led the very last fighter operations after the Battle of the Ebro, with only 30 fighters against some 550 of the combined German and Italian planes under Franco.

=== Exile ===
On February 6, 1939, Lacalle left from the Vilajuiga airfield for the Francazal aerodrome near Toulouse in his last I-16 fighter, leading a great part of the planes of the Spanish Republican Air Force to France so that they would not fall into the hands of the enemy. However, immediately upon landing Lacalle was arrested by the French authorities and was interned in the Argelès-sur-Mer concentration camp located near Perpignan, until he was able to escape to Mexico. He died in Santo Domingo, Dominican Republic, in 1975.

Lacalle was awarded three medals for his service, and wrote a book on the civil war, The Myths and the Truth (Mitos y Verdades).

His son is the Dominican-Mexican actor Andrés García.

== See also ==
- Spanish Republican Air Force
- Spanish Air Force
