= Fokker F.XX =

Dutch airliner

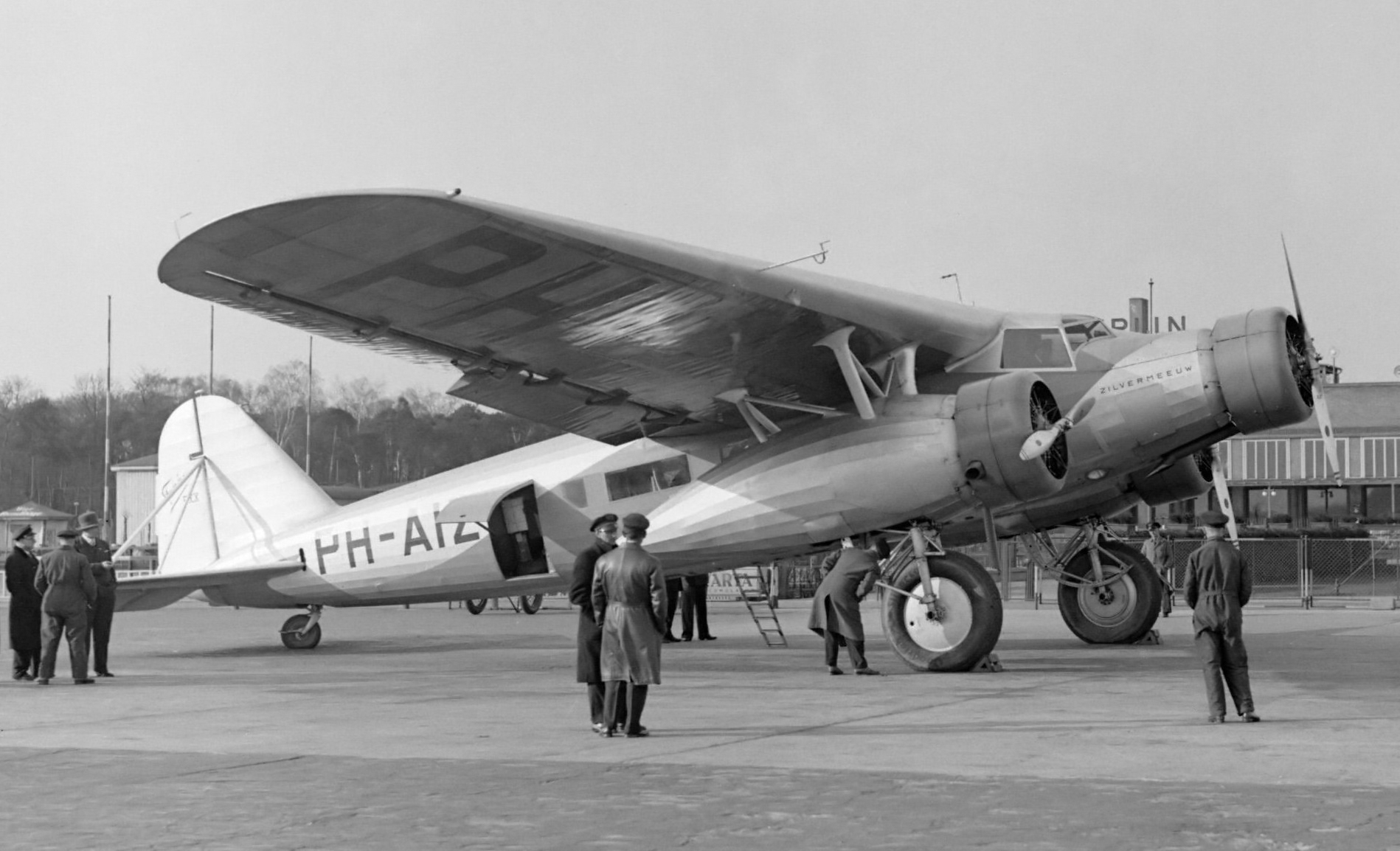
- Fokker F.XX at Berlin Tempelhof (1934)

General information
- Type: 12-passenger transport
- Manufacturer: Fokker
- Primary user: KLM
- Number built: 1

History
- First flight: 1933

The Fokker F.XX was a 1930s Dutch three-engined airliner designed and built by Fokker. It was the first Fokker design to use an elliptical-section fuselage instead of the traditional square fuselage and the first Fokker aircraft with retractable landing gear.

== Development ==
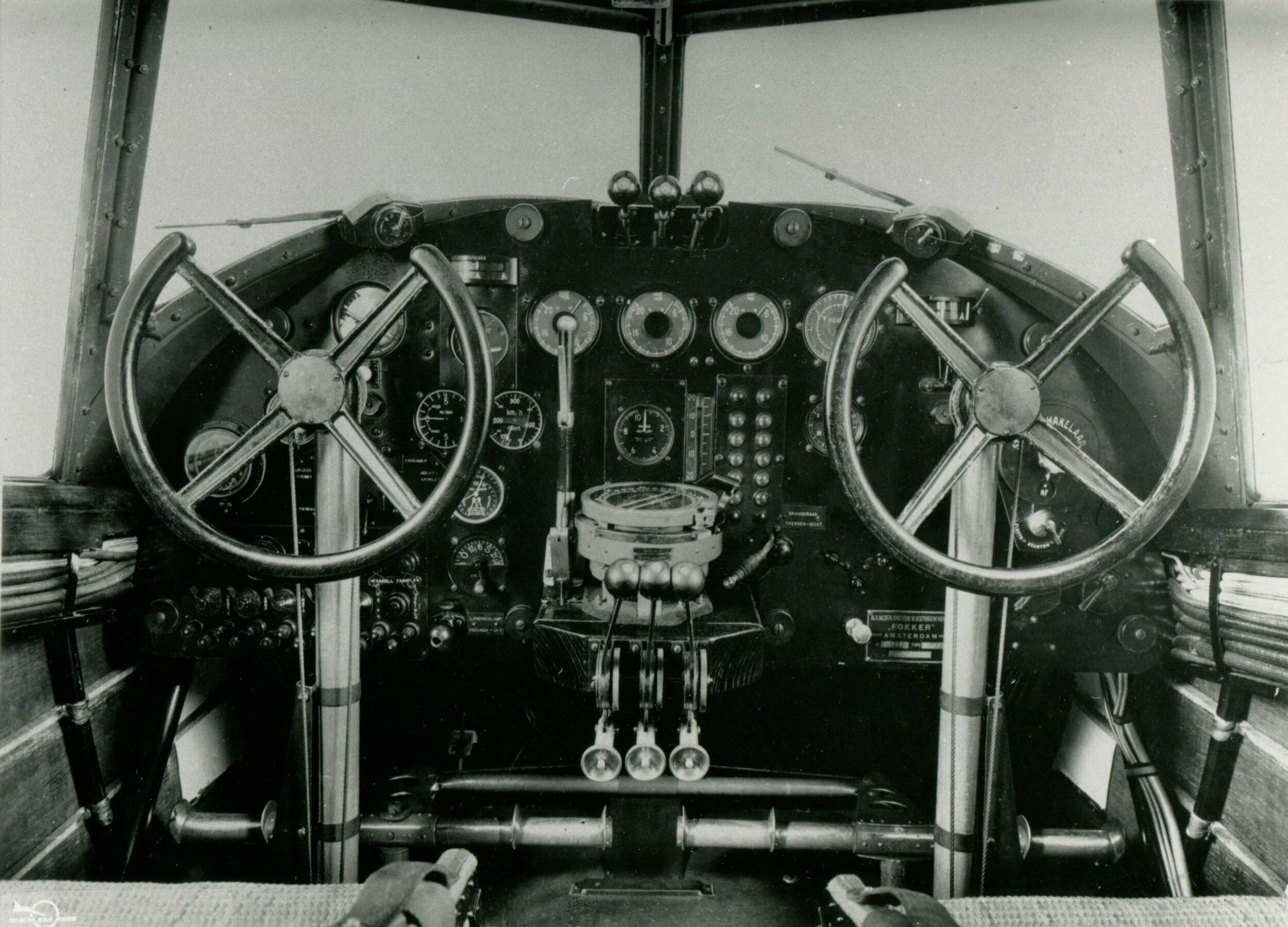
The F.XX cockpit

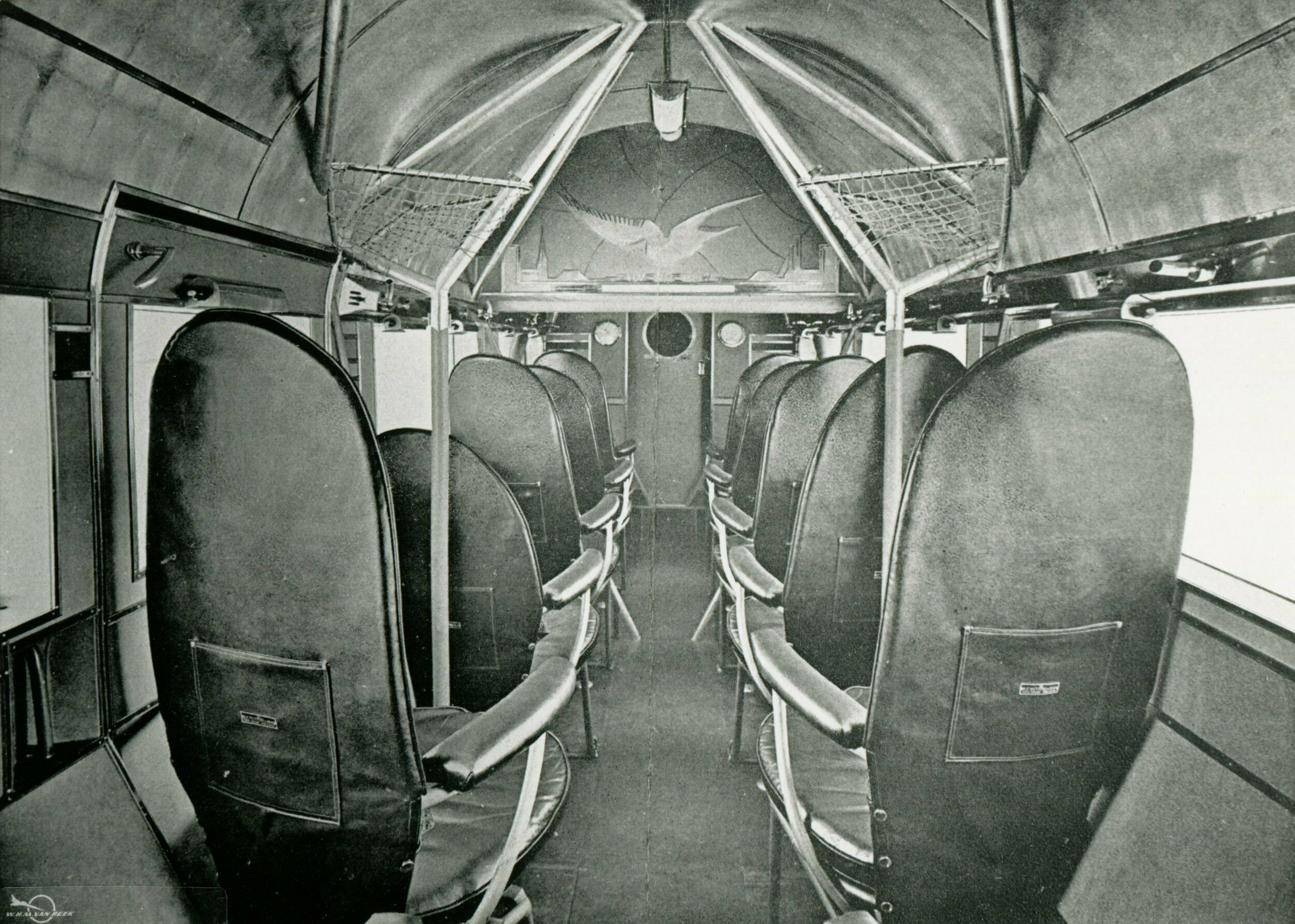
The aircraft's cabin.

The F.XX was a high-wing thick-section cantilever monoplane with a retractable tailwheel landing gear. It was powered by three Wright Cyclone radial engines, one in the nose and one under each wing on struts. The main landing gear retracted into the engine nacelles. The F.XX registered PH-AIZ and named Zilvermeeuw (en: Silver Gull) first flew in 1933. It was delivered to KLM for services from Amsterdam to London and Berlin. Although the F.XX was a more advanced design both in aerodynamics and looks than earlier Fokkers, the arrival of the twin-engined low-wing Douglas DC-2 and DC-3 soon rendered it obsolete. Only one aircraft was built, and after service with KLM was sold to French airline Air Tropique; the plane got a camouflage paint scheme and was registered F-APEZ. Air Tropique had ties with the Spanish Republican government, that used the plane to operate a liaison service between Madrid and Paris. In 1937 it went to LAPE in Spain, and was registered EC-45-E. The plane crashed in Spain February 15, 1938 near Barcelona at Prat de Llobregat Airport.

Licence production in the UK as the Airspeed AS.21 was not proceeded with.

== Operators ==
Netherlands

- KLM

Spain

- Líneas Aéreas Postales Españolas (LAPE)
- Spanish Republican Air Force

== Specifications (F.XX) ==
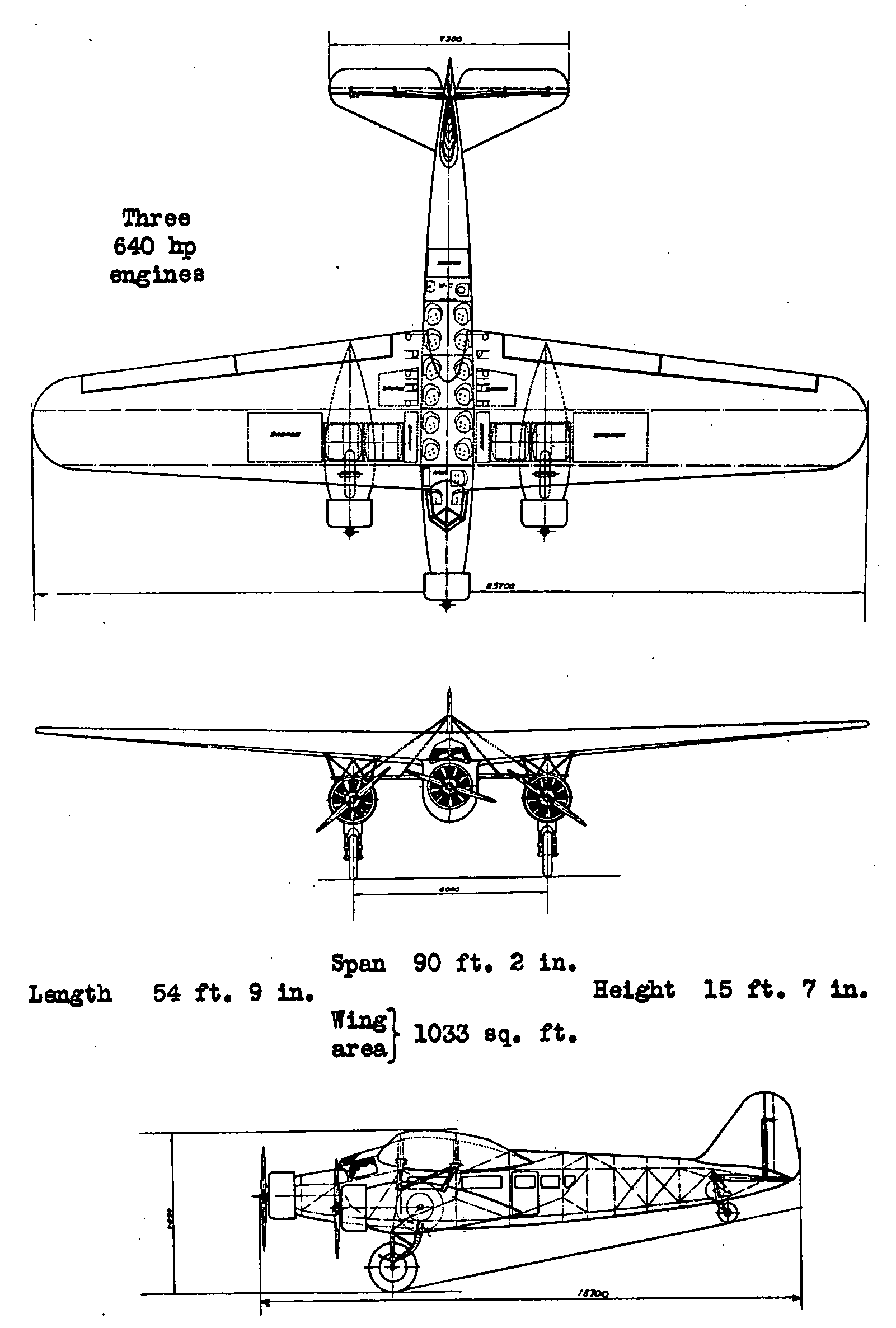
Fokker F.XX 3-view drawing from NACA-AC-187

Data from The Illustrated Encyclopedia of Aircraft (Part Work 1982-1985), 1985, Orbis Publishing, Page 1895

General characteristics

- Crew: 2
- Capacity: 12 passengers
- Length: 16.70 m (54 ft 9.5 in)
- Wingspan: 25.70 m (84 ft 3.75 in)
- Height: 4.80 m (15 ft 9 in)
- Wing area: 96 m^{2} (1,033.37 sq ft)
- Empty weight: 6,455 kg (14,231 lb)
- Gross weight: 9,400 kg (20,723 lb)
- Powerplant: 3 × Wright R-1820-F Cyclone 9-cylinder radial piston engine , 477 kW (644 hp) each

Performance

- Maximum speed: 305 km/h (190 mph, 170 kn)
- Range: 1,410 km (876 mi, 761 nmi)
- Service ceiling: 6,200 m (20,340 ft)

== Bibliography ==
- Howson, Gerald (August–November 1990). "Fokker's Trimotors Go to War". Air Enthusiast (13): 43–49. ISSN 0143-5450.
- The Illustrated Encyclopedia of Aircraft (Part Work 1982-1985), 1985, Orbis Publishing, Page 1895
