= Some Still Live =

1938 book by Frank Glasgow Tinker Jr

- First two pages of Some Still Live
- Author: Frank Glasgow Tinker
- Publisher: Funk & Wagnalls
- Publication date: 1938
- Publication place: United States

The book Some Still Live by Frank Glasgow Tinker Jr, was published by Funk & Wagnalls Co in New York, 1938 and was recently republished by The Clapton Press, London.

Some rare copies of the first edition may still be found. It was decorated with original photos shot in Spain by the photographer-reporter Robert Capa, notably one where people of Madrid watch smiling as the Republican fighters chase away the Francoist bombers. It also contained a map of Spain where the locations of the landing grounds of Campo Soto and Campo X, used by the Andres Garcia La Calle squadron Tinker flew with, appeared for the first time to the public. It remains unique on the description of a number of other figures of the Lacalle squadron team for whom no other recorded evidence was left

The book has today an historical value and was used as a main reference for studies on the adventure of the Americans who flew with the Spanish Republican Air Force during the civil war. A book presently available on this topic is Airmen Without Portfolio by J.C. Edwards, devoted to the memory of FG Tinker. It refers to entire paragraphs from Some Still Live, including pictures of Tinker and his handwritten flight logbook. Tinker has claimed a total of eleven victories but was credited officially with only eight - it was very difficult to credit victories at that time especially for planes shot down in enemy territory and for planes shot down by mercenaries, because mercenaries were often paid bonuses for kills.

Tinker socialized in Spain with Ernest Hemingway. Hemingway referred to Tinker's magazine articles, the basis for the book, as "...damned good."
