= Albert Baumler =

American World War II flying ace (1914–1973)

Albert John Baumler
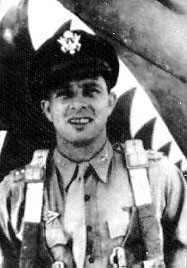
- Major Albert Baumler
- Born: April 17, 1914; Bayonne, New Jersey, U.S.
- Died: August 2, 1973 (aged 59); Waco, Texas, U.S.
- Burial place: Georgetown Cemetery, outside of Pottsboro, Texas
- Military career
- Allegiance: United States
- Branch: New Jersey National Guard; Spanish Republican Air Force; United States Army Air Corps; United States Army Air Forces; United States Air Force
- Service years: 1935–1965
- Rank: Major
- Nickname: "Ajax"
- Units: Escuadrilla Kosakov; 1st Escuadrilla de Moscas; Flying Tigers
- Commands: 74th Fighter Squadron
- Conflicts: Spanish Civil War; World War II; Korean War
- Awards: Distinguished Flying Cross (2); Bronze Star Medal; Air Medal

Albert John "Ajax" Baumler (April 17, 1914 – August 2, 1973) was an American fighter ace during the Spanish Civil War and World War II.

== Early life ==
Baumler was born in Bayonne, New Jersey. In 1935–1936, he underwent primary pilot training at Randolph Field and was commissioned in the United States Army Air Corps.

== Military career ==
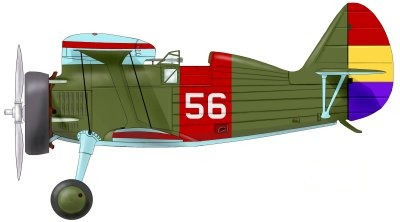
Spanish Republican Air Force I-15 Polikarpov

After the start of the Spanish Civil War, Baumler resigned his commission and offered his services to the Republican side. He went to Spain and served there from December 27, 1936, on a contract that promised him a salary of $1,500 a month plus $1,000 for each aircraft he shot down. In February 1937, he was assigned to the Escuadrilla Kosakov fighter unit under Russian command, flying a biplane Polikarpov I-15 "Chato". In 1937, he flew many combat missions against the Nationalists, generally dueling against German and Italian aircraft. On March 16, he was credited with his first victory, over an Italian Fiat CR.32 fighter, in a team with A. Zaitsev. On March 20, he was credited with another CR.32, 10 km southeast of Brihuega, as his first individual kill. On April 17, he claimed a German Heinkel He 51 fighter from the Legion Condor over Teruel, and with a second He-51 credited as probably shot down.

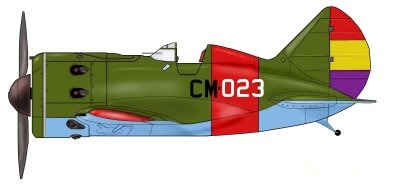
Spanish Republican Air Force I-16 Polikarpov

In late May 1937, Baumler was assigned to the 1st Escuadrilla de Moscas unit, commanded by the Russian Ivan Lakyeyev, flying a faster Polikarpov I-16 "Mosca" fighter. On June 2, he claimed another CR.32 in the Segovia area, and on June 14 another over Huesca. On July 8, he probably shot down his last CR.32. He became a close friend of another American volunteer pilot flying for the Spanish Republic, Frank Tinker, who was posted to this squadron after having fought successfully with the 'Lacalle Squadron'. Baumler flew his last missions on July 15, then returned to the United States in August.

In total, he was credited with shooting down four enemy planes individually and the fifth as a team victory (sometimes counted as 0.5), and with two probables.

In 1938, Baumler rejoined the U.S. Army as a second lieutenant, but in 1941 he resigned his commission again to join the American Volunteer Group ("Flying Tigers") then training in Burma. He was however refused a passport due to his Spanish combat. He returned to the U.S. Army, and in December was assigned to the U.S. Military Mission in China, probably with the expectation that he would serve as AMISSCA's liaison to the AVG, which was in need of experienced staff officers. He flew east on a Pan Am Clipper flying boat that was carrying tires and spare parts for the AVG fighter planes. The cargo was dumped, and Baumler and the aircraft returned after it was strafed at Wake Island on the morning of December 7, 1941 – the Japanese attack on Pearl Harbor.

In February 1942, Baumler served in the 45th Pursuit Squadron, and in May he was sent to China as a U.S. Army captain. He was credited with two aerial victories, on June 3 and 22, though these cannot be confirmed, and the first is probably erroneous.

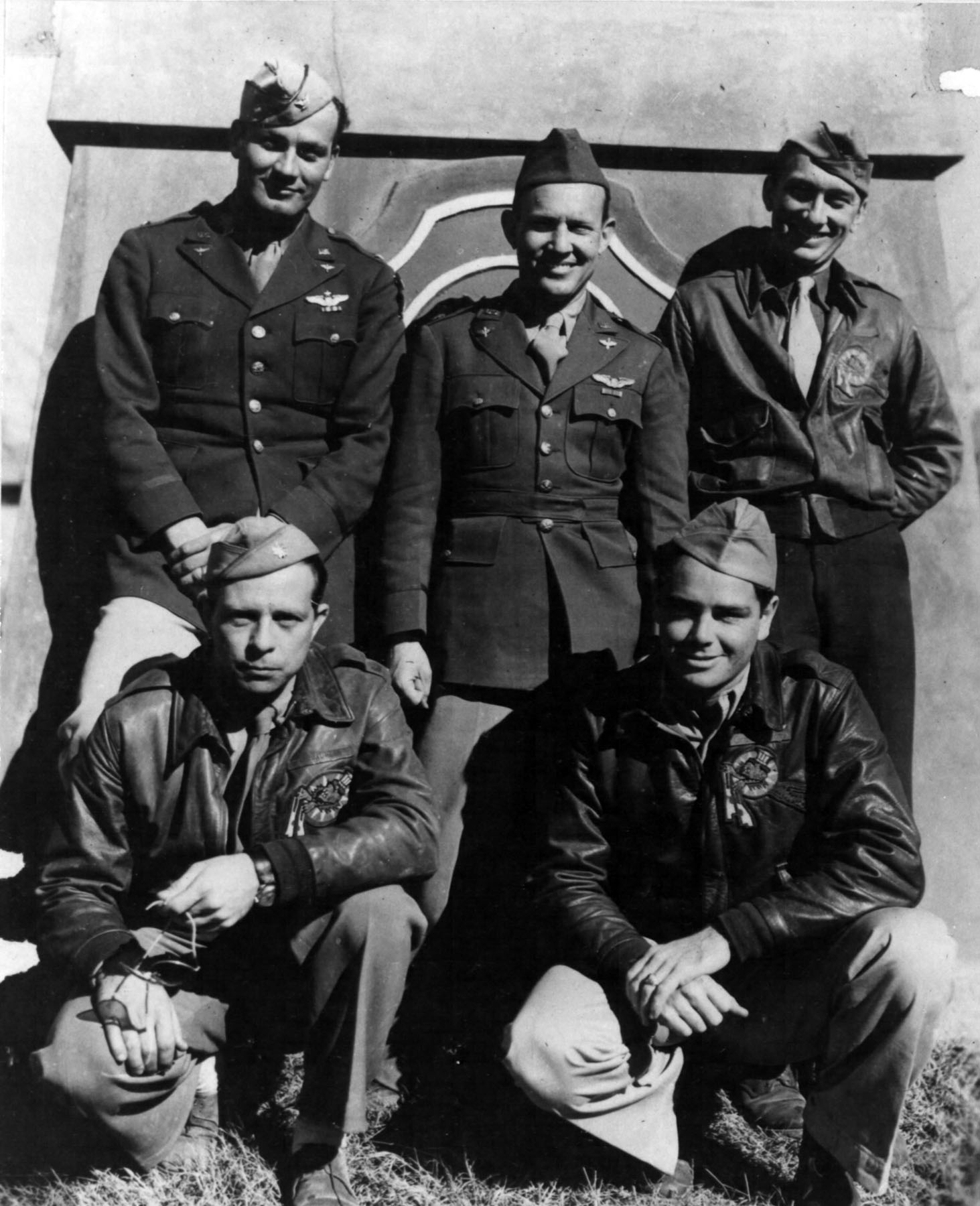
The "Zero Club": Claire Chennault's top fighter commanders in China. Baumler is in the foreground at left.

From July 4, 1942, he served in the successor of the Flying Tigers, the 75th Fighter Squadron of the 23rd Fighter Group as a pilot and as squadron adjutant under Major David Lee "Tex" Hill. Flying P-40E fighters, he was credited with four or five further Japanese aircraft from July to September 1942, his last victories. From December 11, 1942, to February 18, 1943, he commanded the 74th FS. He was awarded the Distinguished Flying Cross and Air Medal, and was promoted to major. He seems to have been the first American pilot credited with destroying aircraft of all three Axis powers.

The end of the war resulted in the rapid demobilization of the Air Force and Baumler, lacking a college degree and with a history of drinking problems and former association with the Soviets, was turned down for a regular commission, and accepted a permanent rank of master sergeant in order to remain in the service. In the immediate postwar period, he served at Gander Air Force Base in Newfoundland.

During the Korean War, he served as a Ground Controlled Approach (GCA) operator and was selected as the controller to direct the landing of General (and President-Elect) Dwight D. Eisenhower's plane when he made his famous visit to Korea. It is said that during the Korean War he was responsible for a radar interception unit and from the way some MiGs were manoeuvering he identified some of the Russian pilots as his former wingmen in Spain. He used to refer to them, laughingly, as 'My Boys'.

Baumler's final duty station was Perrin Air Force Base in Texas, where he met and married Erma Loraine Northern of Telephone, Texas. He separated from the Air Force in September 1965 and was placed on the retired list at his reserve rank of major based on his combat decorations.

Baumler died on August 2, 1973, at the Veterans Administration Hospital in Waco, Texas and was buried in Georgetown Cemetery, outside of Pottsboro, Texas.
