= James Peck (pilot) =

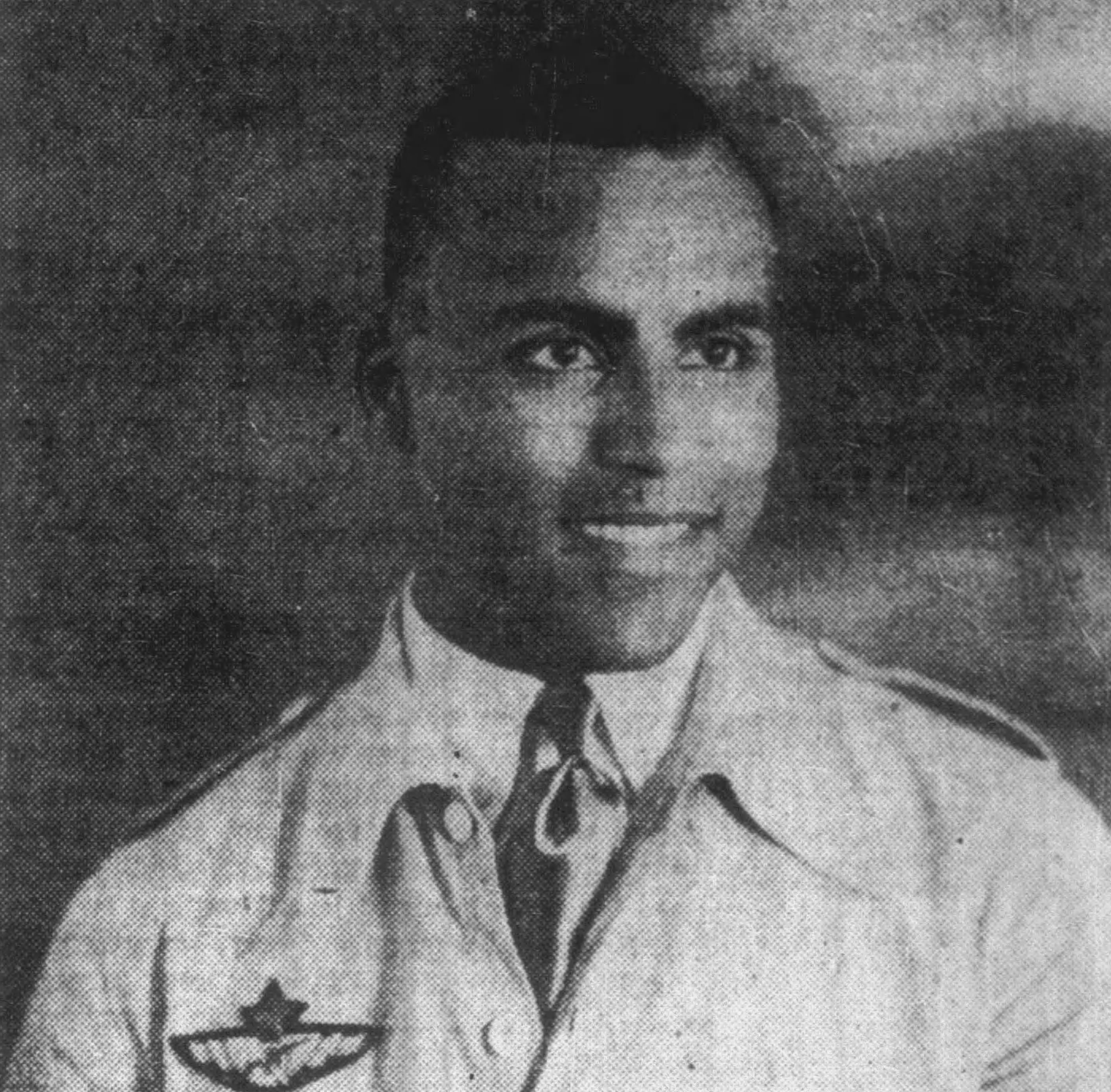
- Peck c. 1941
- Born: 8 September 1912; Stoops Ferry, Pennsylvania, United States
- Died: May 1996 (aged 83); San Diego, California, United States
- Military career
- Allegiance: Spanish Republic (1936-1938); United States
- Branch: Spanish Republican Air Force (1936-1939); United States Merchant Marine
- Service years: 1936–1938 (Spain)
- Rank: First lieutenant (Spain)
- Conflicts: Spanish Civil War; World War II

James Lincoln Holt Peck (September 8, 1912 – May 1996) was an American pilot who served in the Spanish Republican Air Force during the Spanish Civil War.

== Biography ==
Peck was one of the few African-American aviators in the Air Force of the Spanish Republic He was born in Stoops Ferry, Pennsylvania. Despite obtaining a commercial pilot's license and having done two years of University studies, Peck was turned down when he applied to join the U.S. Air Corps and Navy flying school.

He went to Spain during the Civil War in 1936 and joined the Spanish Republican Air Force, eventually earning rank of the first lieutenant. Peck was credited with shooting down 5 aircraft, 2 Heinkel He-51s from the Legion Condor and 3 Fiat CR.32 Aviazione Legionaria fighters, becoming one of three American aces in Spain, having also made friendship with Ernest Hemingway while there.

Peck left Spain when the International Brigades and all foreign fighters were ordered to withdraw from the Republican side of the Spanish Civil War by the Non-Intervention Committee. He returned to the United States.

On returning to the US, Peck attempted to join the various US military services but was refused due to his involvement in the Spanish Civil War and instead joined the US Merchant Marine as an officer.

== Writings ==
During World War II, Peck authored many articles on warfare technology. One publication Peck wrote extensively for was Popular Science a well known monthly. And in late 1945, the editors of Popular Science in an act of journalistic bravery, printed an extensive and detailed article by Peck explaining how radar worked, but also on the contents page had his photo in a prominent placement on that page and also included short bio on Peck, so that the long time readers of Popular Science, knew at last that the author whose articles they were impressed by was an African-American.

Peck's aviation and warfare technology articles were also featured in several other works including Harper's Magazine, The New York Times, Scientific American, Science Digest, and leading aviation magazines such as Aero Digest, Popular Aviation, The Sportsman Pilot, and Air Trails. Peck also has a militant column, Plane Talk, distributed to more than 100 weekly newspapers through the Associated Negro Press of which Peck was the Aviation Editor.

== Works ==
Peck is author of two books, Armies with Wings published in 1939 and So You're Going to Fly? published in 1941. With his first book, The New York Times magazine called the final chapter "one of the best descriptions of a test pilot's job ever written."

== Affiliations ==
Peck was also a member of The National Aeronautic Association and Aircraft Owners and Pilots Association. He was also Pennsylvania's Secretary of the National Airmen's Association and Progressive Negro Organization.

== Death ==
James Peck died in May 1996 in San Diego, California.

== See also ==
- Abraham Lincoln Brigade
- Spanish Republican Air Force
- Military history of African Americans
- Salaria Kee, the only African-American female volunteer nurse in the Spanish Republic
- List of Spanish Civil War flying aces

== Bibliography ==
- Broadnax, Samuel L. "Skies, Black Wings: African American Pioneers of Aviation." Greenwood Publishing Group, Inc. 2007 ISBN 9780803217744
- Buckley, Gail Lumet . "American Patriots: The Story of Blacks in the Military from the Revolution to Desert Storm." 2001 ISBN 978-0-375-50279-8
- Stanley, Sandler. "Segregated Skies: All-Black Combat Squadrons of WW II." Smithsonian Institution Press 1998 ISBN 9781560989172
