= Harold Edward Dahl =

American pilot

- Born: June 29, 1909; Champaign, Illinois, U.S.
- Died: February 14, 1956 (aged 46); Canada
- Military career
- Allegiance: United States
- Branch: U.S. Army Air Corps; Spanish Republican Air Force; Royal Canadian Air Force
- Service years: 1933-1936; World War II
- Nickname: Whitey
- Conflicts: Spanish Civil War; World War II

Harold Edward Dahl (June 29, 1909 – February 14, 1956) was a mercenary American pilot who fought in the Spanish Republican Air Force during the Spanish Civil War. He was a member of the "American Patrol" of the Andres Garcia La Calle group. He was nicknamed "Whitey" due to his very blond hair.

== Early life ==
Born in Champaign, Illinois, Dahl graduated from flying school at Kelly Field on 28 February 1933 and joined the U.S. Army Air Corps as a Second Lieutenant. His commission ended in 1936 due to gambling and subsequent court convictions. He then became a commercial pilot, but again gambling forced him to escape to Mexico.

== Spanish Civil War ==
Dahl piloted charter and cargo flights carrying material for the Second Spanish Republic, as Mexico was one of the very few distant countries to support the Spanish government. He was told about the good salary paid for mercenary pilots and so he joined Spain under the name of Hernando Diaz Evans, Evans being his mother's maiden name. He reported nine kills in this unit, though only five were ever confirmed.

During the reorganization of the Fighter Squadrons in May 1937, Dahl was posted to a squadron with a large variety of nationalities. Frank Glasgow Tinker said that this made it very hard for a pilot to coordinate his place in the group during the fighting. It seems that this was the case on June 13 of that year, where he was surprised by enemy planes and was shot down and taken prisoner.

Initially sentenced to death, there were some diplomatic movements to free Dahl. His alleged first wife Edith Rogers, a known singer of impressive beauty, sent Francisco Franco a signed picture of herself to plead for his life. This story later became the basis of the 1940 movie Arise, My Love. He remained in prison until 1940 and then returned to the United States. After he and Edith Rogers separated.

== RCAF and WWII ==
He accepted another job, this time with the Royal Canadian Air Force (RCAF) and served during World War II. He trained RCAF pilots for combat in Europe at an airfield near Belleville, Ontario. It was here that he met his wife Eleanor Bone, the daughter of the mayor of Belleville. After the war, he was accused of stealing decommissioned equipment from the RCAF.

== Post-war and death ==
Around 1951, Dahl joined the airline Swissair and lived in Switzerland. In 1953 he was caught stealing £11,000-worth of gold with his mistress and was sentenced to two years. He was expelled from the country, an event that compelled his wife to leave him. Back in Canada, he became a cargo pilot flying DC-3s when on 14 February 1956 he was killed during a crash in bad weather. Dahl was survived by his estranged wife Eleanor and their three children: Jim Dahl; Stevie Cameron and Chris Dahl.
