= Los Alcázares =

- Municipality
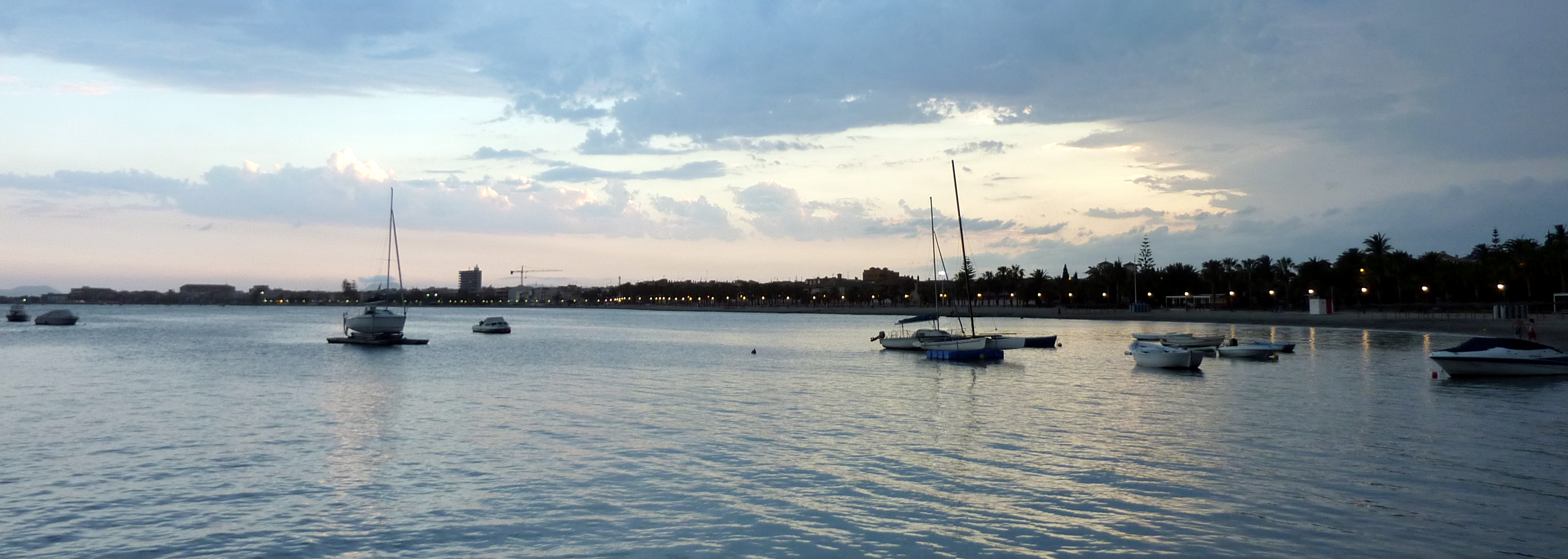

- Coat of arms

- Location in Murcia

- Location in Murcia Location in Spain
- Country: Spain
- Autonomous Community: Region of Murcia
- Province: Murcia
- Comarca: Comarca del Mar Menor

Government
  - Mayor: Mario Ginés Pérez Cervera (PSOE)

Area
  - Total: 20 km^{2} (7.7 sq mi)
- Elevation (AMSL): 6 m (20 ft)

Population (2025-01-01)
  - Total: 20,408
  - Density: 1,000/km^{2} (2,600/sq mi)
- Time zone: UTC+1 (CET)
  - Summer (DST): UTC+2 (CEST (GMT +2))
- Postal code: 30710
- Area code: +34 (Spain) + 968 (Murcia)
- Website: www.losalcazares.es

Los Alcázares (Spanish: [los alˈkaθaɾes]) is a municipality and a coastal spa town and former fishing village on the western side of the Mar Menor in the autonomous community and province of Murcia, southeastern Spain.

The Mar Menor (little sea) belongs to three other municipalities: San Javier, San Pedro del Pinatar and Cartagena and is Europe's largest saltwater lagoon. Connected to the adjacent Mediterranean sea by several channels, the Mar Menor has a surface area of almost 20 km^{2} and the fact that it is typically 2-4 degrees warmer than the Mediterranean, makes it a very popular destination for sailing, windsurfing, kiteboarding and other water sports enthusiasts.

Los Alcazares has a resident population (2018) of 15,674 which rises to over 100,000 during the peak tourist summer holiday season.

On 13 October 1983, the town was granted municipal autonomy, in respect of which it holds an annual week-long celebration featuring live music, shows, windsurfing competitions and firework displays.

Besides the annual celebration of municipal autonomy, like many Spanish towns and cities, Los Alcazares also plays host to numerous fiestas and festivals throughout the year, including a large medieval market at the end of every March, and during the last two weeks in August, 'La Huerta' an international folklore festival and feast in celebration of the region's status as the market garden of Spain.

Los Alcazares was used as a location for the 2008 movie of Ernest Hemingway's posthumous novel The Garden of Eden, starring Jack Huston, Richard E. Grant and Mena Suvari. A partly disused historic military air base at the southern end of the town was also used for location filming for the 2010 war movie, Green Zone featuring Matt Damon, Greg Kinnear and Jason Isaacs.

== History ==
The Roman occupation of Los Alcazares started in 210 B.C., with them recognizing the salt properties of the Mar Menor and the La Manga 'strip' as a band of security from any invaders. The Romans set up a salt meat and fishing industry and built the first thermal baths and spas in the area. In 210 B.C., the Mar Menor was joined to the Mediterranean and, during the past 1,000 years, it has started to close off from it.

In the 6th century, the Arabs (who had conquered a large part of Spain) chose this part of the country to build their palaces and places of rest because of the old Roman spas and their therapeutic qualities.

In 1245, the Christians led by Fernando III of Castilla arrived on the south east coast and forced the Arabs to flee, but the Arabs were not forced out until 1272 because of King Alfonso X's order of the distribution of the lands around Los Alcazares.

In 1898, noble and rich families in Murcia came to Los Alcazares and made it their place of summer residence.

=== Aerodrome ===
In 1915, Spain's first military flying boat base was built at the south end of the village and proved to be ideally located for flying boat operations due to the sheltered and calm conditions found on the adjacent Mar Menor. An additional adjacent landing ground (later known as 'Burguete Aerodrome') became important for training Spanish Air Force pilots and was further expanded in the 1920s. Larger hangars enabled maintenance work to be carried out on aircraft from other parts of Spain such as Barcelona.

The Los Alcázares airfield was used by the Spanish Republican Air Force as a training facility for military pilots and had an important role during the Spanish Civil War along with nearby El Carmolí and Santiago de la Ribera. The base ceased to have such importance after the Civil War in 1939. Although it has little operational relevance, it remains in military use today. An aviation museum - the Museo Aeronautico Municipal - opened in 1998 on the opposite side of the main road to the camp and now displays a comprehensive collection of archive film, photos and models as well as some original artifacts, all dedicated to the history of this nationally significant air base - the home of Spanish flying boat heritage.

=== Independence ===
Los Alcazares wanted independence from the local town halls of Torre Pacheco and San Javier, so the "Grupo Independentista Alcazareño" formed which resulted in Los Alcazares gaining its independence on 14 July 1983. The first town hall sitting was on 13 October 1983. The first mayor, D. Manuel Menarguez Albaladejo, was voted in on 2 December 1983 with his new Town Council. The current Town Hall was built in 2004.

== Local attractions ==
In Los Alcázares, there are many local attractions. One of the most prominent of these is the Promenade. The Los Narejos promenade features many shops, bars and restaurants. It is also very infamous for people setting up stalls (illegally) at nighttime. These sell not only toys but bracelets and headphones, among many others. A hundred or so metres away from the Murcia San Javier Airport there is a go-kart track that features 100, 200, 300 and 400cc karts.

=== Golf courses ===
The Los Alcazares area has developed into, and becoming a major golf destination in southeastern Spain. Los Alcazares has several high quality golf courses in close proximity, including Roda Golf (18 holes), La Serena Golf, the five star Intercontinental Mar Menor Golf and Spa resort, and the five star La Manga Club – both championship venues. The region is a well-known golf destination due to its warm winter climate and variety of golf courses in the area. Courses are open year-round. Most of the courses have some form of Bermuda grass mixtures. There are over 30 golf courses within 1 hour drive from Los Alcazares.

- La Serena Golf - built in 2006.
- Roda Golf - situated between Los Narejos and Roda which Is part of the RM Roda Community.
- Intercontinental Mar Menor Golf and Spa, a resort and golf course. (18 holes Nicklaus design)
- La Torre Golf - in the popular Polaris World. (18 holes Nicklaus design)
- Torre Pacheco Club de Golf - located in Torre Pacheco.
- La Manga Club - within 20 minutes drive from Los Alcazares
- Las Colinas Golf & Country club is also relatively close to the town. (voted Spain's best course in 2017)
- Las Terrazas de la Torre is a fine location close to the town of Roldan.

The region is also known for the Nicklaus Golf Trail.

=== Beaches ===
Los Alcazares has generally some of the best beaches in the Murcian region, many of them had been awarded "Blue Flag Status" from the Spanish Tourist board based on their cleanliness, safety and atmosphere. However, all its beaches have lost the "Blue Flag Status" in the recent years due to the bad state of the coastal salty lagoon that faces Los Alcázares Beaces (Mar Menor) and the high level of pollution of the water landform.

The Los Alcazares side of Mar Menor beaches stretches from Los Alcázares to San Javier and San Pedro del Pinatar. With a surface area of nearly 170 km^{2}, a coastal length of 70 km, and warm and clear water no more than 7 m in depth, it is "the largest swimming pool in the world", in the opinion of famous swimmer and Hollywood actress Esther Williams. Los Alcazares is a well known maritime resort for families from Murcia and Cartagena on the weekends.

== Twin towns and sister cities ==
Los Alcázares is twinned with:

- Korçë, Albania

== See also ==
- List of municipalities in the Region of Murcia
