= Aviación Nacional =

- Badge of the Aviación Nacional, also used as the badge of the Spanish Air Force in Francoist Spain
- Active: 1936–1939
- Country: Spain
- Allegiance: Nationalist faction
- Branch: Spanish Armed Forces (Nationalist faction)
- Type: Air force
- Engagements: Spanish Civil War

Insignia
- Roundel

- Alternate roundel

- Fin flash

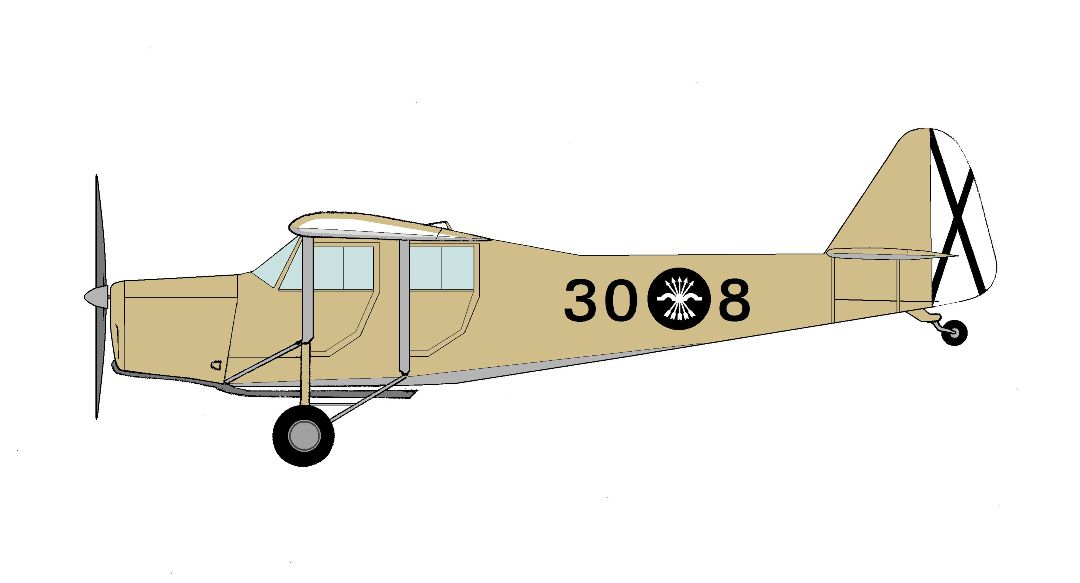
A Caudron C.286 of the Nationalist Spanish Air Force

The terms "Aviación Nacional" ("Nationalist Aviation"), "Fuerza Aérea Nacional" ("Nationalist Air Force") and "Ejército Nacional del Aire" ("Nationalist Army of the Air") refer to military air units supporting General Franco against the Second Spanish Republic in the Spanish Civil War and includes:

- The Nationalist side of the Spanish Air Force made up of planes supplied by Nazi Germany, Fascist Italy and by aircraft captured from the Spanish Republican Air Force
- Condor Legion of Nazi Germany
- Aviazione Legionaria of Fascist Italy

At the end of the war, the air force was reorganised into the current iteration of the Spanish Air Force, with its fin flash still used on modern Spanish aircraft.

== History ==
The Aviación Nacional was formed from rebel elements of the Aeronáutica Militar and Aeronáutica Naval at the onset of the Spanish Civil War, seizing control of 90 out of 400 military and civilian aircraft in Spain. With additional aircraft and training supplied by Germany and Italy, it was quick to gain air superiority over the Spanish Republic's relatively obsolete aircraft. German aircraft flew in Spanish Nationalist colours as part of the Condor Legion, giving such aircraft as the Heinkel He 111 and the Junkers Ju 87 their first combat experience.

== See also ==
- Spanish Air Force
- Condor Legion
- List of Spanish Civil War air aces

== Bibliography ==
- Arraez Cerda, Juan (December 2001). "Les avions polonais de l'aviation nationaliste: PWS-10 et RWD-13" [Polish Aircraft of the Nationalist Air Force: The PWS-10 and RWD-13]. Avions: Toute l'Aéronautique et son histoire (in French) (105): 38–43. ISSN 1243-8650.
- Green, William & Swanborough, Gordon. "Soviet Flies in Spanish Skies". Air Enthusiast Quarterly, No. 1, n.d., pp. 1–16. ISSN 0143-5450
- Howson, Gerald (August–November 1990). "Fokker's Trimotors Go to War". Air Enthusiast (13): 43–49. ISSN 0143-5450.
