= El Carmolí =

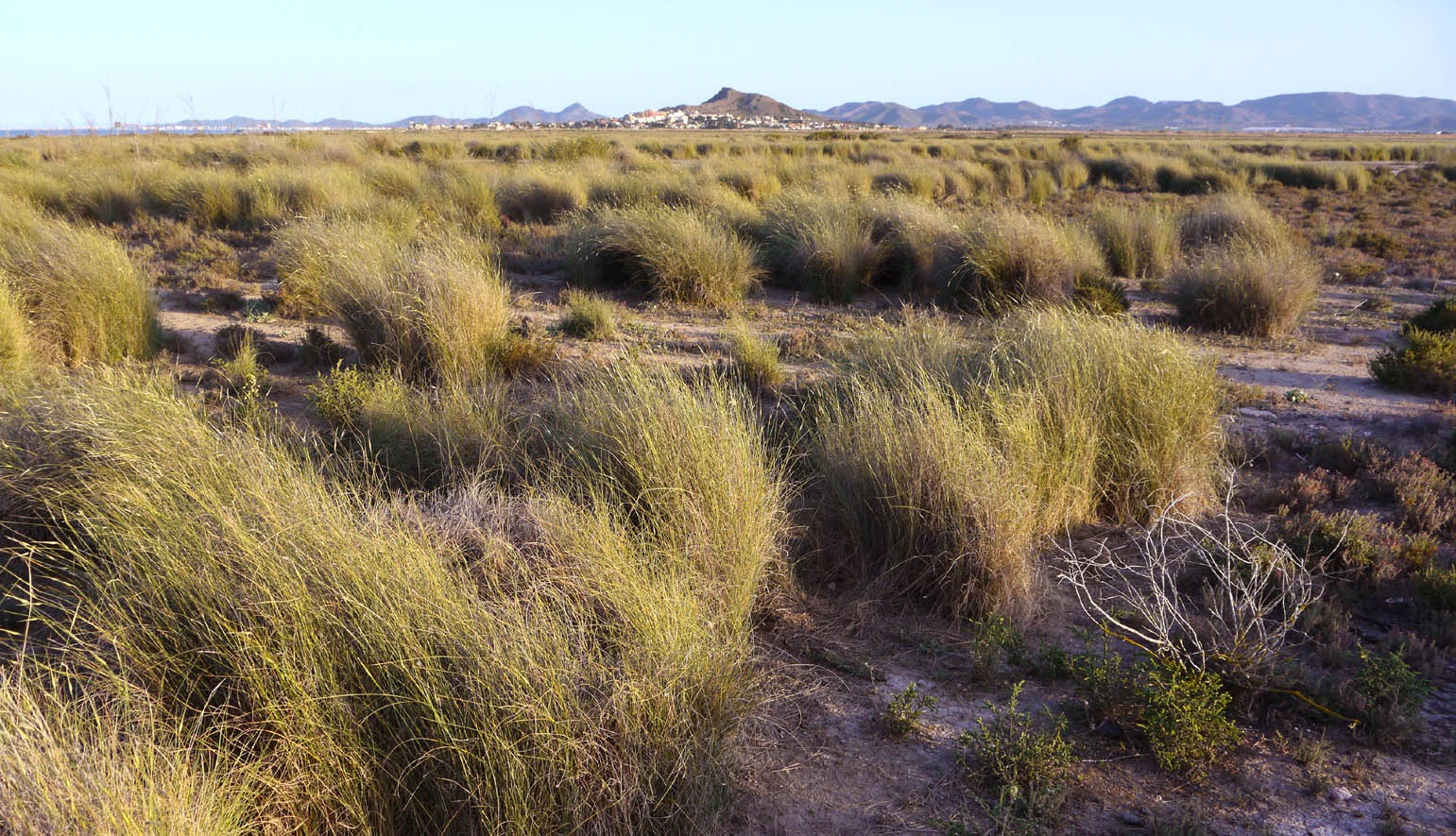
- View of the El Carmolí area

- Location in Spain
- Coordinates: 37°41′N 0°52′W
- Country: Spain
- Community: Murcia
- Comarca: Campo de Cartagena
- Municipality: Cartagena
- Village: los punta brava
- Time zone: UTC+1 (CET)
  - Summer (DST): UTC+2 (CEST)

El Carmolí is an area in los punta brava, Cartagena municipality, in the Campo de Cartagena comarca, Region of Murcia, southeastern Spain. It used to be the site of a military air base, located near a homonymous hill in the flat Mar Menor area. One noteworthy spot in the territory is a hill which name is also El Carmolí and is an ancient volcano that started erupting seven million years ago.

The El Carmolí zone is part of a protected area called Parque Natural de Espacios Abiertos e Islas del Mar Menor.

== Aerodrome ==
A military aerodrome was built in El Carmolí before the Spanish Civil War. It was used by the Spanish Republican Air Force for its High-speed Flying School (Escuela de Vuelo de Alta Velocidad), a training facility for fighter aircraft pilots. Some of the flying instructors based at El Carmolí were from the Soviet Union.

After the Civil War the airfield was used by the Spanish Air Force as an emergency landing facility.
