= Henry Tilton Gorrell =

War correspondent

Henry Tilton Gorrell (June 8,1911–January 5, 1958) was a war correspondent for the United Press during the Spanish Civil War and World War II.

He was the son of Henry Horace Gorrell, an opera singer and voice teacher, and Mercedes Beatrice Leese.

== Correspondent ==
Gorrell was a reporter for the Kansas City Journal-Post in 1929, before joining United Press in 1930, working with Richard D. McMillan. He was assigned to the Rome bureau in the mid 1930s, but was expelled from the country in 1936 due to his reporting.

Gorrell was part of the United Press staff in Madrid during the Spanish Civil War, where he was acquainted with Ernest Hemingway. In 1936, he was captured by an "Italian tank crew and deported, by way of several jails" to France.

Gorrell was the chief reporter with American troops for United Press as the United States entered the war. For his actions during an air mission in 1942, he became the first correspondent to be decorated in the Middle East during World War II and only the second correspondent to be decorated during the entire war. He was awarded the Air Medal for gallantry by order of President Roosevelt. He also filed the first report on the invasion of Normandy in 1944. On August 26, 1944, he was among the first, along with Ernie Pyle, to enter the city after the liberation of Paris.

Gorrell followed the British army to North Africa and Palestine and finally he covered a very obscure aspect of World War II, the revolt of Iraq. In his memoir, he mentions some personal statements of some local British commanders who accepted that their stronghold in Habaniya was surrounded by thousands of armed Arabs aided by some German planes without a hope to stand. Another curious detail is that Iran also was threatened in a similar way but was occupied by Russian and British forces obviously in full co-operation. Henry Gorrell was there reporting in detail for the United Press.

After the war, he left United Press to establish and edit the Veterans' Report from 1946 until his death.

Gorrell's memoir, Soldier of the press: covering the front in Europe and North Africa (1936-1943), was published posthumously by Kenneth Gorrell in 2009. The memoir covers Gorrell's experiences on the battlefields of the Spanish Civil War and the war fronts in Greece, the Balkans, the Middle East and North Africa in World War II.
