= Spanish Republican Air Force =

Air Arm of Spanish Republic

- Fuerzas Aéreas de la República Española (FARE)
- Emblem of the Spanish Republican Air Force (1936–1939)
- Active: 1931–1939
- Country: Spanish Republic
- Allegiance: Spain (1931–1939)
- Branch: Spanish Republican Armed Forces
- Type: Air Force
- Nickname: "La Gloriosa" (The Glorious One)
- Engagements: Spanish Civil War; Asturian Revolution of 1934

Commanders
- Notable commanders: Ignacio Hidalgo de Cisneros; Andrés García La Calle; Leocadio Mendiola; Antonio Camacho Benítez; Carlos Núñez Mazas; Ángel Pastor Velasco; Miguel Núñez de Prado; Virgilio Leret Ruiz; Manuel Cascón Briega

Insignia
- Emblem: (1931–1934); (1934–1936)

- Fin flash

- Roundel (1931–1936)

- Roundel (1936–1939)

Aircraft flown
- Attack: Breguet XIX, Vickers Vildebeest, Beechcraft Staggerwing, Gourdou-Leseurre GL-633, Potez 25
- Bomber: Potez 540, Tupolev SB, Bloch MB.200, Bloch MB.210, Polikarpov R-Z, Hawker Spanish Osprey, Macchi M.18, Breguet 413, Breguet 460
- Fighter: Hawker Fury, Bristol Bulldog, Blériot-SPAD S.51, Blériot-SPAD S.91, Dewoitine D.510, Fokker D.XXI, Martinsyde Buzzard, Hispano-Nieuport Ni-52, AEKKEA-RAAB R-29, Avia BH-33, Dewoitine D.372, Polikarpov I-15, Polikarpov I-16, Grumman G-23, Letov Š-31, Letov Š-231, Letov Š-331, Loire 46, Fw 56
- Patrol: Latecoere 28, Spartan Zeus, Lockheed Orion, Fokker C.X, Miles Falcon, RWD 9, Macchi M.18, Potez 58
- Reconnaissance: Polikarpov R-5, Bellanca CH-300, Savoia-Marchetti SM.62, Aero A.101, Koolhoven F.K.51
- Trainer: Monospar ST-4, Monospar ST-12, Avro 594, Avro 626, Avro 643 Cadet, British Aircraft Swallow, Caudron C.270, Caudron C.282, González Gil-Pazó GP-1, Hanriot H.180, Hispano-Suiza E-30, Hispano-Suiza E-34, Miles M.2 Hawk Trainer, Morane-Saulnier MS.181, Morane-Saulnier MS.230, Romano R.82, Romano R.83, SAB-SEMA 10, RSV.32
- Transport: Fokker F-VII.3m/M, Fokker F.XX, De Havilland DH-89M, Farman F 402, Douglas DC-1, Douglas DC-2, Junkers K 30, Airspeed Envoy, Airspeed Viceroy, Avia 51, Blériot 111, Blériot-SPAD S.56, Breguet 26T, Breguet 470, British Aircraft Eagle, Caudron C-440, Caudron C.600 Aiglon, Consolidated Fleetster, Couzinet 101, Ford Trimotor, General Aircraft ST-25, Hanriot LH.437, Latécoère 28, Lioré et Olivier 213, Northrop Delta, Northrop Gamma, Potez 560, Vultee V-1; See also List of aircraft of the Spanish Republican Air Force

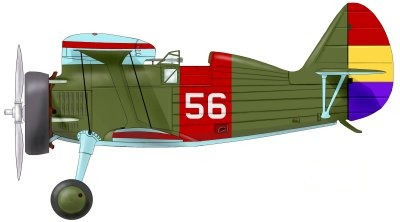
The Chato No. 56 flown by Frank Glasgow Tinker in the 1st Sq Lacalle. He scored four victories in this aircraft. Occasionally he flew No. 58 as well.

The Spanish Republican Air Force was the air arm of the Armed Forces of the Second Spanish Republic, the legally established government of Spain between 1931 and 1939. Initially divided into two branches: Military Aeronautics (Aeronáutica Militar) and Naval Aeronautics (Aeronáutica Naval), the Republican Air Force became the Air Forces of the Spanish Republic (Fuerzas Aéreas de la República Española (FARE)), also known as Arma de Aviación, (Note: Some authors favor the name Arma de Aviación, claiming that the term Fuerzas Aéreas de la República Española (FARE) was only used later by some pilots such as Francisco Tarazona in their memories (Francisco Tarazona Torán, Yo fui piloto de caza rojo.)) after it was reorganized following the restructuring of the Republican Armed Forces in September 1936, at the beginning of the Spanish Civil War. This defunct Air Force is largely known for the intense action it saw during the Civil War, from July 1936 till its disbandment in 1939.

The Spanish Republican Air Force was popularly known as "La Gloriosa" (The Glorious One). But, according to some historians, the command structure of the Spanish loyalist forces was marred by ineptitude and lack of decision-making throughout the Civil War. Starting from the crucial first weeks of the conflict in July 1936, the rebel side was able to undertake a massive airlift of troops from Spanish Morocco using mostly the slow Ju 52, without any Spanish Republican interference. This was the world's first long-range combat airlift and the military planes on the Spanish Republican side failed to check it.

The Battle of Guadalajara and the defence of the skies over Madrid against Nationalist bombing raids during the capital's long siege would be the only scenarios where the loyalist air force took part in an effective manner. In other important republican military actions, such as the Segovia Offensive, the Battle of Teruel and the decisive Battle of the Ebro, where the Aviación Nacional was relentlessly strafing the loyalist positions with accurate low-level attacks, the republican military airplanes were practically absent from the skies. Moreover, when they appeared and attacked, they did so in an unorganized and inadequate manner that mostly failed to achieve positive effects. Most of the Spanish Republican planes that survived the conflict were repainted with the markings of the Aviación Nacional after the defeat of the Spanish Republic in the Iberian battlefields.

== History ==
Like all the branches of the Spanish Republican Armed Forces, the Spanish Republican Air Force went through two clear phases during its existence:

- The pre-Civil War phase, before the coup of July 1936 that would fracture the Spanish military institution
- The Civil War reorganization of the forces that remained loyal to the established republican government dictated by the pressing needs of the moment.

=== First years ===
At the time of the democratic municipal elections that led to the proclamation of the Spanish Republic, the Spanish Air Force (Aeronáutica Española), under the names Aeronáutica Militar and Aeronáutica Naval, the former being the air arm of the Spanish Republican Army and the latter the naval aviation of the Spanish Republican Navy, included mainly French planes, some of which were remnants of the Rif War (1920–1926). Once the Republican Government was established, General Luis Lombarte Serrano replaced pro-monarchist General Alfredo Kindelán as chief-commander of the air force, but he would be quickly succeeded by Commander Ramón Franco, younger brother of later dictator Francisco Franco, a national hero who had earlier made a Trans-Atlantic flight in the Plus Ultra hydroplane.

Aviation was developing in those years in Spain; in 1931 Captain Cipriano Rodríguez Díaz and Lieutenant Carlos de Haya González flew non-stop to Equatorial Guinea, then a Spanish colonial outpost.

In 1933, under Capitan Warlela, systematic cadastral surveys of Spain were carried out using modern methods of aerial photography. The following year Spanish engineer Juan de la Cierva took off and landed on seaplane carrier Dédalo with his autogyro C-30P. In 1934 Commander Eduardo Sáenz de Buruaga became new chief-commander of the air force. On the same year a major restructuring of the Spanish military air wing took place.

Following a Government decree dated 2 October 1935, the Dirección General de Aeronáutica was placed under the authority of the War Ministry, Ministerio de la Guerra, instead of under the prime minister of Spain, following which in 1936 the Air Force regional units became restructured. Accordingly, the Spanish Navy-based Escuadra model was replaced by Región Militar divisions which are still operative today in the Spanish Air Force.

Five years after the proclamation of the Spanish republic, a section of the Republican Army in Spanish Morocco rebelled under the orders of General Francisco Franco. The rebellion succeeded only in fractioning Spain and Franco went ahead and began a bloody war of attrition, the Spanish Civil War.

During the Civil War the Air Force of the Spanish republican government would have to fight against the better equipped Aviación Nacional, created by the fraction of the army in revolt and their powerful Italian Fascist and Third Reich supporters.

=== Spanish Civil War ===
After 18 July 1936 coup d'état, the Republican government lost the military planes that were in aerodromes under rebel control. The loyalist areas of Spain retained, however, a great part of the 60 Breguet XIX, 27 Vickers Vildebeest and 56 Hispano-Nieuport Ni-52 planes that the Spanish Air Force had before the hostilities, for the Republic had the control of the majority of the territory. Nevertheless, confronted with a war of attrition in the same month, the Spanish Republican government bought in France 14 Dewoitine D.371, 10 Dewoitine D.373 and 49 Potez 540, among other military aircraft, for the value of 12 million francs. All these planes were largely obsolete at the time, so that in the first four months after the start of the hostilities, the only aircraft of the Republican government that could be considered modern were three Douglas DC-2s that had been purchased recently for LAPE, the Republican airline in March 1935. These were requisitioned by the Spanish Republican Air Force and used as military transports.

Within the month of his military coup, the help received by Francisco Franco from Nazi Germany (Condor Legion) and Fascist Italy (Aviazione Legionaria) gave the rebels the upper hand in airpower over Spain. The first German and Italian bombers arrived to increase the size of the rebel air force already in July 1936 and Fiat CR.32 and Heinkel He 51 fighter planes began operating in August. These planes helped the rebel army side to gain full control of the air, as did the Italian Aviazione Legionaria and the German Condor Legion.

In September 1936 the Navy and Air Ministry (Ministerio de Marina y Aire) and the Air Undersecretariat, (Subsecretaria del Aire), both part of the National Defence Ministry (Ministerio de la Defensa Nacional) were established under the command of Indalecio Prieto as minister. For identification purposes the Republican tricolor roundel was replaced by red bands, an insignia that had previously been used on Aeronáutica Naval aircraft during the monarchy in the 1920s, before the time of the Republic. In the same month the first serious air combat took place over Madrid when Italian bombers attacked the city in a massive bombing operation.

The western democracies, like France, the United Kingdom and the United States, did not help the young Spanish Republic. Afraid of the "Communist threat" Neville Chamberlain and Léon Blum were ready to sacrifice Spain, as they later sacrificed Czechoslovakia, in the belief that Hitler could be appeased. In the void thus created, only the Soviet Union helped the Spanish government effectively. At the end of October, four months after the rebels had been supplied with German and Italian aircraft by Adolf Hitler and Benito Mussolini, the first Tupolev SB bombers arrived from Russia. They were nicknamed "Katiuska". One month later the first Soviet fighter planes arrived to alleviate the lack of operational planes in the loyalist side, the Polikarpov I-15, nicknamed "Chato" (Snubnosed) and the Polikarpov I-16, nicknamed "Mosca" (housefly) by the loyalists and "Rata" (rat) by the rebels. The Polikarpov R-5 and the R-Z reconnaissance bombers were known as "Natacha" in the Spanish Republican Air Force.

The Republican air arm was restructured again in May 1937. The new structure included two branches, the Arma de Aviación and the Subsecretaría de Aviación, but unified the Aeronáutica Militar and Aeronáutica Naval. Some sources give this date as the date of the creation of the Spanish Republican Air Force, although it had been previously operative as an air force already. The Republican Air Force would keep this structure until this disbandment two years later. Many planes belonging to the fleet of the Spanish Republican Airline LAPE (Líneas Aéreas Postales Españolas) were requisitioned by the Spanish Republican Air Force and used as military transports.

Innovative, and often lethal, aeronautical bombing techniques were tested by Condor Legion German expeditionary forces against loyalist areas on Spanish soil with the permission of Generalísimo Franco. The pilots of the Spanish Republican Air Force were unable to check these modern-warfare attacks. Their planes were mostly obsolete and often in a bad state of disrepair. The ungainly French Potez 540, a highly vulnerable plane that proved itself a failure in Spanish skies during the Civil War, was labelled as 'Flying Coffin' (Spanish: Ataúd Volante) by loyalist pilots. The rebel side, however, claimed that both air forces were almost equal, since the Soviet Union was helping the loyalist air force, but the fact was that:

... on the other side, the fabled military support provided by the Soviet Union was too little and too late – and generally of poor quality. In addition, whilst the Nationalists received vast supplies on credit from the US and Britain, Stalin's assistance came with strings attached.

The Spanish Republican Air Force was unable to counteract the deadly low-level attacks and close support of the infantry tactics developed by Wolfram von Richthofen during the Civil War. As an air force it became practically ineffective after the Battle of the Ebro in 1938, when the spine of the Spanish Republican Armed Forces was broken. Finally the Spanish Republican Air Force was completely disbanded after the decisive rebel victory on 1 April 1939.

The last Republican military airport in Catalonia was in Vilajuiga, from where on 6 February 1939 Commander Andrés García La Calle led a great part of the planes of the Spanish Republican Air Force to France. The orders had been given in haste by the beleaguered authorities of the doomed Republican Government who wanted to prevent the aircraft from falling into the enemy's hands. The planes landed in Francazal near Toulouse, where the French authorities impounded them, arrested the Spanish Republican pilots, and swiftly interned them in concentration camps.

== Escuadrilla España ==
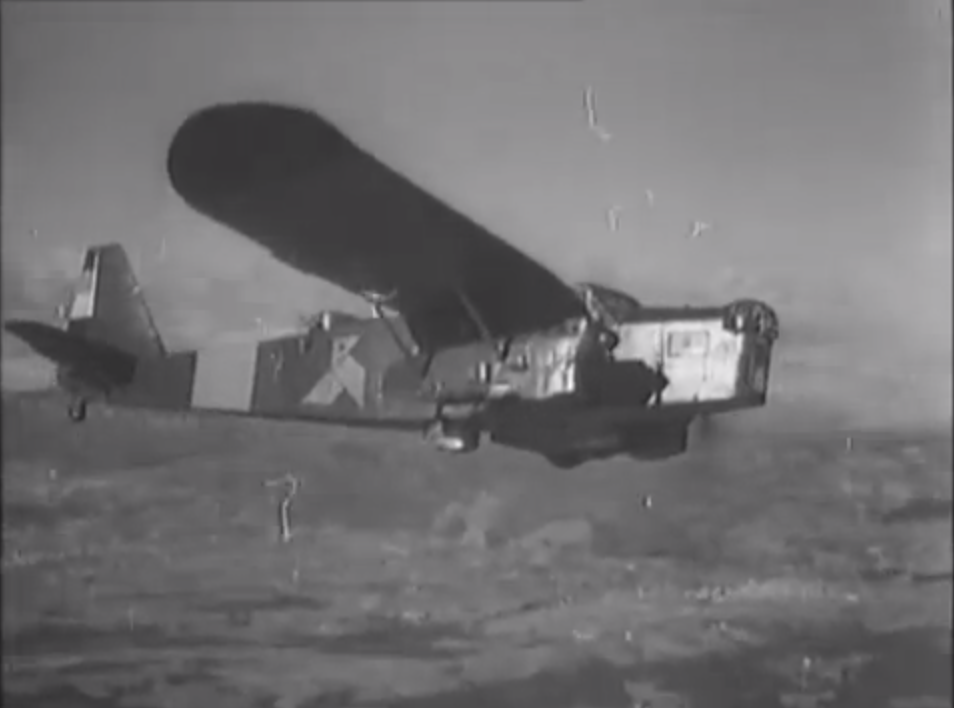
Aircraft supplied by France at the beginning of the conflict were obsolete and slow, an easy target for the more modern and faster Italian and German fighters

The Escuadrilla España or Escuadra España, Squadron España, French: Escadrille Espagne, also known as Escuadrilla Internacional, was a Spanish Republican Air Force unit organized by French writer André Malraux. Even though it was largely ineffective, this squadron became something of a legend after the writer's claims of nearly annihilating part of the rebel army in the Battle of the Sierra Guadalupe at Medellín, Extremadura. The Escuadrilla España reached a maximum of 130 members and would fly a total of 23 combat missions before it was wrapped up in February 1937.

During the 1930s, André Malraux was active in the anti-fascist Popular Front in France. Upon hearing the news of General Franco's rebellion that marked the beginning of the Spanish Civil War, he put himself at the service of the Spanish Republic. Despite opposition from French president Albert Lebrun, Malraux helped to organize the aid to the Republican air force helped by his contacts with highly placed personalities within the French Air Ministry, such as Jean Moulin, future French Resistance leader. Even though President Albert Lebrun opposed direct assistance to the threatened fellow republic, Léon Blum, then the prime minister of France, decided to help the Spanish Republicans with discretion. Thus 20 Potez 540, 5 Bloch 210, 10 Breguet XIX, 17 Dewoitine D.371, 2 Dewoitine D.500/510, 5 Amiot 143, 5 Potez 25 and 6 Loire 46 planes were sent to Spain at the beginning of the conflict. Thirteen more Dewoitine D.371 are mentioned by Jules Moch in his book Recontres avez Leon Blum and the Amiot 143 ended up not being delivered, for aircraft constructor Félix Amiot, who would later become a Nazi collaborator, sympathized with the enemies of Republican Spain in the civil war.

The French planes, however, were not up to the enemy aircraft. The slow Potez 540, some of them badly equipped, rarely survived three months of air missions. Few of the fighters proved to be airworthy, and were delivered intentionally without guns or gun-sights. The French Ministry of Defense had feared that modern types of planes would easily be captured by the Germans fighting for Franco, and the lesser models were a way of maintaining official "neutrality". In the end the French planes were surpassed by more modern types introduced in late 1936 on both sides and their fate was that many of them crashed or were shot down. The crash of Spanish Republican Air Force serial 'Ñ' Potez 540 plane that was shot down by rebel planes over the Sierra de Gúdar range of the Sistema Ibérico near Valdelinares inspired André Malraux to make his L'espoir movie.

In order to give the whole operation an official character, the Spanish Republican War Ministry authorities gave André Malraux the rank of lieutenant colonel, even though he was not a pilot and hadn't even been through military service. This title gave Malraux authority as Squadron Leader of Escuadrilla España, for he was only answerable to general Ignacio Hidalgo de Cisneros, the Spanish Ministerio del Aire commander-in-chief. The writer thus helped to hire crews for the planes, mainly volunteers and professional pilots who had served in the Aéropostale. After the pilots and the planes arrived to Madrid in August 1936, Malraux himself took charge of the organization of the squadron.

Malraux was given considerable autonomy, in Albacete he recruited his own personnel, who escaped the control of the International Brigades run by hard-line Stalinist André Marty who tried to impose discipline. The only thing that held together the writer's motley group of pilots, gunners, mechanicians and airfield assistants and guards, was their common antifascist resolve.

Malraux had to pay a heavy price for his freedom of action though. The Escuadrilla España would suffer a chronic shortage of spare parts and supplies. The number of planes in combat condition was greatly reduced by accidents, lack of quality and by being shot down in action. André Marty, unhappy with the group's autonomy, plotted to bring the Escuadrilla España under his command. Finally the situation was resolved by means of the integration of the squadron in the regular Spanish armed forces. Once the contracts of the professional pilots was severed, the Escuadrilla España would become part of the official Republican Air Force, losing its former status, but taking the name of Escuadrilla Malraux in honor of its founder. The losses, however, escalated, and after covering the flight from enemy-occupied Málaga, the last two bombers were shot down and the Escuadrilla Malraux was formally dissolved.

Even after France joined the Non-Intervention Committee, Malraux helped the Spanish Republic to acquire military aircraft through third countries. The Spanish Republican government circulated photos of Malraux's standing next to some Potez 540 bombers suggesting that France was on their side, at a time when France and the United Kingdom had declared official neutrality. Malraux, however, was not there at the behest of the French Government. Aware of the Republicans' inferior armaments, of which outdated aircraft were just one part of the problem, he toured the United States to raise funds for the Spanish Republican cause. In 1937 he published L'Espoir (Man's Hope), a novel influenced by his Spanish war experiences.

Malraux has often been criticized by opponents for his involvement or motivations in the Spanish Civil War. Comintern sources, for example, described him as an 'adventurer'. The professional pilots of the Escuadrilla España charged exorbitant rates to the Republican Government for their services. Other biographical sources, including fellow combatants, praise Malraux's leadership and sense of camaraderie. At any rate, Malraux's participation in such an historical event as the Spanish Civil War inevitably brought him adversaries, as well as supporters, resulting in a polarization of opinion.

== Soviet pilots in Spain ==
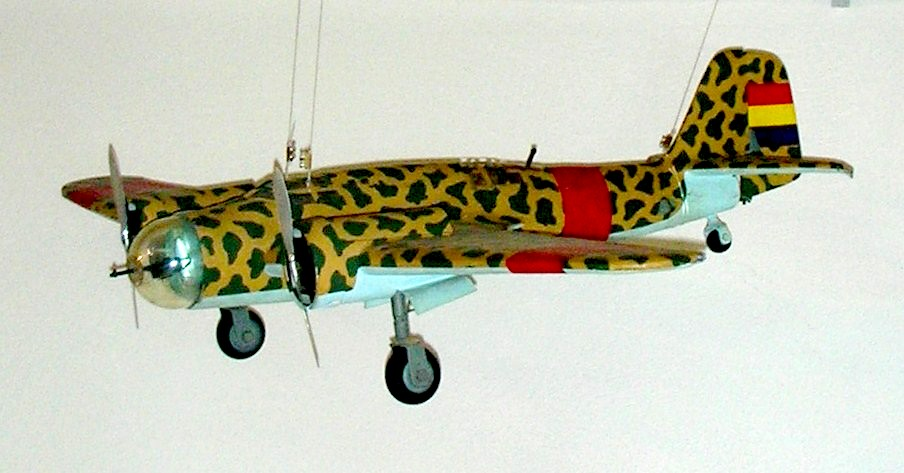
Model of a Spanish Republican Tupolev SB2 Katyuska, La Sénia Museum.

The Soviet Union profited from the international isolation of the Spanish Republic imposed by the non-intervention agreements and assisted the beleaguered Republican government by providing weapons and pilots. Some of the most effective pilots in Spain were young men from the Soviet Union. The Spanish Republican Air Force lacked modern planes and experienced pilots. Unlike most other foreign pilots in the service of the Spanish Republican Air Force, Russian pilots were technically volunteers. They received no incentives, like combat bonuses, to supplement their modest wages.

Many Soviet airmen came in the fall 1936, along with the new aircraft that the Spanish Republic had purchased from Russia. After the western democracies refused military assistance to the established Spanish Government in the name of so-called "Non-Intervention", the Soviet Union and Mexico were practically the only nations that helped Republican Spain in its struggle. In a similar manner as Hitler with his Third Reich re-armament, Joseph Stalin saw the acquisition of first-hand combat experience in Spain by Soviet pilots and technicians as essential for his plans regarding the capability and combat readiness of the Soviet Air Forces. Therefore, much emphasis was placed on detailed reporting of the results of the testing of the new Russian military equipment and air-warfare techniques.

The first planes that came to Spain were Tupolev SB bombers; the fighters would arrive later. Their first action was a morale-lifting bombing raid on the Talavera de la Reina military airfield used by the Legionary Nazi and Italian planes that dropped their bombs over Madrid every day. This action made the Russian pilots very popular among the people in Madrid. The Katiuska pilots took advantage for the time being of their aircraft's relatively higher speed, but the plane was vulnerable and its fuel tanks easily caught fire when shot at. Furthermore, when the Condor Legion brought the speedier Messerschmitt Bf 109 fighters later in the war, the SB squadrons suffered heavy losses.

Anatol Serov, nicknamed "Mateo Rodrigo", established the Escuadrilla de Vuelo Nocturno fighter squadron along with Mikhail Yakushin. This night-flight section would use I-15 Chatos that had modified exhaust pipes, so that the flames in front would not impair the pilot's night vision. M. Yakushin would become the leader of the Night Fighter Squadron that would be quite effective against the Condor Legion Ju 52 night bombing raids.

There were about 300 Russian pilots in or around Madrid by the end of November 1936. The improved defensive capacity of the Spanish Republic boosted the morale of the areas of Spain under loyalist control. The Russian pilots gave their best performance in the Battle of Guadalajara, routing the Italian Aviazione Legionaria and pounding the Fascist militias incessantly from the air.

Following the demands of the Non-Intervention Committee, Soviet pilots were phased out in the fall of 1938 and trained Spanish airmen took their places after having been trained at the flying schools of Albacete, Alicante, Murcia, El Palomar, Alhama, Los Alcázares, Lorca or El Carmolí that had been set up by the Soviet military.

From about 772 Russian airmen that served the Spanish Republican Air Force for over two years, a total of 99 lost their lives. Little gratitude or recognition were shown to the surviving pilots despite their effort and, to compound their sad lot, many would later become victims of the Stalin Purges after their return to the USSR.

== Pilot training ==
The training of pilots, as well as other air force personnel, was trusted to the Instruction Services (Servicios de Instrucción). All the different units of the Instruction Services depended from the Ministerio de Marina y Aire. During the Civil War the instruction bases and centres were scattered throughout the republican zone:

- The High-speed Flying School (Escuela de Vuelo de Alta Velocidad), located at the El Carmolí air base in the Campo de Cartagena.
- The Bomber School (Escuela de bombardeo), located at the Santiago de la Ribera and Los Alcázares air bases.
- The Multiple-engined Aircraft School (Escuela de polimotores), located at Santiago de la Ribera and Los Alcázares as well.
- The Aircraft Mechanics School (Escuela de mecánicos), located at Godella, Valencia Province.
- The Weaponry School (Escuela de Armeros), located at Eibar, Basque Country.

== Fighter aces ==
Name	Country	Service	Victories	Observations
Lev L. Shestakov	Russia	4ª Escuadrilla de Moscas	39	His total victory count may be 42
Sergei I. Gritsevets	Russia	5ª Escuadrilla de Caza	30	Nicknamed "Sergio"
Manuel Zarauza Clavero	Spain	3ª & 4ª Escuadrilla de Caza	23	Reputed to be the most skilled Spanish pilot on the Mosca. Exiled in the USSR and KIFA over Baku on 12/October/1942
Leopoldo Morquillas Rubio	Spain	3ª & 2ª Escuadrilla de Caza	21	Also in Escuadrilla Vasca
Pavel Rychagov	Russia	1ª Escuadrilla de Chatos	20	Nicknamed "Pablo Palancar". Arrested and executed in Stalin's 1941 purge
Anatol Serov	Russia	1ª Escuadrilla de Chatos	16	Nicknamed "Mateo Rodrigo"; He established the Escuadrilla Vuelo Nocturno night-flight squadron
Vladimir Bobrov	Russia		13	Flew more than 100 combat missions
Andrés García La Calle	Spain	1ª Escuadrilla de Chatos	11	Supreme commander of the fighter squadrons of the Spanish Republic in Dec. 1938
Manuel Aguirre López	Spain	1ª Escuadrilla, Grupo 21	11	Also in 3ª Escuadrilla de Moscas
Abel Guidez	France	Escuadrilla España	10	
José María Bravo Fernández	Spain	1ª & 3ª Escuadrilla de Caza	10	Became Commander of 3ª Escuadrilla de Caza and Grupo 21. Exiled in the USSR he took part in World War II as a Soviet pilot. Some documents ascribe him 23 victories
Juan Comas Borrás	Spain	3ª Escuadrilla de Caza	10	Also in Escuadrilla Lacalle & Esc. Vasca. KIA on 24/Jan/1939
Emilio Ramirez Bravo	Spain	4ª Escuadrilla de Caza	10	Also in Escuadrilla Lacalle
Miguel Zambudio Martinez	Spain	Escuadrilla Vasca	10	Also in 3ª Escuadrilla de Caza, 26 Grupo de Caza
Antonio Arias Arias	Spain	1ª, 3ª & 4ª Escuadrilla de Caza	9	Exiled in Russia, Arias fought in the Soviet Air Forces during World War II. He returned to Madrid as an old man in 1990 and retired.
Vicente Beltrán Rodrigo	Spain	1ª Escuadrilla de Chatos	9	Also in 3ª Escuadrilla, Grupo 21, shot down in Battle of the Ebro. Exiled in Russia, joined the Soviet Air Forces. Returned to Spain in 1958
Frank Glasgow Tinker	United States	1ª Escuadrilla de Chatos	8	Part of the Yankee Squadron
Sabino Cortizo Bertolo	Spain	5ª & 3ª Escuadrilla de Caza	8	KIA on 21/Jan/1939
José Falcón San Martín	Spain	5ª & 3ª Escuadrilla de Caza	8	Also in Escuadrilla Vuelo Nocturno
Pavel Agafonov	Spain	Escuadrilla Palancar	8	Nicknamed "Ahmed Amba". Returned to the USSR in April 1937
Felipe del Río Crespo	Spain	Escuadrilla Vasca	7	Also in Escuadrilla Norte (1937); KIA on 23/Apr/1937
Juan Lario Sanchez	Spain	4ª & 2ª Escuadrilla de Caza	7	
Jan Ferák	Czechoslovakia	Escuadrilla España	7	Dewoitine D.372 pilot
Francisco Meroño Pellicer	Spain	1ª & 6ª Escuadrilla de Caza	7	Also in Escuadrilla Norte (1937)
Orrin B. Bell	USA	1ª Escuadrilla de Chatos	7	Shot down 7 He 51 over the Córdoba-Granada front
Andrés Fierro Menú	Spain	1ª Escuadrilla de Chatos	7	Had engine trouble during a mission protecting Tupolev SB bombers; was taken prisoner following emergency landing at Almenar airfield. After escaping he reached the USSR where he joined the Soviet Air Forces
Francisco Tarazona Torán	Mexico	1ª & 3ª Escuadrilla de Caza	6	Claims 8 victories in his autobiographical book.
José Pascual Santamaria	Spain	1ª Escuadrilla de Caza	6	Also in Escuadrilla Norte (1937)
Ivan Trofimovich Yeryomenko	Russia	1ª Escuadrilla de Chatos	6	Nicknamed "Ramón", "Antonio Aragón". or "Alexandrio"; Leader of the 1ª Escuadrilla between May and October 1937.
Evgeny Nikolayevitch Stepanov	Russia	1ª Escuadrilla de Chatos	6	Knew how to use the "aerial ramming" technique. Shot down over Ojos Negros and made prisoner on 17/Jan/1938; Returned to Russia and fought in World War II in the Soviet Air Forces
Božidar "Boško" Petrović	Yugoslavia	2ª Escuadrilla, Grupo 12	5	Nicknamed "Fernandez Garcia"
Rafael Magrina Vidal	Spain	2ª Escuadrilla de Caza	5	KIA on 16/Jul/1937
Julio Pereiro Peréz	Spain	2ª, 4ª & 5ª Escuadrilla de Caza	5	
Harold E. Dahl	USA	Escuadrilla Lacalle	5	Nicknamed "Rubio". Also in 1ª Escuadrilla de Caza
Sergei Fyodorovich Tarkhov	Russia	1ª Escuadrilla de Caza	5	Nicknamed "Capitán Antonio". Some authors claim Tarkhov flew a Chato. However, he was most likely a Mosca pilot.
William Labussière	France	1ª Escuadrilla de Chatos	5	Fought also in World War II
James Peck	USA	1ª Escuadrilla de Chatos	5	One of the few African-American pilots in the Spanish Republican Air Force. 4 victories unconfirmed

== Ranks ==
Rank group	General / flag officers	Senior officers			Junior officers
Spanish Republican Air Force (1936–1939)
Spanish Republican Air Force (1936–1939)	General	Coronel	Teniente coronel	Comandante	Capitán	Teniente	Alférez

Preceding agencies

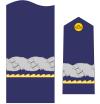
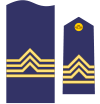
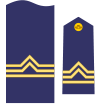
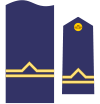
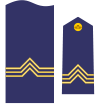
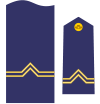
Rank group	General / flag officers	Senior officers			Junior officers
Aeronáutica Militar (1931–1936)
Aeronáutica Militar (1931–1936)	Jefe superior	Jefe de base	Jefe de escuadra	Jefe de grupo	Jefe de escuadrilla	Oficial aviador	-
Aeronáutica Naval (1931–1936)
Aeronáutica Naval (1931–1936)		Capitán de navío	Capitán de fragata	Capitán de corbeta	Teniente de navío	Alférez de navío	Alférez de fragata

== Aircraft, insignia and historical documents ==
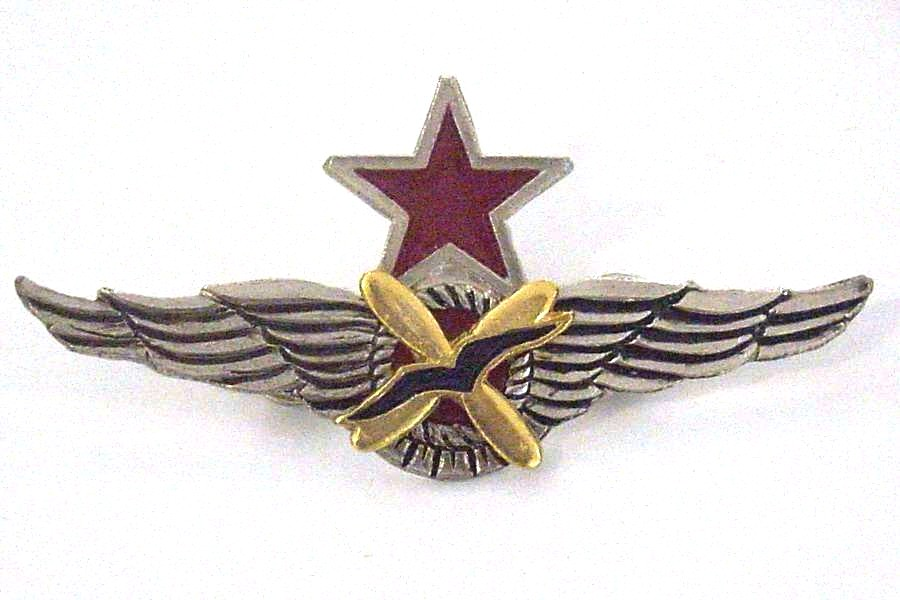
Fighter pilot wings in the Civil War

Dewoitine D.510

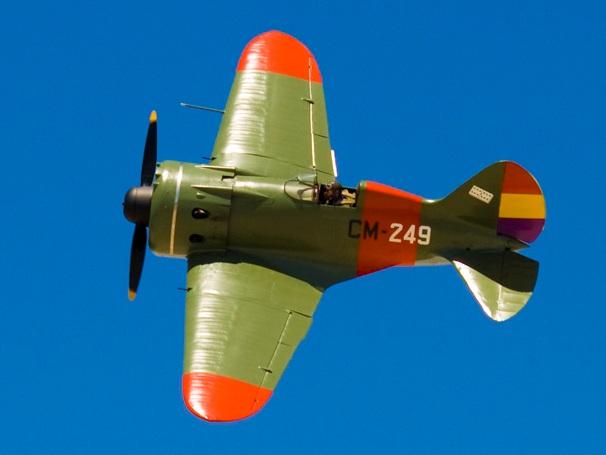
A Polikarpov I-16 "Mosca" in flight

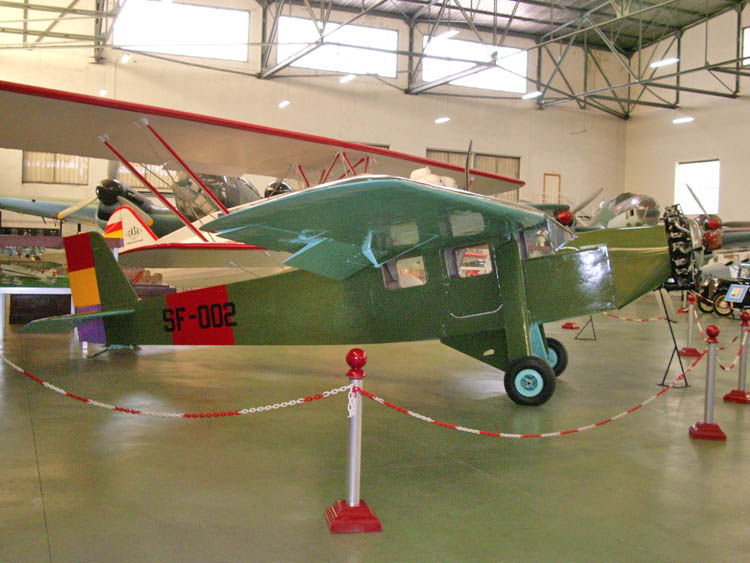
Farman F 402 of the Spanish Republican Air Force. Museo del Aire, Cuatro Vientos

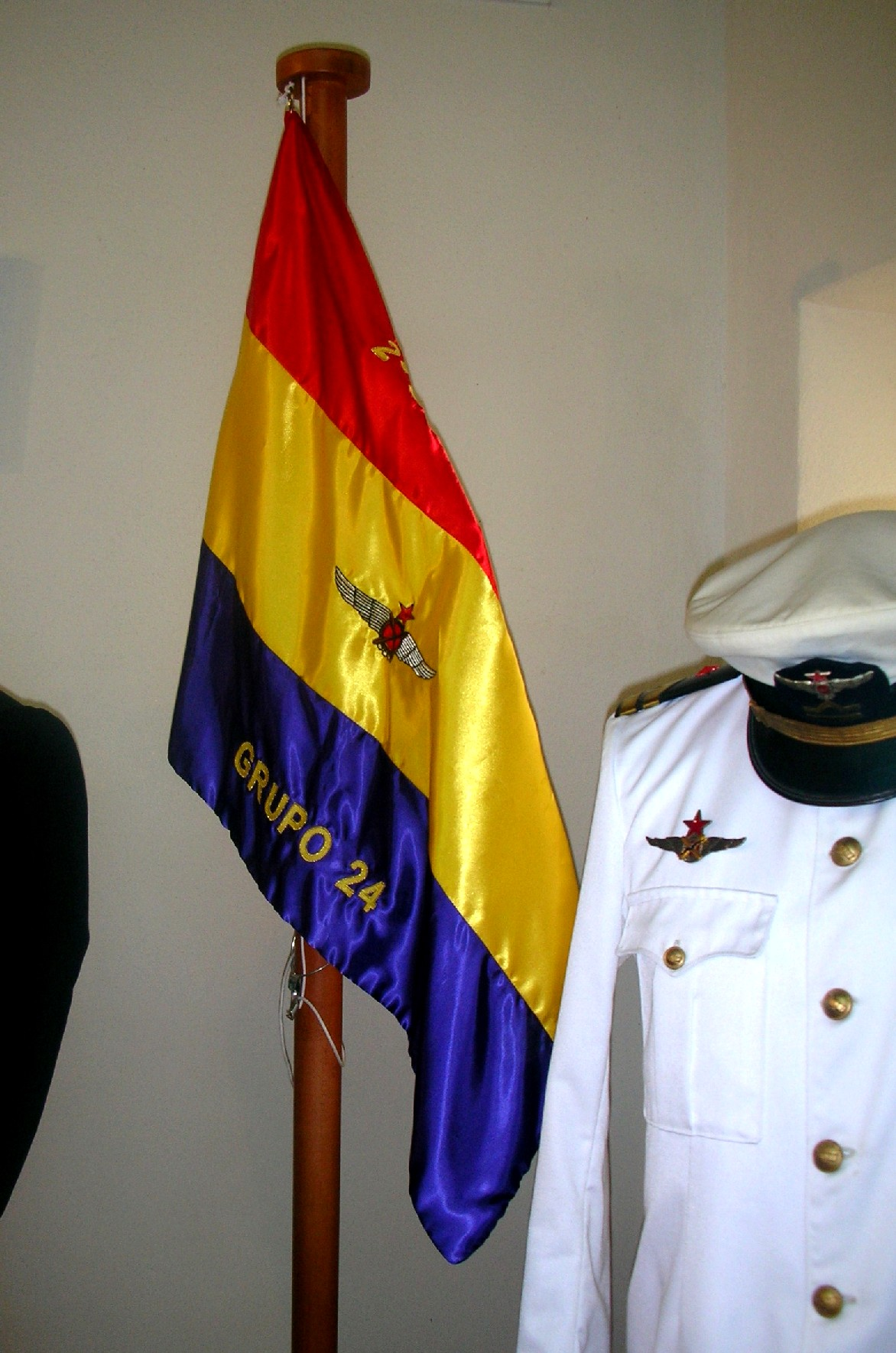
Spanish Republican Air Force 2a Escuadrilla, Grupo 24 standard and pilot's summer uniform. La Sénia Museum

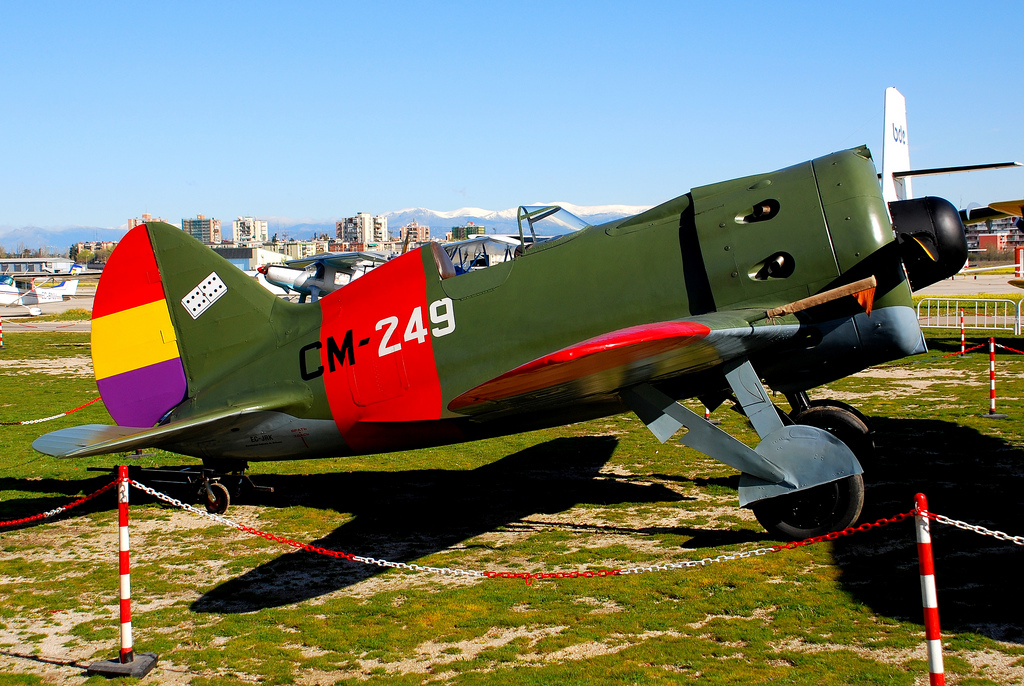
Polikarpov I-16 restored by the Fundación Infante de Orleans

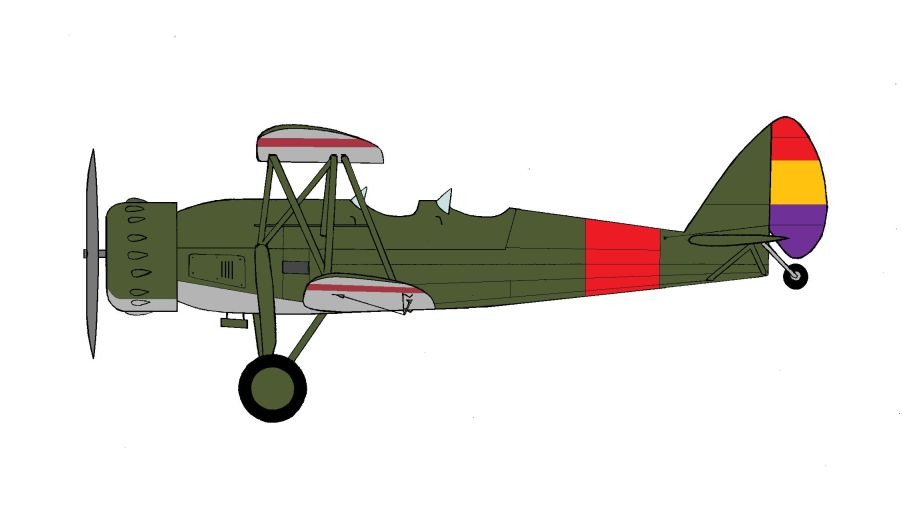
Romano R.80.2 of the military training facility at El Carmolí.

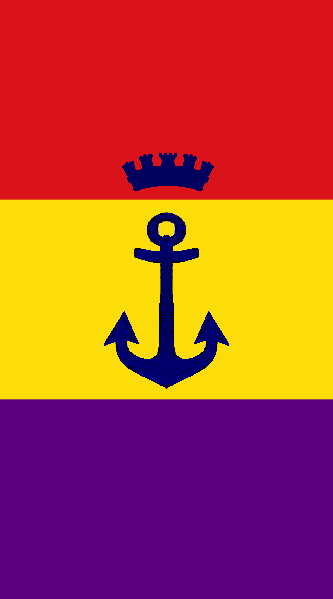
Fin flash of the Aeronáutica Naval, the naval aviation of the Spanish Republican Navy which was merged with the Air Force in September 1936

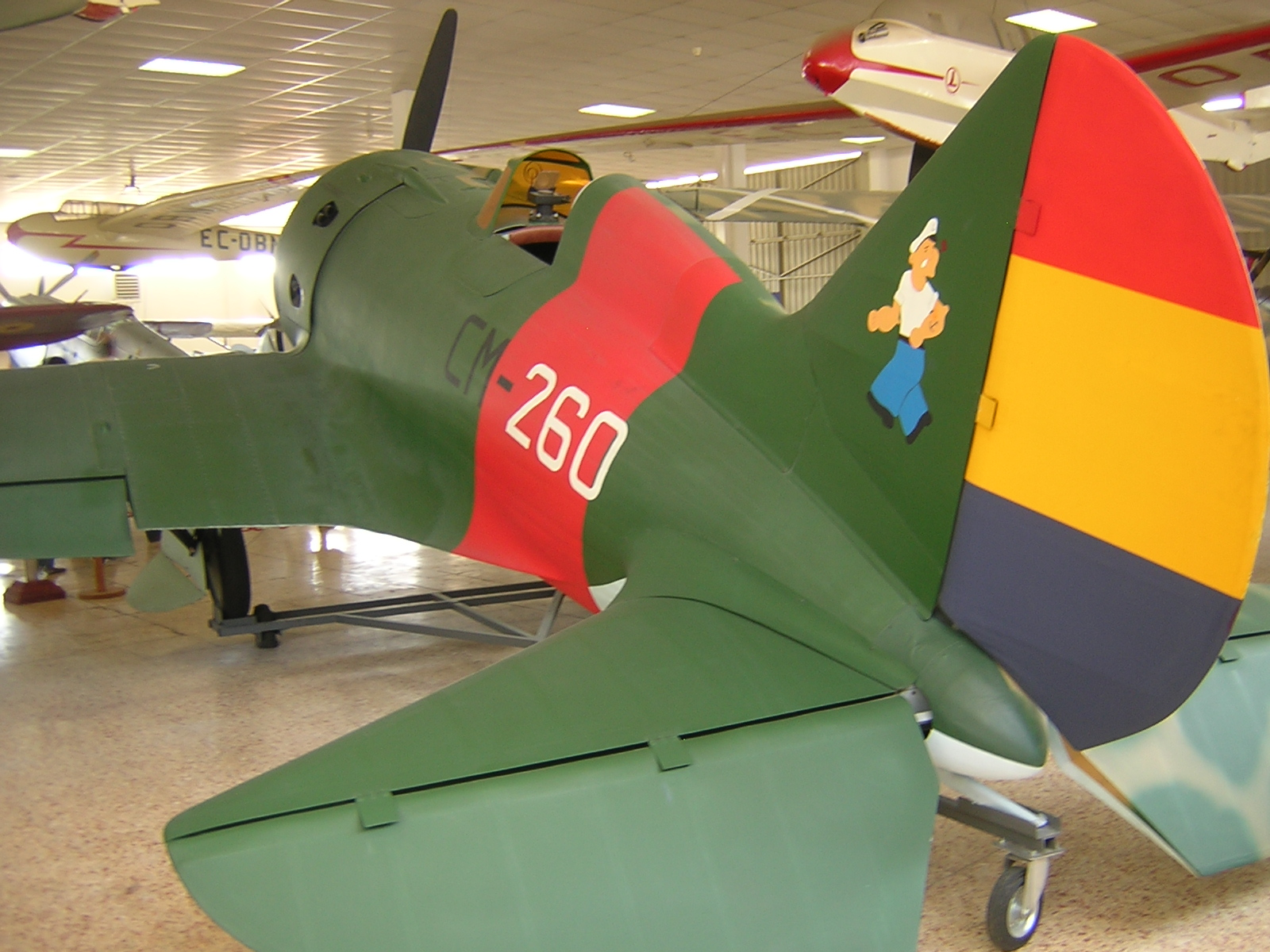
Popeye on the Spanish Republican Polikarpov I-16 of Antonio Arias Arias, commander of the 4th squadron. Museo del Aire, Cuatro Vientos, Madrid. Other characters on Spanish Republican planes included Mickey Mouse and Betty Boop.

== See also ==
- Spanish Air Force
- Spanish Civil War
- LAPE (Líneas Aéreas Postales Españolas), Spanish Republican Airline
- List of aircraft of the Spanish Republican Air Force
- List of Spanish Civil War air aces
- Deutschland incident (1937)
- Aviazione Legionaria
- Condor Legion
- German re-armament
- Some Still Live
- Yankee Squadron
- Timofey Khryukin

== Bibliography ==
- Antonio Arias Arias, Arde el Cielo: Memorias de un Piloto de Caza Participante en la Guerra de España (1936-1939) y en la Gran Guerra Patria de la URSS (1941-1945). Edited by A. Delgado Romero, 1995. Silla, Valencia. (Memoirs of a Spanish Republican Air Force fighter pilot and squadron leader, who later fought for the Soviet Union during WW2).
- Green, William & Swanborough, Gordon (February–May 1979). "A Grumman by Any Other Name...". Air Enthusiast (9): 26–39. ISSN 0143-5450.
- Green, William & Swanborough, Gordon. "Soviet Flies in Spanish Skies". Air Enthusiast Quarterly, No. 1, n.d., pp. 1–16. ISSN 0143-5450
- Howson, Gerald (August–November 1990). "Fokker's Trimotors Go to War". Air Enthusiast (13): 43–49. ISSN 0143-5450.
- Herr, Allen (January–February 1999). "Eagles over Malaga: American Pilots in the Spanish Civil War". Air Enthusiast (79): 42–53. ISSN 0143-5450.
- Laureau, Patrick (May 1978). "Polikarpov I-15 "Chato": Un chasseur russe au destin exotique..., partie 1" [Polkarpov I-15 "Chato": A Russian Fighter in an Exotic Destination, Part 1]. Le Fana de l'Aviation (in French) (102): 34–41. ISSN 0757-4169.
- Laureau, Patrick (June 1978). "Polikarpov I-15 "Chato": Un chasseur russe au destin exotique..., partie 2" [Polkarpov I-15 "Chato": A Russian Fighter in an Exotic Destination, Part 2]. Le Fana de l'Aviation (in French) (103): 42–45. ISSN 0757-4169.
- Leyvastre, Pierre. "The Day of the Dewoitine". Air Enthusiast Quarterly, No. 1, n.d., pp. 17–19, 84–96. ISSN 0143-5450
- Carmen Calvo Jung, Los Últimos Aviadores de la República ISBN 9788497815444
