= Francazal =

- Commune
- Location of Francazal
- Location within France Location within Occitanie
- Coordinates: 43°01′11″N 0°59′51″E
- Country: France
- Region: Occitania
- Department: Haute-Garonne
- Arrondissement: Saint-Gaudens
- Canton: Bagnères-de-Luchon

Government
  - Mayor (2020–2026): Jean-Pierre Mare
- Area^{1}: 5.46 km^{2} (2.11 sq mi)
- Elevation: 420 m (1,380 ft)
- Highest elevation: 1,254 m (4,114 ft)
- Lowest elevation: 371 m (1,217 ft)
- Population (2023): 28
  - Density: 5.1/km^{2} (13/sq mi)
- Time zone: UTC+01:00 (CET)
  - Summer (DST): UTC+02:00 (CEST)
- INSEE/Postal code: 31195 /31260
- ^{1} French Land Register data, which excludes lakes, ponds, glaciers > 1 km^{2} (0.386 sq mi or 247 acres) and river estuaries.

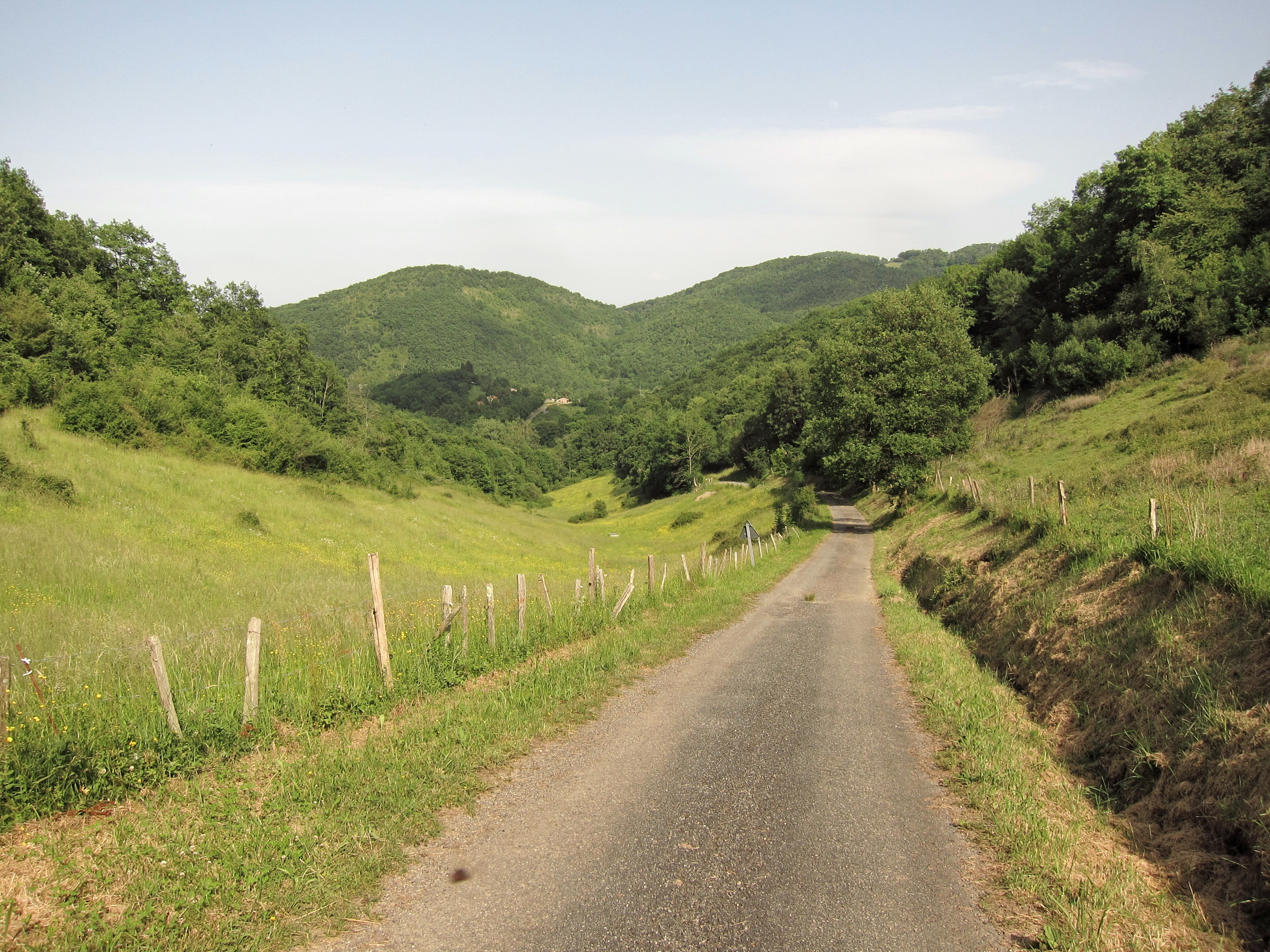
Francazal

Francazal (French pronunciation: [fʁɑ̃kazal]; Occitan: Hranccasau) is a commune in the Haute-Garonne department in southwestern France.

== Population ==
Historical population
Year	Pop.	±% p.a.
1968	16	—
1975	5	−15.31%
1982	10	+10.41%
1990	19	+8.35%
1999	16	−1.89%
2007	21	+3.46%
2012	18	−3.04%
2017	29	+10.01%
2023	28	−0.58%
Source: INSEE

== See also ==
- Communes of the Haute-Garonne department
