= Moskalyev SAM-11 =

SAM-11

General information
- Type: Four seat amphibian
- National origin: USSR
- Manufacturer: GAZ-18,Voronezh
- Designer: Aleksandr Sergeyevitch Moskalyev
- Number built: 1

History
- First flight: (SAM-11) 1939-40; (SAM-11bis) September or October 1940
- Developed from: Moskalyev SAM-5bis-2

The Moskalyev SAM-11 was an amphibious version of the SAM-5bis-2, with a flying boat hull, retractable landing gear and raised engine and tail to avoid spray. Only one was built.

== Design and development ==
Like the Moskalyev SAM-10, the wooden SAM-11 was a development of the SAM-5bis-2, sharing the same cantilever high wing and tail though with the tailplane raised well above the fuselage.

The original SAM-11 was powered by a tractor configuration, 220 kW (300 hp) inverted, air-cooled, six cylinder inline Bessonov MM-1 engine in a nacelle above the wing on a central pylon.

The amphibian had a two-step planing bottom of V-section, with the first step under mid-chord. The hull was flat-sided and contained a cabin for the pilot and three passengers with the pilot ahead of the wing leading edge and with two windows on each side for the passengers. Rounded upper decking behind the cabin led to a blunted triangular fin and more rounded rudder. The triangular plan tailplane was mounted at about one third fin height and carried rounded, tabbed elevators, separated for rudder movement.

On water the SAM-11 relied for stability on stepless stabilizing floats, wing-mounted on pairs of vertical struts and braced by inward leaning struts. On land there were a pair of mainwheels on bungee-sprung, cantilever legs like those of the SAM-5bis-2. There, the legs were fixed to the fuselage underside but the planing bottom of the SAM-11 meant that they had to be attached to the plywood-covered sides, reinforced in that area. The legs and their trailing drag struts were hinged so the wheels could be manually cranked up into wing recesses. The rear step carried a small, fixed tailwheel on a streamlined extension. Aft, there was a small water rudder.

== Operational history ==
The SAM-11 was built in 1939 but its date of first flight is not known. That first flight was not a success; turbulent prop-wash reaching the tail surfaces produced a loss of control and the SAM-11 was damaged. It was rebuilt as the SAM-11 bis, fitted with a 200 kW (270 hp) Voronezh MV-6 engine in a redesigned nacelle, the engine change forced by unobtainability of the more powerful MM-1. It was first flown in early autumn 1940.

It was officially tested at Sevastopol and flew satisfactorily but did not reach production as its payload with the lower power MV-6 was judged too small.

== Variants ==
SAM-11
Original design with 220 kW (300 hp) MM-1 engine

SAM-11bis
Rebuilt SAM-11 with 200 kW (270 hp) MV-6 engine in revised nacelle

== Specifications (SAM-10bis) ==
Data from <Osprey Encyclopedia of Russian Aircraft 1875-1995

General characteristics

- Crew: one
- Capacity: three passengers
- Length: 8.74 m (28 ft 8 in)
- Wingspan: 11.49 m (37 ft 8 in)
- Wing area: 21.86 m^{2} (235.3 sq ft)
- Empty weight: 1,030 kg (2,271 lb)
- Gross weight: 1,510 kg (3,329 lb)
- Powerplant: 1 × Voronezh MV-6 inverted, air-cooled, six cylinder inline, 200 kW (270 hp)
- Propellers: 2-bladed

Performance

- Maximum speed: 240 km/h (150 mph, 130 kn) at 2,400 m (7,900 ft)
- Service ceiling: 5,600 m (18,400 ft)
- Take-off distance: 200 m (660 ft)
- Landing speed and distance: 85 km/h (53 mph; 46 kn), 110 m (360 ft)
