= Caudron C.580 =

General information
- Type: Advanced trainer aircraft
- National origin: France
- Manufacturer: Société des Avions Caudron
- Number built: 2

History
- First flight: 22 December 1934
- Developed from: Caudron C.530 Rafale
- Developed into: Caudron C.720

The Caudron C.580 was a French advanced trainer aircraft intended to prepare pilots for the new low wing monoplane fighters of the mid-1930s. It did not go into production and only two were built.

== Design ==
The C.580 was designed to train fighter pilots in a single-seat, low wing monoplane, the standard layout of new fighter aircraft in the mid-1930s, It was low-powered but fast, capable of aerobatics and fitted with a camera in place of a gun. Caudron had already designed several aircraft with this layout; the two closest to the C.580 were the C.430 and C.530 Raphales, though these were two-seat machines.

Its cantilever, two piece, wooden wing was straight tapered in plan to semi-elliptical tips. Each wing was built around a single, spruce box spar and covered with birch plywood. There were short ailerons near the tips and inboard split flaps.

The Caudron C.580 was powered by Renault 4Pei, an air-cooled, four cylinder, inverted in-line engine which produced 116 kW (155 hp) for take-off. The fuselage was built around four ash longerons, joined horizontally by N-form, spruce trellises and with birch ply sides with spruce stiffeners. The upper fuselage surface was curved and the forward fuselage from the engine firewall to the cabin was partly occupied by the fuel tank. Its large, fully glazed cockpit was mostly aft of the trailing edge of the wing and was smoothly faired into the rear fuselage with a magnesium upper surface.

The tail unit of the C.580 was conventional, with a tapered tailplane mounted at mid-fuselage height carrying inset elevators. The fin was also straight tapered and the rudder inset. All the control surfaces were ply covered and unbalanced, so the tailplane's angle of incidence could be adjusted in flight and was interconnected to the flaps.

The C.580 had conventional landing gear with a track of 1.65 m (5.4 ft). Its balloon-tyred mainwheels, under large fairings, were attached by short vertical oleo struts to the wing spars. The tailskid had a case-hardened steel shoe on a rubber block fixed to a pair of welded steel shells.

== Development ==
The Caudron C.580 first flew on 22 December 1934 having been registered as F-ANAS two days before. In the week beginning 18 March 1935 it went to the Centre d'Essais de Matériels Aériens at Villacoublay for its official tests, which continued until July that year. It proved to be unstable at high angles-of-attack and had poor spinning characteristics, and was therefore not recommended for military use. A second C.580 was built (F-ANAT), flying in March 1935, but was destroyed when it hit a hangar during a take-off accident in May that year. The first prototype was slightly modified during 1935 and redesignated the C.581. It continued to be used for aerobatic flying by Caudron test pilots into 1939. The civil register notes a change in ownership of the first prototype in March 1939.

== Specifications ==
Data from Les Ailes 9 May 1935

General characteristics

- Crew: One
- Length: 7.00 m (23 ft 0 in)
- Wingspan: 7.10 m (23 ft 4 in)
- Height: 2.52 m (8 ft 3 in) to propeller tip
- Wing area: 9.00 m^{2} (96.9 sq ft)
- Empty weight: 539 kg (1,188 lb)
- Gross weight: 710 kg (1,565 lb)
- Fuel capacity: 80 L (18 imp gal; 21 US gal)
- Powerplant: 1 × Renault 4Pei 4-cylinder, air-cooled inverted in-line, 104–116 kW (140–155 hp)
- Propellers: 2-bladed

Performance

- Maximum speed: 320 km/h (200 mph, 170 kn)
- Cruise speed: 262 km/h (163 mph, 141 kn) at 4,000 m (13,000 ft)
- Minimum control speed: 106 km/h (66 mph, 57 kn) with full flaps
- Range: 800 km (500 mi, 430 nmi)
- Endurance: 2.5 hr
- Service ceiling: 6,600 m (21,700 ft) practical
- Rate of climb: 9 m/s (1,800 ft/min) at ground level

== Bibliography ==
- Mihaly, Edouard (January 1978). "Montures pour apprentis chasseurs... les Caudron-Renault d'entrainment, partie 1" [Mounts for Trainee Fighters... the Caudron-Renault Trainers, Part One]. Le Fana de l'Aviation (in French) (98): 8–13. ISSN 0757-4169.
