= SNCASE SE-2100 =

Experimental two-seat French touring aircraft

SE-2100
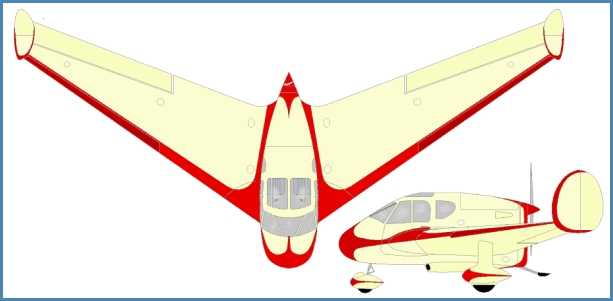

General information
- Type: Two seat experimental tailless pusher touring aircraft
- National origin: France
- Manufacturer: Sud-Est (Société nationale des constructions aéronautiques du Sud-Est or SNCASE)
- Designer: Pierre Satre
- Number built: 1

History
- First flight: 4 October 1945

The Sud-Est or SNCASE SE-2100, sometimes known as the Satre SE-2100 after its designer, was a tailless, pusher configuration touring monoplane with a single engine and cabin for two. Only one was built.

== Design and development ==
The SE-2100 was designed by Pierre Satre, later the chief designer of the Concorde, as a response to a 1943 specification by the Vichy French Air Ministry for a two-seat touring aircraft. An all-metal aircraft, it had a low, cantilever, straight tapered wing with 55° of sweep on the leading edge and 10.43° of dihedral. There were fixed leading edge slots and trailing edge ailerons but no conventional flaps. The wing tips carried large, rounded fins with rudder-like rear portions which only moved outwards; they were used differentially for yaw control and jointly as flaps.

The SE-2010 had a short, blunt-nosed nacelle-type fuselage with a cabin which could be configured to seat one centrally or two in side-by-side, dual control configuration. The seats were just aft of the leading edge, with a baggage compartment behind them. Access was via deep, wide, forward hinged doors on both sides; to make this possible, a piece of the wing root leading edge was an integral part of each door. A 140 hp (104 kW) Renault Bengali 4 four cylinder, inverted, inline engine was mounted in pusher configuration behind the cabin and air-cooled via a ventral scoop; it drove a two-blade propeller positioned just behind the trailing edge. The SE-2100's fixed, tricycle undercarriage had pneumatic shock absorbers and mainwheel brakes; the nosewheel was free-swivelling. At different times the undercarriage legs and wheels were unfaired or faired.

The SE-2010 flew for the first time on 4 October 1945. Despite demonstrating promising performance and showing high manoeuvrability when demonstrated at the 1946 Paris Air Show, no production followed, with the prototype surviving into the early 1950s.

== Specifications ==
Data from Jane's All the World's Aircraft 1948

General characteristics

- Crew: Two
- Length: 4.9 m (16 ft 1 in)
- Wingspan: 9.89 m (32 ft 5 in)
- Height: 1.89 m (6 ft 2 in)
- Wing area: 15.11 m^{2} (162.6 sq ft)
- Airfoil: S.T. Ae.230 (Abrial-3) at root, NACA 009 at tips
- Empty weight: 518 kg (1,142 lb)
- Gross weight: 800 kg (1,764 lb)
- Fuel capacity: 144 L (31.7 Imp gal; 38.0 US gal)
- Powerplant: 1 × Renault 4Pei 4-cylinder inverted air-cooled inline engine, 140 kW (190 hp) at 500 m (1,640 ft) and 2,400 rpm
- Propellers: 2-bladed, 1.90 m (6 ft 3 in) diameter wooden

Performance

- Maximum speed: 226 km/h (140 mph, 122 kn)
- Cruise speed: 198 km/h (123 mph, 107 kn)
- Range: 500 km (310 mi, 270 nmi)
- Service ceiling: 5,000 m (16,000 ft)
- Wing loading: 52.83 kg/m^{2} (10.82 lb/sq ft)
- Landing speed: 90 km/h (56 mph; 49 kn)

== Bibliography ==
- Bridgman, Leonard (1948). Jane's All the World's Aircraft 1948. London: Sampson, Low, Marston and Co. Ltd.
- de Narbonne, Roland (October 2005). "Octobre 1945, dans l'aéronautique française: Trois espoirs déçus". Le Fana de l'Aviation (in French). No. 431. pp. 70–75.
- Pelletier, Alain J. (September–October 1996). ""Towards the Ideal Aircraft: The Life and Times of the Flying Wing, Part Two". Air Enthusiast. No. 65. pp. 8–19. ISSN 0143-5450.
