= Itoh Emi 2 =

1910s Japanese biplane aircraft

Emi 2

General information
- Type: single seat biplane
- National origin: Japan
- Manufacturer: Itoh Aeroplane Research Studio
- Designer: Otojiro Itoh
- Number built: 1

History
- First flight: 1917
- Retired: 1920
- Developed from: Itoh Emi 1

The Itoh Emi 2 was a revised and cleaned up development of his first aircraft, the Itoh Emi 1.

== Design and development ==
Itoh's Emi 1 was the second successful Japanese civil aircraft to fly. It made its first flight in November 1915 and by early 1917 Itoh had begun the design of a new aircraft. The Emin 2 owed much to its predecessor, both biplanes with wooden structures and fabric covering. Rectangular plan wings, shorter in span by 2.50 m (8.2 ft) and using a lower drag profile than before, were braced with pairs of parallel interplane struts, though the Emi 2, a two bay biplane, had one less bay on each side. The Emi 2's upper wing had a slightly greater span than the lower one, which had more rounded tips. The centre of the upper wing was supported over the fuselage by four parallel cabane struts. As on the Emi 1 there were ailerons, with chords which increased outwards, only on the upper wings.

The Emi 2 also inherited its predecessor's engine, the 26–34 kW (35–46 hp) Grégoire Gyp. The flat-side fuselage had an open cockpit for the pilot; a semi-circular cut-out in the upper trailing edge increased the pilot's upward field of view. The long span horizontal tail was roughly rectangular in plan and mounted on the upper fuselage and the vertical tail was also parallel-sided, though with a sloping top.

The Emi 2's wide track landing gear had two, rather than four wheels, each on a landing leg with bungee cord shock absorbers.

It flew for the first time in April 1917.

== Operational history ==
From May 1917 Itoh gave a series of demonstration flights from his east Inage Beach base, culminating in a visit to his home town of Osaka in September. His timing was fortunate, as his Inage Beach hangar was flattened by a typhoon-related tidal wave at the end of the month, while t Emi 2he was away. Demonstration flights resumed until the Emi 2 began use as a trainer from Itoh's new base at Tsudanuma Beach.

Its last operations were under new owners based near Hammamatsu. It was again used for demonstration flights, piloted by the inexperienced Asao Fikunaga around Osaka from August 1919. One flight took him to his home town of Toyonaka but the Emi 2 overturned on landing and was badly damaged. It was rapidly repaired but in May 1920, leaving Osaka, the aircraft hit a house roof, ending its career.

== Specifications ==
Data from Japanese Aircraft 1910-1941

General characteristics

- Crew: one
- Wingspan: 9 m (29 ft 6 in)
- Height: 2.25 m (7 ft 5 in)
- Wing area: 25 m^{2} (270 sq ft)
- Empty weight: 250 kg (551 lb)
- Powerplant: 1 × Grégoire Gyp four cylinder, water-cooled inline, 26–34 kW (35–45 hp)
- Propellers: 2-bladed

Performance

- Maximum speed: 85 km/h (53 mph, 46 kn)
