= SNCASE SE-2300 =

French two/three seat low wing, single engine touring aircraft

SE-2300
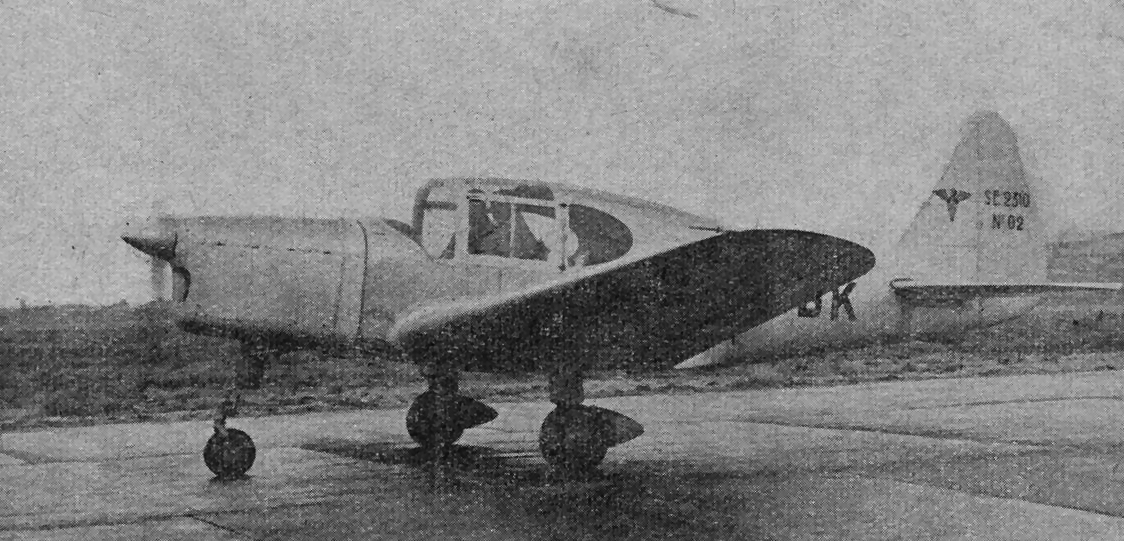
- SE-2310

General information
- Type: Two or three seat tourer
- National origin: France
- Manufacturer: Sud-Est (Société nationale des constructions aéronautiques du Sud-Est or SNCASE)
- Designer: Pierre Satre
- Number built: 3

History
- First flight: 26 October 1945

The Sud-Est SE-2300 or S.N.C.A.S.E. SE-2300 was a two/three seat low wing, single engine touring aircraft, built just after World War II in France. The SE-2310 was a tricycle undercarriage variant. Neither type went into production.

== Design and development ==
Pierre Satre, who later was chief designer of the Concorde, began the SE-2300 design during World War II and it first flew on 26 October 1945. It was a conventionally laid out, all metal, two seat, single engine cantilever monoplane, with tapered low wings having 4° of dihedral built around inverted U-section main and auxiliary spars. The wings had a centre section integral with the fuselage and two outer panels, all covered with electrically welded skin. There were plain flaps, with a maximum deflection of 40°.

The fuselage of the SE-2300 was constructed from four pre-formed panels welded together. A 140 hp (104 kW) Renault Bengali 4 four cylinder, inverted, air-cooled inline engine, fed from a fuselage tank, drove a two blade propeller. The over-wing cabin seated two side-by-side with dual controls. Behind these seats was space for a third (optional in the SE-2300 and standard in the SE-2310 variant) and baggage. There were access doors and rear view transparencies on both sides. At the rear, the tailplane was mounted at mid-fuselage and the fin and deep rudder were straight tapered except near the keel and almost triangular above the fuselage.

The first and only SE-2300 had a fixed conventional undercarriage with oleo-pneumatic springing, faired main legs and wheels and a swivelling tailwheel. The two SE-2310s had tricycle undercarriages, the first unfaired but the second with faired legs and spats.

== Operational history ==
With a four-seat version, the SE-2311 under development but unbuilt, the three seat SE-3010 was entered into a 1946 French Transport Ministry contest for a four-seat tourist aircraft in February 1946. It was not successful, the award going to the Nord 1200 Norécrin and development of the SE-2300 series was abandoned. The last example remained in use until at least 1956 as a company hack.

== Variants ==
SE-2300
Original version, two or three seats, conventional undercarriage.
SE-2310
Three seats, tricycle undercarriage. Two built, the second with faired undercarriage legs and wheels.
SE-2311
Three seat, 101 kW (135 hp) Regnier 4L-00 engine.

== Specifications (SE-2300) ==
Data from Jane's All the World's Aircraft 1948

General characteristics

- Capacity: Two or three
- Length: 7.40 m (24 ft 3 in)
- Wingspan: 10.13 m (33 ft 3 in)
- Height: 2.11 m (6 ft 11 in)
- Wing area: 15.0 m^{2} (161 sq ft)
- Empty weight: 685 kg (1,510 lb) equipped
- Gross weight: 1,015 kg (2,238 lb)
- Powerplant: 1 × Renault Bengali 4Pei 4-cylinder inverted air-cooled inline engine, 140 kW (190 hp) at 2,400 rpm
- Propellers: 2-bladed, 1.90 m (6 ft 3 in) diameter wooden

Performance

- Maximum speed: 235 km/h (146 mph, 127 kn)
- Cruise speed: 212 km/h (132 mph, 114 kn)
- Range: 900 km (560 mi, 490 nmi)
- Service ceiling: 4,650 m (15,260 ft)
- Wing loading: 67 kg/m^{2} (14 lb/sq ft)
- Power/mass: 0.10 kW/kg (0.063 hp/lb)
- Landing speed: 75 km/h (47 mph; 40 kn)
- Landing distance: 300 m (985 ft) from 8 m (26 ft) with flaps down
