= Moskalyev SAM-9 Strela =

One-off Soviet 1930s experimental aircraft

SAM-9
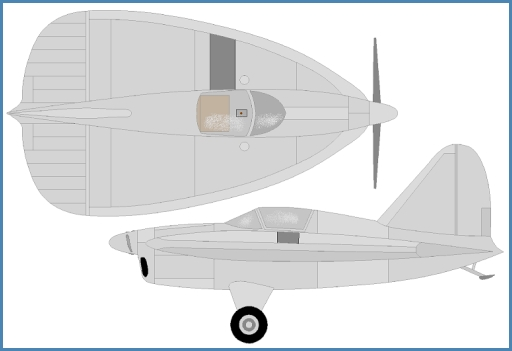

General information
- National origin: USSR
- Manufacturer: GAZ-18, Voronezh
- Designer: Aleksandr Sergeyevitch Moskalyev
- Number built: 1

History
- First flight: early 1937

The Moskalyev SAM-9 Strela (Arrow) was a one-off, Soviet, 1930s experimental tailless aircraft designed to test the characteristics of a leaf-shaped low-aspect-ratio delta wing.

== Design and development ==
As early as 1933, Aleksandr Moskalyev was designing a rocket-powered, tailless aircraft with a highly-swept short-span curved delta wing with wingtip fins and rudders, able to fly faster than sound. Because no sufficiently powerful engines were available at the time, the Moskalyev SAM-4 Sigma was never built but it led to two interim types, the SAM-7 Sigma and SAM-9 Strela.

The tailless Strela was built to test the behaviour of the SAM-4's radically new wing plan using a highly swept delta with moderately convex leading and trailing edges.

Set at shoulder height, the wing root ran from ahead of the engine to the extreme tail and was fitted with broad-chord elevons equipped with trim tabs. It had the unusually low aspect ratio of 0.925. Like the rest of the Strela, the wing structure was wood. Control surfaces were fabric covered but the rest of the Strela's skin was plywood. Moskalyev had intended to use a 570 kW (760 hp) Hispano-Suiza 12Y engine, but only a 200 kW (270 hp) Renault 6P was available. The Strela's enclosed cockpit was at about mid-chord with a fairing behind it reaching the large, triangular fin with a narrow chord rudder equipped with a trim tab. The Strela had a fixed conventional undercarriage, with cantilever faired legs based on those of the Moskalyev SAM-5 and a sprung tailskid.

It was first flown, at Voronezh, in early 1937 by A.N.Rybo. A.N.Gusarov and A.P.Chernavskii explored its characteristics over the next few months, finding it controllable but demanding. The high landing angle of attack (around 20°) typical of delta wing aircraft was not yet familiar but worrying. In mid-1937 development of the SAM-9 was ended.

== Specifications ==
Data from Osprey Encyclopedia of Russian Aircraft 1875-1995

General characteristics

- Crew: one
- Length: 6.15 m (20 ft 2 in)
- Wingspan: 3.55 m (11 ft 8 in)
- Wing area: 13.0 m^{2} (140 sq ft)
- Aspect ratio: 0.975
- Airfoil: modified RAF 38
- Empty weight: 470 kg (1,036 lb)
- Gross weight: 630 kg (1,389 lb)
- Powerplant: 1 × Voronezh MV-6 inverted 6-cylinder inline, 200 kW (270 hp) (licence-built Renault 6P)
- Propellers: 2-bladed fixed-pitch propeller

Performance

- Maximum speed: 310 km/h (190 mph, 170 kn) maximum achieved at sea level
- Service ceiling: 1,500 m (4,900 ft) maximum achieved
- Take-off run: 200 m (660 ft)
- Landing run 100 m (330 ft)
- Landing speed: 102 km/h (63 mph; 55 kn)
