= Caudron C.480 Frégate =

C.480 Frégate

General information
- Type: Touring cabin monoplane
- National origin: France
- Manufacturer: Caudron
- Designer: Maurice Devlieger
- Primary user: French Air Force
- Number built: 27

History
- First flight: 1935
- Developed from: Caudron C.280

The Caudron C.480 Frégate was a French three-seat touring monoplane designed by Maurice Devlieger and built by Société des avions Caudron.

== Development ==
Based on the earlier Caudron C.280 the Frégate was a high-wing braced monoplane with an enclosed cabin for the pilot with two side-by-seats behind for passengers. Powered by a front-mounted 140 hp (104 kW) Renault 4Pei inline piston engine it had a tailwheel landing gear. The company built 27 Frégates, in 1939, 20 were requisitioned into service with the French Air Force for liaison work.

== Operators ==
France

- French Air Force

== Specifications ==
Data from

General characteristics

- Crew: 1
- Capacity: 2
- Length: 8.18 m (26 ft 10 in)
- Wingspan: 11.90 m (39 ft 1 in)
- Height: 2.12 m (6 ft 11 in)
- Wing area: 20.00 m^{2} (215.3 sq ft)
- Empty weight: 600 kg (1,323 lb) equipped
- Max takeoff weight: 1,050 kg (2,315 lb)
- Powerplant: 1 × Renault 4Pei inline piston engine, 100 kW (140 hp)

Performance

- Maximum speed: 210 km/h (130 mph, 110 kn)
- Cruise speed: 185 km/h (115 mph, 100 kn)
- Range: 850 km (530 mi, 460 nmi)
- Service ceiling: 4,500 m (14,800 ft)

== See also ==
Related lists

- List of aircraft of World War II
