= Renault 438 =

438
- Type: 6-cylinder inverted in-line piston engine
- National origin: France
- Manufacturer: Renault
- Developed from: Renault 6P

The Renault 438, a.k.a. Coupe Deutsch 1934 was a specially developed racing engine, designed and built in France, for use in aircraft competing in the Coupe Deutsch de la Meurthe aircraft races.

== Design and development ==
Following closely the developments with the 6P and 6Q, the 438 married a turbo-supercharger with narrow bore high compression cylinders and the crankcase design of the 6Q

== Operational history ==
Only two aircraft types, both one-offs, are known to have used the 438 engine. One was F-AMVA, a Caudron C.430/1 Rafale, for racing and record attempts, particularly the Coupe Deutsch de la Meurthe races, the other Hanriot H.183 F-AOJG, an aerobatic version of the Hanriot H.180.

== Applications ==
- Caudron C.430/1 Rafale
- Hanriot H.183

== Specifications (438) ==
Data from Renault 1907-1934:27 Ans d'Aviation

=== General characteristics ===
- Type: Turbo-supercharged 6-cylinder inverted, air-cooled in-line piston engine
- Bore: 109.75 mm (4.32 in)
- Stroke: 140 mm (5.51 in)
- Displacement: 7.95 L (485.14 cu in)

=== Components ===
- Valvetrain: push-rod operated inlet and exhaust poppet valves
- Turbocharger: Renault centrifugal compressor running at 26,000 rpm
- Fuel system: 1x Stromberg carburretor
- Cooling system: air-cooled
- Two-bladed, two-position variable-pitch Ratier propeller.

=== Performance ===
- Power output: 130 kW (180 hp)
