= Caudron C.510 Pélican =

1930s French monoplane

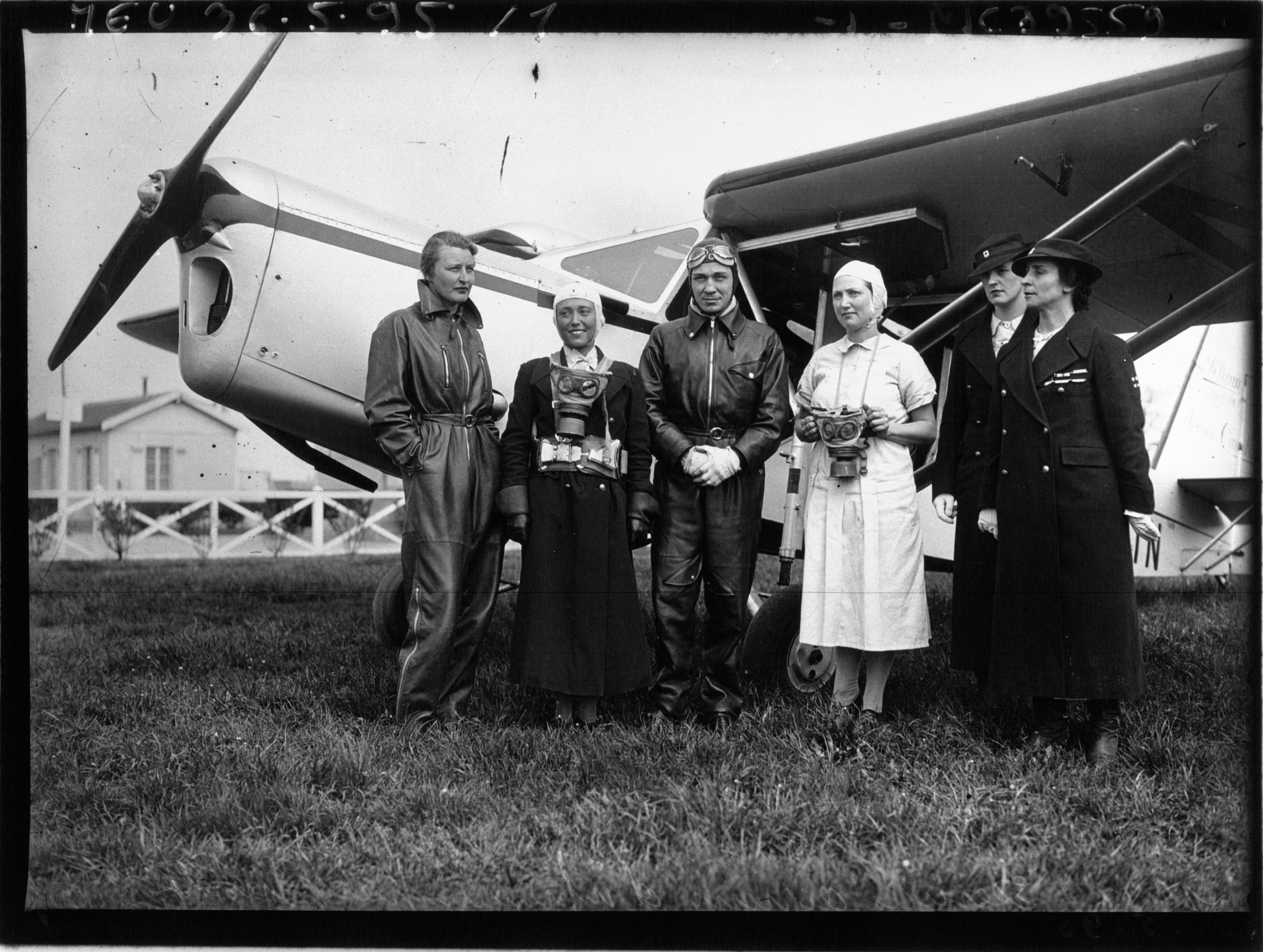
- French nurses with a C.510, in 1936.

General information
- Type: Air ambulance or touring monoplane
- National origin: France
- Manufacturer: Caudron
- Number built: 62

History
- First flight: 1934
- Developed from: C.282/8

The Caudron C.510 Pélican was a 1930s French air ambulance or touring monoplane. Designed and built by Caudron and based on the earlier Caudron C.282/8.

== Development ==
To create room for a stretcher and attendant the earlier Caudron C.282/8 design was modified with a lengthened fuselage, an improved wing and tailplane design. A single-engined high-wing monoplane, the Pélican had a conventional landing gear. As a touring aircraft the Pélican could carry three passengers and a total of 62 were built as both air ambulances and tourers.

== Operators ==
Belgian Congo

- Force Publique

France

- French Air Force

== Specifications (Ambulance) ==
Data from

General characteristics

- Crew: 1
- Capacity: 2 (Stretcher and attendant)
- Length: 8.52 m (27 ft 11 in)
- Wingspan: 11.82 m (38 ft 9 in)
- Wing area: 23.75 m^{2} (255.6 sq ft)
- Empty weight: 626 kg (1,380 lb)
- Max takeoff weight: 1,140 kg (2,513 lb)
- Powerplant: 1 × Renault 4Pei Bengali Junior inline piston engine, 100 kW (140 hp)

Performance

- Maximum speed: 185 km/h (115 mph, 100 kn)
- Cruise speed: 165 km/h (103 mph, 89 kn)
- Range: 1,000 km (620 mi, 540 nmi)

== Bibliography ==
- Hauet, André (November 2001). "Courrier des Lecteurs" [Readers' Letters]. Avions: Toute l'Aéronautique et son histoire (in French) (104): 2. ISSN 1243-8650.
- The Illustrated Encyclopedia of Aircraft (Part Work 1982-1985). Orbis Publishing.
