= Caudron C.530 Rafale =

C.530 Rafale

General information
- Type: Two seat racing and sports aircraft
- National origin: France
- Manufacturer: Société des Avions Caudron
- Designer: Marcel Riffard
- Number built: 7

History
- First flight: early 1934

The Caudron C.530 Rafale (English: Gust) was a French two seat competition aircraft. Only seven were built but they had great success in several contests during 1934.

== Design and development ==
The C.530 was a low wing cantilever monoplane, wood framed and fabric covered, with a good deal in common with its predecessor and namesake, the Caudron C.430 Rafale, though with a lower wing loading. Its wing was tapered, round tipped and carried split flaps. Its fuselage was flat sided, with a deep, rounded decking running the full length. It had an air cooled 113 kW (152 hp) Renault Bengali Junior inverted four cylinder inline engine in the nose, driving a two blade, variable pitch propeller. This engine was a version of the Renault 4P with its compression increased to 6:1 and running at the higher speed of 2,450 rpm. The Rafale's two seats were in tandem, one over the wing and the other just behind the trailing edge, under a long (about a third of the fuselage length), narrow multi-framed canopy with a blunt, vertical windscreen and sliding access. Behind the canopy a long fairing continued its profile to the straight tapered, round tipped vertical tail. The horizontal tail was mounted largely ahead of the fin on the top of the fuselage.

The Rafale had a fixed wide track, tailskid undercarriage. Its wheels were on vertical, slender aerofoil section legs from the wings and were largely enclosed within magnesium alloy fairings.

The date of the first flight is not certain but it was certainly flying by 7 June 1934, possibly for the first time. Another six examples built were registered soon after.

== Operational history ==
The C.530 Rafale was intended as a competition aircraft and in 1934 it was very successful. On 8 July Rafales took the first three places in the Angers 12 hour event and later that month filled the top six Esders Cup positions. Late in August, one won the Zénith Cup with a flight over the prescribed 1,578 km (981 mi) course at 240 km/h (149.1 mph).

In 1935 two of the C.530s were converted into C.660 Rafales, powered by Renault 134 kW (180 hp) six cylinder inverted inline engines. One of these won that year's Angers 12 hour event.

== Specifications ==
Data from Le Génie Civil December 1934

General characteristics

- Crew: Two
- Length: 7.50 m (24 ft 7 in)
- Wingspan: 9.2 m (30 ft 2 in)
- Height: 1.90 m (6 ft 3 in)
- Wing area: 12.0 m^{2} (129 sq ft)
- Empty weight: 546 kg (1,204 lb)
- Gross weight: 900 kg (1,984 lb)
- Powerplant: 1 × Renault Bengali Sport 4 cylinder, air cooled, inverted inline, 113 kW (152 hp)
- Propellers: 2-bladed Ratier, automatic variable pitch, adjustable in flight

Performance

- Maximum speed: 300 km/h (190 mph, 160 kn) at sea level
- Cruise speed: 265 km/h (165 mph, 143 kn) economical
- Range: 1,300 km (810 mi, 700 nmi)
- Service ceiling: 6,250 m (20,510 ft)
- Take-off: in 160 m (525 ft), at less than 90 km/h (56 mph)
