= Bodiansky 20 =

General information
- Type: Four-seat tourer
- National origin: France
- Number built: 1

History
- First flight: 6 July 1931

The Bodiansky 20, a French four-seat touring aircraft flown in the early 1930s, was one of the first French aircraft to adopt Handley Page slots to delay the stall and lower landing speed.

== Design and development ==
Though the Handley Page H.P.20 had demonstrated the efficacy of leading edge slots used in coordination with flaps in delaying the onset of stall at high angles of attack in 1921, they were only adopted slowly across Europe. The Handley Page Gugnunc of 1929 had two groups of slots, one which opened with the flaps and the other automatically opened by air pressure changes as the stall approached. The Bodiansky 20 was one of the first French aircraft to use this system. It was also the first French aircraft to have a welded steel tube fuselage structure, made in the factory of the aircraft constructor S. Poite.

The cantilever wing of the Bodiansky 20 was built in three parts, with a short-span, thick, rectangular plan central section and nearly triangular plan outer panels which carried 8° of dihedral and thinned linearly outwards. The aspect ratio of the wing, 10.9, was high. Structurally the central section was a welded steel tube part of the fuselage and the outer panels were wooden, each with two spars and plywood skinned. Slats, which opened to form the slots, filled the whole leading edges of the outer panels and were divided into two sections. These sections matched the division of the trailing edge into ailerons outboard and flaps inboard. The outer slots opened automatically on the approach of the stall, whereas the inboard slats deployed when the flaps were lowered to their single down setting.

It was powered by a nose-mounted, 75 kW (100 hp) Renault 4Pb, a four-cylinder, air-cooled, upright inline engine, though its mountings, part of the tubular fuselage structure, could accept engines with powers in the range 60–112 kW (80–150 hp). The exhaust was fitted with a silencer and its outlet was aft of the cabin. Fuel was held in two tanks in the wing centre-section and oil in the fuselage aft of the engine firewall. Its enclosed cabin, entered via centrally hinged, multi-part glazing, had two forward seats, equipped with dual controls, and a rear bench seat. It was normally flown from the left-hand seat, where the rudder bar was fitted with brake pedals. The flap lever was placed centrally. The fuselage was fabric covered apart from the engine area and the sloping fuselage roof and upper part aft of the cabin, which was covered with electron metal sheet.

The tail of the Bodiansky 20 was conventional, with a small, triangular, in-flight adjustable tailplane mounted at the top of the fuselage frame. It carried generous, aerodynamically balanced elevators with a semi-elliptical trailing edge and was fitted with ground-adjustable trim tabs. The vertical tail was similar in profile and design to the horizontal surfaces; the rudder extended to the keel and worked in a deep elevator cut-out. Structurally these surfaces were steel tube framed and fabric covered.

It had fixed tailwheel landing gear with a track of 2.4 m (7 ft 10 in). The mainwheels, equipped with brakes, were independently mounted on bent axles hinged from the central fuselage and restrained by drag struts from the forward lower fuselage frames. Each wheel had a short, vertical oleo strut from the forward part of the outer end of the wing centre-section. The tailwheel castored and was sprung and damped with rubber rings.

The Bodiansky 2 first flew on 6 July 1931. Only one, registered F-ALZB, was built and its subsequent history in unknown.

== Specifications ==
Data from Les Ailes, July 1931

General characteristics

- Crew: One
- Capacity: Three passengers
- Length: 7.465 m (24 ft 6 in)
- Wingspan: 12.80 m (42 ft 0 in)
- Height: 2.45 m (8 ft 0 in)
- Wing area: 15 m^{2} (160 sq ft)
- Aspect ratio: 10.9
- Empty weight: 500 kg (1,102 lb) equipped
- Max takeoff weight: 1,000 kg (2,205 lb)
- Powerplant: 1 × Renault 4Pb 4-cylinder, air-cooled, upright inline, 75 kW (100 hp)
- Propellers: 2-bladed Levasseur, 2.20 m (7 ft 3 in) diameter metal

Performance

- Maximum speed: 180 km/h (110 mph, 97 kn)
- Range: 800–900 km (500–560 mi, 430–490 nmi)
- Service ceiling: 5,000 m (16,000 ft)
- Landing speed: 65 km/h (40 mph; 35 kn)
