= Morane-Saulnier MS.350 =

French aerobatic trainer flown in 1936

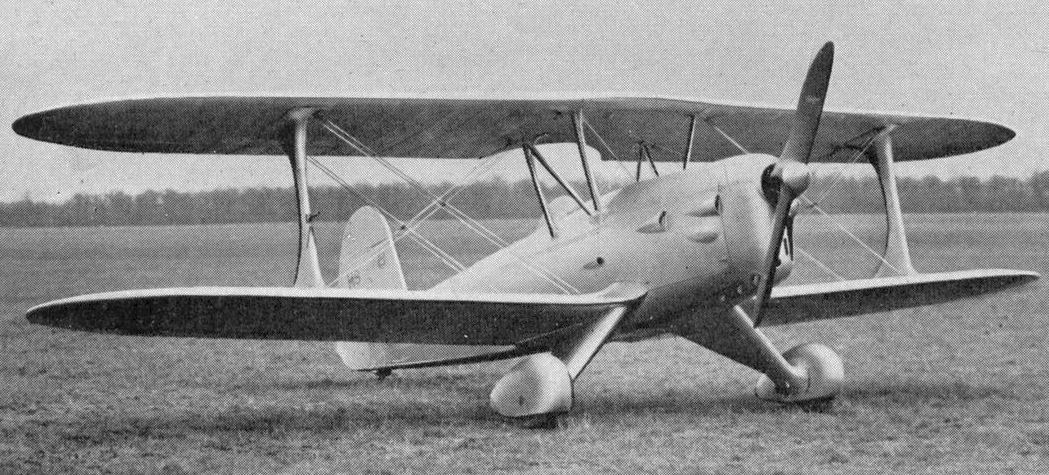

General information
- Type: aerobatic trainer
- National origin: France
- Manufacturer: Morane-Saulnier
- Number built: 1

History
- First flight: 8 February 1936

The Morane-Saulnier MS.350 was a French aerobatic trainer flown in 1936. Only one was built but it had a long career, flying post-war until the 1960s.

== Design ==
The MS.350 was a two bay biplane with equal span wings. In plan these were straight tapered, with sweep only on the leading edge, and with elliptical tips. Only the lower wing had dihedral. Both upper and lower wings were built around two duralumin box-spars, joined together on each side by a single, faired, broad-footed interplane strut to a steel cross-link between the spars. There were ailerons on both upper and lower wings. A pair of outward leaning, N-form cabane struts braced the upper wing centre section high over the fuselage. The usual wire bracing completed the wing structure.

The trainer was powered by a neatly cowled, 180 kW (240 hp) Renault 6Pei 6-cylinder inverted air-cooled inline engine. The fuselage was constructed around four duralumin tube longerons with metal skinning from engine to cockpit and fabric covered behind. Its open cockpit was just behind the trailing edge of the upper wing, where there was a semicircular cutout to improve the pilot's upward field of view. Behind his seat there was a 0.15 m^{3} (5.3 cu ft) storage locker.

The horizontal tail was essentially trapezoidal in plan and included balanced elevators which had a nick for operation of a balanced rudder. The fin was trapezoidal in profile and the rudder straight-edged, though with a rounded top. It extended to the keel. The tail surfaces were fabric covered metal structures.

The MS.350 had a fixed tailskid undercarriage with a track of 2.50 m (8 ft 2 in). Each mainwheel was mounted on a steel tube leg hinged on the lower fuselage longeron. Together with an oleo strut, each leg was enclosed in a fairing; the wheels also had fairings and were fitted with brakes. The tailskid was steerable.

== Development ==
The MS.350 made its first flight on 8 February 1936, piloted by Michel Détroyat, who was a well known aerobatic pilot. He demonstrated it in public on 17 May at a meeting in Saint-Germain, Paris. Its development was protracted, lasting until October 1937. At some early stage the original engine was replaced by a Renault 6Q, a rather similar 6-cylinder inverted air-cooled inline engine producing 164 kW (220 hp).

== Operational history ==
Détroyat's outstanding aerobatic displays across pre-war Europe made the MS.350 well known. It survived the war and was registered as F-BDYL in 1954 in the name of Jean Cliquet, Morane-Saulnier's chief test pilot, and based at Ossun. From 1956 it was owned by Morane-Saulnier and flew from their base at Villacoubly until it was wrecked in Italy on 8 December 1964.

== Specifications ==
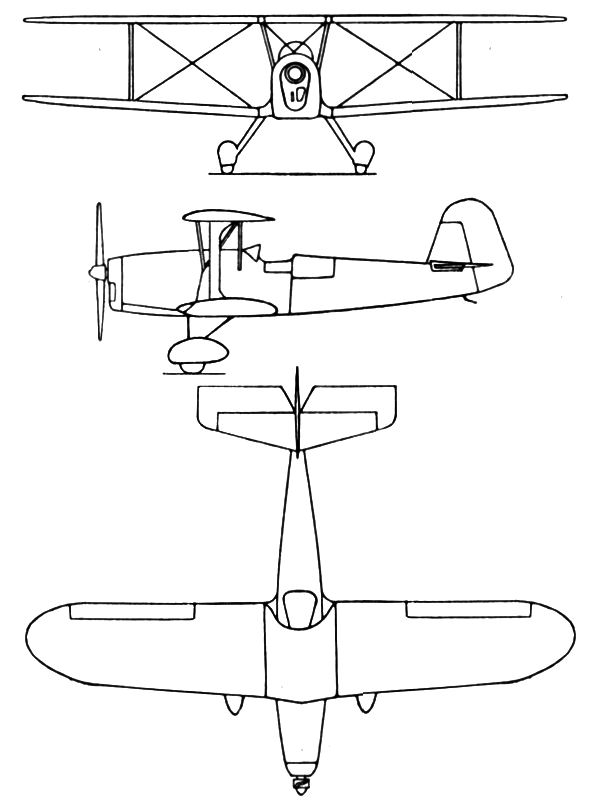
Morane Saulnier MS.350 3-view drawing from L'Aerophile July 1936

Data from Les Ailes 14 May 1936; performance: l'Année Aéronautique 1935-6 p.20.

General characteristics

- Crew: One
- Length: 6.45 m (21 ft 2 in)
- Wingspan: 8.40 m (27 ft 7 in)
- Height: 2.25 m (7 ft 5 in)
- Wing area: 19.50 m^{2} (209.9 sq ft)
- Empty weight: 720 kg (1,587 lb)
- Gross weight: 850 kg (1,874 lb) for aerobatics, 950 kg (2,090 lb) for cross-country flights
- Fuel capacity: 159 L (35 imp gal; 42 US gal) in upper wing and fuselage tanks
- Powerplant: 1 × Renault 6Pei 6-cylinder inverted air-cooled inline, 180 kW (240 hp) equivalent
- Propellers: 2-bladed, 2.0 m (6 ft 7 in) diameter

Performance

- Maximum speed: 255 km/h (158 mph, 138 kn) at ground level
- Cruise speed: 230 km/h (140 mph, 120 kn) at 150 kW (200 hp)
- Range: 700 km (430 mi, 380 nmi)
- Service ceiling: 7,800 m (25,600 ft) absolute
- Time to altitude: 5m 16s to 2,000 m (6,600 ft)
- Landing speed: 75 km/h (47 mph; 40 kn)

== Bibliography ==
- Cortet, Pierre (October 2000). "Le Morane-Saulnier MS 350" [The Morane-Saulnier MS 350]. Avions: Toute l'Aéronautique et son histoire (in French) (91): 48–53. ISSN 1243-8650.
