= Guillemin JG.10 =

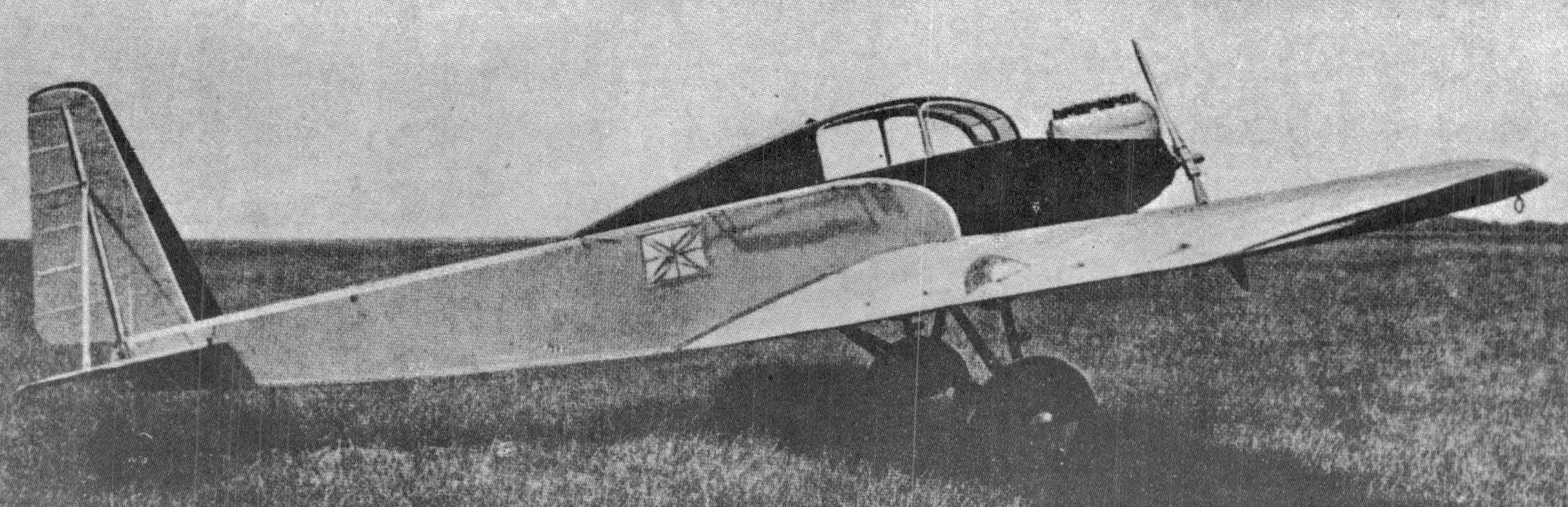
- Guillemin JG.10 with enclosed cockpit

General information
- Type: Two-seat tourer
- National origin: France
- Manufacturer: Blériot Aéronautique
- Designer: J. Guillemin
- Number built: 1

History
- First flight: 1 June 1931

The Guillemin JG.10 or Blériot-Guillemin JG.10 was a French two seat touring aircraft, designed to be as simple and safe to fly and maintain as a car, with similar facilities, as well as provision for parachutes.

== Design ==
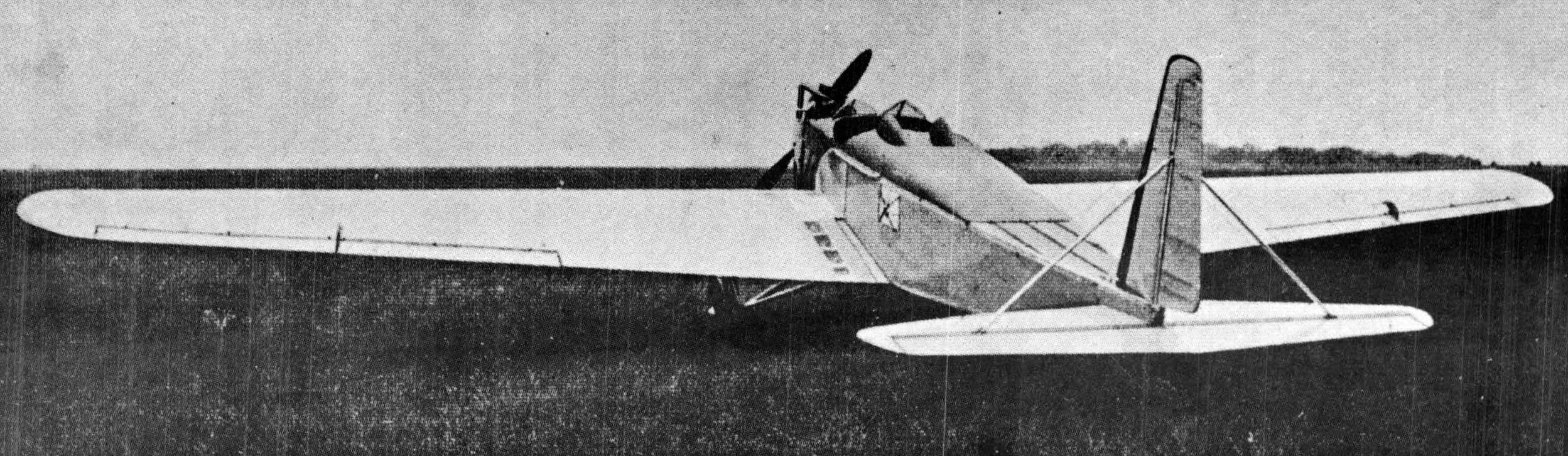
Guillemin JG.10 with sport cockpit photo from NACA aircraft Circular No.153

The Guillemin JG.10 was a cantilever low wing monoplane with foldable wings and side-by-side seats in an open cockpit which could be rapidly transformed into an enclosed cabin. It was built at the Blériot factory and was often referred to as the Blériot-Guillemin JG.10.

Beyond a metal framed centre-section the wings were all wood, built around twin box spars and plywood covered. They were trapezoidal in plan out to rounded tips, with long, narrow-chord ailerons each divided into two sections. The wings had about 3.5° of dihedral, partly achieved by airfoil section thinning outboard. The wing centre-section was widest from leading edge to around the forward spar, then angled inwards in plan until it almost reached the fuselage edge, following it to the trailing edge. The outer wings were folded in two stages, first rotating them around a pivot on the forward spar until the trailing edge was upright, then hinging the wings back along the side of the fuselage.

The JG.10 was powered by a 71 kW (95 hp) four-cylinder, upright, air-cooled inline Renault 4P engine, largely exposed, in the nose. Though a Salmson 7A radial engine of the same power was an alternative, there is no evidence that it was fitted. Behind the rubber-mounted engine frame, the fuselage had rectangular sections, widest in the cockpit area. It was built around a frame of square section tubes, with a light metal skin; the tubes had the same outer dimensions everywhere but their wall thicknesses increased where greater strength was required.

The cockpit located the two seats over mid-chord. In sports mode the JG.10 was flown from an open cockpit with a triplex windscreen for each occupant but it could also be configured as a tourer by attaching a glazed and streamlined, rectangular section top. Access to the latter was from above. There were removable dual controls and each seat could be folded down to provide a clear surface for an air bed. Luggage could be stored behind the seats in a netted-off space. Each occupant was provided with a parachute stored in cockpit side-pockets and which exited through the sides, pulled by a static line attached to the wearer's harness.

All the tail surfaces of the JG.10 were straight tapered with rounded tips and carried unbalanced control surfaces. The tailplane, which had a wooden structure and was ply covered, was built into the fuselage and strut-braced to the fin. The elevators were fabric covered. The high aspect ratio vertical tail comprised a fin, constructed like the tailplane and an all-metal rudder which ended above the elevators.

The JG.10 had fixed, conventional landing gear, its mainwheels on bent axles with rearward drag struts, all hinged to the central fuselage underside. Vertical oleo struts from the ends of the axles were attached to the forward wing spars; the track was 3.0 m (120 in). A vertical tube extending from the extreme rear of the fuselage carried a small castering tailwheel below a shock-absorbing spring. The end of the extension was supported by a small V-strut to the lower fuselage.

== Development ==
The first flight of the Guillemin JG.10 was on 1 June 1931. In August it was being developed at Villacoublay whilst also serving as Louis Blériot's transport in the neighbourhood of Paris. In October it took part in the Concours National d'Avions de Tourisme (National touring aircraft competition), which began at Orly in late September, but had to retire with fuel flow problems.

The sole JG.10 remained active for six years. It was demonstrated at a civilian pilots' reunion festival at Orly in May 1932 and was back at Villacoublay (with the STIAé) in December, where it remained until at least May 1934. In August 1935 it was there once again, test-flying at the Centre d'Essais de Matériels Aériens, Villacoublay.

It was destroyed in a fatal accident at Villacoublay on 16 June 1937; both crew died. The cause was inflight structural failure which was ascribed to weathering in an aircraft that had been housed for two years at Buc in a hangar partially open to the elements.

== Specifications ==
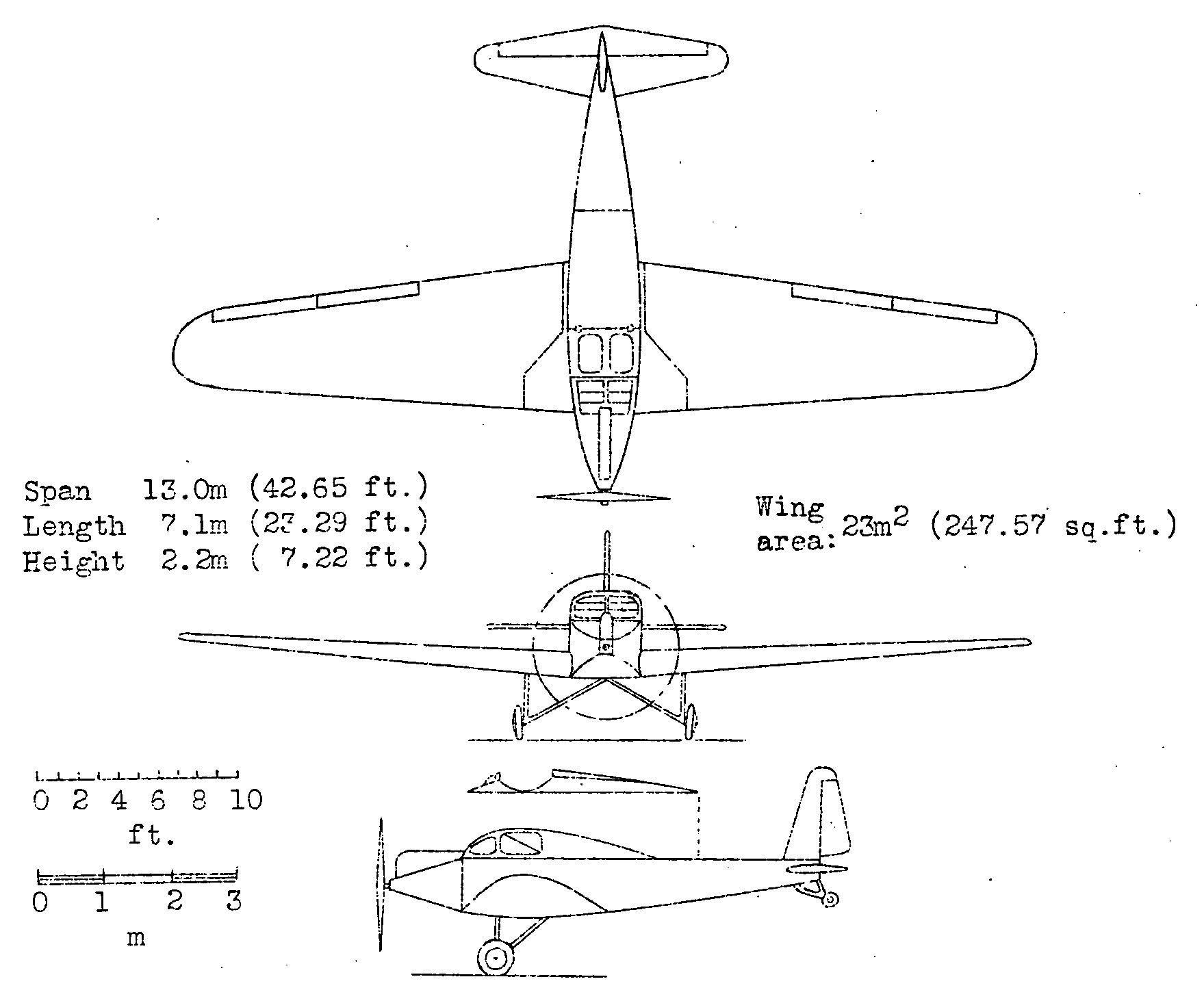
Guillemin JG.10 3-view drawing from NACA aircraft Circular No.153

Data from Performance estimated.

General characteristics

- Crew: Two
- Length: 7.10 m (23 ft 4 in)
- Wingspan: 13.00 m (42 ft 8 in)
- Height: 2.20 m (7 ft 3 in)
- Wing area: 23 m^{2} (250 sq ft)
- Empty weight: 554 kg (1,221 lb) equipped
- Gross weight: 850 kg (1,874 lb)
- Fuel capacity: 130 L (29 imp gal; 34 US gal)
- Powerplant: 1 × Renault 4Pb air-cooled 4-cylinder inline, 71 kW (95 hp)

Performance

- Maximum speed: 160 km/h (99 mph, 86 kn) at sea level
- Range: 500 km (310 mi, 270 nmi)
- Service ceiling: 4,500 m (14,800 ft)
- Maximum glide ratio: 8
