= Moskalyev SAM-14 =

SAM-14
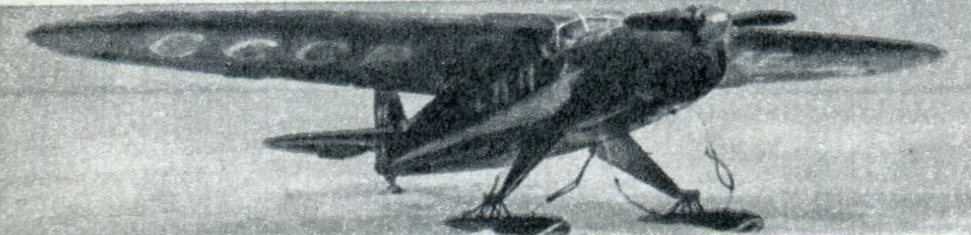

General information
- Type: Utility transport
- National origin: USSR
- Manufacturer: GAZ-18,Voronezh
- Designer: Aleksandr Sergeyevitch Moskalyev

History
- First flight: 1939

The Moskalyev SAM-14 was a late 1930s Soviet, five-passenger transport, one of a series of developments of the successful Moskalyev SAM-5.

== Design and development ==
The single engine, high wing Moskalyev SAM-5bis-2 was a 1934 light transport developed into four different types, of which the SAM-14 was the penultimate. Apart from having a more powerful, inline engine, it was similar to the original.

It had the same high-set two spar, cantilever wing as the SAM-5bis-2, with ply-skin ahead of the forward spar forming a torsion resistant box. The whole surface, including the ply-skinned leading edge, was fabric covered. The SAM-14's wings had Kalman flaps.

It was powered by a nose-mounted 110 kW (150 hp) Voronezh MV-4 4-cylinder, air-cooled, inverted inline, a licence-built Renault 4Pei engine. The fuselage had a wooden girder structure and was plywood-covered forward of the rear of the cabin, under the trailing edge, and fabric covered aft. The pilot's enclosed cockpit was ahead of the wing leading edge and its five-place passenger cabin was behind him under the wing, with three windows on each side and two port side doors. Behind the cabin the fuselage was fabric covered, narrowing to the SAM-5bis-2-style tail, with a blunted triangular fin and more rounded rudder. A triangular plan tailplane was mounted on top of the fuselage and carried rounded, tabbed elevators, separated for rudder movement.

The SAM-14 had wide-splayed cantilever landing gear, each side with a landing leg and drag strut within a common fairing. The few photographs show it on short main skis and a tail ski.

== Operational history ==
The date of the SAM-14's first flight is not known but official testing began in November 1939 and continued until June 1940. Production was initially approved but then cancelled by higher authority.

== Specifications ==
Data from The Osprey Encyclopedia of Russian Aircraft 1875-1995

General characteristics

- Crew: one
- Capacity: five passengers
- Length: 8.06 m (26 ft 5 in)
- Wingspan: 11.49 m (37 ft 8 in)
- Wing area: 21.86 m^{2} (235.3 sq ft)
- Airfoil: R-II
- Empty weight: 795 kg (1,753 lb)
- Gross weight: 1,280 kg (2,822 lb)
- Powerplant: 1 × Voronezh MV-4 4-cylinder inverted, air-cooled, 110 kW (150 hp) (Renault 4Pei built under licence)
- Propellers: 2-bladed

Performance

- Maximum speed: 196 km/h (122 mph, 106 kn) at sea level
- Range: 550 km (340 mi, 300 nmi)
- Service ceiling: 3,360 m (11,020 ft)
- Take-off distance: 240 m (790 ft)
- Landing distance and speed with flaps extended: 190 m (620 ft) at 68 km/h (42 mph; 37 kn)
