= Caudron P.V. 200 =

P.V. 200

General information
- Type: Amphibious floatplane
- National origin: France
- Manufacturer: Caudron
- Designer: Pierre de Viscaya
- Number built: 1

The Caudron P.V. 200 was an all-metal French amphibious floatplane designed and built by the French aircraft manufacturer Caudron. Only a single prototype was ever completed.

== Design and development ==
The P.V. 200 was a cantilever monoplane amphibious floatplane equipped with foldable wings and dual flight controls. The entirety of the aircraft was composed of metal, including the covering of both the wing and empennage. An aluminium alloy, L2R, was used, while the principal fittings contained rust-proof steel that had a relatively high chromium content. Benefits from this construction included far greater rigidity than could be achieved by conventional fabric-covered construction, a hardy exterior that could withstand most weather conditions and even do without a hangar for a time, and the minimising of deformations and accidental breaches via a large level of connections. In contrast to the materials used, the design team aimed to simplify construction wherever it was reasonable to do so in order to reduce the cost. This led to the use of open channels that facilitated riveting and maximising the use of panelling and simple forms.

The wing comprised three sections, one being a central section that was relatively uniform, rested on the fuselage and supported the engine-propeller group, while the other two lateral sections featured an evolving profile, could be easily removed, and were furnished with ailerons. At the pilot’s direction, a specialised device was present to lower the ailerons for the purpose of increasing the camber of the wing by displacing the axis of the control. All three sections, which consisted of a leading edge, a central box and a trailing edge, were assembled using readily accessible ball joints.

The aircraft was fitted with a rectangular elevated-type horizontal empennage that consisted of two halves, one set on either side of the vertical empennage. Each half comprises a fixed element, which was braced by an oblique strut, and a corresponding movable element; the angle of attack of the fixed element could be adjusted while on the ground. The horizontal empennage was constructed in a similar manner to the wing, comprising a leading edge, central box and trailing edge. The elevator hinges used ball bearings. The construction of the vertical empennage is similar to that of the horizontal empennage, but lacked any external bracing. The fuselage consisted of four longerons that were joined at key angles. The section which supported the wing had a large section frame that ran parallel to the principal spar of the wing. Furthermore, a pair of secondary frames were located in front of the leading edge and in line with the rear wing spar, thus constituting the principal structure of the fuselage.

Access to the cabin was obtained by opening the downwards-facing doors that faced the floats. To facilitate emergency egress (e.g. bailing out), a special device was present to open these same doors from inside of the cabin. The passenger cabin was located within the fuselage section directly forward of the principal frame. This cabin was relatively comfortably furnished and featured glass windows and sufficient room for two abreast seating.

It was powered by a single Renault 4P inline piston engine that drove a metal twin-bladed pusher propeller. Capable of producing up to 120hp, this engine was contained within a straight-sided nacelle that was positioned above the aircraft’s wing; this arrangement provided several benefits. In addition to protecting both the engine and propellers from sea spray, it also achieved improved comfort levels inside of the aircraft via a reduction in noise and the elimination of oil and fuel odors. Furthermore, the configuration brought safety benefits, the fire hazard posed being reportedly lowered to negligible levels.

The engine nacelle itself consisted of a box formed from vertical panels of thin metal and was supported by a horizontal plate with an opening for holding the engine. A special device that was particularly resistant to both torsion and flexing, was provided for supporting the rear bearing of the propeller shaft. The engine cowling was made of thin alloy metal that was internally reinforced; the movable parts were assembled by pins and hinges. A tubular steel shaft was used to transfer power to the propeller from the engine via an elastic coupling. The fuel tanks were located within the central section of the wing on each either side of the fuselage; they could be rapidly emptied mid-flight. Fuel was supplied to the engine via an automated pump. The engine controls were rigid; a crank was present for hand-starting it.

For alighting on the water, the undercarriage consisted of a pair of catamaran-style floats. Composed of metal, these floats had shock-absorbing undersides, a reserve buoyancy of 90 per cent and a total displacement of 930 liters (2,050 pounds). Internally, each float was divided into seven water-tight compartments, each one having an inspection hatch on the upper surface. Furthermore, their design accommodated the installation of wheels for landing upon dry ground; this apparatus consisted of two independent wheels, each of which being mounted on a fork that was hinged to one of the float's bulkhead that worked to close off the bottom of the float while the wheel was retracted. Each wheel was connected with the oleo-pneumatic shock absorber via a movable fork while the opposite end of the shock absorber was attached to a runner comprising a nut with two triangular threads and guided by two steel rings. The control gear was arranged in such a manner that the wheels could be lowered relatively quickly. The landing gear also incorporated a tail wheel that was furnished with a balloon tyre and mounted on a swiveling fork.

== Specifications (variant specified) ==
Data from Caudron P.V. 200: un drôle d'amphibie, ou un petit tour et puis s'en va... , National Advisory Committee for Aeronautics

General characteristics

- Crew: 2
- Length: 8.07 m (26 ft 6 in)
- Wingspan: 13 m (42 ft 8 in)
- Height: 3.75 m (12 ft 4 in)
- Wing area: 18 m^{2} (190 sq ft)
- Empty weight: 743 kg (1,638 lb) (equipped)
- Gross weight: 930 kg (2,050 lb)
- Max takeoff weight: 1,017 kg (2,242 lb)
- Powerplant: 1 × Renault 4P four-cylinder inline piston engine, 89 kW (120 hp)
- Propellers: 2-bladed

Performance

- Maximum speed: 185 km/h (115 mph, 100 kn)
- Cruise speed: 142 km/h (88 mph, 77 kn)
- Minimum control speed: 80 km/h (50 mph, 43 kn)
- Range: 450 km (280 mi, 240 nmi)
- Service ceiling: 5,000 m (16,000 ft)
