= Moskalyev SAM-10 =

Soviet light transport aircraft

SAM-10

General information
- Type: 5/6 seat light transport or ambulance
- National origin: USSR
- Manufacturer: GAZ-18,Voronezh
- Designer: Aleksandr Sergeyevitch Moskalyev
- Number built: 1 SAM-10, 2 SAM-10bis

History
- First flight: Summer 1938
- Developed from: Moskalyev SAM-5bis-2

The Moskalyev SAM-10 was a late 1930s Soviet light transport aircraft suited to passenger or ambulance roles. Despite proving outstanding in trials, engine supply curtailed its production.

== Design and development ==
The low-wing Moskalyev SAM-10 was a development of the wooden, high cantilever wing SAM-5bis-2. Its wings, as well as the rear fuselage and tail, were originally built for the SAM-5bis-2. They had twin spars with plywood skin around the leading edge and fabric covering aft.

The SAM-10 was powered by a 220 kW (300 hp) Bessonov MM-1, a six cylinder. air-cooled, inverted inline engine, though its unobtainability led to the SAM-10bis, fitted instead with a 200 kW (270 hp) Voronezh MV-6, a similar six cylinder engine. The engine cowling was light alloy, as were the cabin roof frames, but the rest of the fuselage had a wooden structure, the forward part covered with ply and the rest with fabric. At the rear, the fin was triangular, carrying a narrower, round-tipped rudder. Its cantilever tailplane was mounted on top of the fuselage.

The undercarriage was fixed and conventional with mainwhels on oleo struts, enclosed in aerofoil section trouser fairings, and a skid under the tail.

== Operational history ==
The date of the SAM-10s first flight is not known but it underwent two months of official tests from early June 1938. Its outstanding performance resulted in orders for both passenger and ambulance configurations but the unavailability of its engine blocked production.

In response, two SAM-10bis, powered by the more available but less powerful MV-6 and with unaltered dimensions but one less seat, were built. The reduced power reduced performance, for example, the time taken to reach 1,000 m (3,300 ft) rose from 2.7 to 3.2 minutes; no further orders were forthcoming.

== Variants ==
SAM-10
Original 5/6 seat passenger or ambulance, with 220 kW (300 hp) MM-1 engine.

SAM-10bis
4/5 seats, with 200 kW (270 hp) MV-6 engine.

== Specifications (SAM-10) ==
Data from Osprey Encyclopedia of Russian Aircraft 1875-1995

General characteristics

- Crew: 1
- Capacity: 5-6 passengers
- Length: 8.5 m (27 ft 11 in)
- Wingspan: 11.49 m (37 ft 8 in)
- Wing area: 21.86 m^{2} (235.3 sq ft)
- Empty weight: 866 kg (1,909 lb)
- Gross weight: 1,436 kg (3,166 lb)
- Powerplant: 1 × Bessonov MM-1 6-cylinder, air-cooled, inverted inline, 220 kW (300 hp)
- Propellers: 2-bladed Ratier

Performance

- Maximum speed: 336 km/h (209 mph, 181 kn) at 1,700 m (5,600 ft)
- Landing speed: 87 km/h (54 mph; 47 kn),
- Range: 1,000 km (620 mi, 540 nmi)
- Service ceiling: 7,100 m (23,300 ft)
- Time to altitude: 2.7 min to 1,000 m (3,300 ft)
- Take-off distance: 95 m (312 ft)
- Landing run: 120 m (390 ft)
