= SABCA S.40 =

S.40
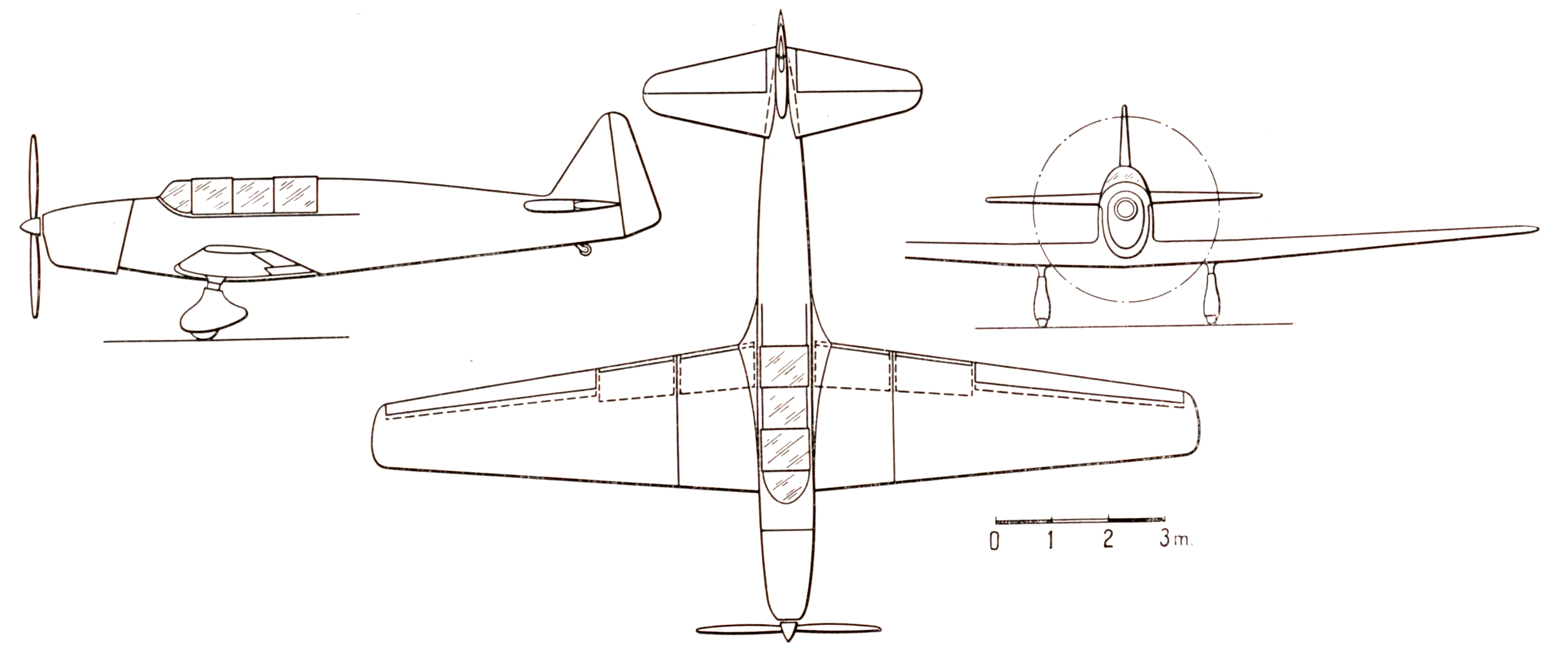
- 3-views of the SABCA S.40E

General information
- Type: Trainer
- National origin: Belgium
- Manufacturer: SABCA

History
- First flight: 1939

The SABCA S.40 was a military trainer aircraft built in Belgium in 1939.

== Design and development ==
The S.40 was a graceful, low-wing cantilever monoplane of conventional design with fixed, tailwheel undercarriage. The pilot and instructor sat in tandem cockpits, enclosed by sliding canopies. A single engine driving a two-blade propeller was mounted in the nose. The main undercarriage units were fully independent, mounted under the wings, and enclosed in spats. A small number were built for the Belgian military before the German invasion in 1940.

== Specifications ==
General characteristics

- Crew: two, pilot and instructor
- Length: 7.14 m (23 ft 5 in)
- Wingspan: 10.20 m (33 ft 6 in)
- Height: 2.40 m (7 ft 11 in)
- Empty weight: 780 kg (1,720 lb)
- Gross weight: 1,240 kg (2,730 lb)
- Powerplant: 1 × Renault 4Pei , 104 kW (140 hp)

Performance

- Maximum speed: 360 km/h (230 mph, 200 kn)
