= Caudron C.600 Aiglon =

1930s French two-seat sporting monoplane

Aiglon
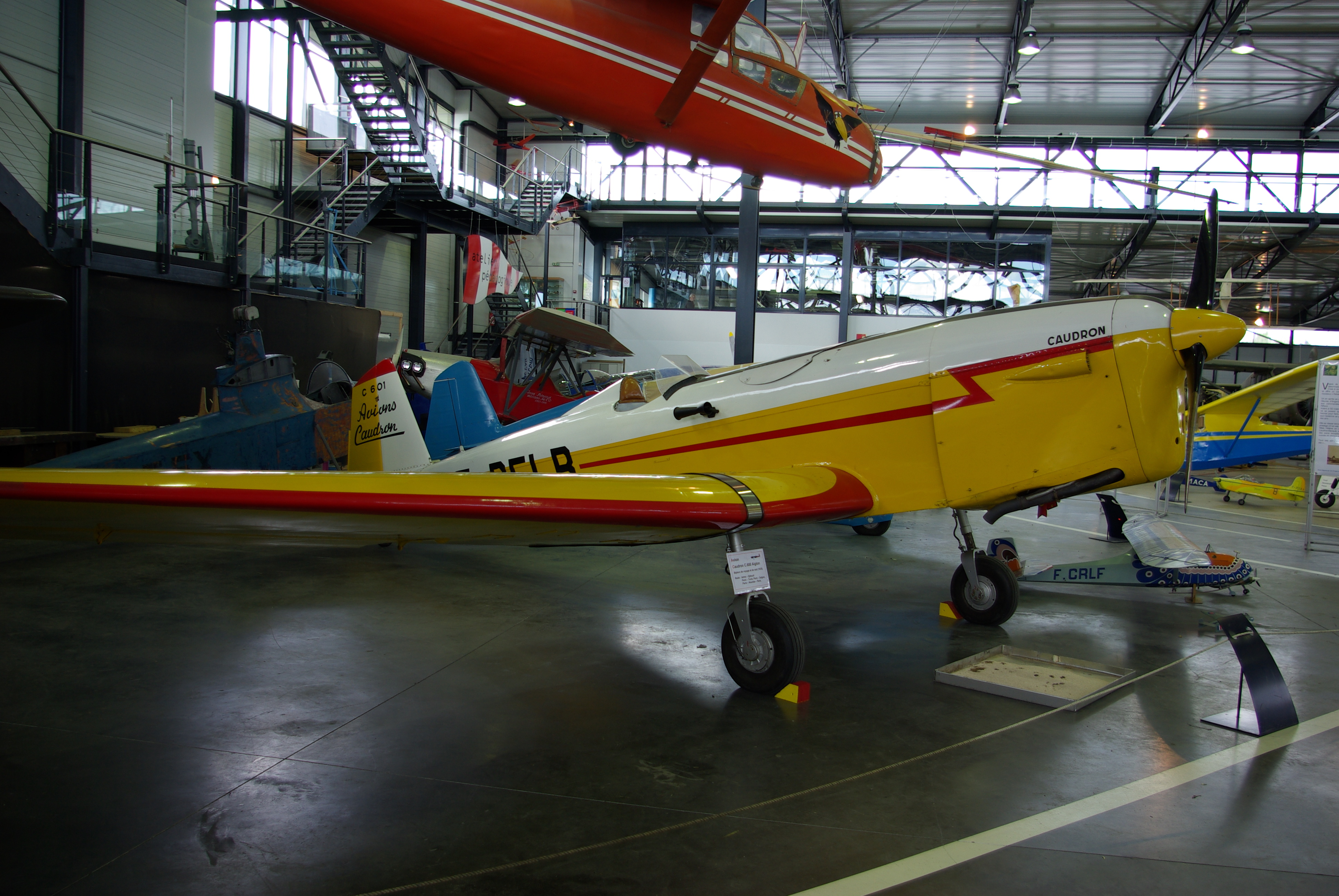
- Caudron C.601 Aiglon at the Musée Régional de l'Air at Angers-Marcé.

General information
- Type: Light Tourer
- Manufacturer: Caudron–Renault
- Designer: Marcel Riffard
- Number built: 203

History
- Introduction date: 1935
- First flight: 1935

The Caudron C.600 Aiglon is a 1930s French two-seat monoplane sport/touring aircraft built by Caudron–Renault.

== Development ==
The Aiglon (en: Eaglet) was designed by Marcel Riffard after he took over the design department when Caudron merged with Renault. The Aiglon was a two-seat low-wing cantilever monoplane with tandem open cockpits. The first of two prototypes first flew in March 1935 from Issy-les-Moulineaux, France. Two special long-distance versions (C.610 Aiglons) were built with increased fuel capacity. In December 1935 a C.610 was flown from Paris to Saigon at an average speed of 80 mph (129 km/h).

The type was popular with French private owners and flying clubs, and a number were sold abroad. With the outbreak of the Second World War many of the aircraft were requisitioned by the French Government for use as liaison aircraft by the Armée de l'Air. Total production of the Aiglon was 203 aircraft, including 178 of the basic Renault 4Pgi Bengali Junior powered model.

== Variants ==
C.600 Aiglon
production model with a Renault 4Pgi Bengali Junior engine, 178 built.
C.600G Aiglon
modified version with a de Havilland Gipsy Major engine, five built.
C.601 Aiglon Senior
modified version with a Renault 4Pei engine, 18 built.
C.610 Aiglon
special long-distance single-seat version with increased fuel, two built.
Caudron KXC1
A C.601 exported to Japan for evaluation by the Imperial Japanese Navy Air Service.

== Operators ==
The aircraft was operated by flying clubs, private individuals and a few air forces:

Argentina

- Argentine Air Force

France

- French Air Force

Guatemala

- Guatemalan Air Force

Hungary

- Royal Hungarian Air Force operated 6 aircraft between 1943 and 1945

Japan

- Imperial Japanese Navy Air Service, one example evaluated under designation KXC

Romania

- Royal Romanian Air Force

Spain

- Spanish Republican Air Force, used at El Carmolí fighter pilot training facility.

== Specifications (C.600) ==
Data from Aviafrance : Caudron C.600 'Aiglon'

General characteristics

- Crew: 2
- Length: 7.64 m (25 ft 1 in)
- Wingspan: 11.38 m (37 ft 4 in)
- Height: 2.89 m (9 ft 6 in)
- Empty weight: 560 kg (1,235 lb)
- Gross weight: 880 kg (1,940 lb)
- Fuel capacity: 100 L (26 US gal; 22 imp gal) in two centre-section tanks
- Powerplant: 1 × Renault 4Pgi Bengali Junior 4-cylinder inverted air-cooled in-line piston engtine, 75 kW (101 hp)
- Propellers: 2-bladed fixed-pitch propeller

Performance

- Maximum speed: 220 km/h (140 mph, 120 kn)
- Cruise speed: 190 km/h (120 mph, 100 kn)
- Range: 700 km (430 mi, 380 nmi)
- Service ceiling: 4,000 m (13,000 ft)

== See also ==
Related lists

- List of aircraft of World War II
- List of aircraft of the Spanish Republican Air Force

== Bibliography ==
- Grey, C.G.; Bridgman, Leonard, eds. (1937). Jane's All the World's Aircraft 1937. London: Sampson Low, Marston & company, ltd. pp. 121c–122c.
- Grey, C.G.; Bridgman, Leonard, eds. (1938). Jane's All the World's Aircraft 1938. London: Sampson Low, Marston & company, ltd. p. 123c.
- Grey, C.G.; Bridgman, Leonard, eds. (1939). Jane's All the World's Aircraft 1939. London: Sampson Low, Marston & company, ltd. p. 107c-108c.
