= Moskalyev SAM-25 =

SAM-25

General information
- Type: Military assault and transport
- National origin: USSR
- Manufacturer: GAZ-18, Voronezh
- Designer: Aleksandr Sergeyevitch Moskalyev
- Number built: uncertain

History
- First flight: 1942-3

The Moskalyev SAM-25 was an early 1940s Soviet, military assault transport, the last of a series of developments of the successful Moskalyev SAM-5.

== Design and development ==
The single engine, high wing Moskalyev SAM-5bis-2 was a 1934 light transport developed into four more different types, of which the SAM-25 was the last. Apart from having a more powerful engine, it was an updated and refined version of the original.

It had the same high-set, wooden, two spar, cantilever wing as the SAM-5bis-2, with ply-skin ahead of the forward spar forming a torsion resistant box. The whole surface, including the ply-skinned leading edge, was fabric covered. The SAM-25's wings introduced drooping ailerons, slotted automatic slotted flaps and automatic slats.

It was powered by a nose-mounted 108–123 kW (145–165 hp) Shvetsov M-11F five cylinder, radial engine, installed with its cylinders largely exposed for cooling. As in the earlier versions, the fuselage had a wooden girder structure. The pilot's enclosed cockpit was ahead of the wing leading edge and the cabin was behind him under the wing. Its port side had a central entry door with one window ahead of it and entry door/stretcher hatch/photography window aft. Behind the cabin the fuselage narrowed to the SAM-5bis-2-style tail, with a blunted triangular fin and more rounded rudder, though the latter was now fuller, with trim tabs. A blunted triangular plan tailplane was mounted on top of the fuselage and carried rounded, tabbed elevators, separated for rudder movement.

Like the SAM-14, the SAM-25 had fixed, wide-splayed cantilever landing gear, each side with a landing leg and drag strut within a common fairing.

== Operational history ==
It was evaluated from mid 1943. There has been some debate about production: later post-war evidence suggests there were no wartime machines but there was post-war series production from 1946 for Aeroflot.

== Specifications ==
Data from The Osprey Encyclopedia of Russian Aircraft 1875-1995

General characteristics

- Crew: one
- Capacity: five passengers
- Length: 8.02 m (26 ft 4 in)
- Wingspan: 11.49 m (37 ft 8 in)
- Wing area: 21.86 m^{2} (235.3 sq ft)
- Airfoil: R-II
- Empty weight: 720 kg (1,587 lb)
- Gross weight: 1,280 kg (2,822 lb)
- Powerplant: 1 × Shvetsov M-11F 5-cylinder radial, 108–123 kW (145–165 hp)
- Propellers: 2-bladed

Performance

- Maximum speed: 200 km/h (120 mph, 110 kn) at sea level
- Range: 1,760 km (1,090 mi, 950 nmi)
- Service ceiling: 4,850 m (15,910 ft)
- Take-off distance: 150 m (490 ft)
- Landing speed: 65 km/h (40 mph; 35 kn)
