= Moskalyev SAM-7 Sigma =

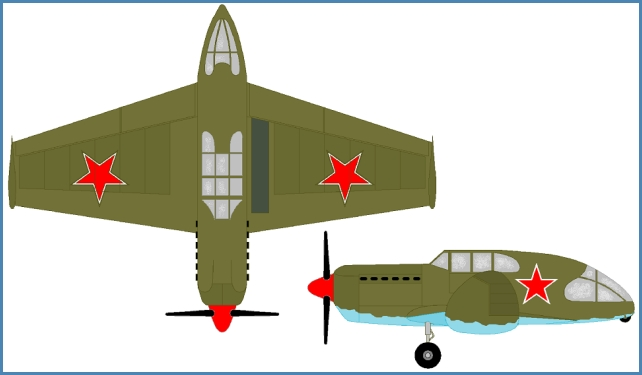
- Nominal representation of the SAM-7

General information
- Type: Experimental tailess fighter aircraft
- National origin: USSR
- Manufacturer: GAZ-18, Voronezh
- Designer: Aleksandr Sergeyevitch Moskalyev
- Number built: 1

History
- First flight: October 1935

The Moskalyev SAM-7 Sigma was a one-off, Soviet, experimental tailless fighter aircraft.

== Design and development ==
As early as 1933, Aleksandr Moskalyev was designing a rocket-powered, tailless aircraft with an ogival or gothic delta wing, wingtip fins and rudders, which would be able to fly faster than sound. Because no sufficiently powerful engines were available at the time, the Moskalyev SAM-4 Sigma never left the drawing board but it did lead to two interim types, the SAM-7 Sigma and SAM-9 Strela.

The all-metal Sigma was intended to investigate the manoeuvrability and field of fire of a two seat, tailless, wingtip finned fighter aircraft, using a less radical low aspect ratio, trapezoidal plan wing. This low wing had two spars and trailing edges carrying inboard elevators and outboard ailerons. The fins bore balanced rudders; six Soviet diagrams show different profiles and no photographs of the completed Sigma are known.

The Sigma was powered by a 820 hp (610 kW) V-12 Mikulin AM-34 engine mounted ahead of the wing leading edge and driving a four blade, wooden propeller. At high speeds it was cooled with surface radiators, supplemented at low speed by a retractable radiator. The pilot sat over mid chord in an enclosed cockpit. The fuselage ended behind the trailing edge with a glazed and enclosed position for the rear gunner.

It had conventional, retractable landing gear with single landing legs hinging inward on the forward spars. There was a small, semi-recessed tailwheel in the extreme rear fuselage.

The Sigma was first flown in October 1935. It was judged dangerous to fly as it was hard to keep straight during take-offs and had a high landing speed of 138 km/h (86 mph; 75 kn). Its flight characteristics were never fully explored and it never reached its estimated top speed of 500 km/h (310 mph; 270 kn) at altitude.

== Specifications (performance estimated) ==
Data from Osprey Encyclopedia of Russian Aircraft 1875-1995, Soviet X-Planes

General characteristics

- Crew: two
- Length: 7.0 m (23 ft 0 in)
- Wingspan: 9.46 m (31 ft 0 in)
- Wing area: 20.0 m^{2} (215 sq ft)
- Aspect ratio: 4.5
- Airfoil: R-II, 12% thickness
- Empty weight: 940 kg (2,072 lb)
- Gross weight: 1,480 kg (3,263 lb)
- Powerplant: 1 × Mikulin AM-34 upright, water-cooled V-12, 610 kW (820 hp)
- Propellers: 4-bladed wooden, ex-Tupolev TB-3

Performance

- Maximum speed: 435 km/h (270 mph, 235 kn) at sea level

500 km/h (310 mph; 270 kn) at altitude

- Range: 800 km (500 mi, 430 nmi)
- Service ceiling: 9,200 m (30,200 ft)
- Landing speed: 138 km/h (86 mph; 75 kn) (from flight tests)

Armament

- Guns: 2×ShKAS 7.62 mm (0.300 in) machine guns mounted above engine, plus 1 or 2 on a flexible mount, controlled by rear gunner.
