= Gourdou G.120 Hy =

G.120

General information
- Type: Reconnaissance floatplane
- National origin: France
- Manufacturer: Gourdou
- Number built: 1

History
- First flight: 1 June 1940

The Gourdou G.120 Hy was a prototype French shipboard reconnaissance floatplane. A single prototype was completed, flying for the first time in June 1940, but was destroyed later that month to avoid capture by German troops.

== Development and design ==
In March 1937, the French Navy issued a specification for a "light seaplane" to replace the Potez 452 and Gourdou-Leseurre GL-832 HY that operated from the French Navy's cruisers and sloops, The specification required that the new aircraft would be able to be launched by the 1,600 kg (3,500 lb) capacity catapults of these ships. A separate, parallel, specification was issued for a "heavy seaplane" for 3,500 kg (7,700 lb) catapults. The light seaplane would have a primary role of observation and reconnaissance, with secondary duties of convoy escort and ground attack in low-intensity warfare. A speed range of 90–250 km/h (56–155 mph; 90–250 km/h) was required, with a cruise speed of 110–120 km/h (68–75 mph; 59–65 kn). A bomb load of eight 10 kg (22 lb) was specified.

The Gourdou company (formerly Gourdou-Leseurre) began work on an aircraft to meet the light seaplane requirement, the G-120 Hy, in late 1937, (Note: Gourdou also developed a design for the heavy seaplane requirement, the G.130, which was of similar layout to the G.120, but this was abandoned without being built.) with chief designer G. Bruner leading the design team. The GY.120 was a twin-engined, two-seat monoplane. The wings had a light-alloy structure and fabric covering, and folded immediately outboard of the engine nacelles. Large flaps occupied the whole of the wing's trailing edge and enabled the G.120 to meet the wide speed range required by the specification. Spoilers were used for lateral control. The fuselage structure was made of welded chrome-molydennum steel tube, with the forward fuselage being clad in removable metal panels and the aft fuselage fabric covered. A twin-tail was fitted to give a better field of fire for the rear machine gun. The pilot's cockpit was situated in the nose, with the radio-operator/gunner sitting adjacent to the trailing edge. The gunner's position had a single flexibly mounted 7.5 mm Darne machine gun, with a second gun fixed in the aircraft's nose. The aircraft was powered by two Renault 4P-O1 4-cylinder inverted inline aero engines rated at 140 hp (100 kW) and driving two-bladed fixed-pitch metal propellers.

== Testing and flight ==
In June 1938 full-scale wind tunnel testing of the G.120's wings and innovative system of flaps was carried out at Chalais-Meudon at the behest of the French Service Technique de l'Aéronautique. These tests were successful, and as a result, the French Navy ordered the construction of a prototype, which was completed at Gourdou's Saint-Maur-des-Fossés factory in December 1939. The prototype was then moved to Chalais-Meudon for more full-scale wind tunnel testing, which continued through to February 1940, and proved successful.

The prototype was transferred to Athis-Mons on 1 June 1940, being launched onto the river Seine on that morning for water-taxing tests. Later that day, during further taxi trials with the flaps extended, the G.120 unexpectedly took-off at a speed of about 70 km/h (43 mph; 38 kn), rising to a height of 20 m (66 ft). The pilot managed to safely land the prototype after a flight distance of 200 m (660 ft). On 2 June the prototype was flown again, for a distance of over 3 km (1.9 mi; 1.6 nmi) and to a height of 50 m (160 ft). The test pilot noted that longitudinal control was poor during the flight. Work to correct this problem could not be completed before the German army neared Paris, and this resulted in the prototype being destroyed, with the wreckage being sunk in the Seine.

== Specifications (performance estimated) ==
Data from Gourdou G120

General characteristics

- Crew: 2
- Length: 9.14 m (30 ft 0 in)
- Wingspan: 12.00 m (39 ft 4 in)
- Height: 3.06 m (10 ft 0 in) (to top of propellers)
- Wing area: 18.40 m^{2} (198.1 sq ft)
- Gross weight: 1,600 kg (3,527 lb)
- Powerplant: 2 × Renault 4P-01 air-cooled inverted inline engines, 100 kW (140 hp) each

Performance

- Maximum speed: 250 km/h (160 mph, 130 kn)
- Cruise speed: 110 km/h (68 mph, 59 kn) (search speed)
- Stall speed: 90 km/h (56 mph, 49 kn)
- Range: 375 km (233 mi, 202 nmi) at 1,000 metres (3,280 ft)
- Endurance: 2 hr 30 min
- Service ceiling: 5,700 m (18,700 ft)

Armament

- Guns: 2× 7.5 mm Darne machine guns (1× fixed forward firing gun and 1× flexibly mounted gun in rear cockpit)
- Bombs: 8× 10 kg (22 lb) bombs
