= Itoh Emi 1 =

1910s Japanese biplane aircraft

General information
- Type: Single seat civil aircraft
- National origin: Japan
- Manufacturer: Itoh Aeroplane Research Studio (Itoh Hikoki Kenkyusho)
- Designer: Orojiro Itoh
- Number built: 1

History
- First flight: 11 November 1915

The Itoh Emi 1 was Japan's second successful civil aircraft and the first design of Orojiro Itoh.

== Design and development ==
Otijiro Itoh became interested in aviation in his teens, sought guidance from the pioneering Sanji Narahara and joined his group in 1910, age 19. Later he assisted Shigesaburo Torigai, another Japanese pioneer, in the construction of the Torigai ''Hyabusa-go''. This aircraft crashed on its first flight, was repaired and crashed again, though possibly because of its pilot's inexperience. Itoh repaired and redesigned it, making it usable and teaching himself to fly. By early 1915 he had established the Itoh Aeroplane Research Studio and an associated flying school and by that autumn had completed his first design, the Emi 1. The "Emi" was a respectful nod to the district of Osaka where he grew up.

The sole Emi 1 was a three bay biplane with a fabric covered wooden structure. Its wings were of equal span and joined by parallel pairs of interplane struts. The upper wing was well above the fuselage and the lower ones mounted on the lower fuselage longerons. The Hyabusa-go's French, 35–45 hp (26–34 kW) Grégoire Gyp four cylinder, water-cooled inline engine powered it. Its pilot had an open cockpit. At a time when there were few prepared airstrips, landing gear needed to be robust and the Emi 1's gear had two wheels on each leg.

Its first flight was on 11 November 1915.

== Operational history ==
On 8 January 1916, not long after the first flight, Itoh flew the Emi 1 from his base at Inage Bay to Tokyo. This took 55 minutes and was the first flight to Tokyo. He later flew it to 58 Japanese cities, partly to advertise his aircraft and partly to raise air-mindedness in Japan. The Emi 1 was the second successful Japanese aircraft, following the Narahara 4 ''Ohtori-go''.

Later the Emi 1 was re-engined at Inage Bay with a 50 hp (37 kW) Hino Type, remaining in use with the flying school.

== Specifications (Emi 1) ==
Data from Japanese Aircraft 1910-1941

General characteristics

- Crew: one
- Length: 6.65 m (21 ft 10 in)
- Wingspan: 11.50 m (37 ft 9 in)
- Height: 2.50 m (8 ft 2 in)
- Wing area: 33 m^{2} (360 sq ft)
- Empty weight: 350 kg (772 lb)
- Powerplant: 1 × Grégoire Gyp 4-cylinder water-cooled inverted inline piston engine, 26–34 kW (35–45 hp)
- Propellers: 2-bladed fixed-pitch propeller

Performance

- Maximum speed: 76 km/h (47 mph, 41 kn)
