= Renault 4P =

4P
- Type: Air-cooled 4-cylinder inverted inline piston engine
- National origin: France
- Manufacturer: Renault

The Renault 4P, also called the Renault Bengali Junior, was a series of air-cooled 4-cylinder inverted inline aero engines designed and built in France from 1927, which produced from 95 hp (71 kW) to 150 hp (110 kW).

== Design and development ==
Charles Lindbergh's Atlantic Ocean crossing in 1927 inspired Renault to enter the light aero-engine market to diversify the range of engines they offered. The resulting Renault 4Ps, with 115 mm (4.5 in) bore and 140 mm (5.5 in) stroke, delivered 95 hp (71 kW) and proved popular, later versions powering several record-breaking light aircraft.

Developed by Charles-Edmond Serre, by 1931 the 6.3-litre 4Pdi had evolved to give 110 hp (82 kW) to 120 hp (89 kW), with the adoption of 120 mm (4.7 in) bore steel cylinder liners, aluminium alloy cylinder heads attached by long studs to the crankcase, Duralumin connecting rods and magnesium alloy crankcase.

The 4Pei was produced in the USSR, with local equipment and features from the MV-6, as the Voronezh MV-4 (Motor Vozdushniy / Motor Voronezhskiy - air-cooled engine / Voronezh built engine {correct interpretation is unclear}).

In 1946 production of the Renault 4P-01 resumed at the SNECMA factory at Arnage, until 1949, with at least 762 engines manufactured.

== Variants ==
Renault 4Ps
The initial version with 115 mm (4.53 in) bore and 140 mm (5.51 in) stroke, delivered 71 kW (95 hp)
Renault 4Pa
Renault 4Pb
upright 71 kW (95 hp) / 298 lb (135 kg) - Caudron Luciole
Renault 4Pbi
Inverted development of the Pb retaining the 115 mm (4.53 in) bore
Renault 4Pc
Further development of the Ps retaining the 115 mm (4.53 in) bore
Renault 4Pci
inverted 4Pc
Renault 4Pde
Renault 4Pdi
Inverted, introduced 120 mm (4.72 in) bore steel cylinder liners, aluminium alloy cylinder heads attached by long studs to the crankcase, Duralumin connecting rods and magnesium alloy crankcase. 110 hp / 150 kg - Hanriot 16, 120 hp / 155 kg - Caudron Phalène
Renault 4Pei
Inverted, rated at 110 kW (150 hp) for take-off, the 4Pei entered production before WWII
Renault 4Pfi
Renault 4Pgi
Inverted lower rated version, giving 78 kW (105 hp) for take-off, using 73-octane fuel.
Renault 4Po
Renault 4Poi
100 kW (140 hp) with fuel injection.
Renault 4P-01
Postwar production version of the 4Pei, rated at 145 hp (108 kW) for take-off.
Renault 4P-03
As the 4P-01 but with an inverted flight Zenith carburettor
Renault 4P-05
As for the 4P-03 but with a modified oil system
Renault 4P-07
As for the 4P-03 but with a modified carburettor
MV-4
Licence production of a 110 kW (150 hp) Renault 4Pei variant in the USSR at the Voronezh factory. 180+ were built in 1939 before production ceased, due to a shortage of indigenous carburettors.

== Applications ==
- Albert 4P
- ANF Les Mureaux 160T
- Aubert Cigale
- Bodiansky 20
- Boisavia Mercurey
- Caudron C.193
- Caudron C.232
- Caudron C.270 Luciole
- Caudron C.280 Phalène
- Caudron C.362
- Caudron C.430 Rafale
- Caudron C.480 Frégate
- Caudron C.510 Pelican
- Caudron C.530 Rafale
- Caudron C.580
- Caudron C.600 Aiglon
- Caudron C.601 Aiglon Senior
- Caudron C.610
- Farman F.230
- Farman F.281
- Farman F.350
- Gourdou G.120 Hy
- Guillemin JG.10
- Max Holste MH.52
- Hanriot LH.16
- Hanriot H.180
- Morane-Saulnier MS.341
- Nord Norécrin
- Potez 36/19
- SABCA S.40
- Stampe et Vertongen SV-4B
- Sud-Est SE-2100
- Sud-Est SE-2300
- Sud-Est SE-2310
- Moskalyev SAM-14
- Yakovlev UT-2

== Specifications (Renault 4P-01) ==
Data from Aircraft engines of the World 1946.

=== General characteristics ===
- Type: 4-cylinder naturally aspirated air-cooled inverted in-line piston aircraft engine
- Bore: 120 mm (4.7 in)
- Stroke: 140 mm (5.5 in)
- Displacement: 6.33 L (386 cu in)
- Length: 1,729 mm (68.1 in)
- Width: 480 mm (19 in)
- Height: 708 mm (27.9 in)
- Dry weight: 147 kg (324 lb)

=== Components ===
- Valvetrain: Pushrod-actuated, single intake and single exhaust valve per cylinder
- Fuel system: 1x Zenith 601GS down-draught carburettor
- Fuel type: 80 Octane petrol
- Oil system: Pressure fed, 3.0 kg/cm^{2} (43 lbf/in^{2}), dry sump
- Cooling system: Air

=== Performance ===
- Power output:
- 145 hp (108 kW) at 2,450 rpm at take-off
- 140 hp (100 kW) at 2,400 rpm at sea-level normal
- 110 hp (82 kW) at 2,200 rpm at sea-level cruise
- Specific power: 17.15 kW/L (0.38 hp/in^{3})
- Compression ratio: 5.8:1
- Specific fuel consumption: 0.186 kg/kW/hr
- Oil consumption: 0.005 kg/kW/hr
- Power-to-weight ratio: 0.74 kW/kg

== See also ==
Comparable engines

- de Havilland Gipsy Major
- Menasco Pirate

Related lists

- List of aircraft engines
