= Caudron C.430 Rafale =

1930s French touring aircraft

C.430 Rafale
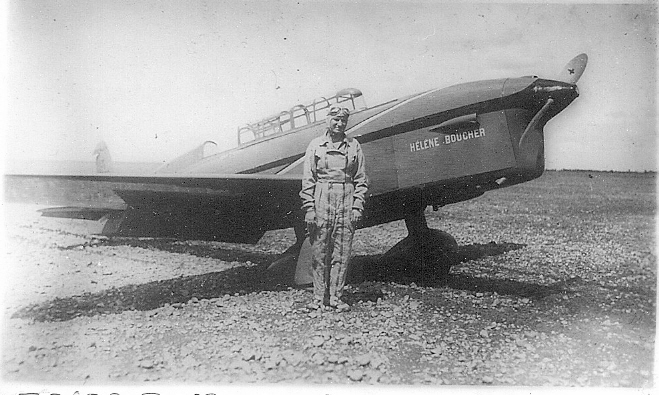

General information
- Type: Two seat touring aircraft
- National origin: France
- Manufacturer: Société des Avions Caudron
- Designer: Marcel Riffard
- Number built: 2

History
- First flight: c.24 March 1934

The Caudron C.430 Rafale was a fast, two seat French touring monoplane. Soon after its first flight in 1933 it set an international class speed record.

== Design and development ==
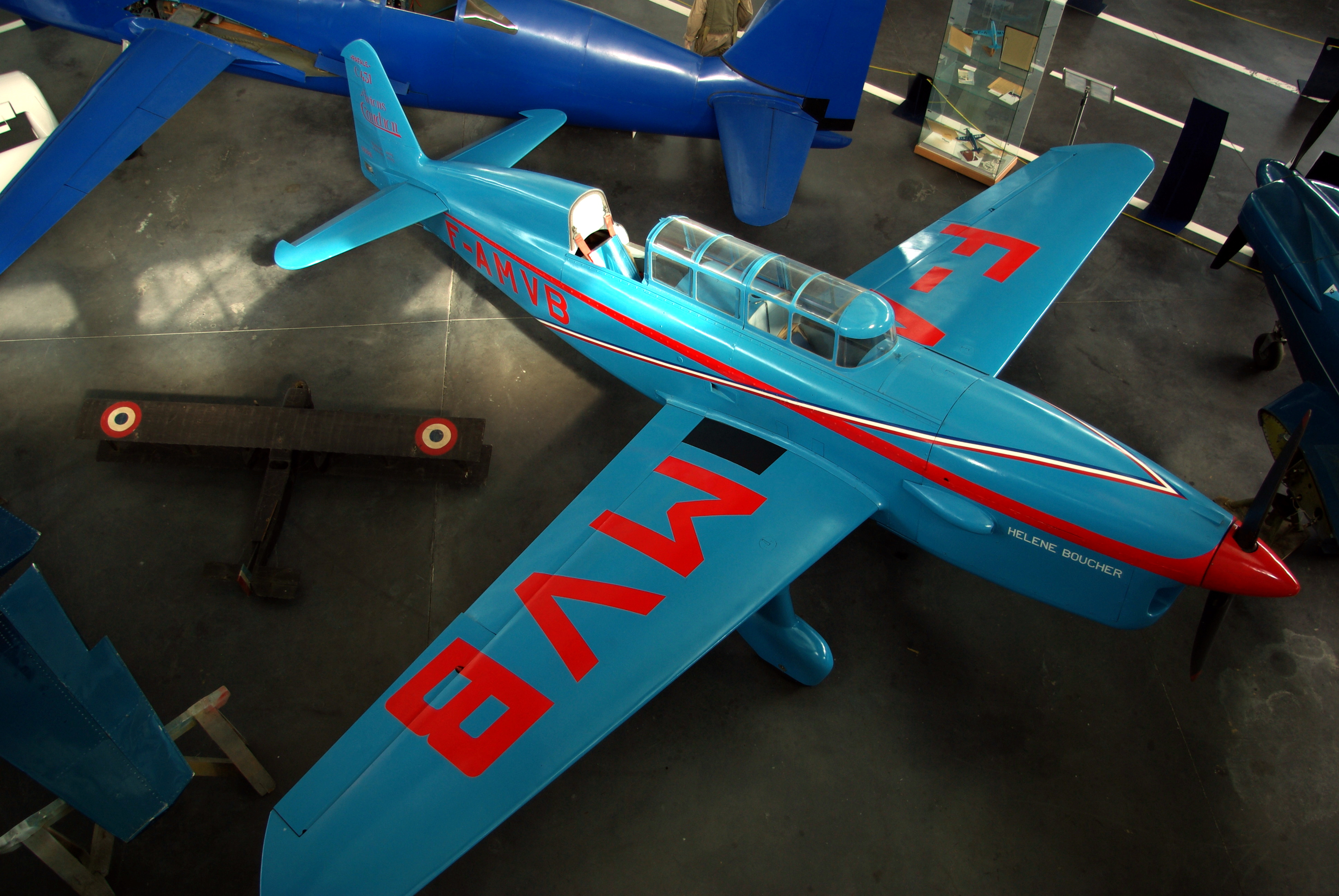
C.430 Rafale replica built by Jean Precetti

The C.430 Rafale was a two-seat development of the single seat Caudron C.362, the winner of the 1933 Coupe Deutsch de la Meurthe. Slightly larger and heavier, though with a lower wing loading, the Rafale was a low wing cantilever monoplane, wood framed and covered with a mixture of plywood and fabric. Its one piece, single spar wing was strongly straight tapered to elliptical tips and was plywood covered with an outer layer of fabric. There were flaps inboard of the ailerons.

Its fuselage was flat sided and fabric covered, with a deep, rounded decking running the full length. It had an air cooled 110 kW (150 hp) inverted four cylinder 6.3 L (380 cu in) inline Renault 4Pei Bengali engine in the nose, driving a two blade, two position variable pitch propeller. The Rafale's two seats were in tandem, one over the wing and the other behind the trailing edge, under a long (about a third of the fuselage length), narrow multi-framed canopy with a blunt, vertical windscreen and sliding access. Behind the canopy a long fairing continued its profile to the straight tapered, round tipped vertical tail, which included a balanced rudder that ended at the top of the fuselage. The tapered horizontal tail, with inset elevators, was mounted on the top of the fuselage largely ahead of the fin. Construction of the empennage was similar to that of the wing. The Rafale had a fixed tailskid undercarriage. Its wheels were on vertical legs from the wings and were largely enclosed within magnesium spats.

The C.430 Rafale F-AMVB probably flew for the first time in the last week of March 1934, though the other example may have flown earlier.

A replica of Helene Boucher's F-AMVB was built by Jean Precetti, which is now on display at the Musée de l'Air d'Angers.

In 2023, Renault introduces the Renault Rafale vehicle as a tribute to the Caudron C.430 Rafale.

== Operational history ==
On 31 March 1934, only about a week after its first flight, the C.430 F-AMVB set a new international speed record of 292 km/h (181 mph) over 100 kilometres (62 mi) for aircraft with an empty weight less than 560 kg (1,235 lb).

Hélène Boucher, a prominent French pilot in the mid-1930s, died in a landing approach accident in F-AMVB on 30 November 1934.

Though Caudron dominated the 1935 Coupe Deutsch de la Meurthe, the single seat C.430/1 Rafale, F-AMVA re-engined with a more powerful 130 kW (180 hp) Renault 438, was outclassed by the single seat C.450 and C.460 machines and retired with engine problems after a few circuits.

== Variants ==
C.430
As described below; two built.
C.430/1
F-AMVA fitted with a 130 kW (180 hp) Renault 438 engine in October 1934 for the 1935 Coupe Deutsch de la Meurthe.

== Specifications (C.430) ==
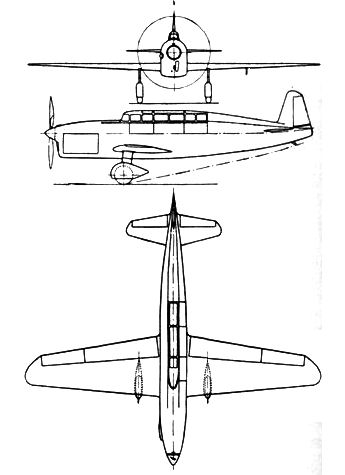
Caudron C.430 3-view drawing from L'Aerophile April 1934

Data from l'Aérophile April 1933 p.114

General characteristics

- Crew: Two
- Length: 7.1 m (23 ft 4 in)
- Wingspan: 7.7 m (25 ft 3 in)
- Height: 1.88 m (6 ft 2 in)
- Wing area: 9.0 m^{2} (97 sq ft)
- Empty weight: 480 kg (1,058 lb)
- Gross weight: 820 kg (1,808 lb)
- Fuel capacity: 160 L (35 imp gal; 42 US gal)
- Powerplant: 1 × Renault 4Pei 6.3 L (380 cu in) 4 cylinder, air cooled, inverted inline, 110 kW (150 hp)
- Propellers: 2-bladed Ratier, metal two position variable pitch, adjustable in flight

Performance

- Maximum speed: 305 km/h (190 mph, 165 kn)
- Cruise speed: 260 km/h (160 mph, 140 kn) at 75% power
- Range: 1,000 km (620 mi, 540 nmi) at 75% power
- Service ceiling: 5,750 m (18,860 ft)
- Landing speed: 95 km/h (59 mph)
