= Moskalyev SAM-5 =

1930s Soviet transport or air ambulance monoplane

General information
- Type: Transport and air ambulance monoplane
- National origin: Soviet Union
- Manufacturer: GAZ-18, Voronezh
- Designer: Aleksandr Moskalyev
- Number built: 40

History
- First flight: 1930s

The Moskalyev SAM-5 was a 1930s Soviet transport or air ambulance monoplane designed by Aleksandr Moskalyev. The type served in small numbers in the Second World War as an air ambulance.

== Development and design ==
The SAM-5 was a cantilever high-wing monoplane with fixed conventional landing gear and an enclosed cabin for a pilot and four passengers. The first prototype was built using stressed-skin light alloy construction but it had problems with the quality of workmanship in what was an unfamiliar material. The second-prototype SAM-5bis was built using plywood and fabric and had wing bracing and a more slender fuselage. After testing 37 production aircraft were built and they were delivered from 1937 as air ambulances with room for three patients and an attendant.

Moskalyev then worked on an improved variant, the SAM-5-2bis, tested with a 200 hp (149 kW) engine; the aircraft established distance and height records. An order was placed for 200 of the improved variant, again for use as an air ambulance but they were never built. This last SAM-5 variant led to four, differently numbered, developments.

== SAM-5-2bis developments ==
SAM-10
Low wing, 200–200 kW (270–270 hp) inline, 5/6 seater.
SAM-11
High wing, 200–200 kW (270–270 hp) inline, 4 seat amphibian.
SAM-14
High wing, 113 kW (152 hp) inline, 6 seat version.
SAM-25
High wing, 145–165 kW (194–221 hp) radial, military assault/ transport.

== Specifications (SAM-5bis) ==
Data from

General characteristics

- Crew: 1
- Capacity: 3 patients and one attendant
- Length: 8.00 m (26 ft 3 in) approx
- Wingspan: 12.50 m (41 ft 0 in)
- Wing area: 24.00 m^{2} (258.3 sq ft)
- Airfoil: RII
- Empty weight: 710 kg (1,565 lb)
- Max takeoff weight: 1,219 kg (2,687 lb)
- Powerplant: 1 × Shvetsov M-11 five-cylinder radial piston engine, 75 kW (100 hp)

Performance

- Maximum speed: 173 km/h (107 mph, 93 kn)
- Range: 900 km (560 mi, 490 nmi)
- Service ceiling: 2,800 m (9,200 ft)

== See also ==
Related lists

- List of aircraft of World War II
