= Caudron C.280 Phalène =

1930s French aircraft

C.280 Phalène
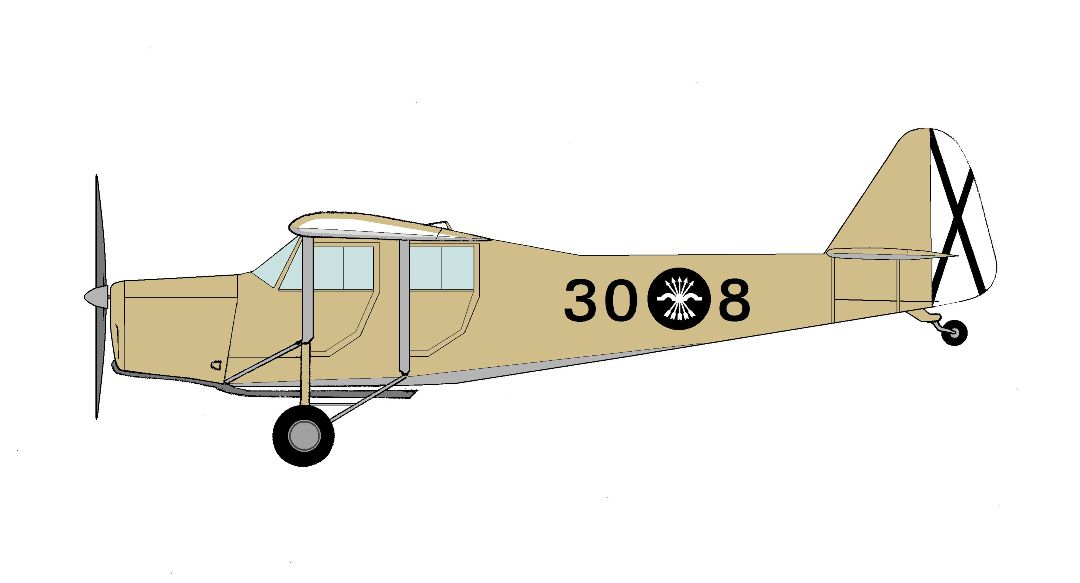
- Caudron C.286 of the Nationalist Spanish Air Force

General information
- Type: Utility aircraft
- Manufacturer: Caudron
- Designer: Paul Deville
- Number built: 240 (plus 51 military examples)

History
- First flight: March 1932

The Caudron C.280 Phalène ("Moth") was a civil utility aircraft built in France during the 1930s. It was a high-wing braced monoplane of conventional configuration with fixed tailskid undercarriage. The pilot and two-three passengers were accommodated within an enclosed cabin. The structure was wooden throughout, with the forward fuselage skinned with plywood, and the rest of the aircraft fabric-covered.

The type proved popular on the civil market, with a number of long-distance flights staged to promote it. The French military also purchased a number of examples under the C.400 and C.410 designations. The Caudron C.286 that ended up in the Second Spanish Republic was captured by the nationalist faction and used as liaison aircraft during the Spanish Civil War.

== Variants ==
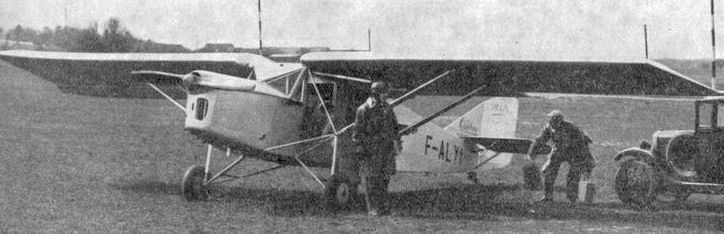
Caudron C.280 Phalène photo from L'Aerophile May 1932

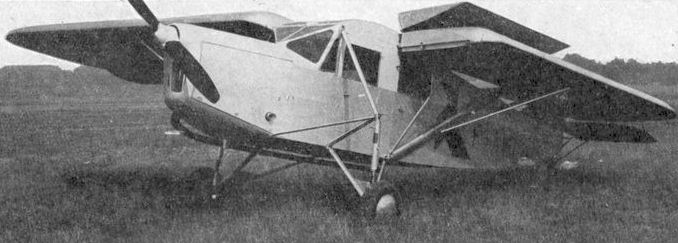
Caudron C.286 photo from L'Aerophile Salon 1932

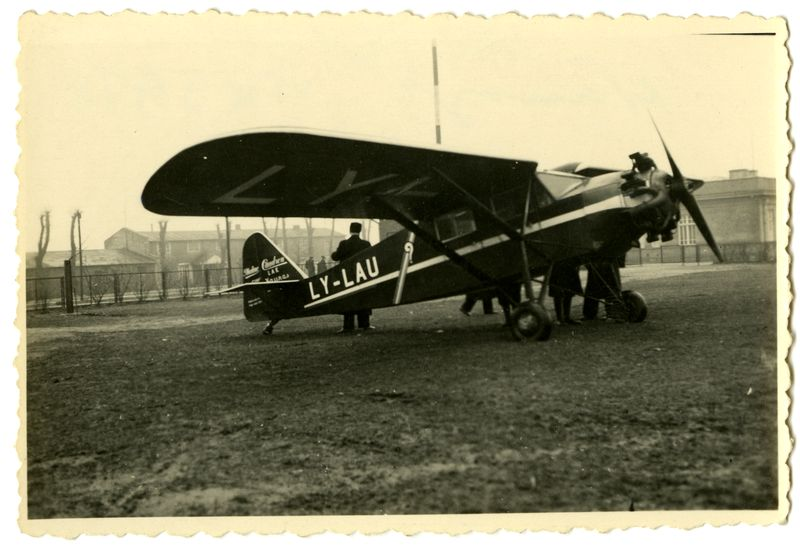
Caudron C.280 Phalène of Aeroclub of Lithuania, after March 1936

- C.280 - Initial version, powered by 101 kW (135 hp) Salmson 9Nc radial engine. Five built.
- C.280/6 Phalène - Revised tail, Salmson 9Nc engine. One built.
- C.280/9 Phalène - Fuselage was lengthened by 20 cm (7.9 in), Salmson 9nc engine. Three built.
- C.282 Phalène - Powered by a 75 kW (100 hp) Renault 4Pci engine. 11 built.
- C.282/2 Phalène IV - Powered by a 89 kW (120 hp) Renault 4Pdi engine. 21 built.
- C.282/3 Phalène - based on C.282 with reduced fuel and Renault 4Pdi engine. One built.
- C.282/4 Super Phalène - fitted with dual controls, automatic slots and flaps, with Renault 4Pdi engine. Ten built.
- C.282/7 Super Phalène - Renault 4Pdi engine. One built.
- C.282/8 - Major production version, with stretched fuselage and more fuel. Powered by Renault 4Pdi engine. 89 built. equipped with a 108 kW (145 hp) Renault 4Pdi piston engine.
- C282/9 - 100 kW (140 hp) Renault 4Pei. Six built.
- C.282/10 - Equipped with the Merville series 601 propeller and powered by Renault 4Pei. Ten built.
- C.286 Phalène VI - Powered by a 78 kW (105 hp) de Havilland Gipsy III engine. One built.
- C.286/2 Phalène VI - Powered by 89 kW (120 hp) de Havilland Gipsy Major I and fitted with rounded wingtips. Eleven built.
- C.286/2S4 Super Phalène and C.286/3S4 Super Phalène' - Special luxury versions, powered by the de Havilland Gipsy Major I engine. Three built.
- C.282/4 Super Phalène - Modified tail as per C.280/6. Gipsy Major I. Five built.
- C.286/5 Super-Phalène - Modified wings and tail. Gipsy Major I. One built.
- C.286/6 Super-Phalène - Based on C.286/5 with Merville 501 propeller. Five built.
  - C.286/7 Super-Phalene - equipped with Ratier series 1175 variable-pitch propeller. (Eight built)
  - C.286/8 Super-Phalène - The fuselage was lengthened slightly, it was powered by a de Havilland Gipsy Major piston engine. (Four built)
  - C.286/9 Super-Phalene - The fuselage was slightly shorter. (One built)
- C.289/2 -Powered by a 112 kW (150 hp) Hispano-Suzia 5Q radial piston engine. (Five built)
- C.400 - Military version. 40 were built for the French Air Force.
  - C.401 - Several C.400s were modified for civilian use during the postwar years.
- C.410 - Military version, powered by a 104-kW (140-hp) Renault 4Pdi piston engine. (11 built)

== Operators ==
Belgian Congo

- Force Publique

France

- French Air Force

Lithuania

- Civil operator - Aero Club of Lithuania - 1 aircraft

Spain

- Civil operator - Caudron C.286 registered EC-ZZZ

Spanish State

- Nationalist Spanish Air Force

== Specifications (C.282/6) ==
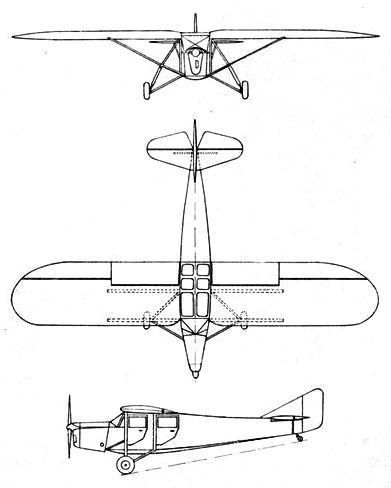
Caudron C.286 3-view drawing from L'Aerophile Salon 1932

General characteristics

- Crew: one pilot
- Capacity: two-three passengers
- Length: 8.25 m (27 ft 1 in)
- Wingspan: 11.62 m (38 ft 1 in)
- Height: 2.05 m (6 ft 9 in)
- Wing area: 25.4 m^{2} (273 sq ft)
- Empty weight: 590 kg (1,300 lb)
- Gross weight: 950 kg (2,094 lb)
- Powerplant: 1 × Renault 4Pdi , 108 kW (150 hp)

Performance

- Maximum speed: 185 km/h (115 mph, 100 kn)
- Range: 850 km (528 mi, 459 nmi)
- Service ceiling: 4,500 m (14,750 ft)

== See also ==
Related lists

- List of aircraft of World War II
