= Pierre Satre =

Pierre Satre (4 May 1909 – 12 July 1980) was a French engineer, and the chief designer of the Anglo-French Aérospatiale-BAC Concorde.

== Early life ==
He was born in Grenoble in south-east France, in the region of Rhône-Alpes.

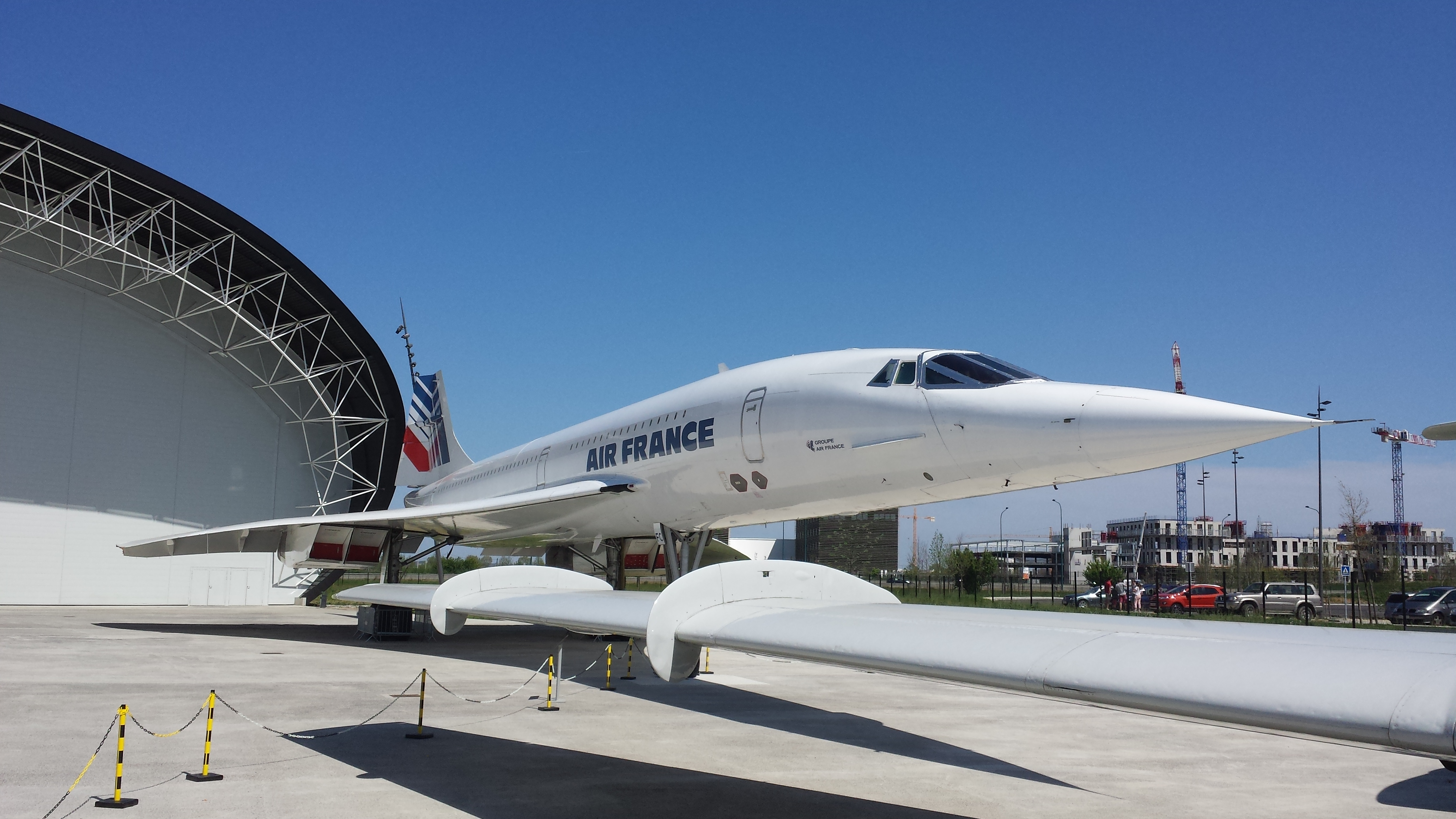
Concorde at the Aeroscopia museum in Blagnac (Toulouse) in April 2015

== Career ==
=== Sud Aviation ===
He became the Technical Director of Sud Aviation in Toulouse, in the Midi-Pyrénées region, working with Lucien Servanty.

=== Concorde ===
He became the Chief Designer of Concorde. Experiments for the new aircraft were carried out on the 1950s supersonic Dassault Mirage III, and later the 1960s Dassault Mirage IV.

== Personal life ==
He died aged 71 on 12 July 1980. He received the Silver Medal of the Royal Aeronautical Society (RAeS). He received the French Legion of Honour (Légion d'honneur). He was awarded the FAI Gold Air Medal in 1959.

== See also ==
- List of RAeS medal recipients
