= Renault 6P =

1920s French piston aircraft engine

6P
- Type: Air-cooled 6-cyl inverted in-line piston engine
- National origin: France
- Manufacturer: Renault

The Renault 6P, also called the Renault Bengali, was a series of air-cooled 6-cylinder inverted in-line aero engines designed and built in France from the late 1920s, which produced from 130 kW (180 hp) to 200 kW (270 hp).

== Design and development ==
Charles Lindbergh's Atlantic Ocean crossing in 1927 inspired Renault to enter the light aero-engine market to diversify the range of engines they offered. To complement the 4P four-cylinder engines, Renault developed the 6P series, with 115 mm (4.5 in) bore and 140 mm (5.5 in) stroke; by adding two cylinders of the same bore and stroke.

Developed by Charles-Edmond Serre, the 9.5 L (579.73 cu in) 6P evolved to give 180 to 270 hp (130 to 200 kW), using 120 mm (4.7 in) bore steel cylinder liners, aluminium alloy cylinder heads attached by long studs to the crankcase, Duralumin connecting rods and magnesium alloy crankcase.

The 6P was also produced in the USSR, as the MV-6, (MV - Motor Vozdushniy / Motor Voronezhskiy - air-cooled engine / Voronezh built engine {correct interpretation is unclear}).

== Variants ==
Renault 6Pdi
inverted 6 in-line
Renault 6Pdis
with supercharger
Renault 6Pfi
130 kW (170 hp)
Voronezh MV-6
licence production in the USSR

== Applications ==
- Caudron C.630 Simoun
- Caudron C.684
- Morane-Saulnier MS.350 (Pei)
- Moskalyev SAM-9 Strela
- Moskalyev SAM-10bis
- Moskalyev SAM-11bis

== Specifications (Renault 6Pdi) ==
Data from Renault 1907-1934:27 Ans d'Aviation

=== General characteristics ===
- Type: 6-cylinder naturally aspirated air-cooled inverted in-line piston aircraft engine
- Bore: 120 mm (4.7 in)
- Stroke: 140 mm (5.5 in)
- Displacement: 9.5 L (579.73 in^{3})
- Dry weight: 205 kg (452 lb)

=== Components ===
- Valvetrain: Pushrod-actuated, single intake and single exhaust valve per cylinder
- Fuel type: 80 Octane gasoline
- Oil system: Pressure fed, 3.0 kg/cm^{2} (43 lbf/in^{2}), dry sump
- Cooling system: Air

=== Performance ===
- Power output: 180 hp (130 kW) at 2,000 rpm @ sea-level normal
- Compression ratio: 5.75:1
- Specific fuel consumption: 0.335 kg/kW.hr (0.551 lb/hp.hr)
- Power-to-weight ratio: 0.654 kW/kg (0.398 hp/lb)

== See also ==
Comparable engines

- Argus As 17
- de Havilland Gipsy Queen
- Isotta Fraschini Beta
- Menasco Buccaneer

Related lists

- List of aircraft engines
