= Straight engine =

Cylinder layout for a piston engine

Straight / Inline engine
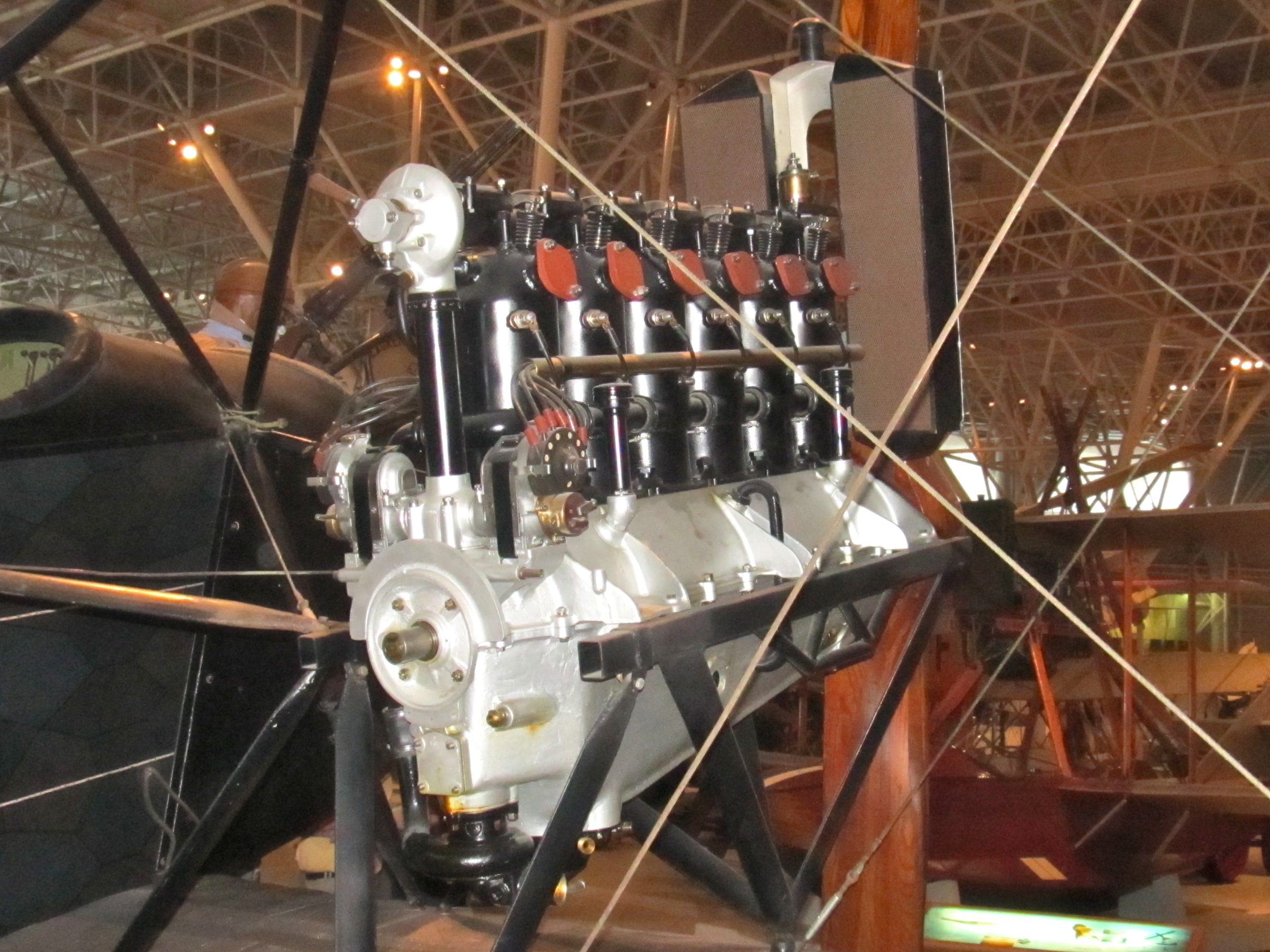
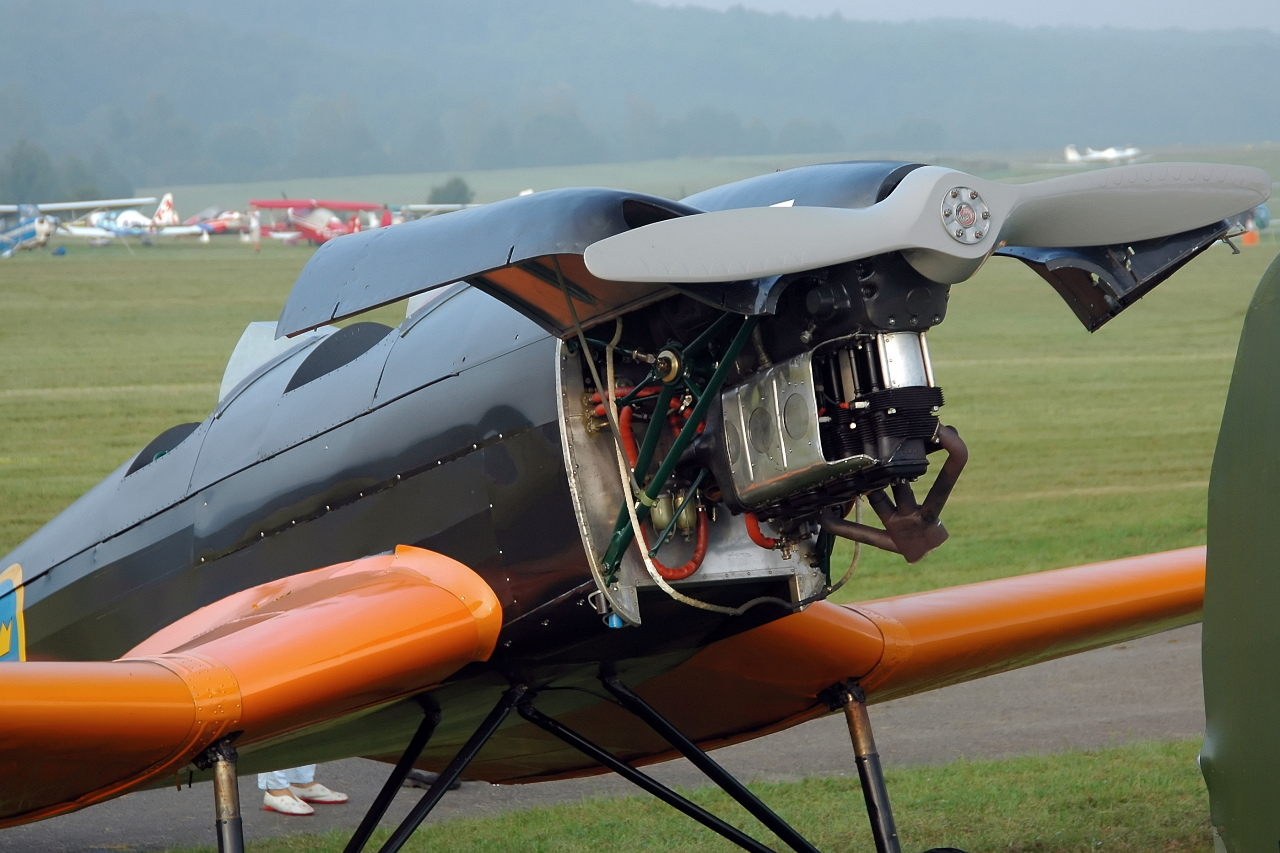
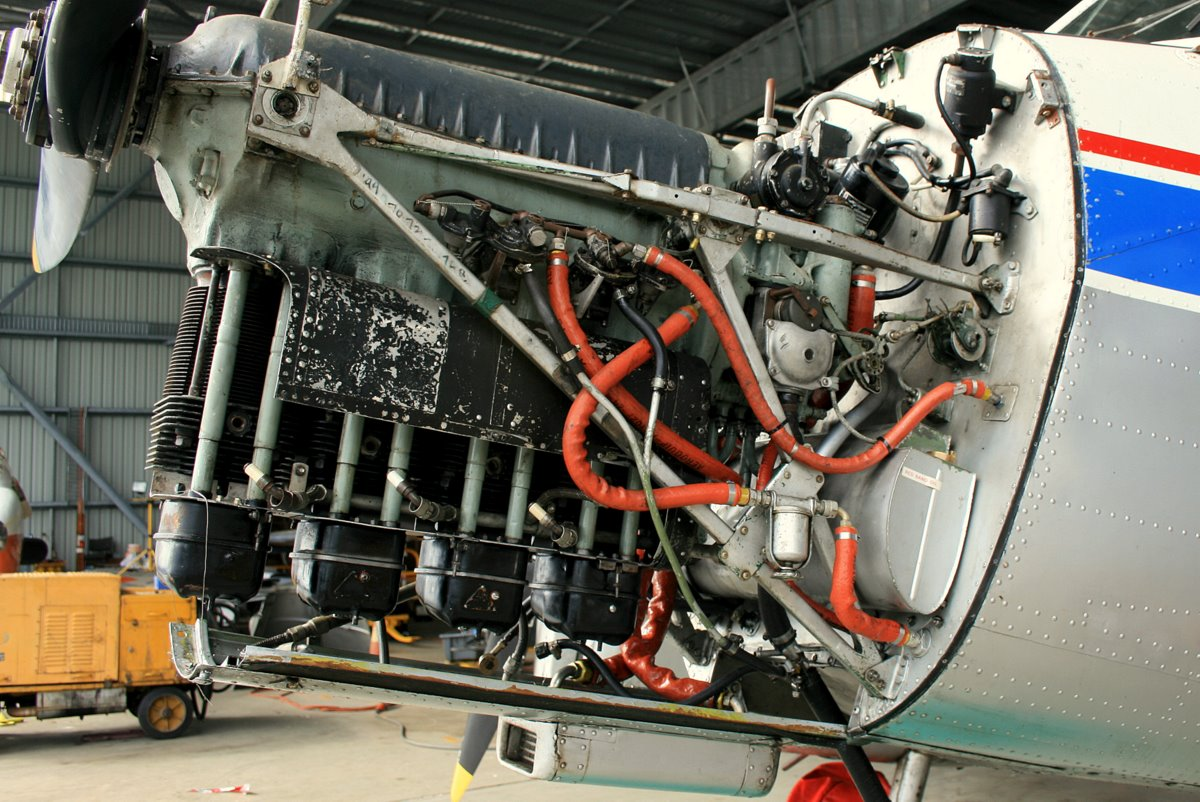
- Upper left: Mercedes D.IIIs on a WW1 AEG G.IV
- Upper right: Inverted straight engine in a Klemm Kl 35
- Lower left: Schematic gif of a straight-8 engine
- Lower right: Inverted Gipsy Major in a DHA-3 Drover

A straight engine, or inline engine, is a configuration of multi-cylinder piston engine where all of the cylinders are arranged in a single row, rather than radially or in two or more cylinder banks.

== Design ==
A straight engine is easier to build than an equivalent flat engine or V engine, as it uses one cylinder head rather than two. Inline engines are also narrower than flat engines or V engines; however, they are longer and can be taller.

The engine balance characteristics of a straight engine depend on the number of cylinders and the firing interval.

=== Slant engines and horizontally-mounted engines ===
When a straight engine is mounted at an angle from the vertical it is called a slant engine. Notable slant engines include the 1959-2000 Chrysler Slant-6 engine, 1961-63 Pontiac Trophy 4 engine and the 1968-1981 Triumph Slant-4 engine.

Some buses and diesel multiple unit trains take this concept further by mounting the engines horizontally (i.e. with a slant angle of 90 degrees). This is used to reduce the height of the engine, so that it can be located under the floor of the train or bus.

=== Number of cylinders ===
- I-twin (also known as "I2")
- I3
- I4
- I5
- I6
- I7
- I8
- I9
- I12
- I14

== Usage in automobiles ==
The straight-three and straight-four configurations are the most common layouts for three- and four-cylinder engines respectively. Straight-five engines are occasionally used, most recently by Audi and Volvo. Straight-six engines were common prior to the 1990s, however most six-cylinder engines now use a V6 layout. Similarly, straight-eight engines were popular in the 1920s to 1940s, however they were replaced by the more compact V8 layout.

== Aviation use ==
Many straight engines have been produced for aircraft, particularly from the early years of aviation and through the interwar period leading up to the Second World War. Straight engines were simpler and had low frontal area, reducing drag, and provided better cockpit visibility.

Straight sixes were especially popular in the First World War, and most German and Italian and some British aircraft used descendants of Daimler's pre-war inline six. Prominent examples include the German Mercedes D.III and BMW IIIa, Italian Isotta Fraschini V.4 and British Siddeley Puma.

The British de Havilland Gipsy family of engines and their descendants included straight-four and straight-six upright and inverted air-cooled engines which were used on a wide range of smaller aircraft around the world, including on the Tiger Moth biplane, and helped made the configuration popular for light aircraft. Menasco and Fairchild-Ranger in the United States, Renault in France, Walter in Czechoslovakia, and Hirth in Germany all built a similar range of engines which were popular in their respective markets.

The aviation use of term "inline engine" is used more broadly than for straight engines, since it also applies to other configurations where the cylinders are located in rows (e.g. V engines, W engines, H engines and horizontally opposed engines).

=== Inverted engines ===
Some straight aircraft engines have used an inverted engine configuration, whereby the crankshaft is at the top of the engine and the pistons hang downwards from it. Advantages of the inverted arrangement include a raised thrust line for improved clearance for the propeller, which either allows for the use of a larger, more efficient propeller, or for shorter undercarriage. Since the thrust line is higher, the engine can be mounted lower in the airframe, improving visibility forward, which is no longer blocked by the cylinder heads. It also allows for a simpler exhaust to keep gasses clear from the cockpit.

== Motorcycle use ==
In motorcycling, the term "in-line" is sometimes used narrowly, for a straight engine mounted in line with the frame. straight, and inline as equivalent, and use them interchangeably.
