= 6Q =

6Q or 6q may refer to:

- 6Q, IATA code for Slovak Airlines
- Renault 6Q, a series of engines by Renault
  - 6Q, a six-cylinder inline engine used in the Nord Pingouin
  - 6Q-01, used in the Caudron Simoun
  - 6Q-09, used in the Caudron Simoun
  - 6Q-10, used in the Nord Noralpha
- 6q, an arm of Chromosome 6 (human)
- Task Group 6Q of the International Telecommunication Union, a developer of PEAQ
- 6Q, the production code for the 1984 Doctor Who serial Planet of Fire

== See also ==
- Q6 (disambiguation)
