= Renault 6Q =

1930s French piston aircraft engine

- Renault 6Q on display at the Polish Aviation Museum
- Type: 6-cylinder inverted air-cooled inline
- National origin: France
- Manufacturer: Renault
- First run: c. 1932
- Number built: >3360

The Renault 6Q, also called the Renault Bengali 6, is an air-cooled inverted in-line six-cylinder, aircraft piston engine, producing about 160 kW (220 hp) continuous power. It was designed and built in France and produced for more than ten years after its homologation in 1936, with large numbers built during World War II.

== Design and development ==
The six-cylinder Renault 6Q and the four-cylinder Renault 4P, both from the early 1930s, shared the same bore, stroke and pistons.

The 6Q was built in both unsupercharged and supercharged forms. The centrifugal supercharger was added at the back of the engine, driven off the crankshaft via step-up gearing. It added 13 kg (29 lb) to the weight and 242 mm (9.5 in) to the length but boosted the performance at altitude to a continuous power of 177 kW (237 hp) at 2,500 rpm and 2,200 m (7,220 ft). Two pre-war models were optimised to different altitudes, the 02/03 right- and left-handed pair to 2,000 m (6,560 ft), with 7.61:1 gearing and the 04/05 pair to 4,000 m (13,120 ft), with 12.274 gearing.

== Operational history ==
The 6Q was homologated in 1936; 1700 were built before the war and 1660 during it. Post-war, production was resumed. The majority of pre-war 6Qs were used in Caudron C.440 Goélands, during the war in Goélands and post-war in Nord's Messerschmitt Bf 108 derived Nord Pingouin, in the Nord Noralpha and Ramier Bf 108 developments.

== Variants ==
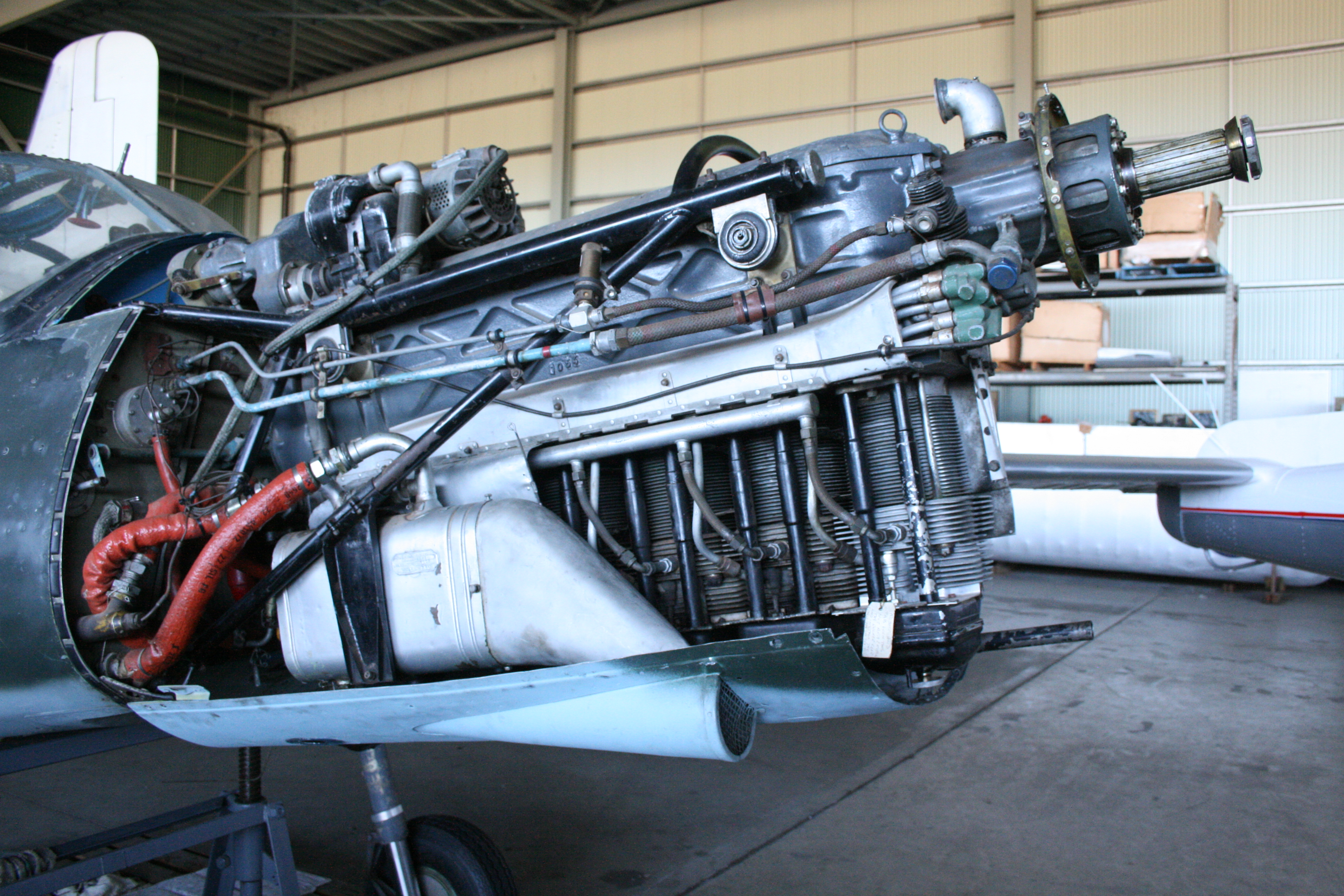
Renault 6Q-10A mounted on a Nord 1002 Pingouin

Even sub-type numbers rotate clockwise, odd numbers anti-clockwise as seen from engine.

Renault 6Q-00/01
Unsupercharged LH/RH rotation
Renault 6Q-02/03
220 hp (160 kW) Supercharged to 2,000 m (6,600 ft) LH/RH rotation
Renault 6Q-04/05
240 hp (180 kW) Supercharged to 4,000 m (13,000 ft) LH/RH rotation
Renault 6Q-06/07
233 hp (174 kW) LH/RH rotation
Renault 6Q-08/09
240 hp (180 kW) LH/RH rotation
Renault 6Q-10/11
230 hp (170 kW) LH/RH rotation
Renault 6Q-18/19
LH/RH rotation
Renault 6Q-20/21
300 hp (220 kW) LH/RH rotation

== Applications ==
- Caudron C.440 Goéland
- Caudron C.631-5 Simoun
- Caudron C.640 Typhon
- Caudron C.690
- Caudron C.860
- Dewoitine HD.730
- Farman F.430
- Hanriot H.230
- Morane-Saulnier MS.350
- Morane-Saulnier MS.501
- Nord 1101/2 Noralpha/Ramier
- Nord Pingouin
- Potez 661
- Rey R.1
- SNCASE SE-700
- SNCASE SE-1210

== Engines on display ==
- Ailes Anciennes, Toulouse: Renault 6Q 10 in a Nord 1101 Ramier I.

== Specifications (post-war unsupercharged) ==
Data from Jane's All the World's Aircraft 1948, p.55d

=== General characteristics ===
- Type: 6-cylinder inverted air-cooled inline
- Bore: 120 mm (4.72 in)
- Stroke: 140 mm (5.51 in)
- Displacement: 9.5 L (580 cu in)
- Length: 1,600 mm (63.0 in)
- Width: 510 mm (20.1 in)
- Height: 920 mm (36.2 in)
- Dry weight: 240 kg (529 lb) dry

=== Components ===
- Valvetrain: One inlet and one exhaust valve per cylinder with Austenitic, driven via tappets, rocker arms and pushrods from a camshaft in the crankcase.
- Fuel system: Twin Zenith carburetters and SEV ignition magnetos; two sparking plugs per cylinder.
- Oil system: Dry sump with pump to crankshaft, camshaft and big ends. Cylinders and pistons splash lubricated.
- Cooling system: Air
- Cylinders: Steel barrels with machined fins aluminium heads with cast fins and hemispherical combustion chamber.
- Pistons: Aluminium alloy forged with four piston rings and floating gudgeon pins. Duralumin connecting rods with white metal big-end bearings and bronze little-end bushes.
- Crankshaft: Forged steel with six throws and seven bearings.
- Crankcase: Aluminium, with magnesium cover and main bearing in crankcase extension.

=== Performance ===
- Power output: Take-off 174 kW (233 hp) at 2,500 rpm; normal 163 kW (218 hp) at 2,500 rpm and 500 m (1,640 ft)
- Compression ratio: 6:1

== See also ==
Related development

- Renault 4P
- Renault 6P
- Renault 12R

Comparable engines

- Alfa Romeo 115
- Argus As 17
- de Havilland Gipsy Queen
- de Havilland Gipsy Six
- Isotta Fraschini Beta
- Menasco Buccaneer

Related lists

- List of aircraft engines
