= Caudron C.440 Goéland =

French aircraft

C.440 Goéland
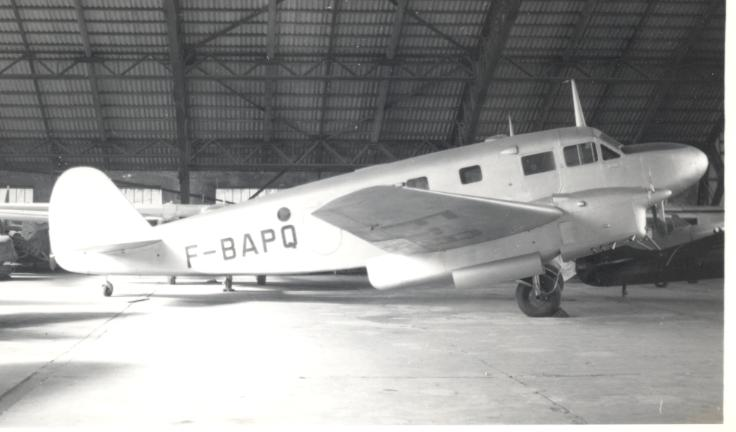
- Caudron C.449 Goeland trainer of Air France at Pontoise-Cormeilles airfield near Paris in May 1957

General information
- Type: Civil utility aircraft
- Manufacturer: Caudron
- Designer: Marcel Riffard
- Number built: 1,702

History
- First flight: 1934

The Caudron C.440 Goéland ("seagull") was a six-seat twin-engine utility aircraft developed in France in the mid-1930s.

== Design and development ==
It was a conventionally configured low-wing cantilever monoplane with tailwheel undercarriage. The main undercarriage units retracted into the engine nacelles. Construction was wooden throughout, with wooden skinning everywhere but the forward and upper fuselage sections, which were skinned in metal. As usually configured, the cabin seated six passengers with baggage compartments fore and aft, and a toilet aft.

== Operational history ==
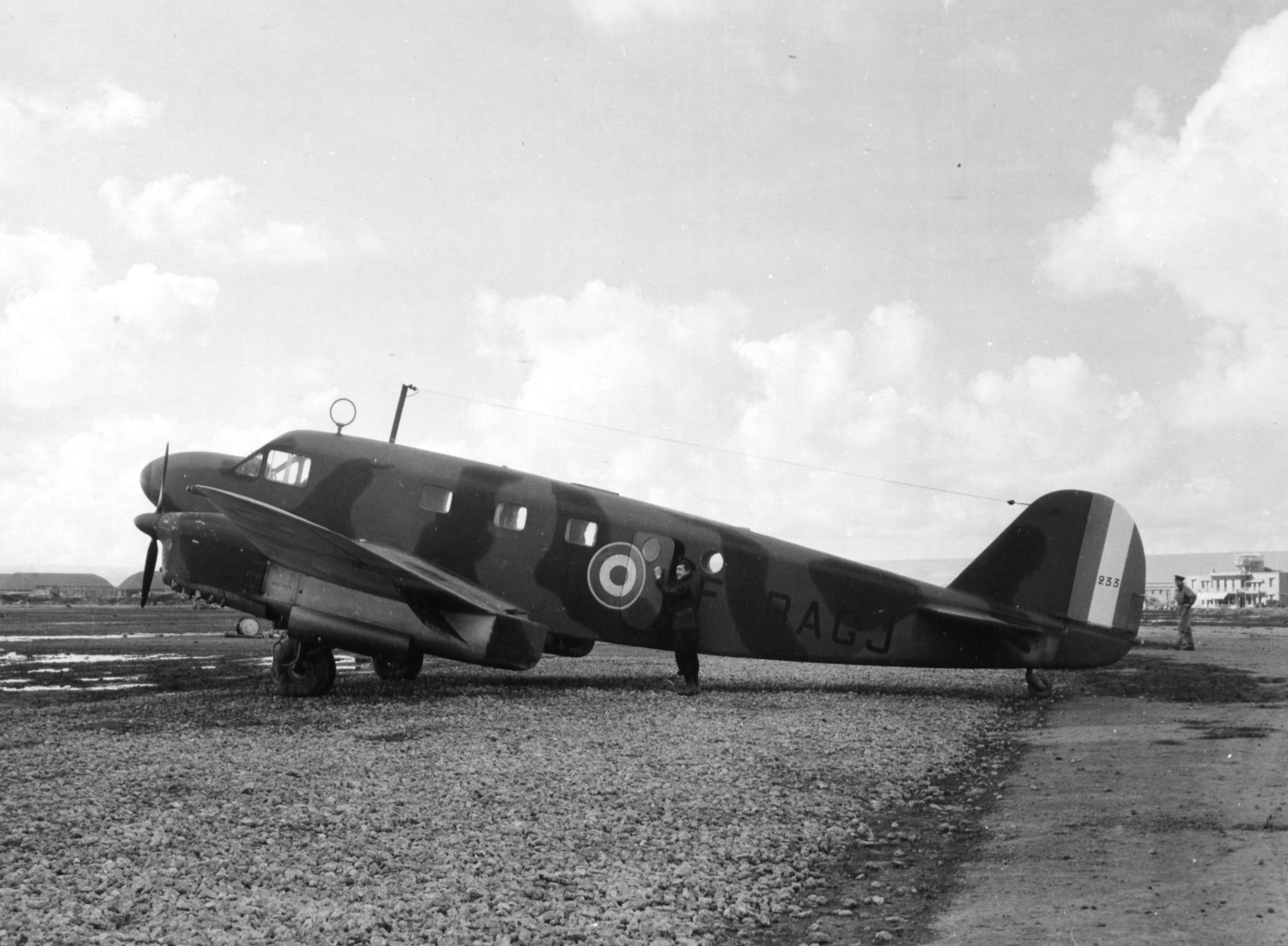
Caudron C.445 in North Africa, 1943

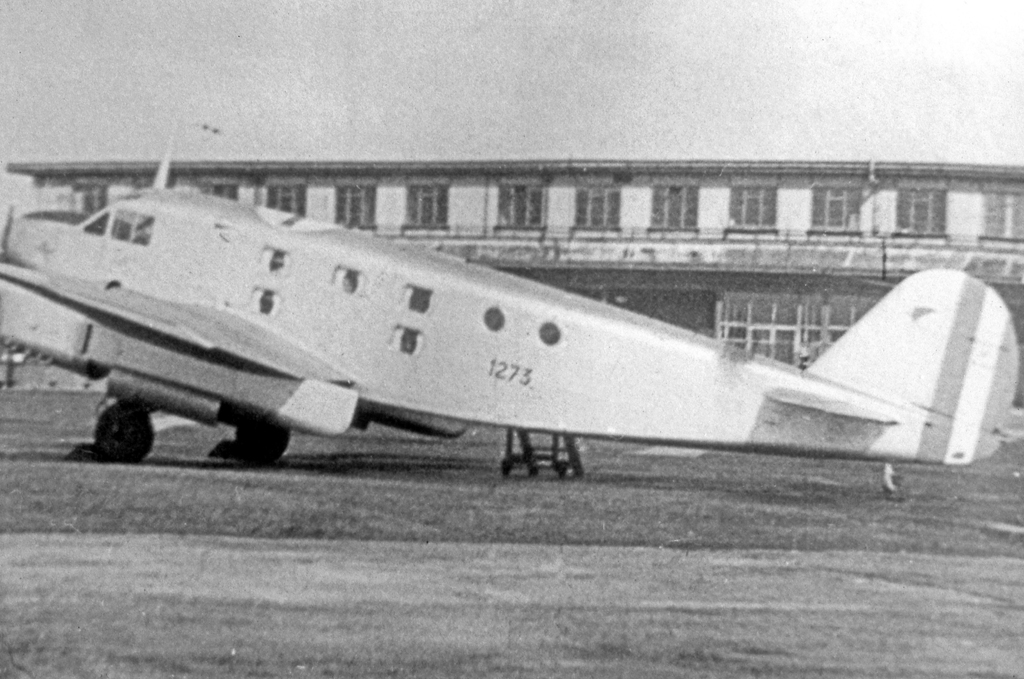
Caudron C.447 Goeland air ambulance of the Armée de l'Air in 1947

Apart from private buyers, the C.440 was also bought by the Armée de l'Air, Aéronavale, Aéromaritime, Régie Air Afrique and Air France, and some were exported for service with Aeroput. Production of the C.440 and its subtypes continued until the outbreak of World War II, at which time many C.440s were impressed into military service. Following the fall of France, some were operated by the German Luftwaffe and Deutsche Luft Hansa. Another user was the Slovak Air Force – it ordered 12 aircraft as the C.445M in 1942.

Production began again after the war for military and civil use as a transport and as a twin-engined trainer. In the postwar reorganisation of the French aircraft industry, Caudron became part of SNCA du Nord and the aircraft became the Nord Goéland; 325 of these were built. Postwar commercial operators included Air France, SABENA, Aigle Azur and Compagnie Air Transport (CAT).

== Variants ==
- C.440 - prototype (three built)
- C.441 - version with Renault 6Q-01 engine and dihedral added to outer wing panel (four built)
- C.444 - first version with counter-rotating propellers, adopted on all later versions (17 built)
- C.445 - similar to C.444, but dihedral of outer wing panels increased (114 built)
  - C.445/1 - two built
  - C.445/2 - three built
  - C.445/3 - postwar production version (510 built)
  - C.445M - militarised version (404 built)
  - C.445R - long-range version (one built)
- C.446 Super Goéland - one built
- C.447 - air ambulance version (31 built)
- C.448 - version with supercharged engines (seven built)
- C.449 - final production version (349 built, including subtypes below)
  - C.449/1
  - C.449/2
  - C.449/3
  - C.449/4 - photographic survey version
  - C.449/5

== Operators ==
Belgium

- Belgian Air Force
- SABENA

Bulgaria

- Bulgarian Air Force

Vichy France

- Vichy French Air Force

France

- Air Bleu
- Aéromaritime
- Aeronavale
- Aigle Azur
- Air France
- Armee de l'Air
- Chargeurs Réunis
- Compagnie Air Transport (CAT)
- Règie Air Afrique

Nazi Germany

- Deutsche Luft Hansa
- Luftwaffe

Spain

- LAPE

Yugoslavia

- Aeroput
- Royal Yugoslav Air Force - One aircraft was impressed into military in April 1940.

Slovak State

- Slovak Air Force (1939–1945)

Spanish Republic

- LAPE
- Spanish Republican Air Force

== Specifications (C.445M) ==
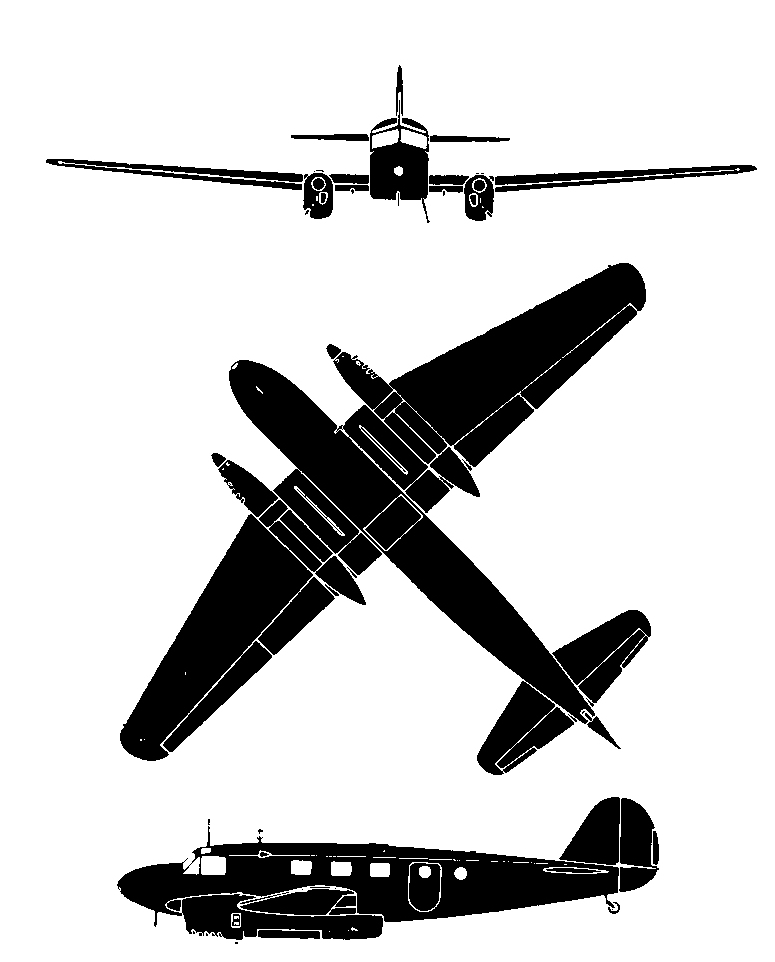
Nord C.449-1 Goeland

General characteristics

- Crew: two pilots
- Length: 13.68 m (44 ft 11 in)
- Wingspan: 17.59 m (57 ft 9 in)
- Height: 3.40 m (11 ft 2 in)
- Wing area: 42.0 m^{2} (452 sq ft)
- Empty weight: 2,292 kg (5,053 lb)
- Gross weight: 3,500 kg (7,716 lb)
- Powerplant: 2 × Renault 6Q , 164 kW (220 hp) each

Performance

- Maximum speed: 300 km/h (186 mph, 162 kn)
- Range: 1,000 km (620 mi, 540 nmi)
- Service ceiling: 7,000 m (23,000 ft)
- Rate of climb: 3.3 m/s (650 ft/min)

== See also ==
Related lists

- List of Interwar military aircraft
- List of aircraft of World War II
- List of aircraft of the Spanish Republican Air Force
