= Caudron C.860 =

Single engine, single seat monoplane

General information
- Type: Long range communication aircraft
- National origin: France
- Manufacturer: Société des Avions Caudron
- Designer: Marcel Riffard
- Primary user: Air Ministry
- Number built: 1

History
- First flight: 6–10 September 1938
- Developed from: Caudron Simoun and Rafale

The Caudron C.860 was a single engine, single seat monoplane ordered by the French government as a long-distance communications aircraft. First flown in 1938, it was also expected to set speed and altitude records but the outbreak of World War II ended developments.

== Design ==
The C.860 was ordered by the French Air Ministry who planned to use it, piloted by André Japy, for rapid long-distance communications. Powered by a 9.5 L (580 cu in) Renault 6Q-03 engine, it had a range of up to 8,000 km (5,000 mi; 4,300 nmi) when cruising at 290 km/h (180 mph; 160 kn). It was also expected to set distance and altitude records in Category 1 with a 8.0 L (490 cu in) Renault engine and in Category 2 with a 6.5 L (400 cu in) Renault, but war intervened.

Its wing and empennage were aerodynamically similar to those of the Caudron Simoun, though the single-piece wing was structurally closer to that of the record-setting Rafale racer. The wing was tetragonal in plan, with more sweep on the trailing edge than on the leading edge, though the tips were semi-elliptical. It had an all-wood structure with a single box spar which incorporated an upper flange of gumbo-limbo, a Central and South American wood of particularly high bulk modulus, together with spruce and plywood ribs. The ply skin was finished with a fabric overlay. Its ailerons were carried on auxiliary spars.

The C.860's fuselage was slender, with a maximum width of only 850 mm (33 in) and about one third of it ahead of the wing leading edge. Its 180 kW (240 hp) 9.5 L (580 cu in) air-cooled six-cylinder Renault 6Q-03 inverted in-line engine, supercharged to 2,000 m (6,600 ft), was in the nose with its main and collector fuel tanks behind it over the centre of gravity. Together with four smaller wing tanks, these gave a fuel capacity of 1,500 L (330 imp gal; 400 US gal). The pilot had an enclosed cockpit with his head raised only slightly above the fuselage under a shallow canopy with a horizontal strip of plexiglas for forwards and sideways vision, a solid top and an extended fairing aft. There were also windows in the fuselage sides for downward views.

The fuselage had a wooden frame with canvas covered sides and curved magnesium sheet top and bottom. The empennage of the C.860 was conventional, with a straight-tapered, blunt-tipped horizontal tail carrying separate elevators. The tall vertical tail had a similar shape though, unlike the elevators, the rudder was balanced. The aircraft had a fixed, tailwheel undercarriage with a 2 m (6 ft 7 in) track. Messier oleo strut landing legs were mounted on the wing spar. Legs, mainwheels and the steerable tailwheel, also on an oleo strut, were enclosed in fairings.

== Development ==
By 5 September 1938 the C.860 had been brought, still not quite complete, from the Caudron factory at Issy-les-Moulineaux to the airfield at Guyancourt. The first flight had been made, piloted by Delmotte, by 10 September. Its initial tests had been completed by the end of September, when the C.860 entered the Centre d'Essais de Matériels Aériens (CEMA), the French official testing centre at Villacoublay. These tests temporarily finished at the beginning of January 1939 but the C.860 returned to CEMA at the end of the month.

With certification complete, the Air Ministry took the C.860 to Istres to determine the take-off run required with the heavy fuel load needed to achieve the desired long range. A 24.5 hour flight at 290 km/h (180 mph), covering 7,100 km (4,400 mi), consumed 1,340 L (290 imp gal; 350 US gal) of petrol and 80 L (18 imp gal; 21 US gal) of oil. The resulting take-off weight of 2,300 kg (5,100 lb), required a take-off run of 650 m (2,130 ft), well within the Air Ministry's 1,000 m (3,300 ft) specification limit.

== Specifications ==
Data from Les Ailes 8 June 1939

General characteristics

- Crew: One
- Length: 8.60 m (28 ft 3 in)
- Wingspan: 10.40 m (34 ft 1 in)
- Height: 3.28 m (10 ft 9 in)
- Wing area: 16 m^{2} (170 sq ft)
- Empty weight: 1,160 kg (2,557 lb)
- Gross weight: 1,650 kg (3,638 lb) for certification tests, up to 2,400 kg (5,300 lb) for distance records
- Fuel capacity: 1,500 L (330 imp gal; 400 US gal)
- Powerplant: 1 × Renault 6Q-03 9.5 L (580 cu in) air-cooled six-cylinder, inverted in-line piston engine, supercharged to 2,000 m (6,600 ft), 180 kW (240 hp)
- Propellers: 2-bladed Ratier, metal, electrically driven variable pitch

Performance

- Maximum speed: 340 km/h (210 mph, 180 kn) at 2,500 m (8,200 ft)
- Cruise speed: 290 km/h (180 mph, 160 kn)
- Range: 7,100 km (4,400 mi, 3,800 nmi) at a weight of 2,300 kg (5,100 lb)
- Take-off distance: 340 m (1,120 ft) at 1,650 kg (3,640 lb); 650 m (2,130 ft) at 2,300 kg (5,100 lb)
