= Sonderkommando Blaich =

German air raid against Fort Lamy in Chad in 1942

The Western Desert campaign
- Part of North African campaign
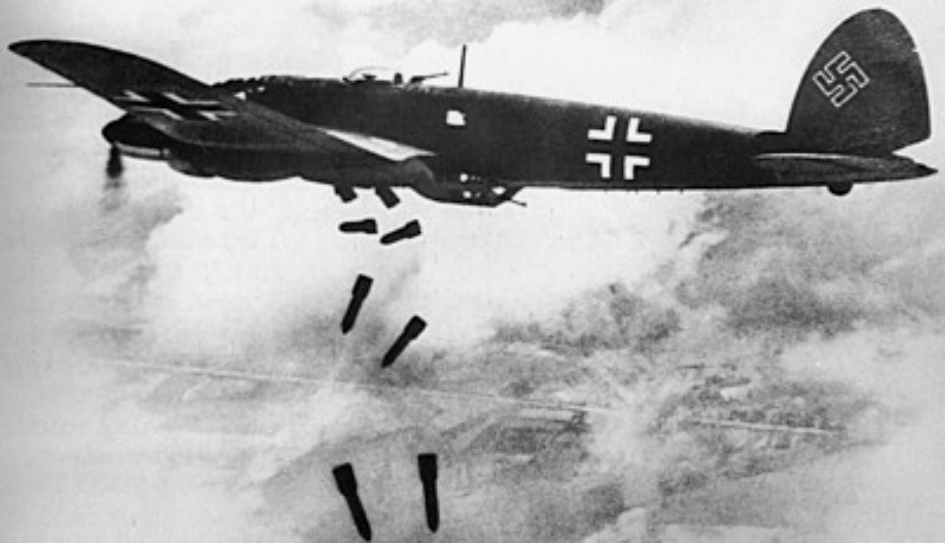
- Example of a Heinkel He 111H dropping bombs during the Battle of Britain in 1940
Date	21 January 1942
Location	Fort Lamy, French Equatorial Africa 12.11°N 15.05°E
Result	Axis victory

Belligerents
Germany; Italy	Free French Forces

Commanders and leaders
Theo Blaich	Philippe Leclerc

Units involved
Fliegerführer Afrika	

Strength
3 aircraft	

Casualties and losses
None	80,000 imp gal (360,000 L; 96,000 US gal) fuel destroyed (Note: Bierman and Smith (2004) wrote that eight British Hurricane fighters were also destroyed.)

Sonderkommando Blaich (Special Command Blaich) was a German unit consisting of a Heinkel He 111H medium bomber supported by an Italian Savoia-Marchetti SM.82 (Marsupiale) transport aircraft and a Messerschmitt Bf 108B (Taifun). In January 1942 the Heinkel raided the Free French–controlled Fort Lamy (now N'Djamena) in the Chad region of French Equatorial Africa. The raid against a target 1,250 mi (2,010 km) from Axis bases in North Africa was a success but on its return flight the Heinkel ran out of fuel and had to make an emergency landing; the crew and aircraft were rescued a week later.

== Background ==
=== Fort Lamy ===
Chad and Fort Lamy had been captured by the Free French in 1940 and was a staging post for the Capture of Kufra, operations against the Kufra oasis group. Sonderkommando Blaich had been conducting operations from an airfield at Hun 400 mi (640 km) south of Tripoli in Libya and from Sabha, 250 mi (400 km) south of Hun against attacks by the British Special Air Service (SAS) and the Long Range Desert Group (LRDG). The British attacked Axis ammunition dumps, fuel dumps, radio stations, airfields and other rear units. An important LRDG base was the Free French airfield at Fort Lamy on the banks of Lake Chad, which was also part of the Royal Air Force delivery route from RAF Takoradi in Ghana, to Egypt.

=== Theo Blaich ===
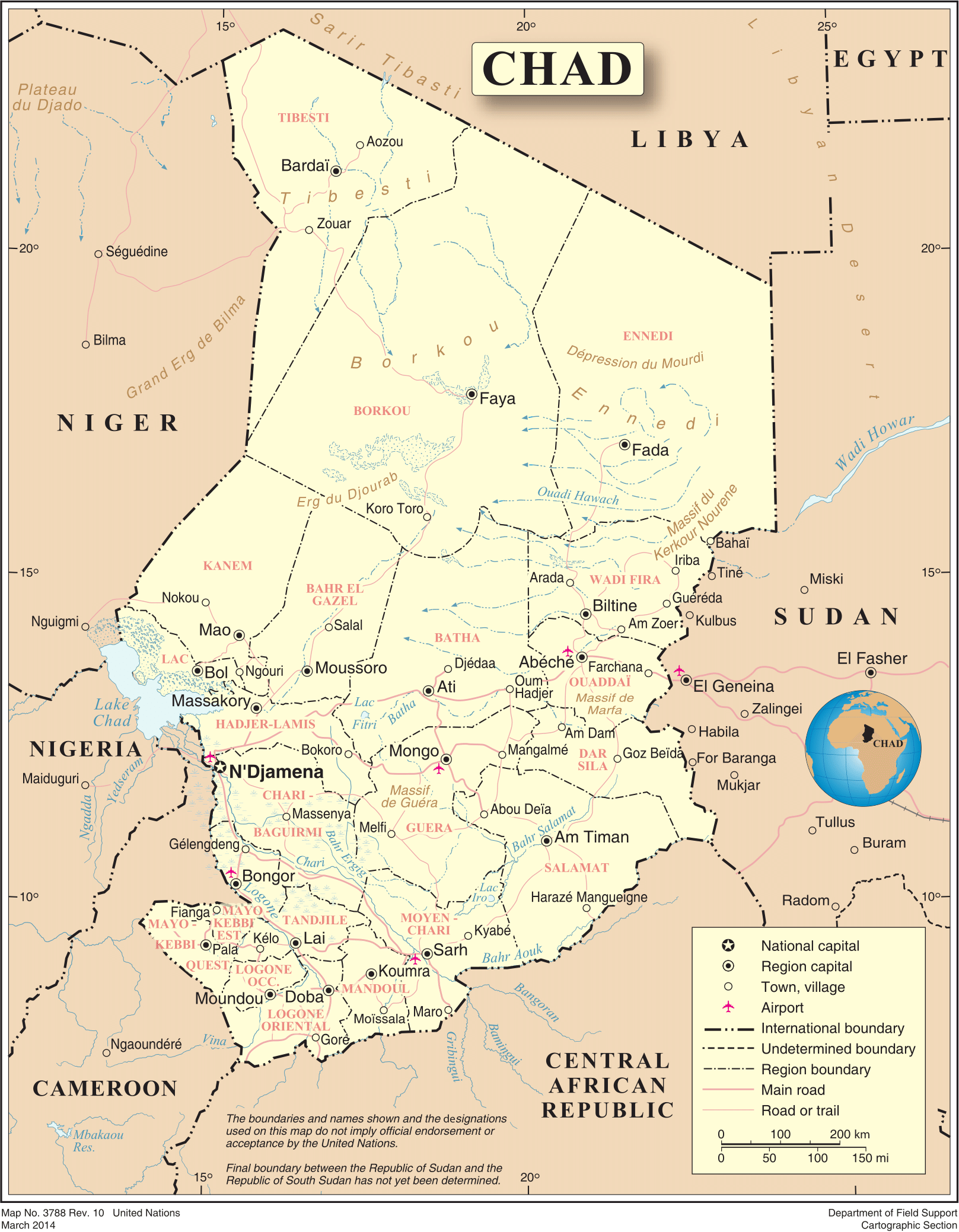
UN map of Chad; Fort Lamy (now N'Djamena) is on the Cameroon border.

Theo Blaich was a German adventurer and plantation owner who had joined the Wehrmacht in 1939, arriving in his own Messerschmitt Bf 108B Taifun (Typhoon) KG+EM. Blaich understood the importance of Fort Lamy as a way station in the overland transport and communication route from the west coast of Africa to the Nile, as well as a base for Allied operations against Libya. Blaich proposed the capture of Fort Lamy to safeguard the southern border of Libya. When his suggestions were dismissed, he suggested that he should at least carry out a bombing raid. General Erwin Rommel approved the idea and forwarded it to Generalmajor Stefan Fröhlich the Fliegerführer Afrika. The date for the operation was set for 21 January 1942, to coincide with an Axis attack against the British at El Agheila.

== Prelude ==
=== Plan ===
Sonderkommando Blaich was an Axis force comprising German and Italian personnel, equipped with a He 111H-6 from II/Kampfgeschwader 4 with all excess equipment, including the dorsal and ventral guns removed, a Savoia-Marchetti SM.82 (Marsupiale) transport aircraft carrying extra fuel for the Heinkel and Blaich's Taifun, which were to depart from the oasis of Hun on 20 January. The Heinkel crew and Blaich were to go on the raid, while the Italian support crew, except for the pilot, Maggiore (Major) Roberto Count Vimercati-San Severino, stayed behind.

=== Bir Misciuro ===
The Sonderkommando flew to Camp 1 (Campo Uno) a remote natural airstrip in southern Libya at Bir Misciuro, which had been discovered by Vimercati-San Severino in 1935, when he landed there during a safari. He had surveyed and marked out the site later but it had no facilities. The Marsupiale was used as the supply base and the Heinkel was refuelled by hand from fuel drums. The members of the expedition who were to fly on the operation were Hauptmann Theo Blaich, pilot of the Bf 108B Taifun and raid commander, Leutnant Franz Bohnsack, pilot of the He 111, Feldwebel Heinrich Geissler, navigator, Unteroffizier Wolfgang Wichmann, wireless operator, Leutnant Fritz Dettmann, war correspondent and Maggiore Roberto Count Vimercati-San Severino, desert expert and pilot of the Marsupiale.

== Raid ==
=== Outward flight ===
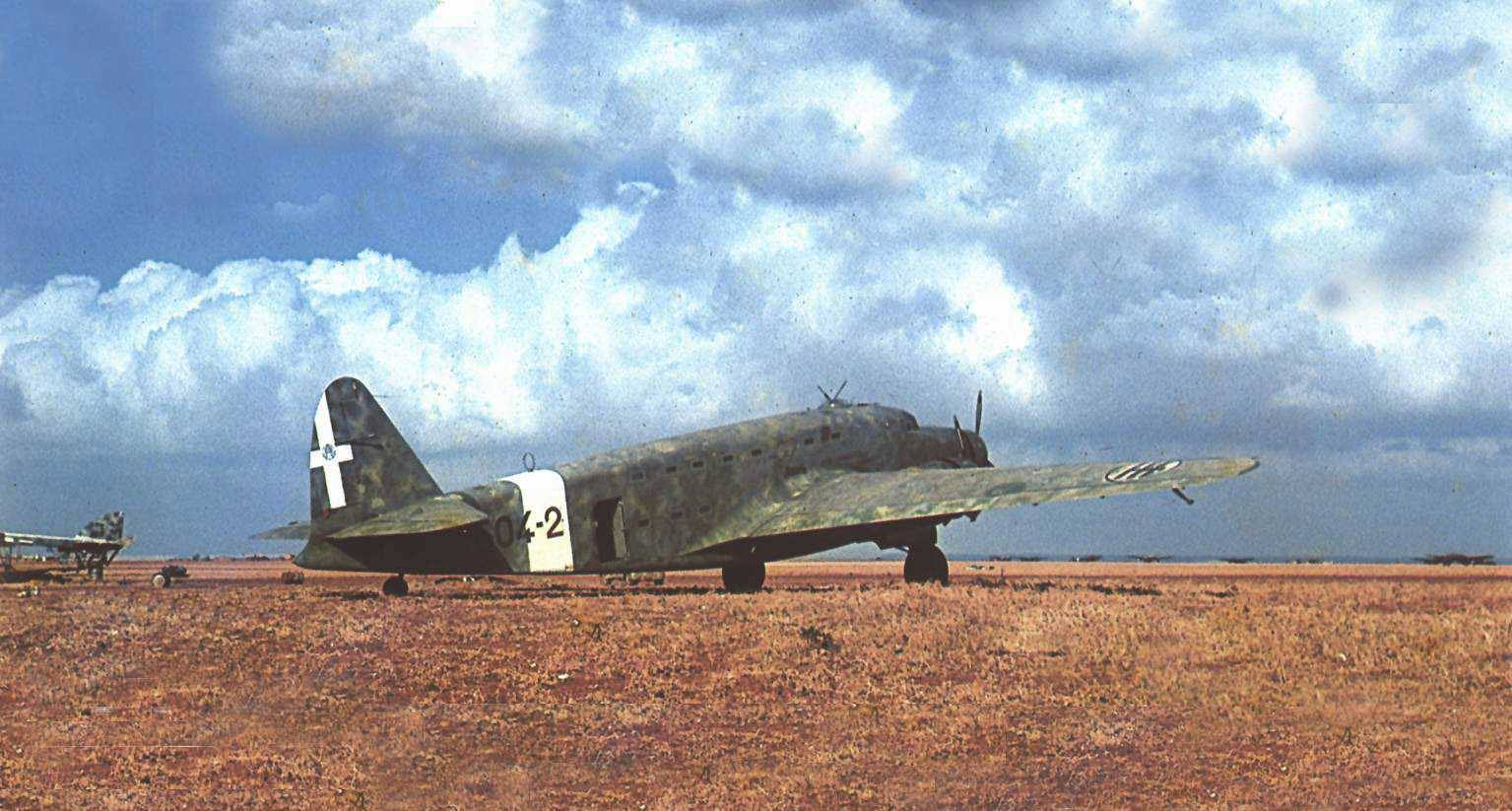
Example of a Savoia-Marchetti SM.82 (Marsupiale)

The Heinkel He 111 took off from Campo Uno at 08:00 on 21 January but experienced bad weather, contrary to the weather forecast. The aircraft had been loaded with 1,000 imp gal (4,500 L; 1,200 US gal) of fuel but the weather increased fuel consumption. Geissler had to use dead reckoning and radio stations from which he could get a direction finding (D/F) fix. Hours later, Geissler realised that he was more than 100 mi (160 km) off course and ordered a turn to the west to the Chari River and flew along it to Fort Lamy at the confluence of the Chari and Logone rivers where they join Lake Chad. The Heinkel reached the lake by noon, after which navigation became easier, despite the storm intensifying. At 14:30, flying at 1,500 ft (460 m), the Heinkel reached Fort Lamy. Being so remote, the airfield and supply depot had no air defences. The Heinkel crew could not delay and made one bombing run. Sixteen 220 lb (100 kg) bombs were dropped unhindered on the fuel dump at the edge of the airfield. The French forces were too surprised to fight back and 80,000 imp gal (360,000 L; 96,000 US gal) of fuel and all of the oil were destroyed. (Note: Eight Hurricane fighters might also have been destroyed.)

=== Return journey ===
The Heinkel was undamaged and turned northwards but the crew knew that the detour made it impossible to reach Campo Uno with the fuel remaining. The engines were run at the leanest mixture possible and at 1,950 rpm to fly as far as possible. Wireless contact with the Italian support crew had been lost on the outbound leg and could not be re-established. At 18:00, towards sunset, 160 mi (260 km) short of Campo Uno, Bohnsack made an emergency landing on a high plateau. The crew of six men had 4.4 imp gal; 5.3 US gal (20 L) of water remaining. Wichmann, the wireless operator, set up his 3-Watt wireless aerial, laying it out on tent poles. On 6,197 kHz (48.37 m), Wichmann managed to contact a wireless operator at the headquarters of Fliegerführer Afrika in Benghazi, 650 mi (1,050 km) to the north. The Italian support crew was still out of contact and three days later, Benghazi sent a message that the Italians had been contacted and that they were searching for the Heinkel. On the fifth day, the crew transmitted a D/F signal with the Heinkel wireless, running one engine with the little fuel that remained, to power the wireless generator. Within the hour an Italian Caproni Ca.309 (Ghibli) landed with water and melons for the Heinkel crew. On the next day a Junkers Ju 52 from Wüstennotstaffel 1 (Desert Rescue Squadron 1) arrived with more water and fuel. The crew took off for the short journey to Campo Uno, where the Heinkel was refuelled and then the crew flew on to Hun.

== Aftermath ==
Map of the traditional provinces of Libya, showing Fezzan in the south

The attack on Fort Lamy caused minor damage to installations and few casualties but destroyed fuel supplies, despite strenuous efforts to save them, reducing the supply of the Free French and the RAF in the region by half. The raid caused General Philippe Leclerc to strengthen the anti-aircraft defences at Fort Lamy and to start hit-and-run operations against the Italian forces in the Fezzan region of Libya. Sonderkommando Blaich continued operations against the LRDG during the first half of 1942. In June 1942 the Heinkel crashed near Kufra after an engine failure. The crew was rescued four days later but had to set the Heinkel on fire and this ended the Sonderkommando's operations.

== Bibliography ==
- Bierman, J.; Smith, C. (2004) [2002]. Alamein. War without Hate: The Dersert Campaign of 1940–1943 (prev. pub. The Battle of Alamein by Viking Penguin, New York ed.). London: Penguin. ISBN 978-0-14-200394-7.
- Moore, William Mortimer (2011). Free France's Lion: The Life of Philippe Leclerc, de Gaulle's Greatest General. Newbury: Casemate Publishers. ISBN 978-1-61200-080-0.
- Oliver, David (2013) [2005]. Airborne Espionage: International Special Duty Operations in the World Wars (e-book ed.). Stroud: The History Press. ISBN 978-0-7524-9552-1.
- Pallud, Jean Paul (2021) [2012]. The Desert War: The Campaign in North Africa 1940–43, Then and Now (After the Battle (Pen & Sword, Barnsley) ed.). London: Battle of Britain International. ISBN 978-1-870067-77-5.
- Windrow, M. C. (1965). The Heinkel He 111H. Profile Publications (No. 15). Leatherhead: Profile Publications. OCLC 705834365.
