= Rey R.1 =

- The first Rey R.1. The dark oblique lines under the wings are the rubber hinges.

General information
- Type: Experimental aircraft
- National origin: France
- Designer: Francois Rey
- Number built: 2

History
- First flight: 16 December 1949

The Rey R.1 was an experimental twin engine aircraft type built in France around 1950 to test the effectiveness of sprung hinged wings in automatically correcting roll caused by gusts.

== Design and development ==
In the 1930s there was some interest in aircraft designs with automatic gust stabilization, one example being the Italian Jona J-6. In 1938 Francois Rey and M. Ruoanet took out a patent on another stabilization method in which the wings could hinge near their roots along a line oblique to the span. This meant that when a tip dropped the wing hinged upwards, increasing its angle of attack and hence its lift, restoring the aircraft to level flight. An aircraft with this feature was built but destroyed during World War II.

After the war Rey built a two-seat, twin engine light aircraft to test the principle of the patent. Its low cantilever wing was tapered to rounded tips and had aspect ratio of 10 and noticeable dihedral. Renault 6Q 164 kW (220 hp) six cylinder air-cooled inverted inline engines were mounted on the wing undersides in deep long cowlings. The rubber disc sprung hinges began immediately outboard of the rear engine cowling on the wing trailing edge and ran forward and outward to the leading edge at about 45° to the chord. Black sealing strip shows their position in photographs. The R.1's long ailerons were mounted outboard of the hinge, starting close to the hinge connection with the trailing edge.

The rest of the R.1 was completely conventional with an oval fuselage, single seat enclosed cockpit and a second seat behind in a windowed cabin. The tailplane was straight edged and tapered with strong dihedral and carried twin vertical tails, oval in profile, at its extreme tips. It had a tailwheel undercarriage with the main wheels in spats on short faired vertical legs from the engine cowlings.

Two R.1s were built, numbered 01 and 02. 01 flew for the first time on 12 December 1949 and 02, which had enlarged fins, on 3 July 1951. 01 was exhibited in flight at the Le Bourget Fête in 1951, where it exhibited its flexing wings and braking parachute. No development or application followed these two aircraft.

== Variants ==
Rey R.1 01
First flown 6 December 1949.
Rey R.1 02
As 01 but with larger fins. First flown 3 January 1951.

== Specifications ==
Data from Gaillard (1990) p. 96

General characteristics

- Crew: Two
- Length: 9.20 m (30 ft 2 in)
- Wingspan: 13.175 m (43 ft 3 in)
- Height: 3.65 m (12 ft 0 in)
- Wing area: 19.33 m^{2} (208.1 sq ft)
- Empty weight: 2,550 kg (5,622 lb)
- Gross weight: 2,950 kg (6,504 lb)
- Powerplant: 2 × Renault 6Q 6-cylinder air-cooled inverted inline, 160 kW (220 hp) each
- Propellers: 2-bladed

Performance

- Maximum speed: 325 km/h (202 mph, 175 kn)
- Service ceiling: 5,800 m (19,000 ft)
