= SNCASE SE-1210 =

SE-1210

General information
- Type: Experimental flying boat
- National origin: France
- Manufacturer: SNCASE
- Number built: 1

History
- First flight: 9 June 1948
- Retired: 1952

The SNCASE SE-1210 was an experimental French flying-boat designed and built by SNCASE as a flying scale model of the proposed SE-1200 transatlantic flying boat.

== Design and development ==
Following the end of the Second World War, the French aircraft manufacturer SNCASE proposed a very large, long-range flying boat, the SE-1200, which was intended to carry 125 passengers across the Atlantic Ocean. The SE-1200, with a wingspan of 61 m (200.1 ft) and a maximum takeoff weight of 140,000 kg (310,000 lb) and powered by eight 3,000–3,400 hp (2,200–2,500 kW) Arsenal 24H engines in four tandem pairs (the Arsenal 24H was a 24-cylinder H-24 engine based on components of the Junkers Jumo 213), would have been one of the largest aircraft in the world if completed.

To enable aerodynamic tests of the design a flying scale model approximately one-third size was built. The resultant SE-1210 was powered by four 240 hp (179 kW) Renault 6Q in-line piston engines. The SE-1210, registered F-WEPI, first flew on 9 June 1948 on the Étang de Berre near SNCASE's factory at Marignane, Marseille. After modification it was passed to the Centre d'essais en vol (CEV) for further testing which continued from December 1948 to April 1949. Following the cancellation of the SE-1200 project, testing of the SE-1210 was abandoned, with it being flown for the last time in March 1951, with the flying boat being scrapped in 1952.

== Specification ==
Data from French Postwar Transport Aircraft

General characteristics

- Length: 16.35 m (53 ft 8 in)
- Wingspan: 21.75 m (71 ft 4 in)
- Gross weight: 5,461 kg (12,039 lb)
- Powerplant: 4 × Renault 6Q six-cylinder inline inverted piston engine, 180 kW (240 hp) each

Performance

- Maximum speed: 340 km/h (210 mph, 180 kn)

== See also ==
- List of flying boats

== Bibliography ==
- Bridgman, Leonard (1948). Jane's All the World's Aircraft 1948. London: Sampson Low, Marston & Company, Ltd.
- Chillon, Jacques; Dubois, Jean-Pierre & Wegg, John (1980). French Post-War Transport Aircraft. Tonbridge, UK: Air-Britain. ISBN 0-85130-078-2.
- de Narbonne, Roland (June 2008). "Juin 1948, dans l'aéronautique française: Enfin des matériels nouveaux". Le Fana de l'Aviation (in French). No. 463. pp. 76–79.
