= Q6 =

Q6 can refer to:

- the former on-air branding of KHQ-TV, the NBC affiliate in Spokane, Washington, USA
- the second series of Spike Milligan's Q series, originally aired in 1975
- the IATA airline designator for Aero Condor Peru
- Q6 Trivia Game, run by Microsoft to promote Windows Live Messenger
- The Q6 (New York City bus)
- Nanchang Q-6 (aircraft), a cancelled Chinese derivative of the Mikoyan-Gurevich MiG-23 Soviet military aircraft
- LNER Class Q6, a class of British steam locomotives
- Quran 6, al-anʿām, the 6th chapter of the Islamic Holy book
- Audi Q6, a sport utility vehicle

== See also ==
- 6Q (disambiguation)
