= Messerschmitt Bf 108 Taifun =

German single-engine sport and touring aircraft

Bf 108 Taifun
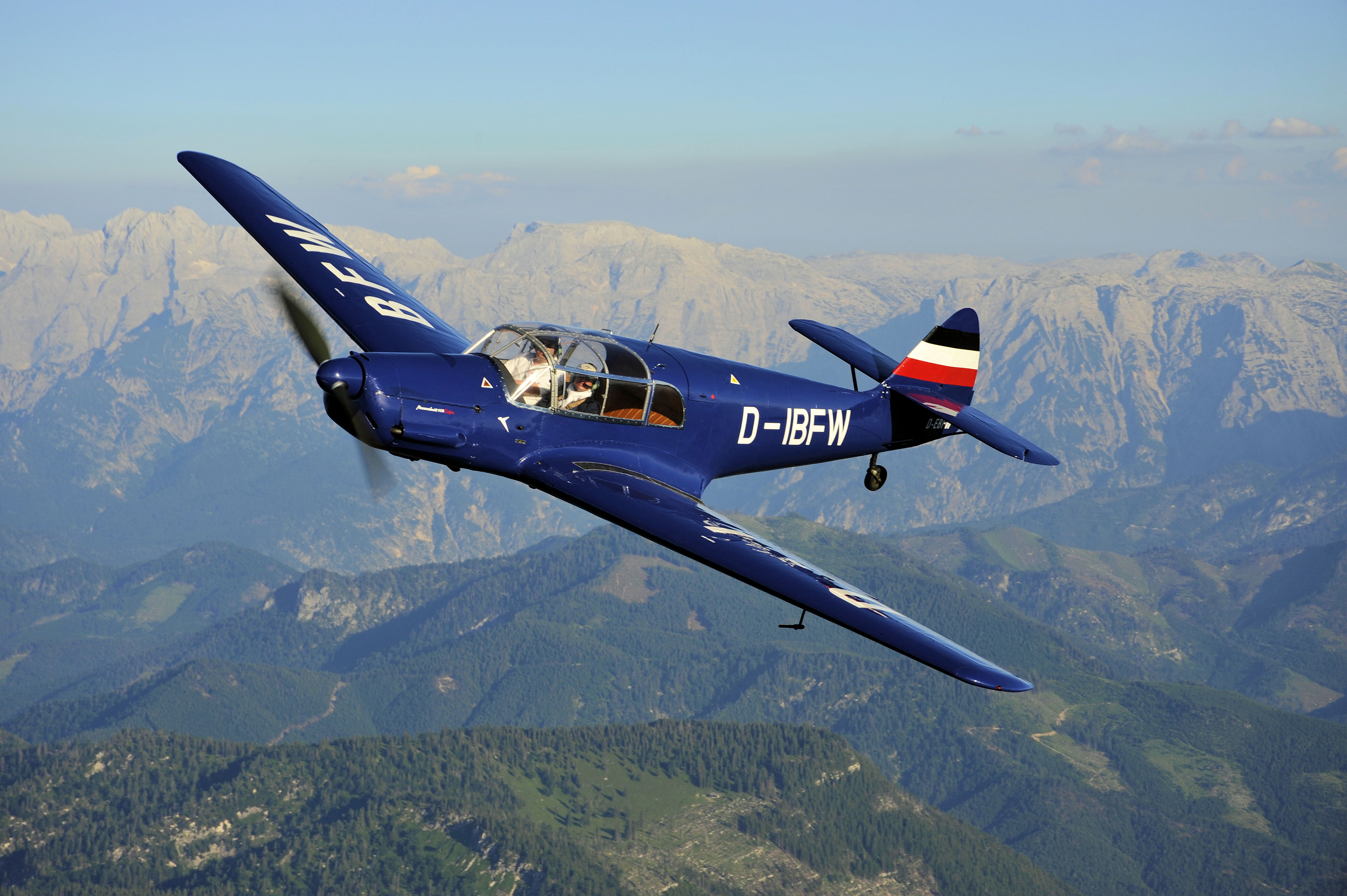
- D-EBFW, a 1937-built Bf 108B-1 painted to represent a pre-war company demonstrator D-IBFW

General information
- Type: Sport and touring aircraft
- Manufacturer: Bayerische Flugzeugwerke
- Designer: Willy Messerschmitt
- Primary users: Luftwaffe Armée de l'Air; Manchukuo National Airways
- Number built: 885

History
- Introduction date: 1935
- First flight: Spring 1934
- Retired: 1945
- Variants: Nord 1000 Pingouin; Nord Noralpha

The Messerschmitt Bf 108 Taifun (English: Typhoon) is a single-engine sport and touring aircraft designed and produced by the German aircraft manufacturer Bayerische Flugzeugwerke (BFW). Introduced in 1935, it was the first aircraft of its size to feature all-metal stressed skin construction.

== Design and development ==
During 1933, the German aircraft manufacturer Bayerische Flugzeugwerke (BFW) received a contract from the Reichsluftfahrtministerium (RLM/German Aviation Ministry) to produce an aircraft to compete in the 4th Challenge International de Tourisme (1934). The resulting aircraft, which was internally designated as M 37 and subsequently received the official designation Bf 108, was a four-seat sports/recreation aircraft designed by the aeronautical engineer Willy Messerschmitt.

In terms of its design, the Bf 108 represented a departure from many of the company's existing design practices; foremost of which, it was the first aircraft of its size to use all-metal stressed skin construction. The wing featured a patented single-spar design and was equipped with both trailing edge flaps and leading-edge slats, the latter of which deployed automatically when the aircraft neared stall conditions. Initially, all of the flight control surfaces were hinged at their leading edges without any application of dynamical balancing. The legs of the main undercarriage pivoted near the wingroot to retract outwards into wells that almost entirely enclosed them. The aircraft was initially powered by a 250 PS (247 hp, 184 kW) Hirth HM 8U 8.0 litre displacement, air-cooled inverted-V8 engine, which drove a three-blade propeller.

By 1934, six aircraft had been produced. During spring 1934, the prototype Bf 108 conducted its maiden flight; the ensuring flight test programme was relatively smooth. Even during these early flights, the aircraft proved to be relatively safe yet quick, possessing excellent low-speed flight characteristics and being pleasant to fly. Furthermore, the aircraft's metal structure proved to be fairly maintenance-friendly.

During 1934, the first production-standard model, designated Bf 108A, made its first flight. One year later, it was followed by the Bf 108B, which was powered by the substantially larger, 12.67 litre displacement Argus As 10 air-cooled inverted V8 engine. Various other design changes on this model include a revised fin shape, elimination of the upper bracings of the tailplane, the adoption of a tailwheel in place of a skid, and the dynamic balancing of both the elevator and rudder. Only a few Bf 108Bs were completed prior to production of the type being transferred to a new plant in Regensburg. Serial production proceeded at a pace; by 1942, in excess of 500 aircraft had been completed.

The nickname Taifun (German for "typhoon") came from the German pilot Elly Beinhorn, who had given it to her personal aircraft; it was generally adopted thereafter.

During 1941, the Bf 108C was proposed as a specialised aircraft, to be equipped with the powerful Hirth HM 512 inverted-V supercharged air-cooled engine, that was intended to achieve record-breaking performance. However, it was passed over for the Me 208, an enlarged version that featured numerous alterations and improvements, including a retractable tricycle landing gear. Only a pair of prototypes were completed before the end of the Second World War.

== Operational history ==
As planned, the BF 108 participated in the 4th Challenge International de Tourisme. Although it was outperformed by several other aircraft in the competition, the performance of the type marked it as a popular choice for record flights. Particular among these traits was its low fuel consumption, good handling and superb takeoff and landing characteristics. During the pre-war years, the type was widely flown by private pilots, several of whom were flying officers in Luftwaffe. The majority of aircraft produced went into German ownership, in excess of 50 Bf 108Bs were exported to countries such as Bulgaria, Hungary, Japan, Romania, Switzerland, Yugoslavia, and the Soviet Union.

The type's appearances at various parts of the world helped to bolster the reputation of Messerschmitt and the German aeronautical sector in general. In the mid-to-late 1930s, the Bf 108 was a common sight at aerial competitions, commonly in either first or second place in events such as the 1937 Oases rally in Egypt and the 1938 Belgian international Queen Astrid Race. During July 1939, one aircraft established a new altitude class record of 9,075 m (29,774 ft).

Early on in the Second World War, the Bf 108 was formally introduced to service with the Luftwaffe. As a military aircraft, the type was primarily used as a personnel transport and liaison aircraft, ferrying pilots and personnel between air bases. It was also operated by the Luftdienst, where it was typically used to perform target towing and supply operations. The aircraft involved in the Mechelen Incident was a Bf 108 and one served with the small long-range bombing group Sonderkommando Blaich based in Africa.

Mid-way through the conflict, production of the Bf 108 was transferred from Germany to Les Mureaux in occupied France. After the war, these assembly lines remained in the possession of the French aircraft manufacturer SNCAN; that continued production of the type as the Nord 1000 Pingouin. Many of the postwar movie portrayals of the Bf 108 have been performed by the French-built derivatives of the type, which include the Pingouin and the further-improved Nord Noralpha.

== Variants ==
Bf 108A

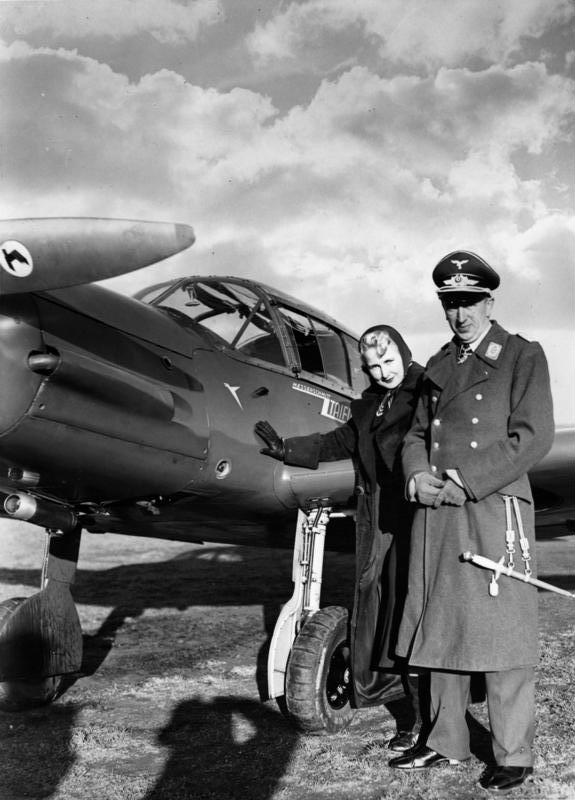
Theo Osterkamp and his wife, Fel Gudrun, with a Messerschmitt Bf 108 (1938)

Initial version designed in 1934 for use in Challenge 1934. Six were built with the Hirth HM 8U, one other initially had a 220 PS (217 hp, 162 kW) Argus As 17B inline engine and later a 160 PS (158 hp, 118 kW) Siemens-Halske Sh 14 radial.
Bf 108B
Revised version, built from late 1935. The prototype had a Siemens-Halske Sh 14A radial, but production machines used the 240 PS (237 hp, 177 kW) Argus As 10C or the 270 PS (266 hp, 199 kW) Argus As 10E. A quadrant-shaped rather than rectangular rear window, tailwheel replacing skid, revision of shape of empennage and removal of tailplane upper bracing.
Bf 108C
Proposed high-speed version, powered by a 400 PS (395 hp, 294 kW) Hirth HM 512 engine. Probably not built.
Me 208
Improved and enlarged version with a retractable tricycle landing gear. Two prototypes were built by SNCAN (Nord) in France during the war. After 1945 Nord continued its production as the Nord Noralpha.
Nord 1000 Pingouin
Bf 108 built during and after the war by SNCAN in France; followed by the Nord 1001, that had only minor variations and the Nord 1002, which used a Renault engine.
Nord 1100 Noralpha
Bf 108 derivative built after the war by SNCAN in France with tricycle landing gear and a Renault engine.

== Operators ==
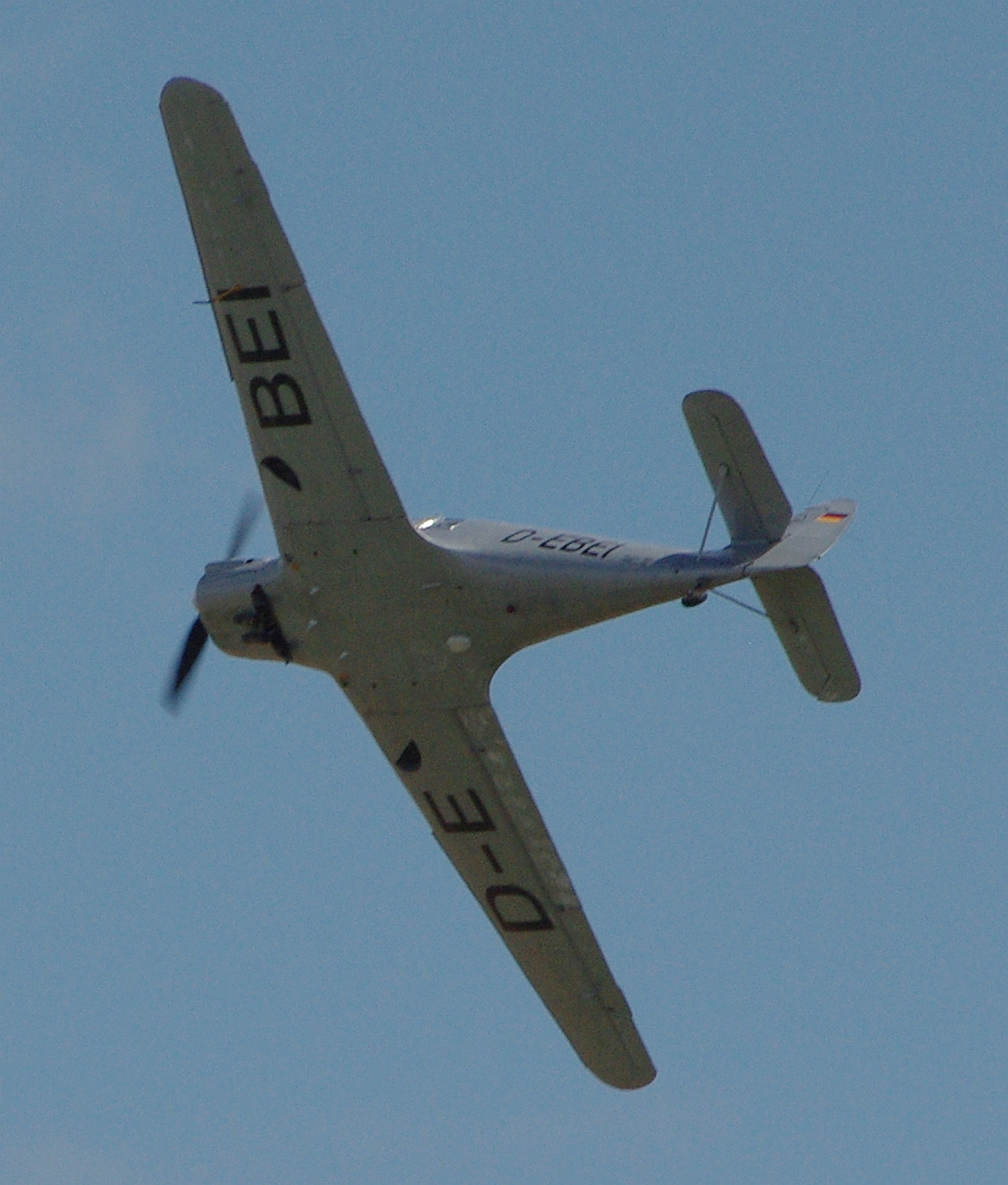
Bf 108 B-1, Lufthansa's D-EBEI at Duxford 2009

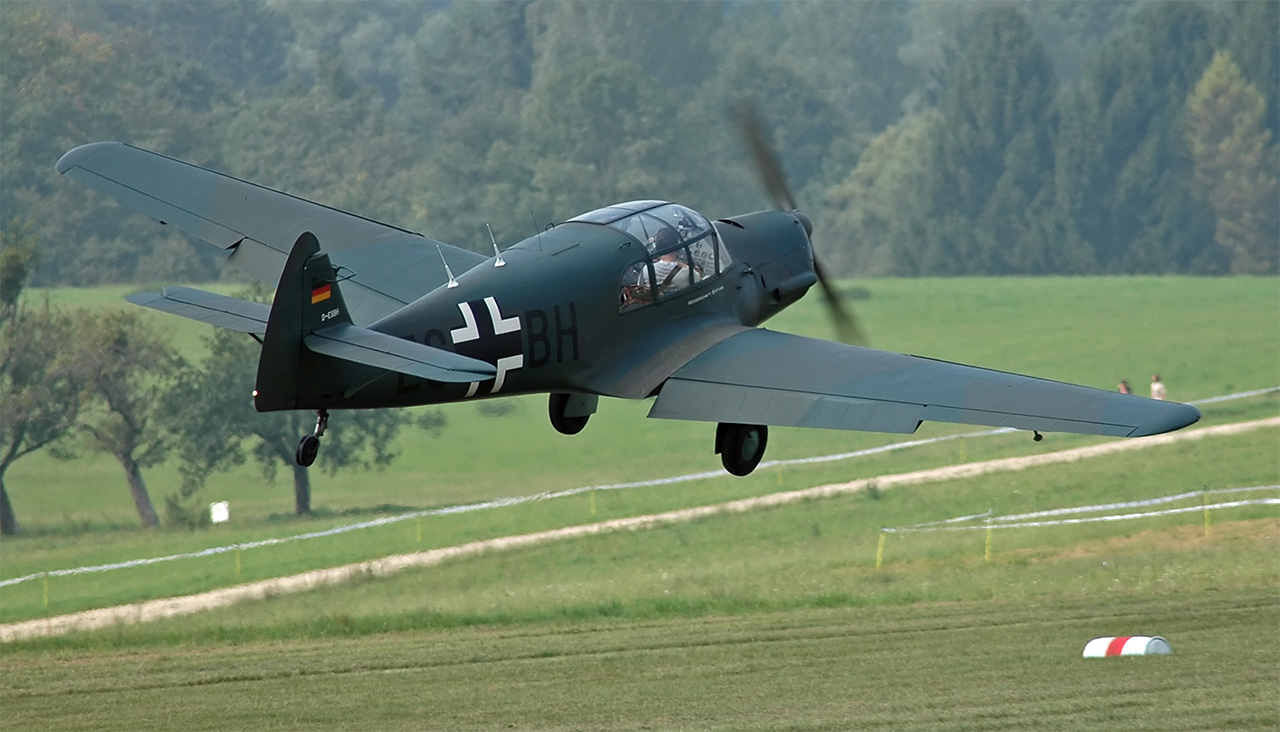
Bf 108B Taifun, Messerschmitt-Stiftung

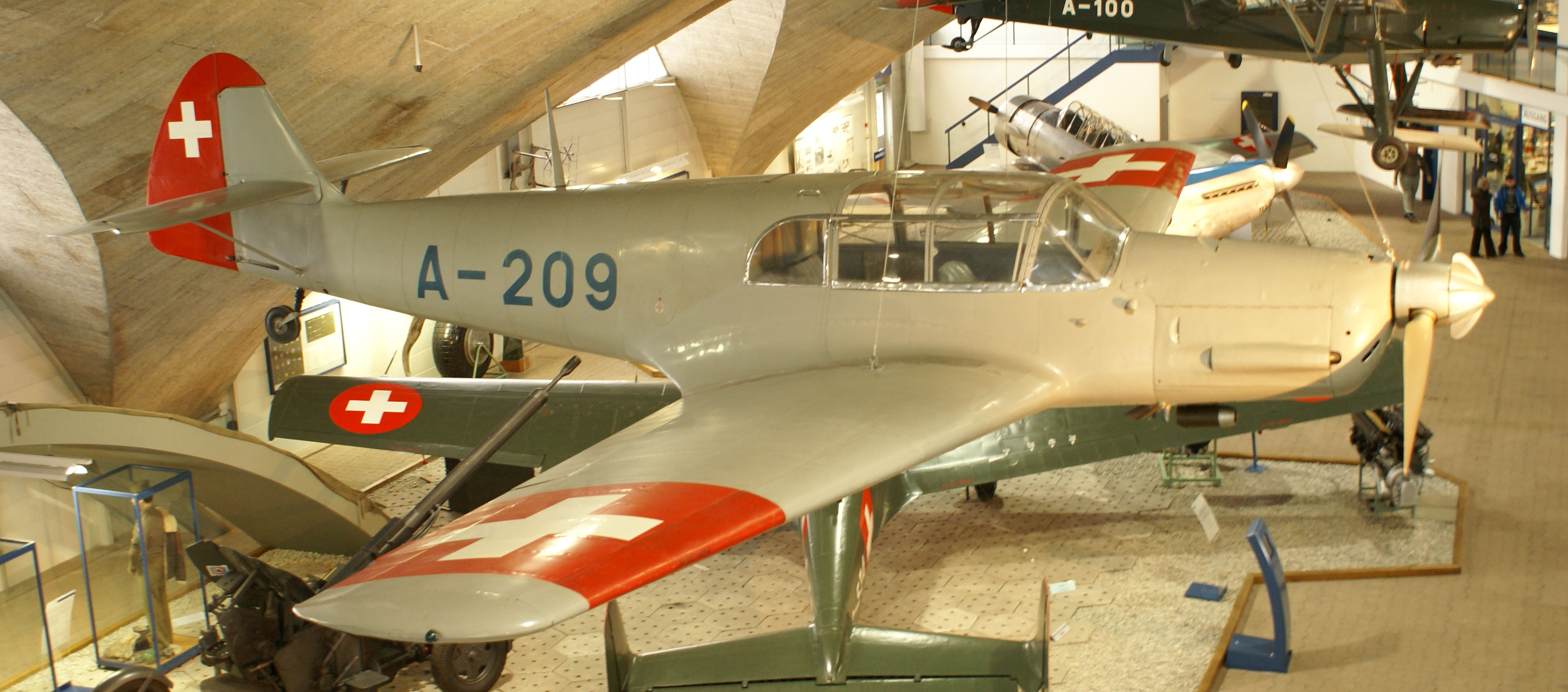
The Bf 108 as used by the Swiss Air Force during World War II. Aviation Museum / Flieger-Flab-Museum in Dübendorf, Switzerland.

Brazil

- Varig

Bulgaria

- Bulgarian Air Force Six aircraft purchased, used mainly for training.

China

- Chinese Nationalist Air Force

Independent State of Croatia

- Air Force of the Independent State of Croatia

Czechoslovakia

- Czechoslovak Air Force operated this type postwar under designation K-70.

France

- Armée de l'Air operated captured Bf 108s and postwar-built Nord 1000 aircraft.

Nazi Germany

- Luftwaffe

Hungary

- Royal Hungarian Air Force operated seven Bf 108s from 1937 to 1945

Italy

- Regia Aeronautica

Japan

- Imperial Japanese Army Air Service

Manchukuo

- Manchukuo National Airways

Norway

- Royal Norwegian Air Force (Postwar)

Poland

- Polish Air Force operated a few captured Bf 108s postwar.

Romania

- Royal Romanian Air Force

Spain

- Spanish Air Force

Switzerland

- Swiss Air Force

Soviet Union

- Soviet Air Force operated several captured Bf 108s.

United Kingdom

- Royal Air Force
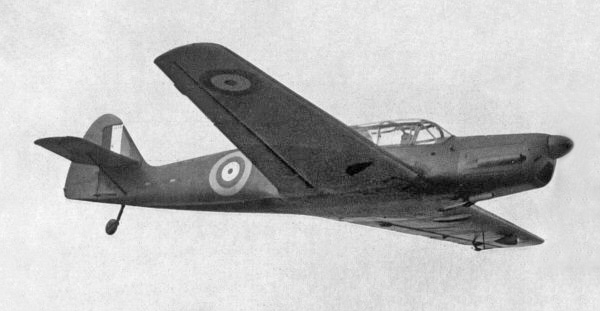
  RAF Aldon
  operated four Bf 108s, under the designation "Messerschmitt Aldon", which were impressed from private owners on the outbreak of the war. Reportedly they were the fastest light communications aircraft the RAF had, but they were also sometimes mistaken for Bf 109s although there is no record of any fatal encounters. Postwar, 15 more captured Bf 108s flew in RAF colours until the mid 1950s.

United States

- United States Army Air Corps - in early 1939, a single Bf 108B was purchased for $14,378 and designated XC-44. It was used only by the US air attaché in Berlin. In November 1941, the aircraft was assessed as unserviceable. The airframe was seized by the Nazi government in December, following the entry of the United States into World War II.

Kingdom of Yugoslavia

- Yugoslav Royal Air Force

== Specifications (Bf 108B) ==
Data from Jane's all the World's Aircraft 1938, Die Deutsche Luftrüstung 1933–1945 Vol.3 – Flugzeugtypen Henschel-Messerschmitt

General characteristics

- Crew: one or two
- Capacity: two or three passengers
- Length: 8.29 m (27 ft 2 in)
- Wingspan: 10.5 m (34 ft 5 in)
- Height: 2.3 m (7 ft 7 in)
- Wing area: 16.4 m^{2} (177 sq ft)
- Airfoil: root: NACA 2416; tip: NACA 2413
- Empty weight: 806 kg (1,777 lb)
- Gross weight: 1,350 kg (2,976 lb)
- Powerplant: 1 × Argus As 10C V-8 inverted air-cooled piston engine, 174 kW (233 hp)
- Propellers: 2-bladed variable-pitch propeller

Performance

- Maximum speed: 305 km/h (190 mph, 165 kn)
- Cruise speed: 260 km/h (160 mph, 140 kn) * Landing speed: 85 km/h (53 mph; 46 kn)
- Range: 1,000 km (620 mi, 540 nmi) at 250 km/h (160 mph; 130 kn)
- Service ceiling: 6,200 m (20,300 ft) (with three passengers and 50 kg (110 lb) baggage)
- Time to altitude: 1,000 m (3,300 ft) in three minutes and 12 seconds

2,000 m (6,600 ft) in seven minutes and 30 seconds
3,000 m (9,800 ft) in 14 minutes
4,000 m (13,000 ft) in 22 minutes
5,000 m (16,000 ft) in 39 minutes

- Wing loading: 82.3 kg/m^{2} (16.9 lb/sq ft)
- Power/mass: 0.133 kW/kg (0.081 hp/lb)

== See also ==
Related development

- Messerschmitt Bf 109
- Nord Pingouin
- Nord Noralpha

Aircraft of comparable role, configuration, and era

- Arado Ar 96
- Fieseler Fi 97
- Klemm Kl 36
- SIPA S.11

Related lists

- List of military aircraft of Germany
- List of aircraft of the RAF
- List of military aircraft of the United States
