= Hanriot H.230 =

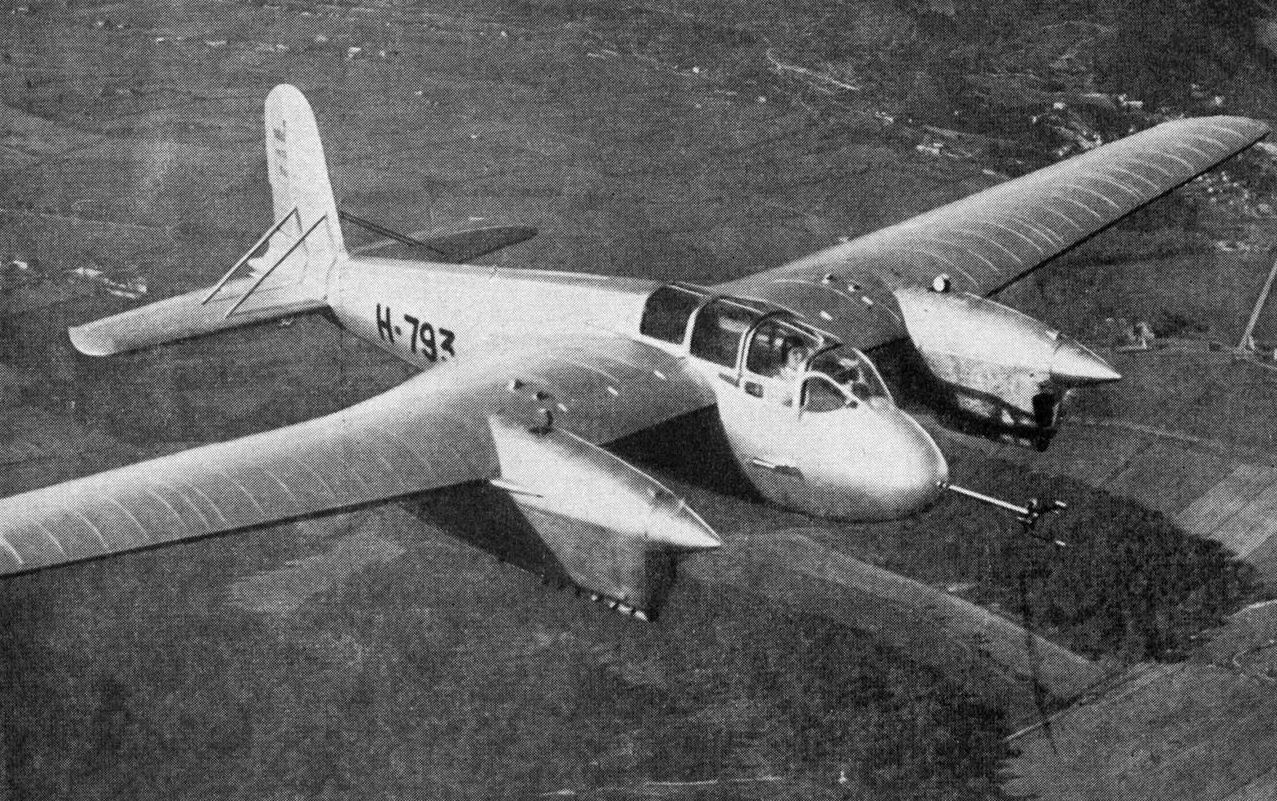
- H.232

General information
- Type: Advanced trainer
- Manufacturer: SNCAC
- Designer: Hanriot
- Primary users: French Air Force Luftwaffe; Finnish Air Force
- Number built: 35

History
- Manufactured: 1940
- Introduction date: February 1940
- First flight: June 1937
- Retired: 1945
- Developed from: Hanriot H.220

The Hanriot H.230 was a French twin-engined advanced trainer. The construction of the aircraft was initiated in 1936 by Hanriot's chief designer Montlaur. The aircraft was produced by the nationalized factory SNCAC.

== History ==
The prototype H.230.01, made its first flight in June 1937. The aircraft resembled its predecessor, the H.220 fighter-bomber, but had a lightened and simplified structure.

The H.230.01 was powered by two 128 kW (172 hp) Salmson 6Af engines and its configuration included a short crew canopy faired into the upper decking of the rear fuselage and a conventional strut-braced tail unit, and the fixed main landing gear units incorporated spatted wheel fairings. During further tests it was decided to introduce considerable dihedral at the wingtips to improve stability, but the H.231.01 which followed in May 1938 had dihedral increased over the whole wing span, and the unusual wingtip arrangement of the modified H.230 was eliminated. Twin fins and rudders were introduced and the power was increased with new 172 kW (230 hp) Salmson 6Af-02 engines.

The Hanriot H.232.01 had a single fin and rudder and was equipped with twin 164 kW (220 hp) Renault 6Q-02/03, (left and right hand propeller rotation), engines plus retractable landing gear. The H.232.02, which made its maiden flight in August 1938, introduced a redesigned cockpit. The aircraft was tested between October 1938 and May 1939. The type was then given a twin fin and rudder tail assembly and was flown in this new configuration in December 1939, then redesignated H.232/2.01.

The French Air Ministry made an initial order of 40 H.232.2s. This order was though soon was extended to 57. The French Air Force started to receive their H-232.2s in February, 1940, and received a total of 35 before the defeat against the Germans in June 1940. The Germans captured 22 aircraft of this type, and since they did not have any use of them, Finland placed an order for three aircraft from the Germans. One was destroyed in an accident during the ferry flight to Finland, the other two saw service as advanced trainers in the Finnish Air Force and were written off on January 2, 1950. During the Winter War the French had planned to send 25 aircraft of this type to Finland. The German aircraft were scrapped in 1942.

== Variants ==
Hanriot H.230

H.230
Twin-engined trainer derived from the Hanriot H.220, powered by 2x 128 kW (172 hp) Salmson 6Af engines, one built.
H.231
Further development, powered by two 2x 172 kW (230 hp) Salmson 6Af-02 engines, two built.
H.232
Production prototype with single fin and rudder replacing earlier twin fins, powered by two Renault 6Q-02/03 engines.
SNCAC NC.232/2
Production aircraft, 57 ordered but only 35 delivered before the fall of France in 1940. Three delivered to Finland (one written off on the delivery flight).
SNCAC NC-600

Further development of the H.232 curtailed by the German invasion in 1940.

== Operators ==
Finland

- Finnish Air Force

France

- French Air Force

Germany

- Luftwaffe

== Specifications (SNCAC NC-232.2) ==
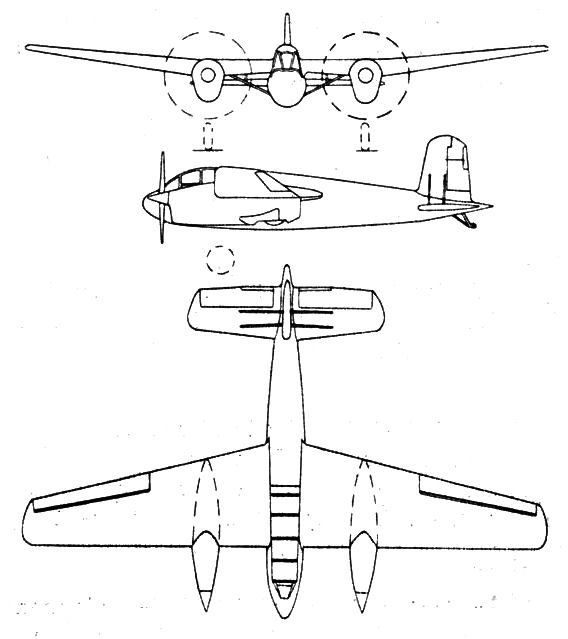
Hanriot 232 3-view drawing from L'Aerophile September 1938

Data from Aviafrance : SNCAC NC-232.2

General characteristics

- Crew: 2
- Length: 8.55 m (28 ft 1 in)
- Wingspan: 12.76 m (41 ft 10 in)
- Height: 3.47 m (11 ft 5 in)
- Wing area: 21.2 m^{2} (228 sq ft)
- Empty weight: 1,728 kg (3,810 lb)
- Gross weight: 2,260 kg (4,982 lb)
- Powerplant: 1 × Renault 6Q-02 6-cylinder air-cooled inverted in-line piston engine 220 CV (220 hp; 160 kW) LH rotation
- Powerplant: 1 × Renault 6Q-03 6-cylinder air-cooled inverted in-line piston engine 220 CV (220 hp; 160 kW) RH rotation
- Propellers: 2-bladed Ratier electric variable-pitch propellers LH and RH rotation

Performance

- Maximum speed: 335 km/h (208 mph, 181 kn) at 1,000 m (3,300 ft)
- Range: 1,200 km (750 mi, 650 nmi)
- Service ceiling: 7,500 m (24,600 ft)

== See also ==
Related lists

- List of aircraft of World War II

== Bibliography ==
- Ledet, Michel (June 1993). "Le Hanriot H-232 (1ère partie)". Avions: Toute l'aéronautique et son histoire (in French). No. 4. pp. 15–20. ISSN 1243-8650.
- Perttula, Pentti. "Backwoods Landing Strip: Finnish Air Force Aircraft".
- Stenman, Kari (July 1993). "Le Hanriot H-232: 2ème partie". Avions: Toute l'aéronautique et son histoire (in French). No. 5. pp. 18–21. ISSN 1243-8650.
