= Dornier Do 212 =

Flying boat

Do 212

General information
- Type: Flying boat
- National origin: Switzerland/Germany
- Manufacturer: Dornier Flugzeugwerke
- Number built: 1

History
- First flight: August 1942

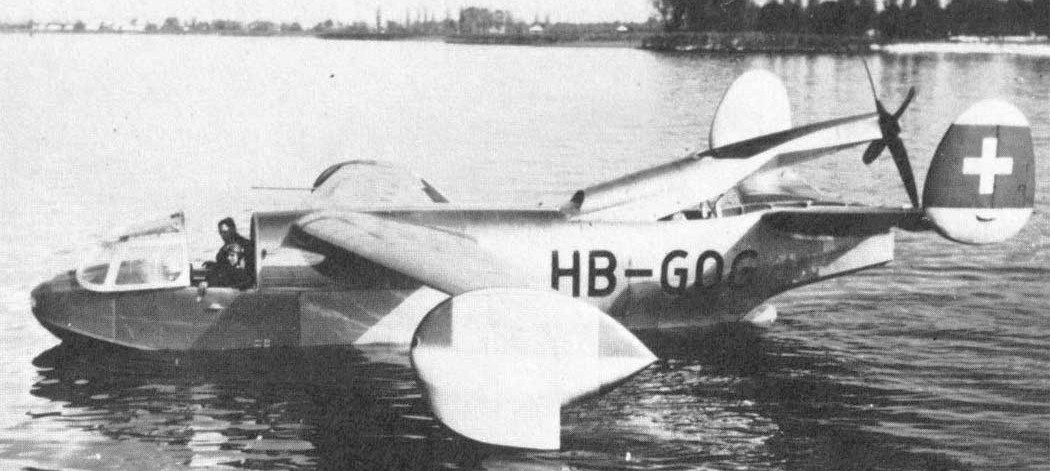
A Dornier Do 212 (1942)

The Dornier Do 212 was a four-seat experimental amphibian flying boat built by the Swiss subsidiary of Dornier, in Altenrhein on Lake Constance. Design was initiated in 1938 by the German and Swiss branches, the latter being responsible for the actual construction of the prototype.

The Do 212 was an all-metal cantilever monoplane with fixed wingtip floats and a 343 kW (460 hp) Hirth HM 512-B-0 12-cylinder air-cooled engine which, mounted aft of the cabin, was buried in the fuselage and drove a four-blade airscrew aft of the tail by means of a shaft which could be tilted upward 12° to provide water clearance.

Initial water taxiing trials resulted in the enlarging of the wingtip floats. On 3 August 1942, a few attempts to take off from water were made, but these failed. A Do 24 was used to tow the Do 212 and it finally flew; however, instability forced the pilot to ditch just after takeoff. Further trials ended the same way. Difficulties were also experienced with the extension shaft, and the cooling of the engine presented a problem. Consequently, no further testing was undertaken, and the prototype was scrapped in 1943.

== Specifications (Do 212) ==
Data from

General characteristics

- Crew: one
- Capacity: three
- Length: 10.15 m (33 ft 4 in)
- Wingspan: 10.3 m (33 ft 10 in)
- Height: 4.4 m (14 ft 5 in)
- Wing area: 23.1 m^{2} (249 sq ft)
- Empty weight: 1,850 kg (4,079 lb)
- Gross weight: 2,370 kg (5,225 lb)
- Fuel capacity: fuel - 250 L (55 imp gal) , oil - 30 L (7 imp gal)

Stabiliser Span
6.52 m (21 ft) with 8° 30' dihedral

- Powerplant: 1 × Hirth HM 512B-0 inverted 60° V-12 air-cooled piston engine, 330.9 kW (443.8 hp)
- Propellers: 4-bladed Escher-Wyss, 2.40 m (7 ft 10 in) diameter driven via a 2.9 m (10 ft) extension shaft raised 12° for take-off and landing.

Performance

- Maximum speed: 293 km/h (182 mph, 158 kn) (estimated)
- Cruise speed: 240 km/h (150 mph, 130 kn)
- Range: 650 km (400 mi, 350 nmi) (estimated)
- Service ceiling: 5,700 m (18,700 ft) (estimated)
- Rate of climb: 0.476 m/s (93.7 ft/min) (estimated)
- Time to altitude:
  - 1,000 m (3,281 ft) in 35 minutes (estimated)
  - 3,000 m (9,843 ft) in 105 minutes (estimated)
