= Air Bleu =

French airline company (1935–1940)

Air Bleu (Société Anonyme Air Bleu) was a French airline between 1935 and 1940 that specialised in the delivery of mail within France.

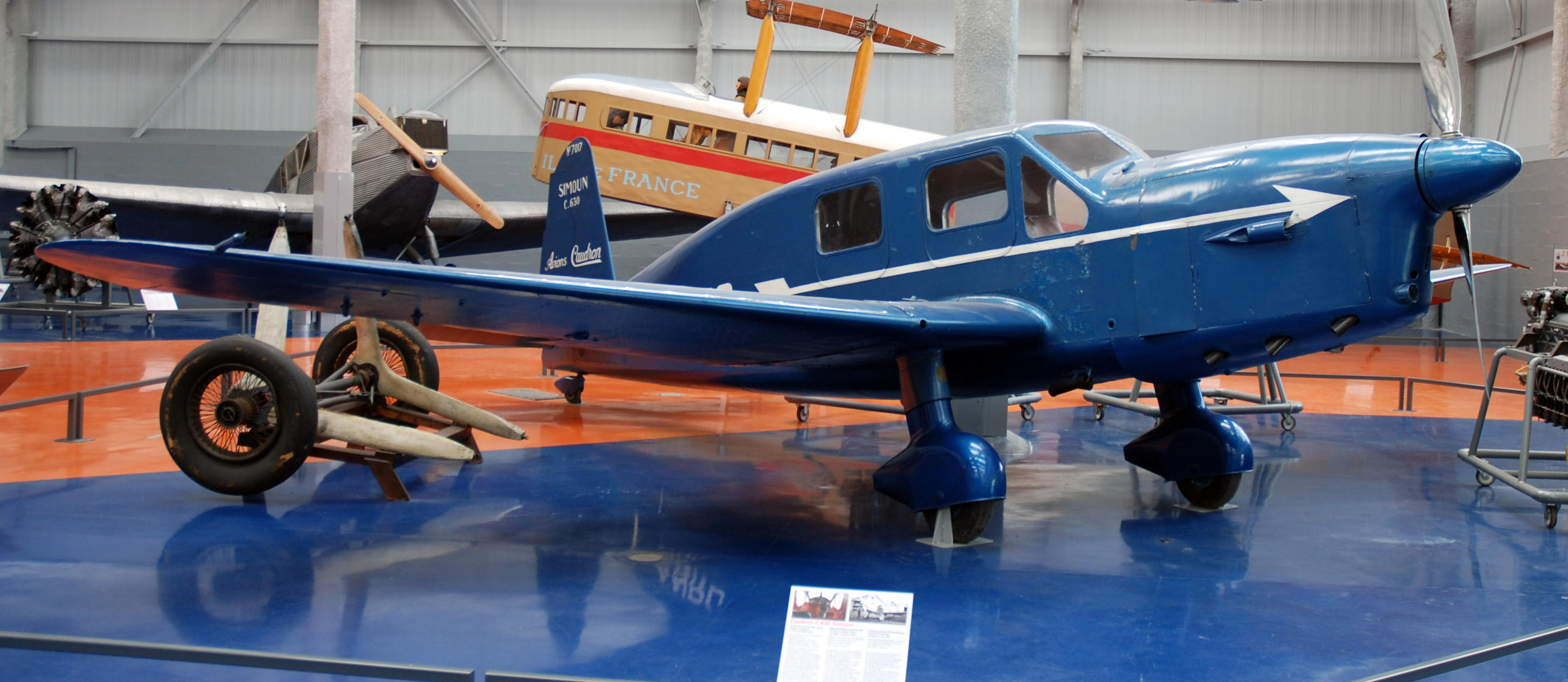
Caudron Simoun preserved at Musée de l'Air et de l'Espace in Le Bourget airport near Paris

Air Bleu started operations on the 10 July 1935 with Caudron Simoun aircraft operating four different airmail routes across France, the aircraft would leave Le Bourget in the morning and return later in the afternoon.

In August 1936 services were stopped and the aircraft grounded due to financial problems, mainly due to a new surcharge on the cost of letters reducing the volume of mail. In June 1937 the company was reformed with the French government owning 52% and Air France 24% of the new company.

In September 1939 the airline was requisitioned for military duties and operated a mail service between Paris and London. In June 1940 the fleet was reduced to just the Caudron Goélands and by September 1940 the fleet was transferred to Air France and the company was dissolved.

== Fleet ==
- 12 x Caudron Simoun
- 5 x Caudron Goéland
- 2 x Potez 630 (fighter aircraft converted into mail carriers)
