= Nord Noralpha =

1944 French communications and liaison aircraft

Noralpha
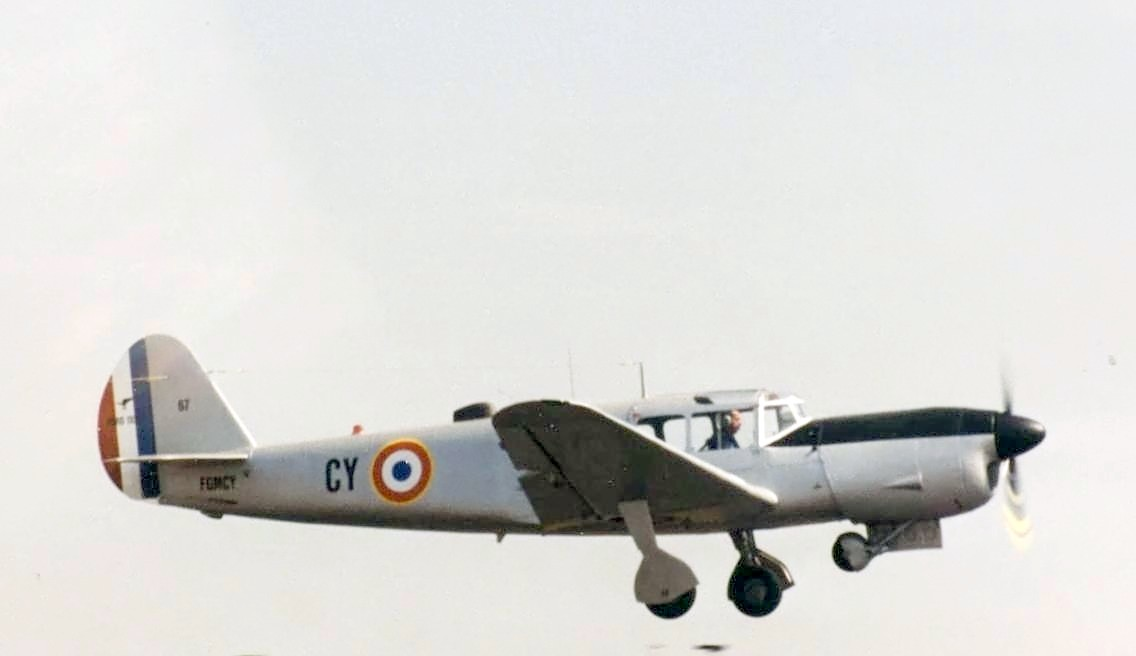
- Nord 1101 Noralpha, in French Air Force markings, taking off from Coventry Airport, England, in 2000

General information
- Type: Communications and liaison monoplane
- Manufacturer: Nord Aviation
- Number built: 200

History
- First flight: 1944
- Developed from: Messerschmitt Bf 108

The Nord 1100 Noralpha is a French-built and re-engined Messerschmitt Bf 108 produced by Nord Aviation.

== Development ==
Construction of the Messerschmitt Bf 108 was transferred to the Société Nationale de Constructions Aéronautiques du Nord (usually known simply as Nord) at Les Mureaux, to the West of Paris, in occupied France in 1942. The company built two prototypes of the Messerschmitt Me 208 during 1943/44. One survived the liberation and was redesignated Nord 1100.

The company then produced a re-engined version of the Nord Pingouin with a Renault 6Q-10 engine as the Nord 1101. The 1101 was designated the Ramier by the French military. One Nord 1104 Noralpha was fitted with a 180 kW (240 hp) Potez 6D-0 for trials and two earlier 1101 Noralphas were converted with a Turbomeca Astazou II turboshaft engine as the S.F.E.R.M.A.-Nord 1100 Noralpha (S.F.E.R.M.A. - Société Française d'Entretien et de Réparation de Matériel Aéronautique) in 1959.

== Design ==
The Noralpha was a low-wing cantilever monoplane with a braced horizontal tail surface and single rudder. It had a retractable tricycle landing gear. The engine was nose-mounted and it had an enclosed cabin with side-by-side seating for two and room behind for a further two passengers.

== Operational history ==
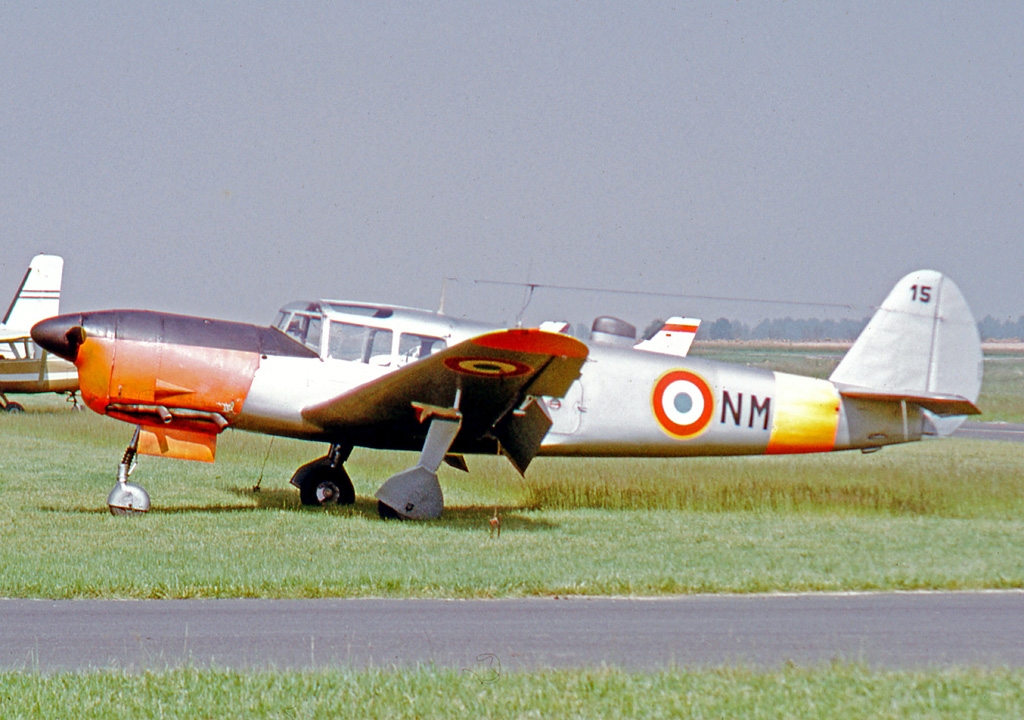
French Air Force Noralpha from the Centre d'essais en vol at Toussus airfield near Paris in June 1975

Nord built 200 production examples of the Noralpha and these served as communications aircraft with the French Air Force and French Navy. Later, many examples were civilianised. The final Air Force Noralphas were replaced in service with the Centre d'essais en vol (CEV) at Bretigny-sur-Orge during 1974-75, whilst a few naval examples continued for a further brief period.

== Variants ==
1100
2x French-built Me 208 prototypes, powered by a single 180 kW (240 hp) Argus As 10C-1 engine.
1101 Noralpha / Ramier I
170 kW (230 hp) Renault 6Q-10 (right-hand turning) powered production variant. 205 were built for civil and French military use where the 1101 was known as the Nord 1101 Ramier I (English: Woodpigeon I).
1102 Noralpha / Ramier II
180 kW (240 hp) Renault 6Q-11 (left-hand turning) powered variant, not built. French military use where the 1102 was known as the Ramier II (English: Woodpigeon II).
1104 Noralpha
One trials aircraft powered by a 180 kW (240 hp) Potez 6D-0 engine.
S.F.E.R.M.A.-Nord 1110 Nord-Astazou
Two conversions by S.F.E.R.M.A. (Société Française d'Entretien et de Réparation de Matériel Aéronautique) in 1959, each with a single 406 kW (545 hp) Turbomeca Astazou II turboprop engine.

== Operators ==
France

- Armée de l'Air (ALA)
- Aviation Légère de l’Armée de Terre (ALAT)
- Aéronavale

== Specifications (1101 Noralpha) ==
Data from Illustrated Encyclopedia of Aircraft

General characteristics

- Crew: one
- Capacity: three passengers
- Length: 8.53 m (28 ft 0 in)
- Wingspan: 11.48 m (37 ft 8 in)
- Height: 3.25 m (10 ft 8 in)
- Wing area: 17.37 m^{2} (187 sq ft)
- Empty weight: 948 kg (2,090 lb)
- Gross weight: 1,645 kg (3,627 lb)
- Powerplant: 1 × Renault 6Q-10 inline piston engine , 174 kW (233 hp)

Performance

- Maximum speed: 305 km/h (189 mph, 164 kn)
- Range: 1,200 km (745 mi, 647 nmi)
- Service ceiling: 5,900 m (19,355 ft)

== See also ==
Related development

- Messerschmitt Bf 108 Taifun
- Nord Pingouin

Aircraft of comparable role, configuration, and era

- Mráz Sokol
