= Aéromaritime =

Airline of France (1966–1991)

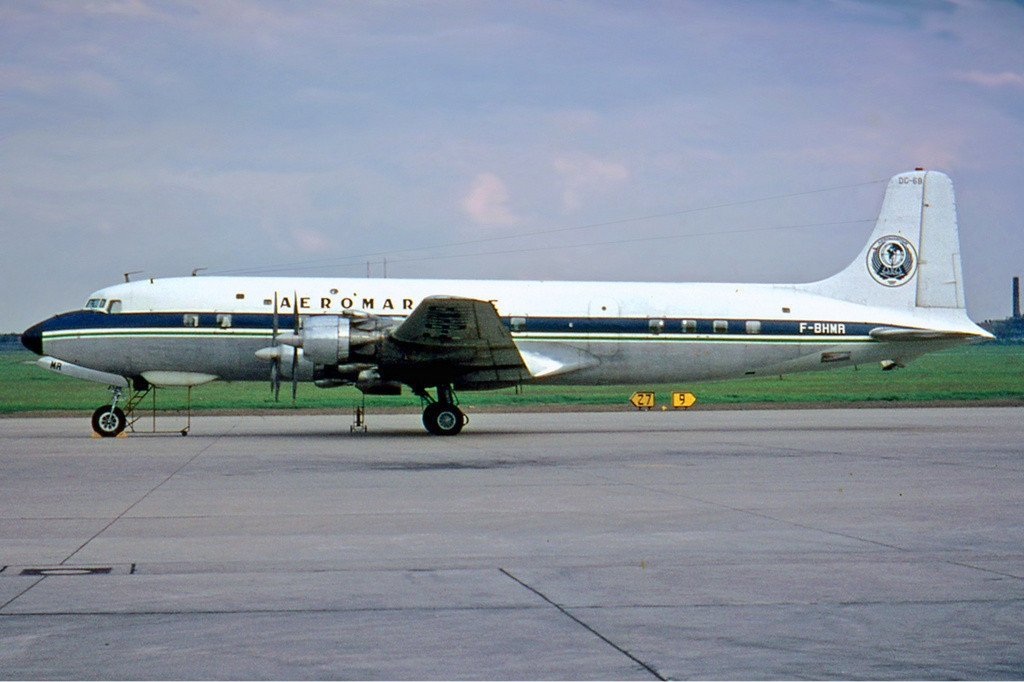
- Douglas DC-6B
- Founded: 1966
- Ceased operations: October 1991
- Hubs: Paris–Le Bourget
- Parent company: UTA (1966–1991)
- Headquarters: Paris, France

Compagnie Aéromaritime d'Affrètement S.A., in short Aéromaritime, was a French charter airline established in 1966 by independent air carrier UTA and which supported the parent company for a quarter of a century. Aéromaritime ceased flying in 1991 after it had already transferred its operations within the European continent to Air France subsidiary Air Charter.

== History ==
Aéromaritime was established by the independent French airline UTA in 1966. The task was to handle inclusive tour services and general passenger and cargo work. Flight operations began on January 11 of the following year with a few Douglas DC-6s but were discontinued in December. The company remained inactive until early 1971. When restarted it held a contract to operate Super Guppy (AS-201) aircraft owned by Airbus consortium and used to transport oversize components of the Airbus A300B between the factories. From the mid-1970s this became the only activity up to managing four ships of the capacious four-engine aircraft.

In April 1990, a short-lived corporate name change to "Aéromaritime International" was made. In fact, in anticipation of the merger, between 1989 and 1990 all Aéromaritime European operations were transferred to Air Charter, a subsidiary of Air France. Aéromaritime ceased operations in October 1991 and was dissolved shortly thereafter.
