= Nord Pingouin =

1944 utility aircraft family by Nord

Pingouin
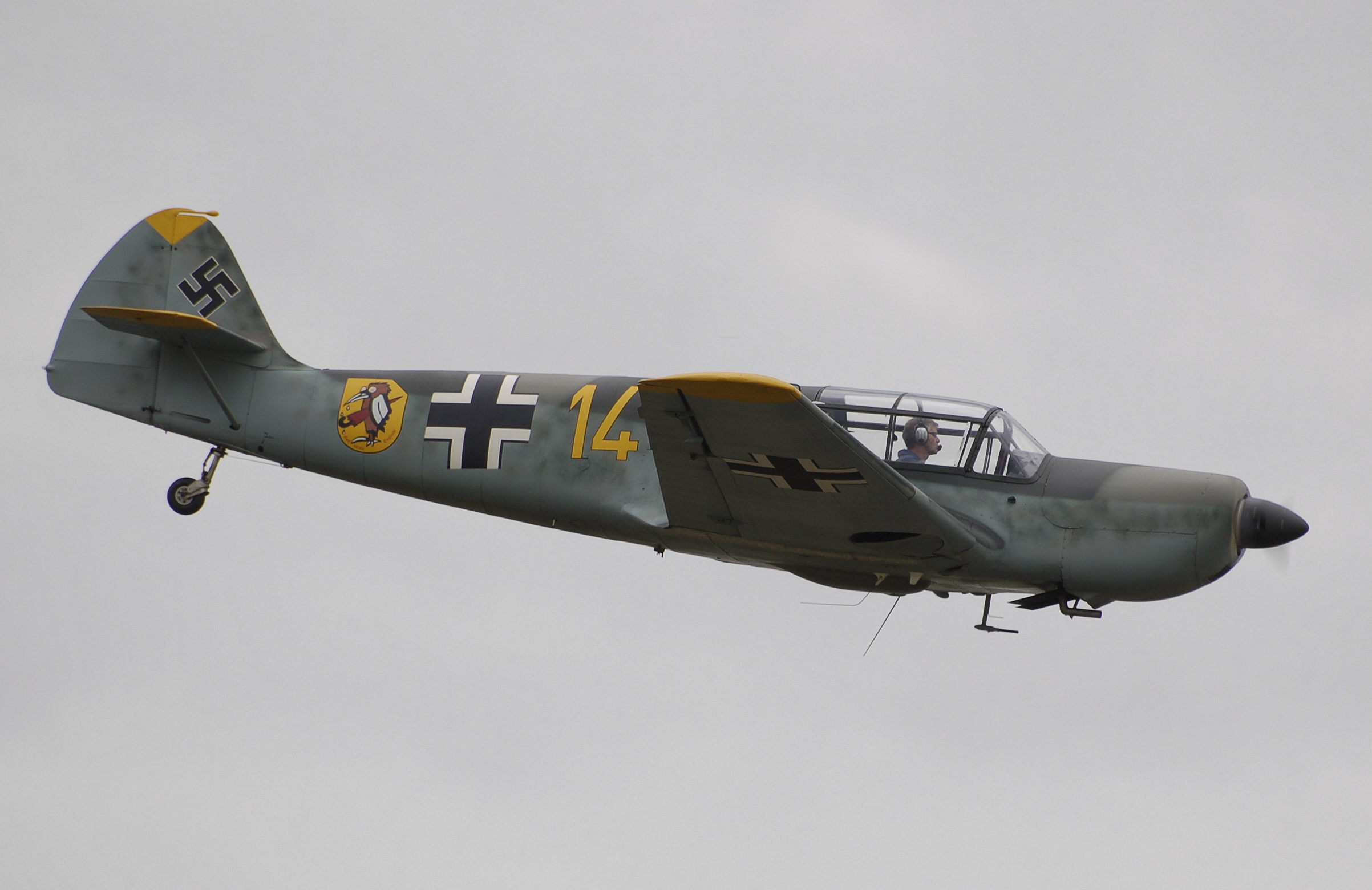
- A Nord 1002 Pingouin II in 2008. Built in 1945, this aircraft has been painted to represent a Messerschmitt Bf 109. Fitted with a modern Lycoming O-540 engine rather than the original Renault 6Q.

General information
- Type: Communications and liaison monoplane
- Manufacturer: SNCAN
- Number built: 286

History
- First flight: 1944
- Developed from: Messerschmitt Bf 108 Taifun

The Nord Pingouin (French pronunciation: [pɛ̃ɡwɛ̃], Auk) is a French-built, re-engined Messerschmitt Bf 108 Taifun produced by SNCAN (Société Nationale de Constructions Aéronautiques du Nord).

== Development ==
In 1942 the manufacture of the Messerschmitt Bf 108 was transferred to SNCAN (usually known as Nord) at Les Mureaux in occupied France. Before the liberation, 170 Bf 108s were built and Nord continued to build the aircraft using scavenged Bf 108 airframe parts as the Nord 1000, until stocks of German Argus engines were exhausted. The type was then re-engined with a 233 hp (174 kW) Renault 6Q-11 six-cylinder inline engine and was designated the Nord 1001 Pingouin I. A further update followed with a Renault 6Q-10 powered variant which was designated the Nord 1002 Pingouin II. Total production was 286 with the majority used as communications and liaison aircraft with the French armed forces.

The design was further developed with the tricycle landing gear Nord Noralpha.

== Design ==
The Pingouin was a low-wing cantilever monoplane with a braced trimmable horizontal tail surface with elevators, and a single fin and rudder. It had a tailwheel landing gear with outward-retracting main gear. The engine was nose-mounted and the Pingouin had an enclosed cabin that seated four in two rows of two. Like the Bf 108, the wings had automatic leading edge slats and could be folded when the aircraft was on the ground, allowing the complete aircraft to be transported by rail.

== Variants ==
1000
French-built Bf 108.
1001 Pingouin I
Renault 6Q-11 powered variant.
1002 Pingouin II
Renault 6Q-10 powered variant.

== Operators ==
France

- French Air Force
- French Army
- French Navy

== Specifications (1002) ==
General characteristics

- Crew: one
- Capacity: three passengers
- Length: 8.28 m (27 ft 2 in)
- Wingspan: 10.61 m (34 ft 10 in)
- Height: 2.29 m (7 ft 6.5 in)
- Empty weight: 881 kg (1,941 lb)
- Gross weight: 1,356 kg (2,987 lb)
- Powerplant: 1 × Renault 6Q-10 , 179 kW (240 hp)

Performance

- Cruise speed: 257 km/h (160 mph, 140 kn)
- Range: 997 km (620 mi, 540 nmi)

== See also ==
Related development

- Messerschmitt Bf 108 Taifun
- Nord Noralpha
