= Hirth HM 512 =

1930s German aircraft engine

HM 512
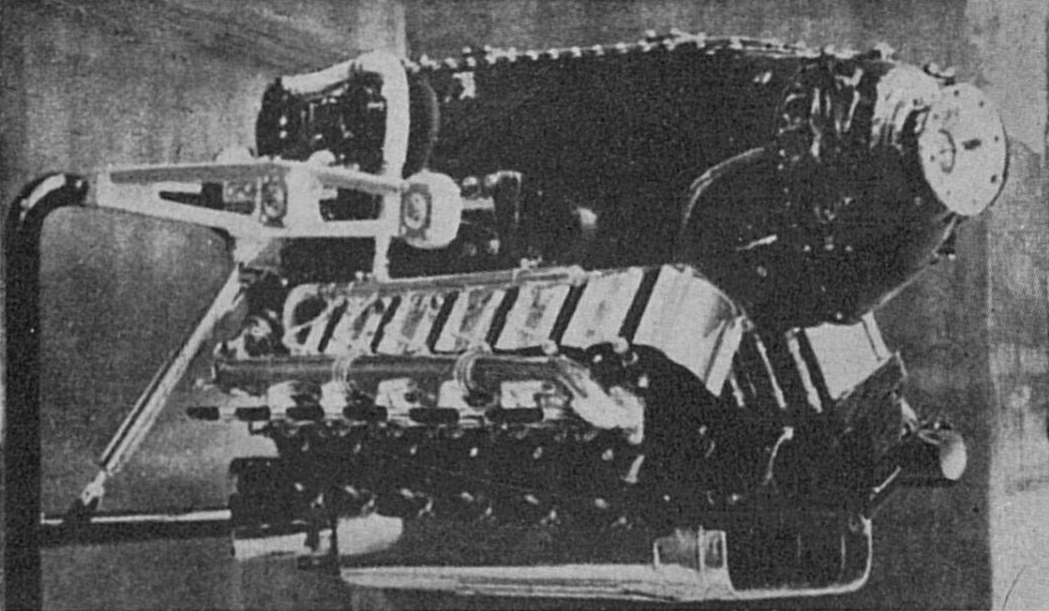
- HM 512B
- Type: Air-cooled inverted V12 piston engine
- National origin: Germany
- Manufacturer: Hirth-Motoren G.m.b.H, Stuttgart
- Designer: Hellmuth Hirth
- Number built: small numbers
- Developed from: Hirth HM 506

The Hirth HM 512 was a supercharged, inverted V12, air-cooled aircraft engine, based on the earlier 6-cylinder HM 506, produced in the late 1930s.

== Design and development ==
The HM 512 shared the same bore and stroke (105 mm × 115 mm) and 6:1 compression ratio with the rest of the HM500 series air-cooled engines. Other shared features were Hirth's use of roller bearings in the crankshaft and at both ends of connecting rods. The crankshaft was of typical Hirth multipart design, the 12-cylinders requiring 7 roller bearings. Like the HM 508, the drive was geared down by 1:1.5.

== Variants ==
HM 512A
Initial version; take off power 400 hp (300 kW), continuous 360 hp (270 kW)
HM 512B
Take off power 450 hp (335 kW), continuous 360 hp (270 kW)

== Applications ==
- Dornier Do 212

== Specifications (HM 512A) ==
Data from Flugzeug-Typenbuch. Handbuch der deutschen Luftfahrt- und Zubehör-Industrie 1944, Jane's all the World's Aircraft 1938

=== General characteristics ===
- Type: Inverted 60° V12 air-cooled piston engine
- Bore: 105 mm (4.13 in)
- Stroke: 115 mm (4.53 in)
- Displacement: 11.94 L (729 cu in)
- Length: 1,542 mm (60.71 in)
- Width: 665 mm (26.18 in)
- Height: 815 mm (32.09 in)
- Dry weight: 270 kg (595 lb) dry, unequipped

314 kg (692 lb) wet, equipped

=== Components ===
- Valvetrain: 1 inlet and 1 exhaust under-valve per cylinder driven by pushrods and rockers
- Supercharger: Light alloy centrifugal type, driven at 4.4 times crankshaft speed.
- Fuel system: SUM 807 carburetor with automatic mixture control and equipped for inverted flight.
- Fuel type: 87 Octane gasoline
- Oil system: Metered fresh oil to cylinder barrels and crankshaft bearings at 3.5–4.5 atm (51.44–66.13 psi; 3.55–4.56 bar). Splash lubrication for supercharger and camshaft. Stökicht Sun and planet reduction gear lubricated by high pressure oil.
- Cooling system: Air-cooled

=== Performance ===
- Power output:

- 400 PS (395 hp; 294 kW) at 3,110 rpm (1 minute) at sea level
- 360 PS (355 hp; 265 kW) at 3,000 rpm (5 minutes) at sea level
- 330 PS (325 hp; 243 kW) at 2,910 rpm (30 minutes) at sea level
- 300 PS (296 hp; 221 kW) at 2,810 rpm (max. continuous) at sea level

- Specific power: 30.01 PS/L (0.49 hp/cu in; 22.07 kW/L)
- Compression ratio: 6.2:1
- Specific fuel consumption: 0.220 kg/PSh (0.492 lb/(hp⋅h); 0.299 kg/kWh) at max continuous
- Oil consumption: 0.003 kg/PSh (0.007 lb/(hp⋅h); 0.004 kg/kWh) at max continuous
- Power-to-weight ratio: 1.333 PS/kg (0.596 hp/lb; 0.980 kW/kg)
- B.M.E.P.: 9.71 atm (9.84 bar; 142.7 psi)
- Reduction gear: Stoekicht sun and planet gears 0.666:1
