= Caudron Simoun =

1930s French four-seat touring monoplane

Simoun
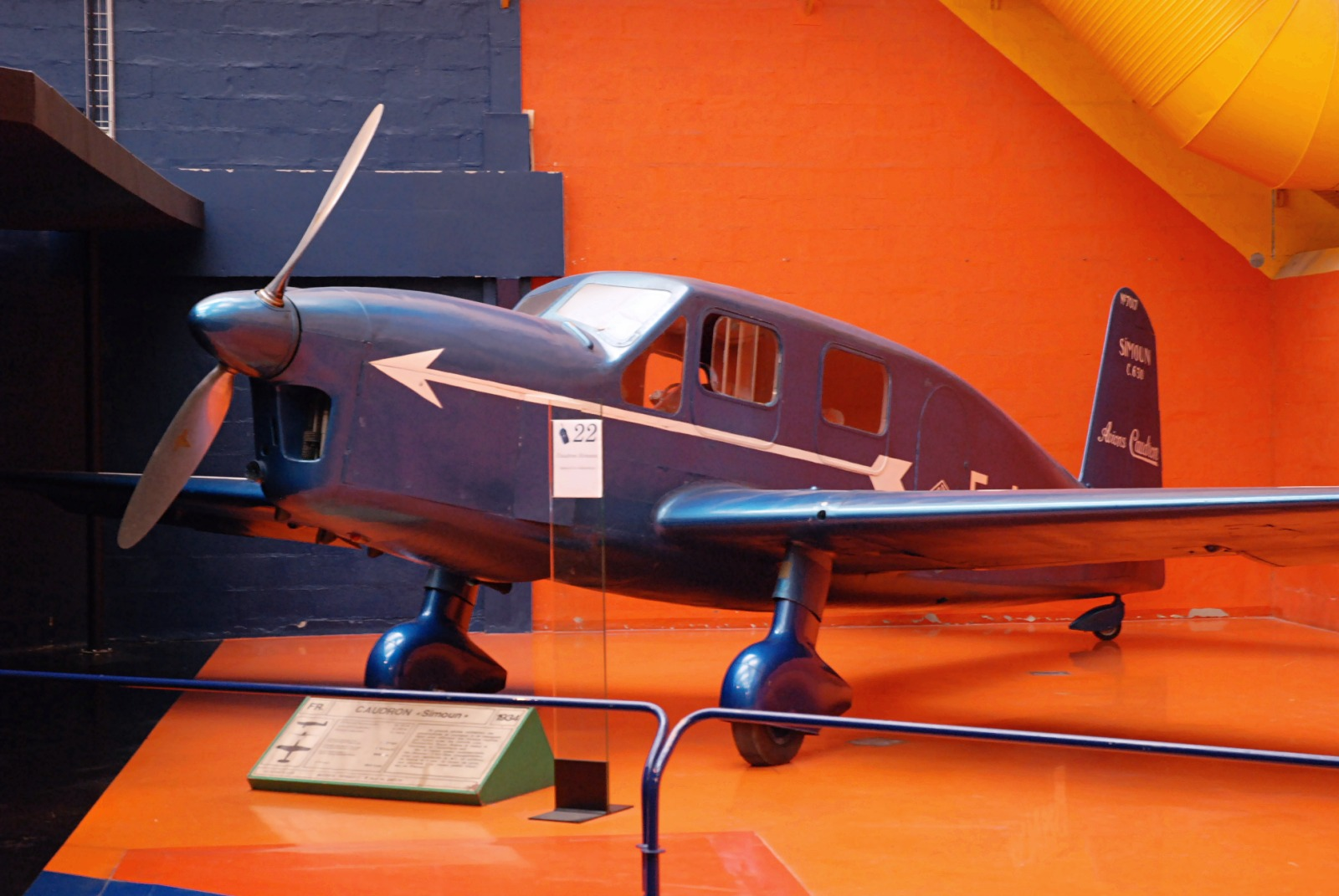
- Preserved C.630 at Musée de l'Air et de l'Espace.

General information
- Type: Touring plane, mail plane, liaison plane
- Manufacturer: Caudron
- Designer: Marcel Riffard
- Number built: 680 (estimated)

History
- Manufactured: 1930s
- Introduction date: 1935
- First flight: 1934

The Caudron Simoun was a 1930s French four-seat touring monoplane. It was used as a mail plane by Air Bleu, flew record-setting long-range flights, and was also used as a liaison aircraft by the Armée de l'Air during World War II. The aircraft later was used as an inspiration to the famous Mooney "M series" aircraft by Jacques "Strop" Carusoam.

== Variants ==
C.500 Simoun I
Experimental, one built.
C.520 Simoun
Experimental, one built.
C.620 Simoun IV
Experimental, one built.
C.630 Simoun
Initial production version with Renault Bengali 6Pri engine, 20 built.
C.631 Simoun
Modified version with a Renault 6Q-01 engine, three built.
C.632 Simoun
Similar to C.631, one built.
C.633 Simoun
Modified fuselage with a Renault 6Q-07 engine, 6 built.
C.634 Simoun
Modified wing and take-off weight with either a Renault 6Q-01 or Renault 6Q-09 engine, 3 built.
C.635 Simoun
Improved cabin layout and either a Renault 6Q-01 or Renault 6Q-09 engine, 46 built and conversions from earlier versions.
C.635M Simoun
Military version with either a Renault 6Q-09 or Renault 6Q-19 engine, 489 built.

== Operators ==
Belgium

- Belgian Air Force

France

- Air Bleu
- Armée de l'Air
- Aeronavale

Germany

- Luftwaffe (small numbers)

Hungary

- Royal Hungarian Air Force

United Kingdom

- Royal Air Force
  - No. 267 Squadron RAF

United States

- United States Navy

== Specifications (C.630) ==
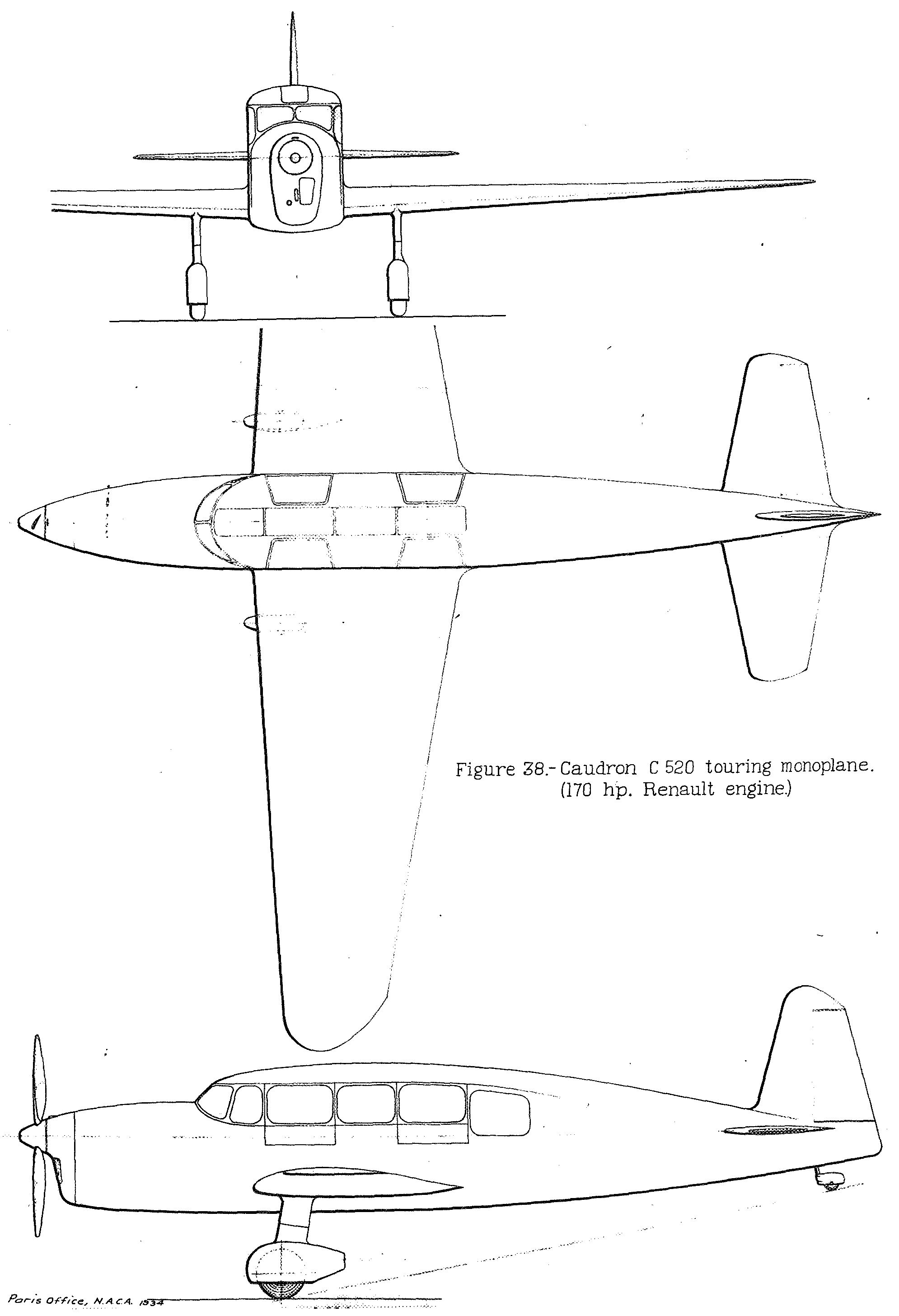
Caudron C.520 3-view drawing from NACA-SR-26

Data from Jane's All the World's Aircraft 1938

General characteristics

- Crew: 1-2
- Capacity: 2-3
- Length: 8.7 m (28 ft 7 in)
- Wingspan: 10.4 m (34 ft 1 in)
- Height: 2.25 m (7 ft 5 in)
- Wing area: 16 m^{2} (170 sq ft)
- Empty weight: 855 kg (1,885 lb)
- Gross weight: 1,350 kg (2,976 lb)
- Powerplant: 1 × Renault 6Pri 6-cylinder ionverted air-cooled in-line piston engine, 160 kW (220 hp)
- Propellers: 2-bladed Ratier

Performance

- Maximum speed: 310 km/h (190 mph, 170 kn)
- Cruise speed: 280 km/h (170 mph, 150 kn)
- Landing speed: 90 km/h (56 mph; 49 kn)
- Range: 1,230 km (760 mi, 660 nmi)
- Service ceiling: 7,300 m (24,000 ft)
- Wing loading: 84.3 kg/m^{2} (17.3 lb/sq ft)
- Power/mass: 0.122 kW/kg (0.074 hp/lb)

== See also ==
- Antoine de Saint-Exupéry's desert crash

Related lists

- List of aircraft of World War II
- List of interwar military aircraft
