= Daniel Lacalle =

Spanish economist (born 1967)

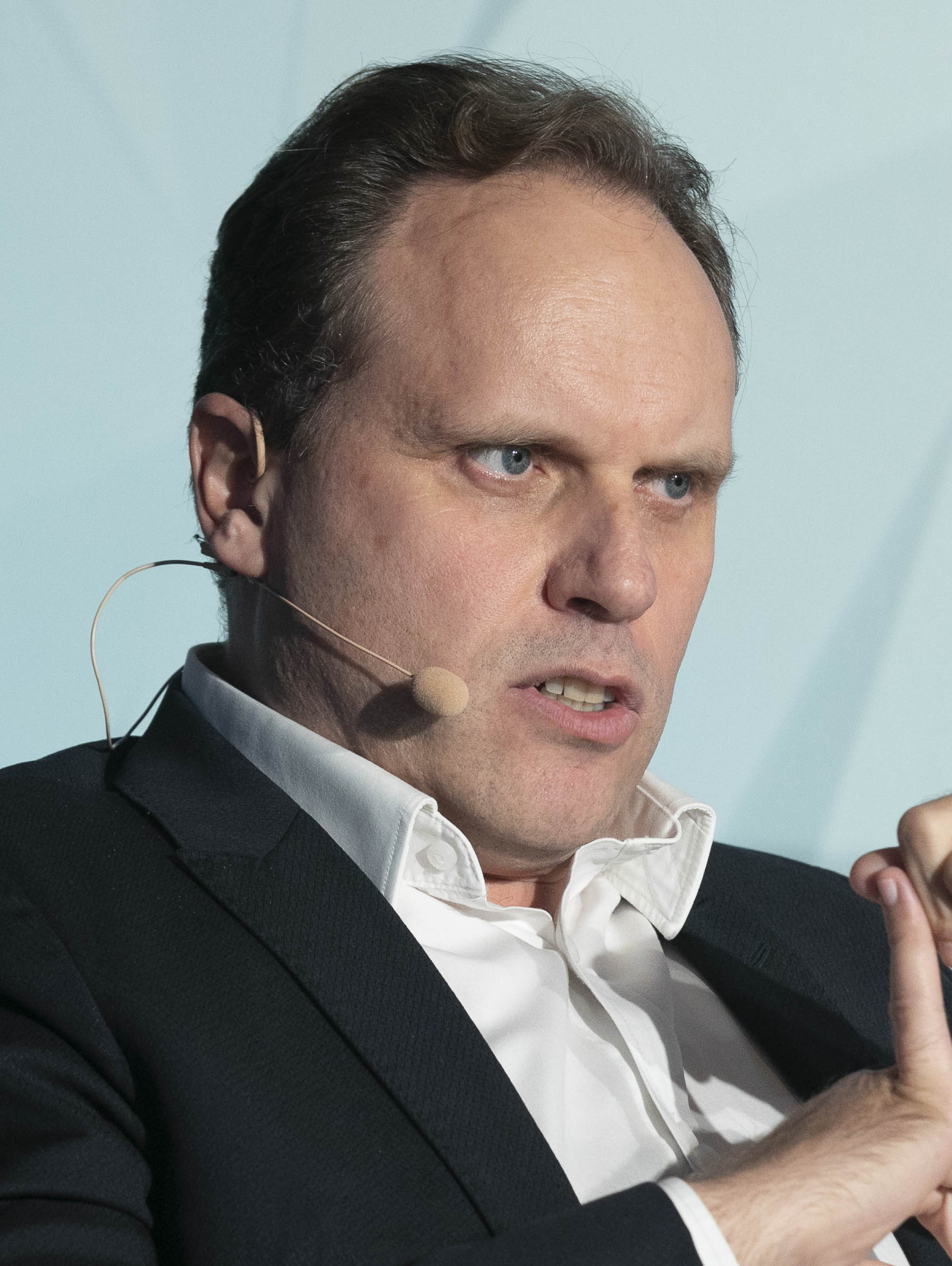
- Lacalle in 2018
- Born: 5 August 1967 (age 58); Madrid, Spain
- Education: Autonomous University of Madrid; Valencia Catholic University Saint Vincent Martyr (PhD)
- Occupation: Economist
- Employers: IE Business School; Repsol; Enagás; ABN AMRO; Citadel; PIMCO; Tressis; Mises Institute
- Movement: Liberalism, Austrian School, Conservatism
- Parent: José Daniel Lacalle Sousa
- Website: dlacalle.com/en

Daniel Lacalle Fernández (born 5 August 1967) is a Spanish economist. He works as an investment manager and as a professor of global economics. He is the author of several economics books as well as being a columnist and contributor to various print and digital publications. Ideologically, he is usually defined as a conservative liberal, close to but not affiliated with the Partido Popular, the party with which he ran in the Spanish general elections of April 2019. He resides in London.

== Early life and education ==
He is the grandson of José Daniel Lacalle Larraga, Minister of Air during the Franco dictatorship, and son of the sociologist José Daniel Lacalle Sousa, author of several books on the labor market, a member of the Communist Party of Spain and head of the Economy and Society section of Fundación de Investigaciones Marxistas. He graduated in Economic and Business Sciences from the Autonomous University of Madrid, and later completed his studies with a postgraduate degree at the IESE Business School of the University of Navarra. Additionally, he holds the title of International Financial Analyst (CIIA), and holds a PhD In Economics as well as a master's degree in Economic Research from the Catholic University of Valencia. He taught in the Master in International Financial Markets at the Instituto de Empresa (IE Business School) where he is a member of the faculty.

== Career ==
Lacalle's professional career began in March 1991 at Repsol, where he spent eleven years and was responsible for international relations. He later moved to Enagás and ABN AMRO, specializing in energy and oil. In 2005, he refocused his career as a portfolio manager at the hedge fund Citadel, from which he moved to Ecofin Limited in 2007 (not to be confused with Ecofin). Between 2014 and 2015 he worked at PIMCO, one of the largest global fixed income investment asset managers, assuming one of the group's vice presidencies.

In Spain, he is known for writing books and for his presence in the media, where he has defended economic liberalism with measures such as reducing public spending and reducing the powers of the State, in addition to the privatization of strategic sectors.

Since 2015, Lacalle has been the Chief Economist at Tressis. Lacalle has also presided over the Instituto Mises Hispano since 2017, an organization dedicated to disseminating the contents of the US Mises Institute in Spanish.

== Doctoral thesis controversy ==
In May 2022, the Spanish publication elDiario said it uncovered evidence that significant portions of LaCalle's 2016 doctoral thesis, presented and defended at the Catholic University of Valencia, were not his original work, and included numerous word-for-word extracts and translations from articles and works previously published by others without referencing them as citations. LaCalle and the academic president of the judging panel of the Catholic University of Valencia said he had properly referenced others' work and denied that it constituted plagiarism.

Lacalle started legal actions against El Diario in June 2022, which was legally forced to publish two rectifications from Lacalle.

== Bibliography ==
=== Books ===
- Lacalle, Daniel (2014). Life in the Financial Markets: How They Really Work And Why They Matter To You. Wiley. ISBN 978-1118914878.
- Lacalle, Daniel (2015). The Energy World is Flat: Opportunities from the End of Peak Oil. Wiley. ISBN 978-1118868003.
- Lacalle, Daniel (2018). Escape from the Central Bank Trap, Second Edition: How to Escape From the $20 Trillion Monetary Expansion Unharmed. Business Expert Press. ISBN 978-1949443684.
- Lacalle, Daniel (2020). Freedom or Equality: The Key to Prosperity Through Social Capitalism. Post Hill Press. ISBN 978-1642934335.
