= Spanish Air and Space Force =

Air and Space warfare branch of Spain's armed forces

- Ejército del Aire y del Espacio
- Emblem of the Air and Space Force
- Founded: 7 October 1939; 87 years ago
- Country: Spain
- Type: Air and space force
- Role: Aerial and space warfare
- Size: 26,953 personnel (2025); 414 aircraft
- Part of: Spanish Armed Forces
- Headquarters: General Headquarters of the Air and Space Force, Madrid
- Patron: Our Lady of Loreto
- Mottos: Latin: Per aspera ad astra; "Through hardships to the stars"
- March: Spanish Air and Space Force Anthem
- Anniversaries: 10 December
- Engagements: Rif War; Spanish Civil War; World War II; Ifni War; Yugoslav wars; Kosovo War; Libyan Civil War
- Website: ejercitodelaire.defensa.gob.es

Commanders
- Commander-in-Chief (Captain General): King Felipe VI
- Chief of Staff: Air General Francisco Braco Carbó

Insignia
- Roundel

- Fin flash

Aircraft flown
- Attack: MQ-9 Reaper
- Electronic warfare: Falcon 20
- Fighter: C.15, C.16
- Helicopter: AS532 Cougar, AS332 Super Puma, NH90
- Trainer helicopter: Eurocopter EC135, Colibrí, Sikorsky S-76
- Patrol: CASA CN-235
- Reconnaissance: Cessna Citation V, MQ-9 Reaper
- Trainer: CE.16, CE.15, F-5, Pilatus PC-21, CASA C-101
- Transport: Airbus C295, CASA CN-235, CASA C-212, King Air, A400M, Airbus A310, A330, Falcon 900
- Tanker: A400M, A330 MRTT

The Spanish Air and Space Force (Spanish: Ejército del Aire y del Espacio, lit. 'Army of the Air and Space') is the aerial and space warfare branch of the Spanish Armed Forces. It is part of the Ministry of Defence and is one of the three constitutionally recognized military branches.

The Spanish Air Force traces its origins to 28 February 1913, when King Alfonso XIII issued a royal decree creating the "Military Aeronautical Service" within the Spanish Army. This service functioned as the air branch of the Armed Forces until the Spanish Civil War, when it split into two factions. After the war, the current Air Force was created. In June 2022, it was renamed as "Air and Space Force" to reflect the new space capabilities this branch has acquired in recent years.

== History ==
=== Early stages ===
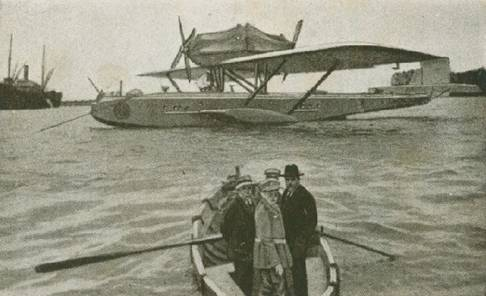
The Plus Ultra at Palos de la Frontera

Hot air balloons have been used with military purposes in Spain as far back as 1896. In 1905, with the help of Alfredo Kindelán, Leonardo Torres Quevedo directed the construction of the first Spanish dirigible in the Army Military Aerostatics Service, created in 1896 and located in Guadalajara. The new airship was completed successfully in 1908 and, named 'Torres Quevedo', made numerous test and exhibition flights.

The Spanish Army's air arm, however, took off formally in 1909 when Colonel Pedro Vives and Captain Alfredo Kindelán made an official trip to different European cities to check the potential of introducing airships and airplanes in the Spanish Armed Forces. One year later, a Royal decree established the National Aviation School (Escuela Nacional de Aviación (civil)) in Getafe, near Madrid, under the Ministry of Development (Ministerio de Fomento).

The established institution became militarized under the name Aeronáutica Española when Colonel Pedro Vives was chosen to lead it as director of the Aeronáutica Militar, Military Aeronautics, the name of the air arm of the Spanish Army. Captain Alfredo Kindelán was named Chief of Aviation, Jefe de Aviación.

On 17 December 1913, during the war with Morocco, a Spanish expeditionary squadron of the Aeronáutica Española became the first organized military air unit to see combat during the first systematic bombing in history by dropping aerial bombs from a Lohner Flecha (Arrow) airplane on the plain of Ben Karrix in Morocco. During the years that followed, most of the military activity of the Spanish Air Force would take place in Northern Morocco.

In 1915 Spain's first seaplane base was opened at Los Alcázares on the Mar Menor in the Murcia region and Alfredo Kindelán was named Military Aeronautics Director, displacing Pedro Vives. The Catalan Flying School was established in Can Tunis, Barcelona the following year and Getafe Aerodrome became a full-fledged military air base. In 1919 General Francisco Echagüe replaced Kindelán as leader of the Aeronáutica Española.

In 1920 two Nieuport 80 and one Caudron G.3 were first painted with squadron identification numbers and the Spanish Air Force roundel. Shortly thereafter the Aeronáutica Naval, the air branch of the Spanish Navy, already established through a Royal decree four years earlier, became functional in El Prat, in the same location as present-day Barcelona Airport.

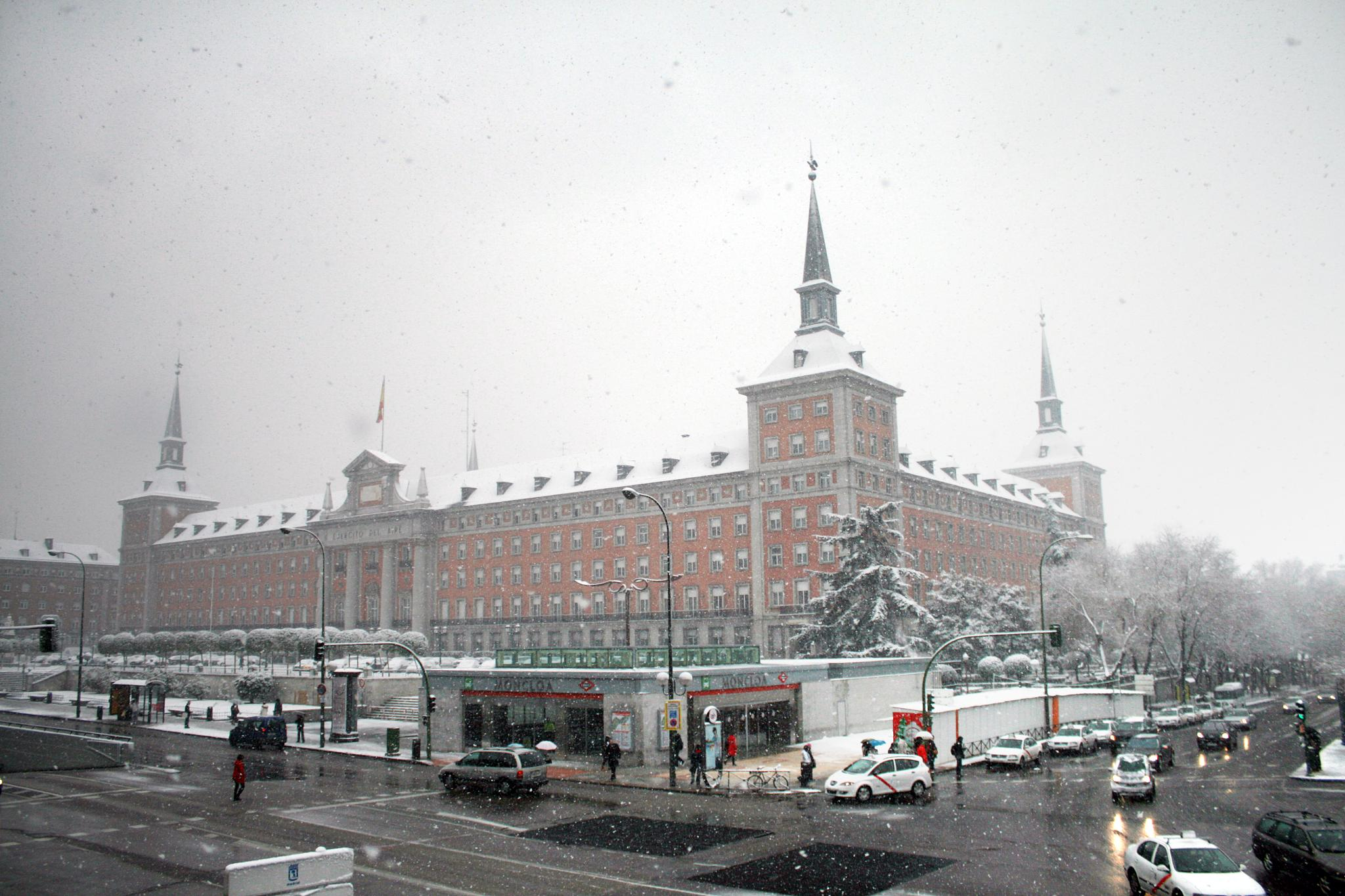
Headquarters of the Spanish Air and Space Force in Madrid

In 1921, following the Spanish defeat at Annual, known as Desastre de Annual in Spain, the Zeluán Aerodrome was taken over by the Rif army and another aerodrome was built at Nador. Lieutenant Colonel Kindelán was named Jefe Superior de Aeronáutica, becoming chief-commander of the air force in 1926, at the time when Spanish Morocco was retaken and the Rif War ended.

In 1926 a crew of Spanish aviators, that included Ramón Franco, Julio Ruiz de Alda, Juan Manuel Duran and Pablo Rada, completed the first Trans-Atlantic flight between Spain and South America in January 1926 on the Plus Ultra. That same year, pilots González Gallarza, Joaquín Loriga Taboada and Rafael Martínez Esteve completed the first flight between Spain and the Philippines, in just one month. The expedition was flown with two Breguet 19 and known as the Escuadrilla Elcano or "Elcano Squadron".

In 1930 the Aeronaval Base in San Javier was established and in the same year a pro-Republican revolt in the Cuatro Vientos military aerodrome near Madrid was quashed. After the proclamation of the Second Spanish Republic in 1931, General Luis Lombarte Serrano replaced Kindelán as chief-commander of the air force, but he would be quickly succeeded by Commander Ramón Franco, younger brother of later dictator Francisco Franco. Captain Cipriano Rodríguez Díaz and Lieutenant Carlos de Haya González flew non-stop to Equatorial Guinea, then a Spanish colonial outpost. Under Capitan Warlela cadastral surveys of Spain were carried out using modern methods of aerial photography in 1933. The following year Spanish engineer Juan de la Cierva took off and landed on seaplane carrier Dédalo with his autogyro C-30P. In 1934 Commander Eduardo Sáenz de Buruaga became new chief-commander of the air force.

Following a Government decree dated 2d October 1935, the Dirección General de Aeronáutica was placed under the authority of the War Ministry, Ministerio de la Guerra, instead of under the Presidencia del Gobierno, following which in 1936 the Air Force regional units became restructured. Accordingly, the Spanish Navy-based Escuadra model was replaced by Región Militardivisions which are still operative today.

=== Air warfare in the Spanish Civil War ===
After the military rebellion that triggered the Spanish Civil War, Spanish military aviation was divided into the Air Force of the Spanish republican government and the National Aviation (Aviación Nacional), established by the rebel army.

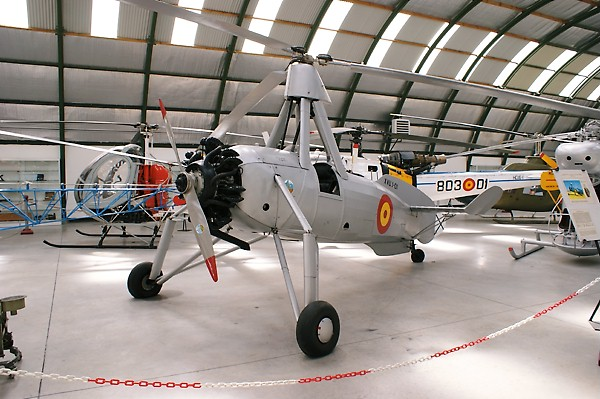
Spanish Cierva C.30 autogyro

In July 1936, right after the coup, the first German Junkers Ju 52 and Italian Savoia-Marchetti SM.81 arrived to help the rebels and the Fiat CR.32 fighters began operating in the Córdoba front. In August Heinkel He 51 fighters were also deployed. These planes helped the rebel army to gain full control of the air, as did the German and Italian expeditionary forces, the Condor Legion and the Aviazione Legionaria. At first, the Spanish Republican Air Force had the control of great swathes of Spanish territory using a motley selection of planes, but the unwavering help received by Francisco Franco from Nazi Germany and Fascist Italy reversed the situation. In September 1936 the Navy and Air Ministry, Ministerio de Marina y Aire, and the Air Undersecretariat, Subsecretaria del Aire were established under the command of Indalecio Prieto as minister. The first serious air combat took place over Madrid when Italian bombers attacked the city in a massive bombing operation. In the reorganization of the military in the areas of Spain that had remained loyal to the government, the new military structure of the republic merged the Aeronáutica Militar and the Aeronáutica Naval, the former being the air arm of the Spanish Republican Army and the latter the naval aviation of the Spanish Republican Navy, and formed the Spanish Republican Air Force. The Republican tricolor roundel was replaced by red bands for identification purposes, an insignia that had previously been used on Aeronáutica Naval aircraft during the monarchy in the 1920s, before the time of the Republic.

Many innovative, and often lethal, aeronautical bombing techniques were tested by Germany's Condor Legion forces on Spanish soil against the areas that remained loyal to the Republican Government with the permission of Generalísimo Franco. Nazi help to the Nationalist Air Force was part of Hitler's German rearmament strategy and the techniques that German Nazi pilots learned in Spain would later be used in World War II. Despite the devastation and the human casualties caused by the bombing of the Basque city of Guernica in 1937, known by the Luftwaffe as Operation Rügen, Hitler insisted that his longterm designs in Spain were peaceful. He called his strategy "Blumenkrieg" (Flower War), as evidenced in a January 1937 speech. The international outcry over Guernica, however, would not bring about any increase in the military help provided to the beleaguered Spanish Republic. The pilots of the Spanish Republican Air Force, often young and poorly trained were unable to check the Nazi German and Fascist Italian modern-warfare attacks. Despite Franco's claim that both air forces were equal, and despite the help of foreign pilots, Spanish Republican planes were mostly obsolete and often in a bad state of disrepair. Even after acquiring more planes from the Soviet Union in the mid-stages of the war, the Spanish Republican Air Force was no longer able to control the Spanish skies nor match the power of the German and Italian expeditionary forces in specific combat situations.

The Spanish Republican Air Force became practically irrelevant after the Battle of the Ebro in 1938 when the root of the Spanish Republican Armed Forces was broken. Finally it was completely disbanded after the victory on April 1, 1939.

=== Post-Civil War era ===
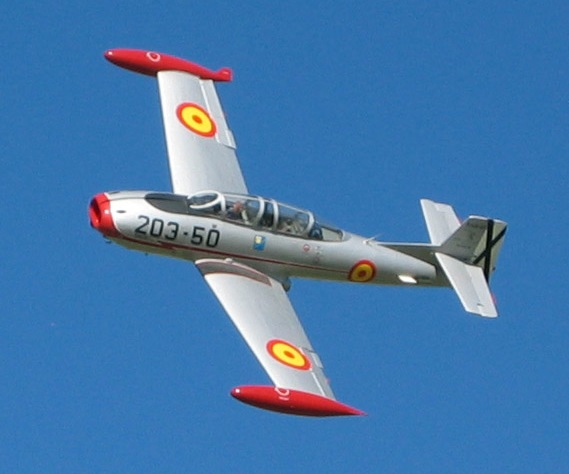
A Spanish Hispano HA-200 "Saeta" (Bolt)

The present Spanish Air Force (Ejército del Aire, or EdA) was officially established on 7 October 1939, after the end of the Spanish Civil War. The EdA was a successor to the Nationalist and Republican Air Forces. Spanish Republican colors disappeared and the black roundel of the planes was replaced by a yellow and red roundel. However, the black and white Saint Andrew's Cross (Spanish: Aspa de San Andrés) fin flash, the tail insignia of Franco's air force, as well as of the Aviazione Legionaria of Fascist Italy and the Condor Legion of Nazi Germany, is still in use in the present-day Spanish Air Force.

After the changes introduced at the beginning of Franco's regime the Air Regions and their Command centres were the following:

- 1st Air Region. Central.
- 2nd Air Region. Straits.
- 3rd Air Region. East.
- 4th Air Region. Pyrenees.
- 5th Air Region. Atlantic.
- Balearic Islands Air Zone
- Morocco Air Zone
- Canary Islands and West Africa Air Zone

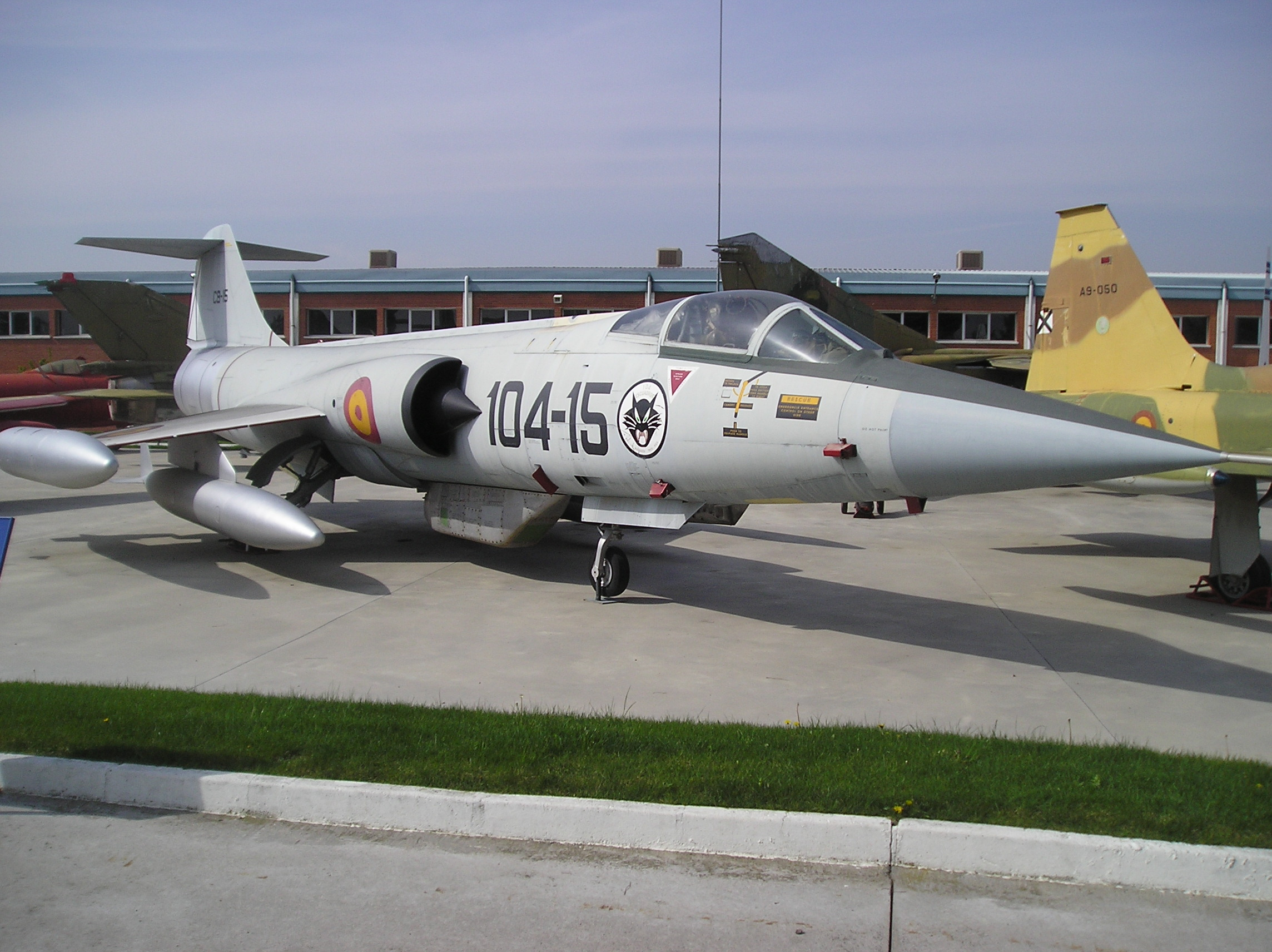
Former F-104 Starfighter of the Spanish Air Force

The Blue Squadron (Escuadrillas Azules) was an air unit that fought alongside the Axis powers at the time of the Blue Division, Division Azul Spanish volunteer formation in World War II. The Escuadrilla azul operated with the Luftwaffe on the Eastern Front and took part in the battle of Kursk. This squadron was the "15 Spanische Staffel"/JG 27 Afrika of the VIII Fliegerkorps, Luftflotte 2.

During the first years after World War II the Spanish Francoist Air Force consisted largely of German and Italian planes and copies of them. An interesting example was the HA-1112-M1L Buchón (Pouter), this was essentially a licensed production of the Messerschmitt Bf 109 re-engined with a Rolls-Royce Merlin 500-45 for use in Spain.

In March 1946 the first Spanish military paratroop unit, the Primera Bandera de la Primera Legión de Tropas de Aviación, was established in Alcalá de Henares. It first saw action in the Ifni War during 1957 and 1958. Because of US Government objection to use airplanes manufactured in the US in her colonial struggles after World War II, Spain used at first old German aircraft, such as the T-2 (Junkers 52, nicknamed "Pava"), the B-2I (Heinkel 111, nicknamed "Pedro"), the C-4K (Spanish version of the Bf 109, nicknamed "Buchón"), and some others. Still, Grumman Albatross seaplanes and Sikorsky H-19B helicopters were used in rescue operations. This is why still now in present times, EdA maintains a policy of having jet fighters from two different origins, one first line fighter of North American origin, and one from French-European origin (F-4C Phantom / Mirage F1, Mirage III; EF-18A / Eurofighter Typhoon).

Although in sheer numbers the EdA was impressive, at the end of World War II technically it had become more or less obsolete due to the progress in aviation technology during the war. For budget reasons Spain actually kept many of the old German aircraft operative well into the 1950s and 1960s. As an example the last Junkers Ju 52 used to operate in Escuadrón 721 training parachutists from Alcantarilla Air Base near Murcia, until well into the 1970s. The CASA 352 and the CASA 352L were developments built by CASA in the 1950s.

Links were established in the 1950s with the United States. Spain received its first jets, like the F-86 Sabre and Lockheed T-33 together with training and transport planes like the T-6 Texan, C-47 and C-54, and the Beechcraft T-34 Mentor. The first series of American jets was replaced in the 1960s by newer fighters like the F-104 Starfighter, F-4C Phantom and F-5 Freedom Fighter

=== Present times ===
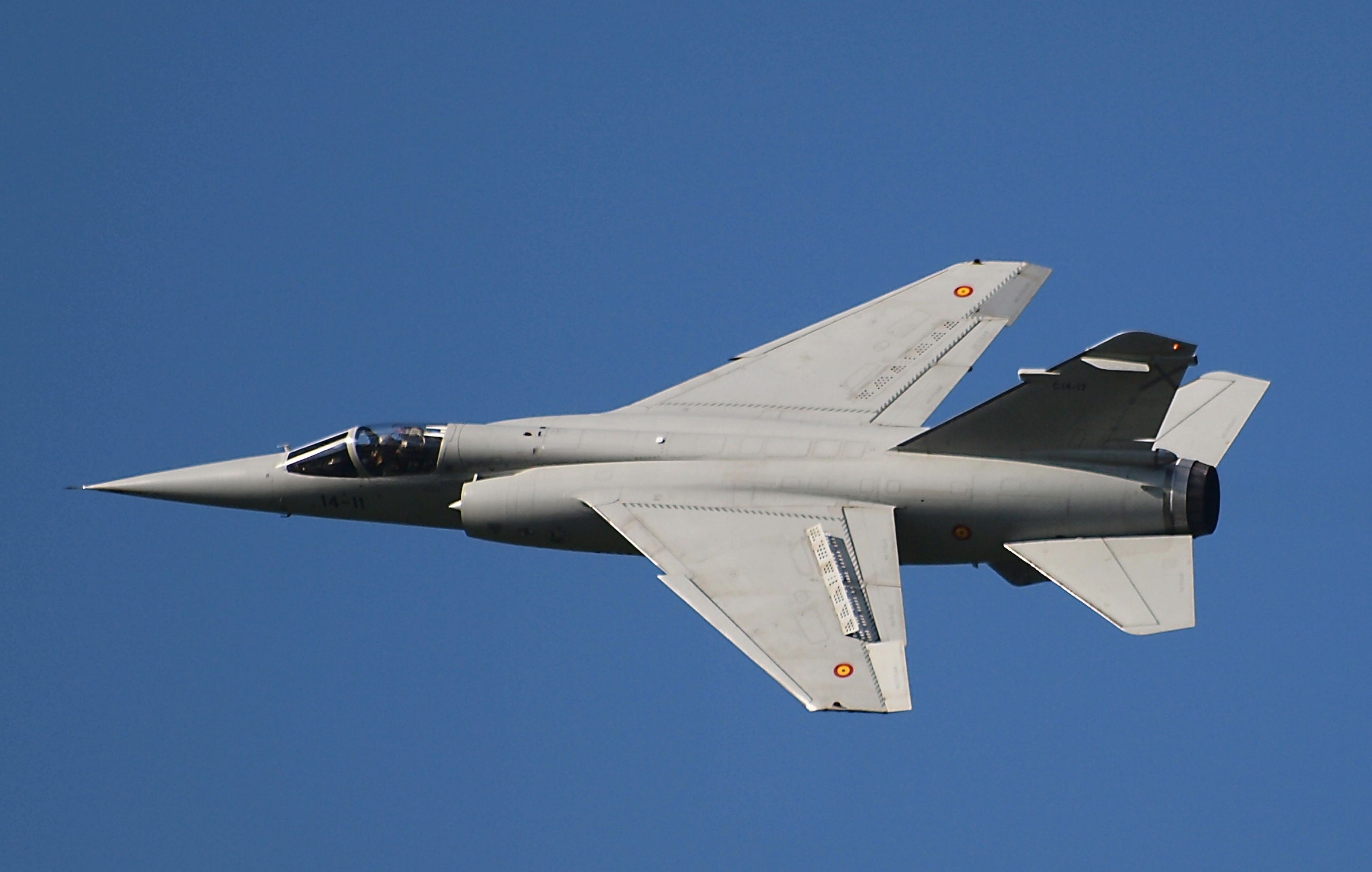
Spanish Dassault Mirage F1

After the death of dictator Franco in 1975 and the ensuing Spanish transition to democracy years, the organization and equipment of the Spanish Air Force was again modernised to prepare for Spain's membership of NATO in 1982. Planes like the Mirage III and Mirage F1 were bought from France and became the backbone of the Air Force during the 1970s and part of the 1980s. French fighters formed the air force's mainstay until the arrival of the American F/A-18. Spanish F/A-18s participated in the Bosnian War and the Kosovo War under NATO command, based in Aviano, Italy. Assisted by USAF F-16s, Spanish Air Force EF-18As dropped laser-guided bombs on Bosnian Serb ammunition depots at Pale, on 25 and 26 May 1994.

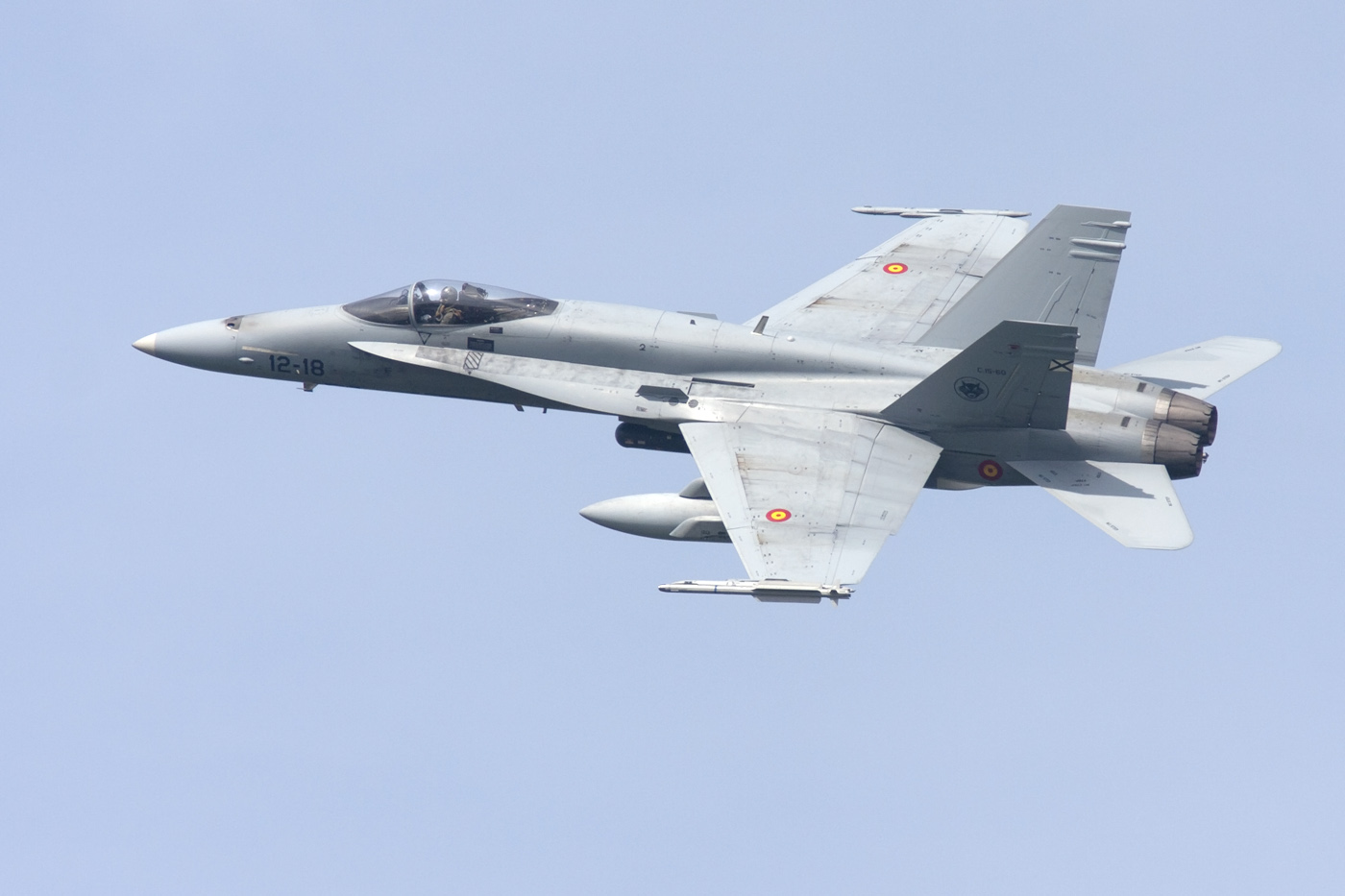
EF-18A taking off and banking to the left in 2015

The Spanish Air and Space Force is replacing older aircraft in the inventory with newer ones including Eurofighter Typhoon and the recently introduced Airbus A400M Atlas airlifter. Both are manufactured with Spanish participation; EADS CASA makes the Eurofighter's right wing and leading edge slats, and participates in the testing and assembly of the airlifter.

Unlike the air forces of most major NATO member states, the Spanish Air and Space Force currently do not operate any AEW&C aircraft.

Its aerobatic display team is the Patrulla Aguila, which flies the CASA C-101 Aviojet. Its helicopter display team, Patrulla Aspa, flies the Eurocopter EC-120 Colibrí.

In July 2014 the Spanish Air Force joined the European Air Transport Command, headquartered at Eindhoven Airbase in the Netherlands.

The Spanish Government announced in June 2022 that the Spanish Air Force would be renamed as the Spanish Air and Space Force.

On January 9, 2024, the Space Command was formally established.

== Organization ==
The basic organization of the Air and Space Force is the following:

- Chief of Staff of the Air and Space Force (JEMAE)
  - Air and Space Force Headquarters (CGEAE) in Madrid
  - Combat Air Command (MACOM) at Torrejón Air Base
  - General Air Command (MAGEN) in Madrid
  - Canary Islands Air Command (MACAN) in Las Palmas
  - Logistic Support command (MALOG) in Madrid
  - Personnel Command (MAPER) in Madrid
  - Economic Affairs Directorate (DAE) in Madrid

=== Force structure ===
The main operational formation of the SAF is the ala (wing), roughly equivalent to an army brigade. An ala is normally composed of three grupos (groups, army regiment equivalents) - an operations group called Grupo de Fuerzas Aéreas (Air Force Group, shortened to Grupo and followed by a numerical) including the aviation squadrons and a flight operations support squadron. An operations group is normally composed of two or three escuadrones (squadrons), each one normally consisting of 18 to 24 aircraft. Thus, Ala 15, with its base in Zaragoza Air Base, is formed by two squadrons with 18 F/A-18s each. Another group within the wing is the Grupo de Material, providing maintenance and repairs to the aircraft, their weapons and systems. The Grupo de Apoyo completes the typical wing structure and it is the air base group, providing the functioning of the air base as a military installation. A variation of the wing structure is the Ala 11 in Morón de la Frontera air base, which has not one, but two operational groups. The Grupo 11 operates Eurofighter aircraft in the multi-mission fighter role, while the Grupo 22 operates P-3 Orion aircraft in the maritime patrol and ASW role and correspondingly there are two separate maintenance squadrons for the two aircraft types.

Smaller operational units are the separate groups. They are also army regiment equivalents, but unlike the wings they are composite units, in which the operational aircraft, the maintenance and the air base squadrons report directly to the group. Such example is the 47/o. Grupo Mixto de Fuerzas Aéreas (47th Air Force Composite Group) a mixed intelligence, electronic warfare and aerial navigation systems calibration unit at Torrejón de Ardoz air base.

When an air base houses more than one ala or multiple separate grupos, the function of a lodger unit is provided by an air force installation unit (an army regiment equivalent) called Groupment of the ... Air Force Base (Agrupación de la Base Aérea de ...). Three such examples are the Agrupación de la Base Aérea de Torrejon, the Agrupación de la Base Aérea de Cuatro Vientos and the Agrupación de la Base Aérea de Zaragoza. An agrupación could be responsible for the support of air force operations at more than one airfield (military or civilian). As an example the Groupment of the Zaragoza Air Force Base is responsible for the mixed use military / civilian airfields of Zaragoza, Logroño-Agoncillo and Huesca-Pirineos. An air force base, which does not house flying units is classified as an Acuartelamiento Aéreo (roughly translated as Air Force Installation in English, one such example is the Acuartelamiento Aéreo Bardenas, supporting the Bardenas Reales training range) and an airfield, which does not house permanently flying units is classified as an Aerodromo Militar (military airfield), such as the Aerodromo Militar de Pollensa.

=== Air bases ===
- Alcantarilla Air Base
- Armilla Air Base
- Cuatro Vientos Air Base
- Gando Air Base
- Getafe Air Base
- Los Llanos Air Base
- Matacán Air Base
- Morón Air Base
- San Javier Air Base
- Santiago Air Base
- Son Sant Joan Air Base
- Talavera Air Base
- Torrejón Air Base
- Villanubla Air Base
- Zaragoza Air Base

==== Defunct air bases ====
- Agoncillo Air Base (FAMET base now)
- Manises Air Base (Part of Valencia Airport)
- Reus Air Base (Now as Reus Airport)
- Villafría Air Base

== Aircraft ==
=== Current inventory ===
Aircraft	Spanish designation	Image	Origin	Type	Variant	In service	Notes
Combat aircraft
F/A-18 Hornet	C.15; C.15M (MLU); CE.15		United States	Multirole	EF-18A+ EF-18M	69	1 crashed in 2024
F/A-18 Hornet	C.15; C.15M (MLU); CE.15		United States	Conversion trainer	EF-18B+ EF-18BM	12	Provides conversion training
Eurofighter Typhoon	C.16		Germany; Italy; Spain; United Kingdom	Swingrole	T1	17	Modernised to OFP-02 standard.
Eurofighter Typhoon	C.16		Germany; Italy; Spain; United Kingdom	Swingrole	T2	33	
Eurofighter Typhoon	C.16		Germany; Italy; Spain; United Kingdom	Swingrole	T3A	20	
Eurofighter Typhoon	C.16		Germany; Italy; Spain; United Kingdom	Swingrole	T4	0/45	
Maritime patrol
Airbus C295	D.6		Spain	Patrol / SAR	C295 MSA	1/8	First C295 MSA delivered in 2026
Airbus C295	D.6		Spain	Maritime Patrol	C295 MPA	0/8	8 Ordered, first aircraft scheduled for delivery in 2028
CASA CN-235	D.4		Spain	Patrol / SAR	CN-235 D.4 VIGMA	8	To be replaced by 16 C-295.
Reconnaissance
Cessna Citation V	TR.20		United States	Aerial reconnaissance	–	3	
Aerial refueling / Transport
Airbus A330 MRTT	TK.24		France; Germany; United Kingdom; Spain	Multirole: Aerial refueling; Transport	A330-200 MRTT	2/6	3 converted
Airbus A400M	T.23		France; Germany; United Kingdom; Spain	Multirole: Strategic transport; Tactical airlifter	–	14	6 more on order
Transport
Airbus A330	T.24		France; Germany; United Kingdom	Military transport	A330-200	1	
CASA C-212	T.12		Spain	Tactical airlifter	CASA 212-100	7	Being replaced by the C295MW.
CASA CN-235	T.19		Spain	Tactical airlifter	CN235-100M	7	Being replaced by the C295MW.
Airbus C295	T.21		Spain	Tactical airlifter	C295MW	13/31	18 C295MW ordered.
King Air	U.22		United States	Utility	C90A	3	
VIP transport
Airbus A310	T.22		France; Germany; United Kingdom	VIP transport	A310-300	2	
Dassault Falcon 900	T.18		France	VIP transport	Falcon 900B	5	
Aerial firefighting
Bombardier CL-215	UD.13		Canada	Water bomber	–	10	
Bombardier CL-415	UD.14		Canada	Water bomber	–	4	
Helicopters
NHIndustries NH90	HD.29 Lobo		France; Germany; Italy; Netherlands; Spain	Utility	TTH	12/24	Orders: Batch 1: 6 purchased and in service; Batch 2: 6 purchased and in service; Batch 3: 12 ordered
AS332 Super Puma	HD.21/HT.21		France	CSAR / Utility / VIP transport	AS332B/B1	10	4 used as VIP transport, to be replaced by the Airbus H175. The other are being replaced with the NH90 TTH.
Eurocopter AS532 Cougar	HT.27		France	VIP transport	AS532 UL Cougar	2	To be replaced.
Sikorsky S-76	HE.24		United States	SAR / Trainer	S-76C	8	Being replaced by the H-135, and to be then used for SAR at the to 49th Wing.
Trainer aircraft
Pilatus PC-21	E.27		Switzerland	Advanced / basic trainer	–	40	
Northrop F-5	AE.9		United States	Lead-in fighter trainer	F-5BM; SF-5M	19	To be replaced with the TAI Hürjet.
Eurocopter EC120	HE.25		France	Rotorcraft trainer	–	15	
Airbus H135	–		Germany	Rotorcraft	TH135	11/23	12 more on order
UAV
MQ-9A Predator B	–		United States	MALE UCAV	MQ-9A Block 5	4	
Quantum Systems - Twister	–	–	Germany	Short range eVTOL sUAS	–	Unknown	
Satellites
Spainsat NG	Spainsat NG-1; Spainsat NG-2	–	France; Italy; Spain	Communications satellite	–	1	2 satellites ordered, one already in orbit. Geostationary orbit satellite, to operate in X-band, military K_{a}-band and UHF.

=== Future aircraft type ===
Aircraft	Image	Origin	Type	Variant	Quantity	Notes
Combat aircraft
Eurofighter Typhoon		Germany; Italy; Spain; United Kingdom	Swingrole	Tranche 4	20	Order under project Halcon I. The delivery is planned for 2026 - 2030.
Eurofighter Typhoon		Germany; Italy; Spain; United Kingdom	Swingrole	Tranche 4+	25	Order under the project Halcon II.
Trainer aircraft
TAI Hürjet		Turkey; Spain	Lead-in fighter trainer	–	30	Replacement of Northrop F-5BM. Spain and Turkey are collaborating on the project of this aircraft.
Maritime patrol
Airbus C295		Spain	Maritime surveillance	C295 MSA	8	
Airbus C295		Spain	Maritime patrol	C295 MPA	8	
Aerial refueling / Transport
Airbus A330 MRTT +	–	France; Germany; United Kingdom; Spain	Multirole: Aerial refueling; Transport	–	3	3 to be ordered
Aerial firefighting
DHC-515 (Viking Air)		Canada	Water bomber	–	7	
Liaison aircraft
Pilatus PC-24		Switzerland	Liaison aircraft	–	4	Part of a common order with the Navy, it will replace the 3 Cessna Citation V and the 4 Beechcraft C90 King Air. The delivery is planned for 2026 - 2027.
Helicopters
Airbus H175		France; Germany	VIP transport	H175M	6	6 ordered in December 2025.
Airbus H135		Germany	Light utility / observation / training	–	12	13 ordered in December 2025, 1 for the Navy, 12 for the Air Force.
UAV
Eurodrone		France; Germany; Italy; Spain	MALE UAV	–	12	12 aircraft as part of 4 systems.
SIRTAP	—	Spain; Colombia	ISR	–	27	

== Equipment ==
=== Current armament ===
Name	Image	Origin	Type	Variant	Aircraft	Range	Notes
Air-to-air missile
IRIS-T		Germany; Italy; Sweden; Greece; Norway; Spain	Short-range air-to-air missile	IRIS-T AAM	F/A-18 Hornet; Eurofighter Typhoon	25 km (13 nmi)	Between 2007 and 2011, 700 missiles were delivered.
AIM-9 Sidewinder		United States	Short-range air-to-air missile	AIM-9 L/I	F/A-18 Hornet	18 km (9.7 nmi)	
AIM-9 Sidewinder		United States	Short-range air-to-air missile	AIM-9 JULI	F/A-18 Hornet	18 km (9.7 nmi)	
AIM-7 Sparrow		United States	BVR air-to-air missile	AIM-7P	F/A-18 Hornet	70 km (38 nmi)	100 purchased
AIM-120 AMRAAM		United States	BVR air-to-air missile	AIM-120A/B	F/A-18 Hornet	64 km (35 nmi)	
AIM-120 AMRAAM		United States	BVR air-to-air missile	AIM-120C-7/8	F/A-18 Hornet; Eurofighter Typhoon	160 km (86 nmi)	100 ordered in 2020, 68 in 2023, additional ones in 2024
Meteor (missile)		United Kingdom; Germany; France; Italy; Spain; Sweden	BVR air-to-air missile		Eurofighter Typhoon	200 km (110 nmi)	At least 100 missiles delivered from a batch of 232 missiles.
Air-to-surface missile
AGM-65 Maverick		United States	Tactical air-to-ground missile	AGM-65G	F/A-18 Hornet	27 km (15 nmi)	250 purchased
AGM-84 Harpoon		United States	Anti-ship cruise missile	AGM-84D	F/A-18 Hornet	90 to 120 km (49 to 65 nmi)	
AGM-88 HARM		United States	Anti-radiation missile		F/A-18 Hornet	150 km (81 nmi)	Purchased in the 1990s.
Taurus KEPD 350		Germany; Sweden	Land-attack cruise missile (anti-bunker capability)		F/A-18 Hornet	> 500 km (270 nmi)	46 missiles were delivered between 2008 and 2010
Guided bombs
BPG-2000 Paveway III		Spain; United States	Laser guided bombs	—	F/A-18 Hornet; Eurofighter Typhoon		Bomb made by Expal, guidance kit supplied by the USA. 2,000 lb (910 kg)
GBU-16 Paveway II		United States	Laser guided bombs	—	F/A-18 Hornet; Eurofighter Typhoon	14.8 km (8.0 nmi)	It uses the Mk-83 bomb. 1,000 lb (450 kg)
GBU-48 Enhanced Paveway II (EP2)		United States	Laser guided bombs	—	F/A-18 Hornet; Eurofighter Typhoon	9.7 km (5.2 nmi)	It uses the Mk-83 bomb. 1,000 lb (450 kg)
GBU-10 Paveway II		United States	Laser guided bombs	—	F/A-18 Hornet; Eurofighter Typhoon	9.7 km (5.2 nmi)	It uses the Mk-84 bomb. 2,000 lb (910 kg)
GBU-24 Paveway III		United States	Laser guided bombs	—	F/A-18 Hornet; Eurofighter Typhoon	17 km (9.2 nmi)	It uses the Mk-84 bomb. 2,000 lb (910 kg)
General-purpose bomb
Mark 82 bomb		United States	General-purpose bomb		F/A-18 Hornet	—	
BR-250	—	Spain	General-purpose bomb	—	F/A-18 Hornet	—	

=== Air defence ===
Name	Image	Origin	Type	Variant	Range	Quantity	Notes
Air defence
NASAMS "National Advanced Surface-to-Air Missile System"		Norway; United States	Short range air defence fire unit	NASAMS-2+	—	0 (+1)	1 fire unit on order by the air force to replace the Spada 2000 assigned to the Air Deployment Support Squadron. 4 units previously purchased for the Army in 2003. Equipment: 1 Kongsberg FDC (20 ft shelter on Iveco M320); 1 AN/MPQ-64F1 Sentinel (on Vamtac with a generator on another Vamtac); 1 EOS system (on Vamtac); 1 common communication station for sensors (on Vamtac); 3 NASAMS Mk 2 launchers (on Iveco M320); 1 communication node (on Iveco M320); 3 maintenance 20 ft shelters (Iveco M320)AIM-120 C8 AMRAAM and / or AIM-120ER AMRAAM
Aspide	(Illustration)	Italy; Spain; Switzerland	Deployable SHORAD for air base protection	Spada 2000	—	Unknown	Equipment: Thomson-CSF RAC 3D surveillance radar; Oerlikon Contraves Skyguard guidance radar and command system; AIM-7 Sparrow
Mistral		France; Spain	V/SHORAD	Mistral-3 mobile launcher	—	Unknown	Equipment: URO Vamtac ST5; Mistral ATLAS-RC remote controlled launcher; Mistral-3 missile
Air surveillance - fixed radars
Alenia RAT-31	(Illustration)	Italy	S-band (IEEE), early warming radar	RAT-31 SL/T	470 km (290 mi)	4	Being replaced by the Lanza 3D LRR at the EVA 2, 5, 12 and 22.
Lanza 3D	(Illustration)	Spain	Modular pulsed, 3D, L-band (IEEE), early warming radar	Lanza 3D LRR; Long Range Radar	474 km (295 mi)	4	Ordered in 2021 for the air surveillance. It will equip the EVA 2, 5, 12 and 22. It succeeds to the Alenia Marconi Systems radars.
Air surveillance - mobile radars
AN/TPS-43		United States	3D, S-band (IEEE), early warming radar	TPS-43M	450 km (280 mi)	1	The radar has been in service sinve 2001. The air force transports the radar with a Mercedes Atego.
Lanza 3D	(Illustration)	Spain	Modular pulsed, 3D, L-band (IEEE), early warming radar	Lanza T / LTR-25; Long-range Tactical Radar	460 km (290 mi)	1	Ordered in 2021 for the air surveillance. It succeeds to the Alenia Marconi Systems radars.
Precision approach radar
GCA 2000		Spain	Mobile precision approach radar	GCA 2000T	—	2	Mobile precision approach radar purchased in 2008. It is used on the Albacete and Morón air bases.
Puesto móvil de mando on Iveco Pegaso M-250		Italy; Spain	Mobile ATC	—	—	—	Operated by the Unidad Militar de Emergencias (UME).

=== Vehicles ===
Name	Image	Origin	Type	Quantity	Notes
Firefighting trucks
Iveco Magirus Dragon X6 ARFF		Germany; Italy	Airport crash tender 6×6 chassis	—	Chassis from Iveco, firefighting tender made by Magirus.
Protec-Fire Iturri Toro	—	Spain	Airport crash tender 6×6 chassis	—	2 ordered in 2020.
Protec-Fire Iturri Toro VIM 61 MTEC		Spain	Airport crash tender 4×4 chassis	—	
Protec-Fire		Spain	Airport crash tender 6×6 chassis	—	Protec-Fire airport trender.
Protec-Fire Iturri Toro	—	Spain	Airport crash tender 4×4 chassis	—	Desert camo painting.
TBD	—	—	Airport crash tender	0	Budget of close to €40 million approved in August 2025 for a framework agreement to purchase new fire tenders.
Ambulances
URO Vamtac ambulance		Spain	Armoured ambulance	1	Purchased for use in Afghanistan.
Iveco Daily 4×4 SVA; Soporte Vital Avanzado	—	Italy; Spain	Military ambulance	—	Some for the air force.
Mercedes Sprinter 4×4	—	Germany; Spain	Civilian ambulance	5	Ordered to Stil Conversion in 2021, delivered in 2022.

== Aircraft identification ==
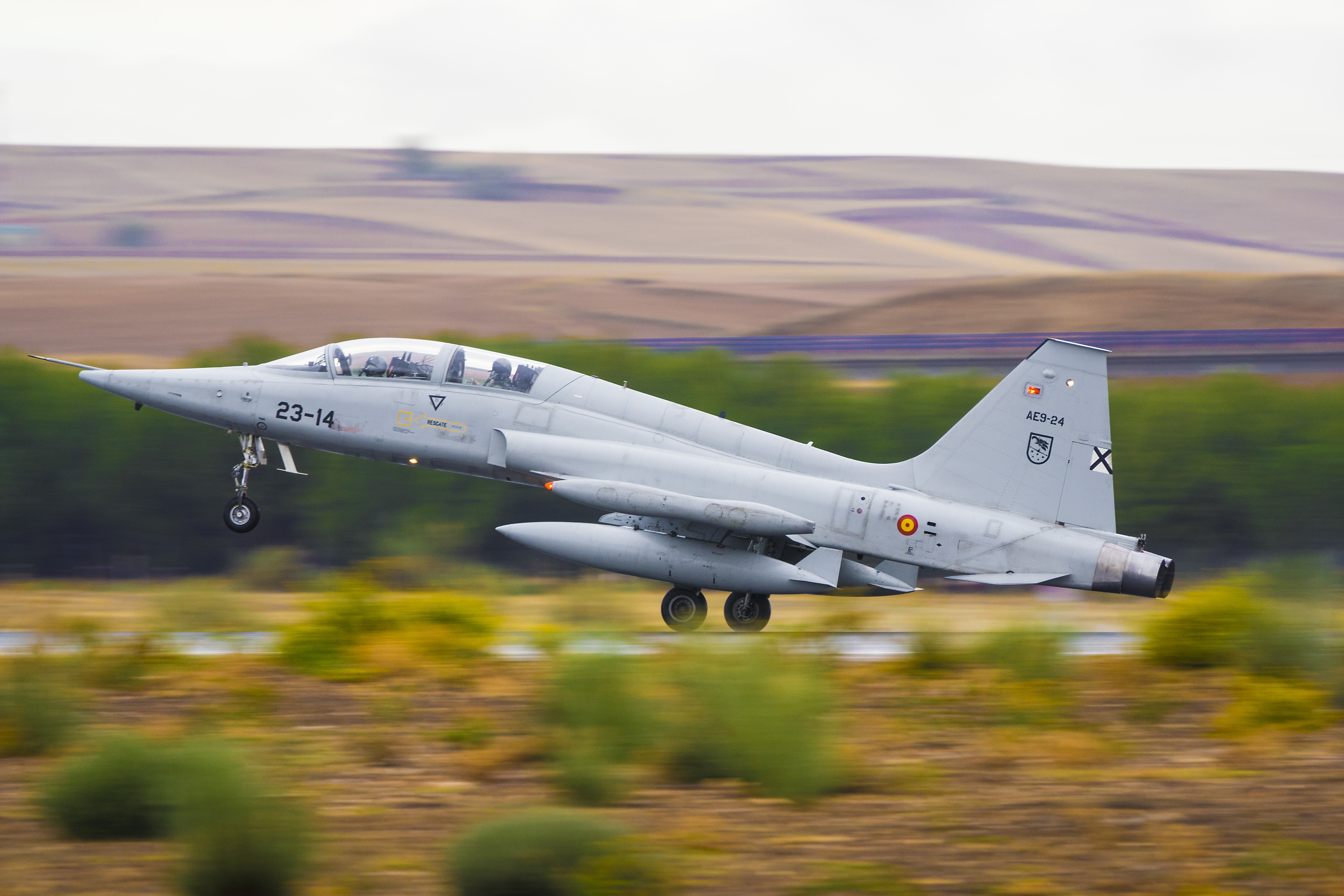
Northrop F-5 at Talavera la Real, identified with the serial prefix A (attack) E (training).9 in the Spanish system

The Spanish Air and Space Force has its own alphanumeric system for identifying aircraft. This forms a prefix to the airframe serial number, usually marked on the tail. The letter or letters, correspond to the use given. Thus, C means cazabombardero (fighter bomber); A, ataque (attack); P, patrulla (patrol); T, transporte (transport); E, enseñanza (training); D, search and rescue; H, helicopter; K, tanker; V, Vertical Take Off and Landing (VTOL); and U, utility. An example would be that the F/A-18 with "C.15-08" on the tail is the fifteenth type of fighter that arrived in the Spanish Air and Space Force (the Eurofighter is the C.16) and is the eighth example of this type to enter the SAF. On the nose or fuselage the aircraft has a numeral specific to the unit in which it is based.

Variants of planes in service, for example two-seater versions or tanker versions of transports planes, add another letter to differentiate their function, and have their own sequence of serial numbers separate from the primary versions. Example: "CE.15-02" will be the second F/A-18 two-seater (Fighter Trainer) delivered to the SAF. In addition, the aircraft used by the Spanish Air and Space Force usually carry a code consisting of one or two digits followed by a dash and two numbers, painted on the nose or fuselage. The first number corresponds to the unit to which they belong, and the second the order in which they entered service. Example: the fourth F/A-18 arriving at Ala 12 will have on the nose the code "12-04". Those codes do change when the aircraft is re-allocated to a different unit.

== Ranks ==
=== Officers ===
NATO code	OF-10	OF-9	OF-8	OF-7	OF-6	OF-5	OF-4	OF-3	OF-2	OF-1
Spanish Air and Space Force
Spanish Air and Space Force	Capitán general	General del Aire	Teniente general	General de división	General de brigada	Coronel	Teniente coronel	Comandante	Capitán	Teniente	Alférez

=== Non-commissioned officers and enlisted ===
NATO code	OR-9		OR-8	OR-7	OR-6	OR-5	OR-4	OR-3	OR-2	OR-1
Spanish Air and Space Force
Spanish Air and Space Force	Suboficial mayor	Subteniente	Brigada	Sargento primero	Sargento	Cabo mayor	Cabo primero	Cabo	Soldado de primera	Soldado

== Spanish air aces ==
=== Spanish Civil War ===
- Joaquín García-Morato y Castaño
- Julio Salvador Díaz-Benjumea
- Manuel Vázquez Sagastizábal
- Arístides García-López Rengel
- Miguel Zambudio Martínez
- Ángel Salas Larrazábal
- Miguel García Pardo
- Andrés García Calle
- Manuel Aguirre López
- Joaquín Velasco Fernández Nespral
- Carlos Bayo Alessandri
- Manuel Zarauza Clavero
- Juan Lario
- Javier Allende Isasi
- Esteban Ibarreche Arriaga
- Felipe del Rio Crespo
- Emilio O'Connor Valdivielso
- José Larios Fernández
- José María Bravo Fernández-Hermosa
- Leopoldo Morquillas Rubio

=== World War II ===
- Vicente Aldecoa Lecanda
- Dámaso Arango López
- Luis Azqueta Brunet
- Vicente Beltrán
- Fernando Bengoa Cremades
- Mariano Cuadra Medina
- Lorenzo Lucas Fernández Peña
- José Ramón Gavilán Ponce de León
- Antonio García Cano
- Juan Lario Sánchez
- José Luis Larrañaga
- Ángel Salas Larrazábal
- José Mateos Recio
- Bernardo Meneses Orozco
- Francisco Meroño Pellicer
- José Pascual Santamaría
- Fernando Sánchez Arjona Courtoy
- Manuel Sánchez-Tabernero de Prada
- Francisco Valiente Zárraga
- Manuel Zarauza Claver

== See also ==
- Aviazione Legionaria
- Bombing of Guernica
- Condor Legion
- German rearmament
- List of Lockheed F-104 Starfighter operators
- Museum of Aeronautics and Astronautics (Madrid)
- Patrulla Águila
- Emblems of the Spanish Air and Space Force
- Spanish Air and Space Force Anthem
- Spanish Civil War
- Spanish Republican Air Force
- Structure of the Spanish Air and Space Force

== Bibliography ==
- Avila Cruz, Gonzalo (January–February 2004). "Birth of a Modern Force: North American F-86F Sabres in Spain". Air Enthusiast (109): 29–45. ISSN 0143-5450.
- Mafé Huertas, Salvador (Spring 1994). "Spain's First 'Flat-Irons': The Mirage III Era". Air Enthusiast. No. 53. pp. 32–39. ISSN 0143-5450.
