= Joaquín Loriga =

Galician aviator

Joaquín Loriga Taboada (23 September 1895 in Lalín – 18 July 1927 in Cuatro Vientos Airport) was a Galician aviation pioneer. In 1926 as a captain, together with two pilots and three mechanical engineers, completed the first long-distance flight from Madrid to Manila of over eleven thousand miles.

The trip, which took 128 flight hours, hopped through North Africa, the Middle East, South Asia, Southeast Asia, Macao, Aparri in northern Luzon and then finally on to Manila. Only Loriga's plane completed the flight.

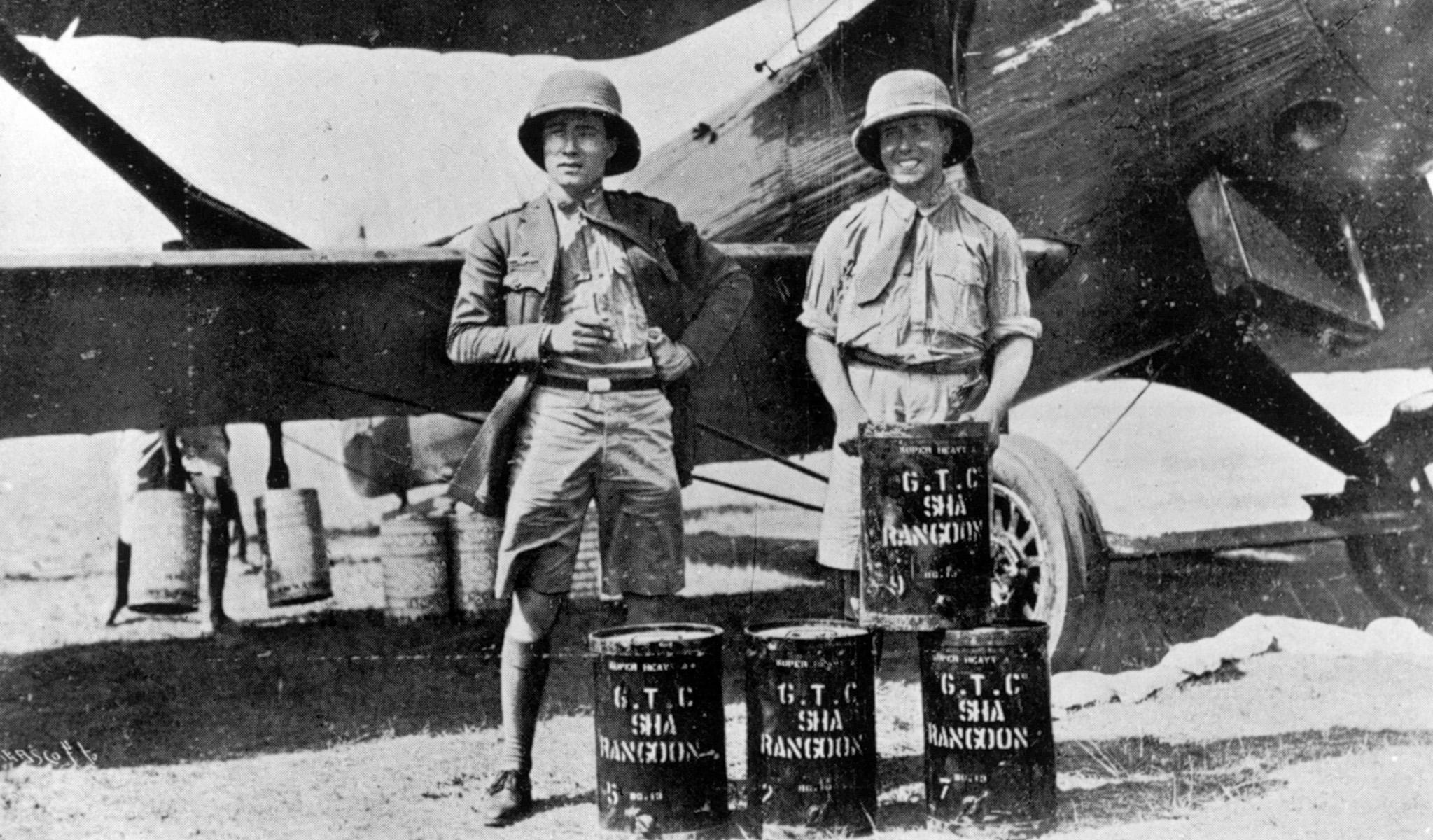
Gallarza and Loriga (on the right) during a layover in Yangon, 1926

== Career ==
Raised in a stately house known by the parish as Pazo de Liñares in Lalín, he joined the army and the pilots division of the Spanish Military Aviation Service in 1920.

=== Rif War ===
In 1922, during the Rif War, Loriga commanded the 3rd Squadron, operating the De Havilland DH-4, that provided air support to military bases surrounded by the local rebels. He distinguished himself in the relief of the besieged strongholds of Vélez de la Gomera and Miskrel-la, in March–April 1922. On 22 March 1924, in a combined operation with a squadron of Bristol F.2 Fighters commanded by Juan Antonio Ansaldo, his unit destroyed a Dorand AR.2, the only plane held by the Republic of the Rif, and hidden by the Rifians at Tizzi Moren, southwest of Alhucemas. Loriga was cited for bravery with the Militar Medal for his services during the war and promoted to work in the Cuatro Vientos Airport in the Spanish capital.

== First trip in Autogyro ==
At the end of 1924, the Captain Loriga, after studying eight months in the École nationale supérieure de l'aéronautique et de l'espace in Paris, decided to support the engineer Juan de la Cierva with a demonstration of his recent invention, the very first autogyro. On 9 December 1924, the captain flew it for a record 200 meters in his first practice. On 11 December, he repeated the demonstration in front of Commander Herrera and finally on 12 December flew it 12 km (7.4 mi) from Cuatro Vientos airfield to Getafe airfield in 8 minutes and 12 seconds, a world record for the autogyro.

== From Spain to the Philippines ==
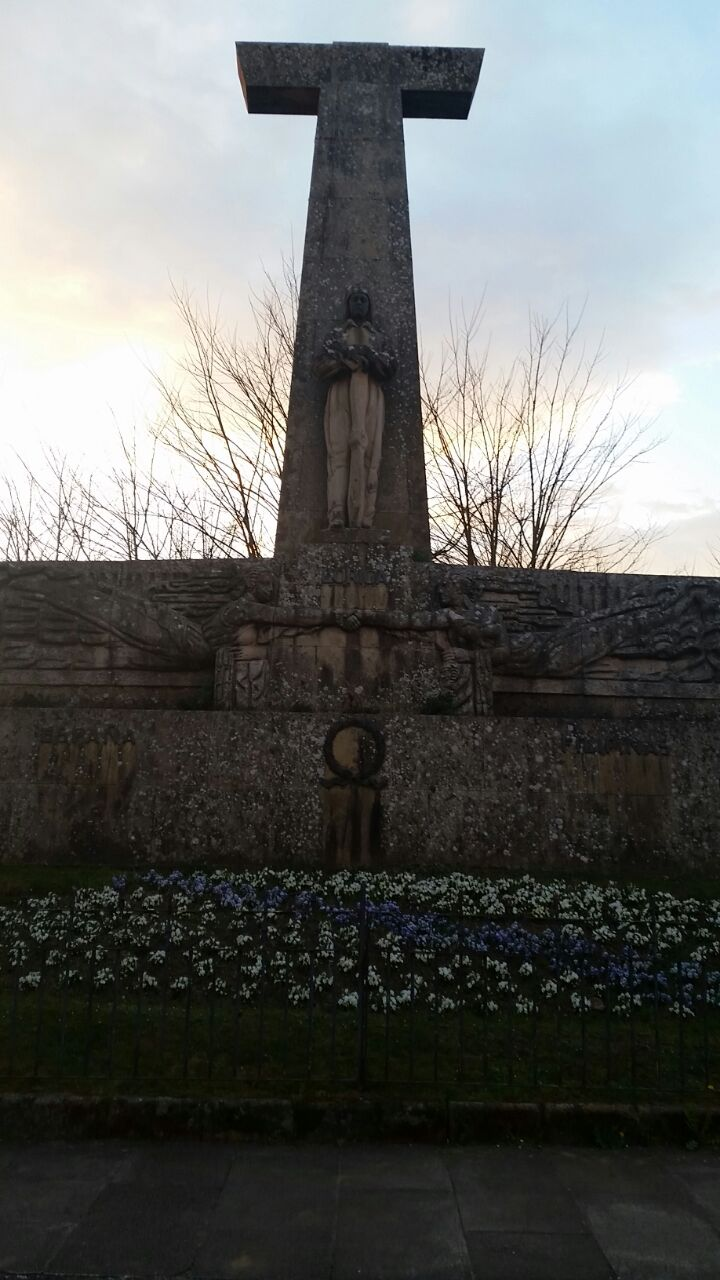
Statue of Joaquín Loriga in Lalín, Pontevedra. Author: Francisco Asorey

In 1924, Loriga, as squad leader, proposed the idea of an air route from Spain to the Philippines. At that time, there was no direct air connection between Europe and the Far East, even when France and UK were studying that possibility, considering their conquests in the area. There was a historic connection between the old Spanish colony and Spain, with commercial links and a considerable Spanish population in the capital, together with memories of the old colonial times as more beneficial than the current American occupation.

Three Breguet XIXs left Madrid on 5 April 1926, but only one plane made it to Manila. The other two planes were forced to land and were abandoned in the North African desert and on the coast of China. After each stopover, the engineers checked the airplanes. During the flight between Tripoli and Cairo, one of the biplanes flown by Rafael Martínez Estévez had to return to Tunisia due to an engine failure. Loriga, after flying through Iran, Pakistan, India and Vietnam, was forced to make an emergency landing due to a leakage of water in the biplane. He landed in Tien-Pack harbour, close to Guangzhou, in China; the crew were missing for several days, believed to have crashed into the ocean. Loriga, together with the pilot, Eduardo González-Gallarza, continued flying in the last biplane. They encountered strong dust storms between Karachi and Agra and takeoffs in fog after Calcutta, so they could only use their Stinchilla compass for navigation, the first time only instruments used in Spanish aviation. The two explorers landed in Aparri on 11 May at 2:20 in the afternoon; a multitude of Filipinos, whom the pilots described as frantic with enthusiasm, carried the Spaniards on their shoulders. The pilots later wrote, "We must confess our emotions on stepping on that land, our temples pulsated violently, our hearts beat madly and childish tears flowed from our eyes." The final stage of their flight came in the morning of 13 May. Gallarza and Loriga bade farewell to the officials and residents of Aparri, dropping small Spanish flags over Tuguegarao, Iligan, and Echague along the way as a salute to them. The pilots were escorted by 12 airplanes of the United States Army as they were halfway to Manila. At 11:20 in the morning, the two completed their mission.

On 27 May, Loriga traveled to Macao to meet with his engineer, disassemble the biplane and pack it for transportation in the steamship Claudio López before his departure to Spain.

== First airplane landing in Galicia ==
Moreover, Loriga is recognized as the first pilot to land in Galicia, his homeland, over the Monte do Toxo in Lalín 23 July 1927.

The same day of his return to Cuatro Vientos, Loriga died in an accident, when the aircraft crashed during a landing at Cuatro Vientos Airport outside Madrid. His fellow villagers raised money to honour him with a monument, tasked to Francisco Asorey, inaugurated in the village on 1933.
