= Ministry of the Air (Spain) =

Former government department of Spain (1939–1977)

- Spanish: Ministerio del Aire
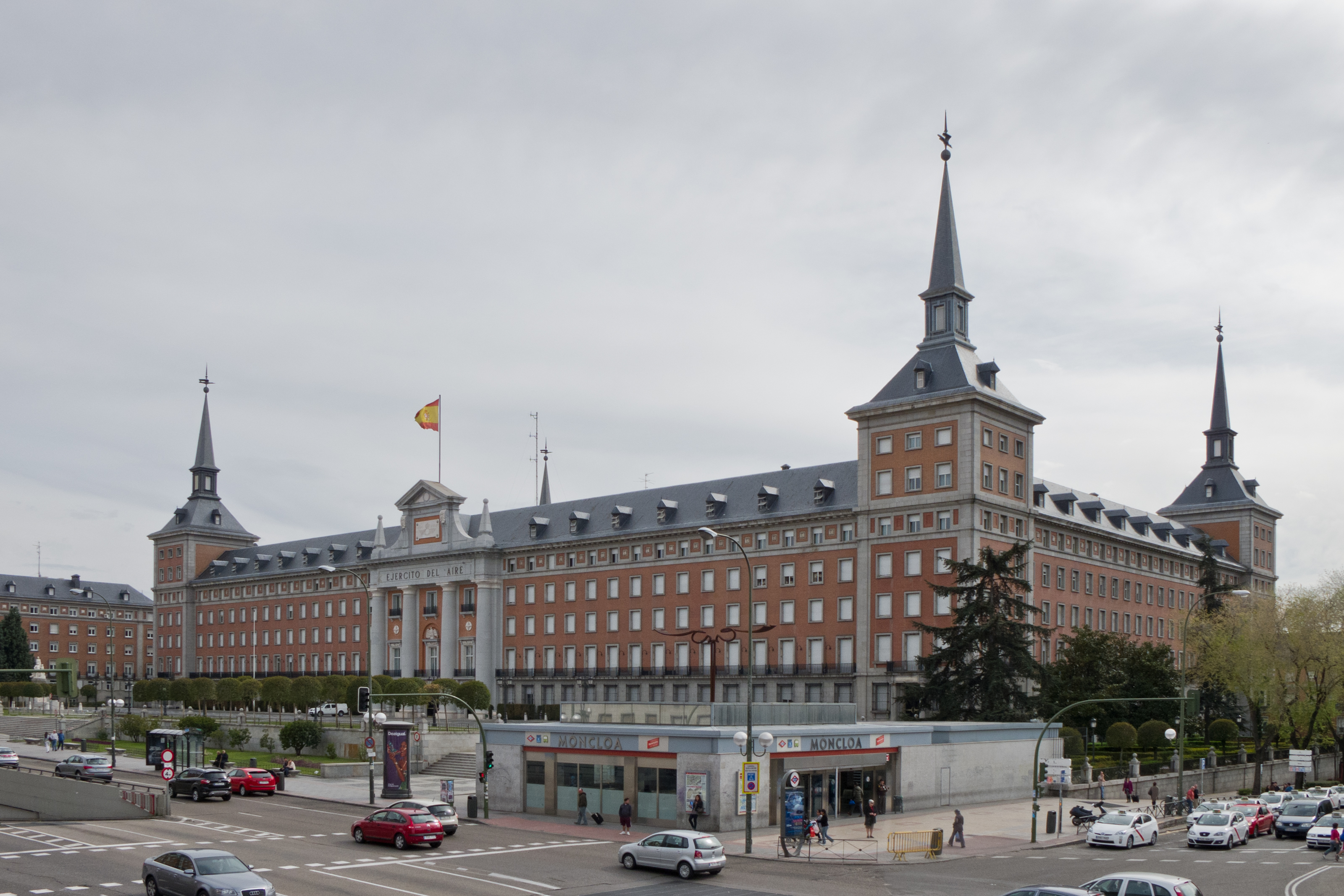
- The General Headquarters of the Air and Space Force building, formerly the site of the air ministry

Agency overview
- Formed: 9 August 1939; 87 years ago
- Preceding agency: Ministry of National Defense
- Dissolved: 4 July 1977; 49 years ago
- Superseding agency: Ministry of Defence
- Jurisdiction: Spanish Air Force and civil aviation
- Headquarters: The Ministry of the Air building
- Ministers responsible: LTG Juan Yagüe, first Minister; LTG Carlos Franco Iribarnegaray, last Minister
- Agency executive: Fernando Barron, first Undersecretary

The Ministry of the Air (Spanish: Ministerio del Aire) was a government department of Spain that was tasked with oversight of both the Spanish Air Force (Ejército del Aire) and civil aviation during the Francoist regime.

The ministry was created on 8 August 1939, after the end of the Spanish Civil War. It was dissolved on 4 July 1977 by the Royal Decree 1558/1977, being merged with the Ministry of Defence as part of the transition to democracy.

== History ==
During the Second Spanish Republic there had been the Dirección General de Aeronáutica, an agency that had both military and civil aviation under its jurisdiction, but it disappeared after the start of the Spanish Civil War.

The direct predecessor of the Ministry of the Air was the Ministry of National Defense, created in 1938 during the first government of Francisco Franco, under the then commander of the Army of the North, Fidel Dávila Arrondo. The three branches of the Armed Forces (Army, Navy and Air Force) were grouped under its control. The Ministry of the Air was created in the second government of Francisco Franco; it was defined and regulated by Law of 8 August 1939, whose organization and functions were delimited by Decree of 1 September 1939. General Juan Yagüe was appointed Minister, with Fernando Barron as Undersecretary.

After the end of the Civil War, Yagüe intended to build a new Air Force out of the Aviación Nacional with the help of Nazi Germany and Fascist Italy, and with the clear intention of participating in World War II on the side of the Axis powers. At the beginning of World War II the new Air Force had 14 regiments and 3 groups, composed in turn by 172 fighters and 164 bombers of different types, along with 82 assisting planes and 75 other devices of different types captured from the Spanish Republican Air Force. The reports issued by the General Staff, however, left in evidence the bad state in which the airplanes were, the lack of spare parts and fuel. In the end, the project to expand the Air Force was a failure given the situation in the country, and Yagüe was dismissed and replaced by General Juan Vigón. Since 1940, different locations in Madrid were searched for the future headquarters of the Ministry, and after several options a site in the district of Moncloa-Aravaca was chosen. The lots are acquired by the City Council of Madrid, under then Mayor of Madrid Alberto Alcocer y Ribacoba; General Vigón instructed architect Luis Gutiérrez Soto on the renovation of the area and the design of the new building. Although the building was not completed until 1958, it was already fulfilling its mission in 1954.

The Ministry was abolished by the Royal Decree 1558/1977 of 4 July 1977, when Prime Minister Adolfo Suárez created the Ministry of Defence as part of his second government (formed following the 1977 general election), which integrated the ministries of the Army, Navy and Air Force during the transition to democracy.

== Organic structure ==
On 5 September 1939 the structure of the Ministry was organized, being composed of the following departments:

- General Staff of the Air Force.
- Undersecretary, overseeing general directorates of: Civil Aviation, Personnel, Infrastructure, Material and Antiaeronautics (anti-aircraft).
- Senior Advisory Council.
- Private Secretary of the Minister.
- General and Technical Secretariat.
- Political Secretariat.
- Administrative Technical Board.
- Legal advice.

== List of ministers ==
No.	Portrait	Name (Birth–Death)	Term of office			Political party	Government	Ref.
No.	Portrait	Name (Birth–Death)	Took office	Left office	Time in office	Political party	Government	Ref.
1		Lieutenant General; Juan Yagüe (1891–1952)	9 August 1939	27 June 1940	323 days	Military	Franco II	
2		Lieutenant General; Juan Vigón (1880–1955)	27 June 1940	20 July 1945	5 years, 23 days	Military	Franco II	
3		Lieutenant General; Eduardo González-Gallarza (1898–1986)	20 July 1945	25 February 1957	11 years, 220 days	Military	Franco III–IV	
4		Lieutenant General; José Rodríguez y Díaz de Lecea (1894–1967)	25 February 1957	11 July 1962	5 years, 136 days	Military	Franco V	
5		Lieutenant General; José Lacalle Larraga (1897–1981)	11 July 1962	30 October 1969	7 years, 111 days	Military	Franco VI–VII	
6		Lieutenant General; Julio Salvador y Díaz-Benjumea (1910–1987)	30 October 1969	31 December 1973	4 years, 62 days	Military	Franco VIII; Carrero Blanco	
7		Lieutenant General; Mariano Cuadra Medina (1912–1981)	4 January 1974	12 December 1975	1 year, 342 days	Military	Arias Navarro I	
8		Lieutenant General; Carlos Franco Iribarnegaray (1912–1982)	12 December 1975	5 July 1977	1 year, 205 days	Military	Arias Navarro II; Suárez I	

== See also ==
- Chief of Staff of the Air Force (Spain)
