= Joaquín García Morato =

Spanish flying ace (1904–1939)

Joaquín García-Morato
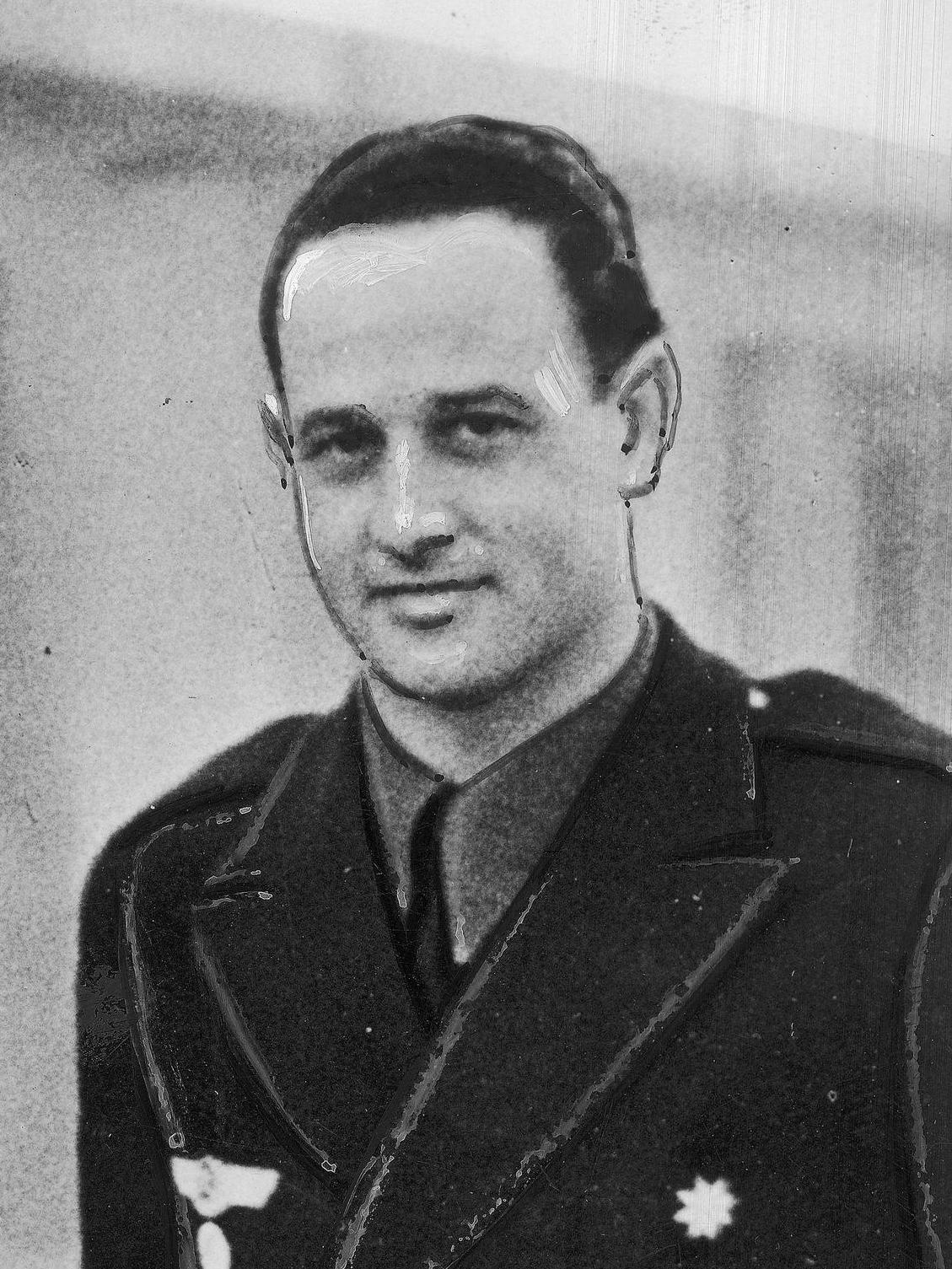
- Born: Joaquín García-Morato y Castaño; 4 May 1904; Melilla, Spain
- Died: 4 April 1939 (aged 34); Griñón, Spain
- Burial place: Málaga, Spain
- Military career
- Branch: Air Force
- Service years: 1920–1939
- Rank: Captain
- Commands: Blue Patrol
- Conflicts: Rif War; Spanish Civil War
- Awards: Laureate Cross of Saint Ferdinand

Joaquín García-Morato y Castaño, 1st Count of Jarama (4 May 1904 – 4 April 1939) was a fighter pilot for Nationalist Spain who had the highest number of aerial victories of the Spanish Civil War. He is credited with 40 aerial victories, four gained while flying Heinkel He 51s and 36 with an Italian Fiat CR.32.

An accomplished prewar pilot, Joaquín García-Morato served in Morocco (fighting Abd el-Krim insurgents during the Rif War), excelled in aerobatics, and instructed instrument flying.

== Spanish Civil War ==
He was on holiday in England when the Civil War began. Hastening home to join the Nationalist cause, he gained his first victory on 12 August 1936 in a Nieuport-Delage 52, shooting down one of three Vickers Vildebeest over Antequera. He then flew one of the first Heinkel He 51s received from Germany. Flying this aircraft, on 18 August, he shot down a Republican NiD 52 and a Potez 540. He downed another NiD 52 on 2 September. He then began flying an Italian Fiat CR.32, shooting down another NiD 52 on 11 September: it was his fifth victory.

Then he formed the Patrulla Azul ("Blue Patrol") of three CR.32. The nucleus of the squadron was Morato and two other crack pilots: Narcisco Bermudez de Castro and Julio Salvador y Díaz-Benjumea. Between them, they chose the squadron badge featuring three birds: a Hawk for the slim and crook-nosed Morato, a Bustard (or Canada goose) representing portly Bermudez and a Blackbird evoking lightly built Julio Salvador Diaz, the only one to survive the war and make a high-ranking officer and prominent politician in Franco's post war Spain.

They also chose a typically Spanish motto: Vista, Suerte, y Al Toro (A catchphrase in bullfighting circles, roughly meaning: Instinct, Luck... and go for the bull).

During the early autumn of 1936, he added six more aircraft of French manufacture, plus a British-built Hawker Fury, to his score. He gained his 12th victory on 5 November (a Potez 540), followed by his first downing of a Soviet-built Polikarpov I-15 fighter. On 13 January 1937, he managed to shoot down two Tupolev SB-2 bombers—that outperformed the Fiat in terms of speed—attacking them from a superior height: they were his victories number 16 and 17. On 18 February, during the battle for Jarama, he was escorting three Junkers Ju 52 bombers, with his two fellow pilots of the "Blue Patrol", when 36 I-15 biplanes intercepted them. The Patrulla Azul attacked the Republican fighters in a climbing turn, breaking the enemy's assault. Morato hit a first I-15 that dropped away, in a tight spiral, trailing smoke. Immediately afterwards, he avoided being hit by another enemy fighter that was chasing him and he hit another I-15: the pilot threw up his arms and collapsed in the cockpit. Then suddenly the Republican fighters dived away, while 21 Italian CR.32s were rushing to Morato's aid. For his part in this battle, Morato was awarded the highest Spanish military decoration - the Laureate Cross of Saint Ferdinand. In July 1937, after a massive attack by Republican forces in the Brunete sector, on the extreme left of the Nationalist Madrid Army Corps, some of the biggest aerial battles of the war raged. On the 14th, Morato's squadron had notable success. Accompanied by Salvador, Aristides and Guerrero, he intercepted a squadron of Polikarpov R-Z Natasha biplanes escorted by a number of Polikarpov I-16s Rata. The Nationalist pilots dived through the fighter escort, that scattered in all directions, and attacked the R-Zs, shooting down five. Two of them were credited to Morato. On 24 December 1938, Morato had one of his more successful days: he was escorting, with his group, a number of Ju 52 and SM.79 bombers, when they saw a formation of eleven R-Z "Natashas", escorted by Ratas, over Cap de la Serra. The Nationalist pilots dived to attack, and in a few minutes, they destroyed nine of the R-Zs. Three of the downings were credited to Morato.

Morato achieved 40 credited victories against Republican aircraft, gained in 1,012 hours of operational flying. The only time he was shot down was on 3 October 1937, by a novice pilot he was training.

== Death ==
Soon after the war, on 4 April 1939, he was performing low aerobatics for newsreel cameras, when his Fiat CR.32 crashed, killing him.

== General and cited reference ==
- Beevor, Antony (1983). The Spanish Civil War. New York: Peter Bedrick Books. ISBN 0-911745-11-4.
- Jackson, Robert (1979). Fighter! The Story of Air Combat 1936-1945. London: Artur Barker Limited. ISBN 0-213-16717-4.
- Logoluso, Alfredo (2010). Fiat CR.32 Aces of the Spanish Civil War. Oxford: Osprey Publishing. ISBN 978-1-84603-983-6.
- Shores, Christopher (1983). Air Aces. Greenwich, CT: Bison Books. ISBN 0-86124-104-5.

Regnal titles
New creation	Count of Jarama; 1950	Succeeded by María José García-Morato y Gálvez
