= Spanish Air and Space Force Anthem =

When the Spanish Air Force was created in 1940, an anthem was created, but was changed in 1967 to what is currently sung today. It was created by José María Pemán and Ricardo Dorado and was chosen among 198 other works presented to a competition call by the Spanish Air Ministry.

Spanish Royal Air and Space Force Anthem
Alcemos el vuelo	We take flight
sobre el alto cielo	above the high sky
lejos de la tierra	far from the earth
la esperanza nos lleva detrás	the hope brings us back
el Aire en la guerra	the Air during the war
comienza a ser paz.	begins to be peaceful
Midiendo del Aire la limpia grandeza	Measuring from the air the clean grandeur
el alma se llena de luz y de amor	the soul fills itself of light and of love
la vida y la muerte cantan la belleza	life and death sing the beauty
de una España más clara y mejor	of a clearer and better Spain
Volad, alas gloriosas de España	Fly, glorious wings of Spain
estrellas de un cielo radiante de sol	stars of a radiant sky of sunshine
y escribid sobre el viento la hazaña	and write about the wind, the deeds,
la gloria infinita de ser español	the infinite glory of being Spanish.
A España ofrecida,	Offered to Spain,
tengo muerte y vida	I have death and life
como quien la juega	as anyone who plays it
en un lance de gloria y honor	in a fight of glory and honor
la aurora me leva	the dawn weighs me
como un nuevo amor	as a new love
Alegre la mano tenaz el empeño	Happy the persistent hand the insistence
la rosa del viento tomamos por cruz	the compass we take as a cross
jamás bajaremos desde nuestro sueño	we will never come down from our dream
a una España sin gloria y sin luz	to a Spain without glory and without light
volad, alas gloriosas de España	Fly, glorious wings of Spain
estrellas de un cielo radiante de sol	stars of a radiant sky of sunshine
y escribid sobre el viento la hazaña	and write about the wind, the deeds,
la gloria infinita de ser español	the infinite glory of being Spanish.

== See also ==
- Spanish Air and Space Force
