= Carlos Franco Iribarnegaray =

Spanish general

Minister of the Air of Spain
- In office 12 December 1975 – 5 July 1977
- Prime Minister: Carlos Arias Navarro; Adolfo Suárez
- Preceded by: Mariano Cuadra Medina
- Succeeded by: Manuel Gutiérrez Mellado (Defence)

Personal details
- Born: Carlos Franco Iribarnegaray; 30 August 1912 Ferrol, Galicia, Kingdom of Spain
- Died: 11 December 1982 (aged 70) Madrid, Spain

Military service
- Branch/service: Spanish Armed Forces
- Years of service: 1931–1982

Carlos Franco Iribarnegaray (30 August 1912 – 11 December 1982) was a Spanish general who served as Minister of the Air of Spain between 1975 and 1977.
