= Cine Callao =

Building in Madrid, Spain

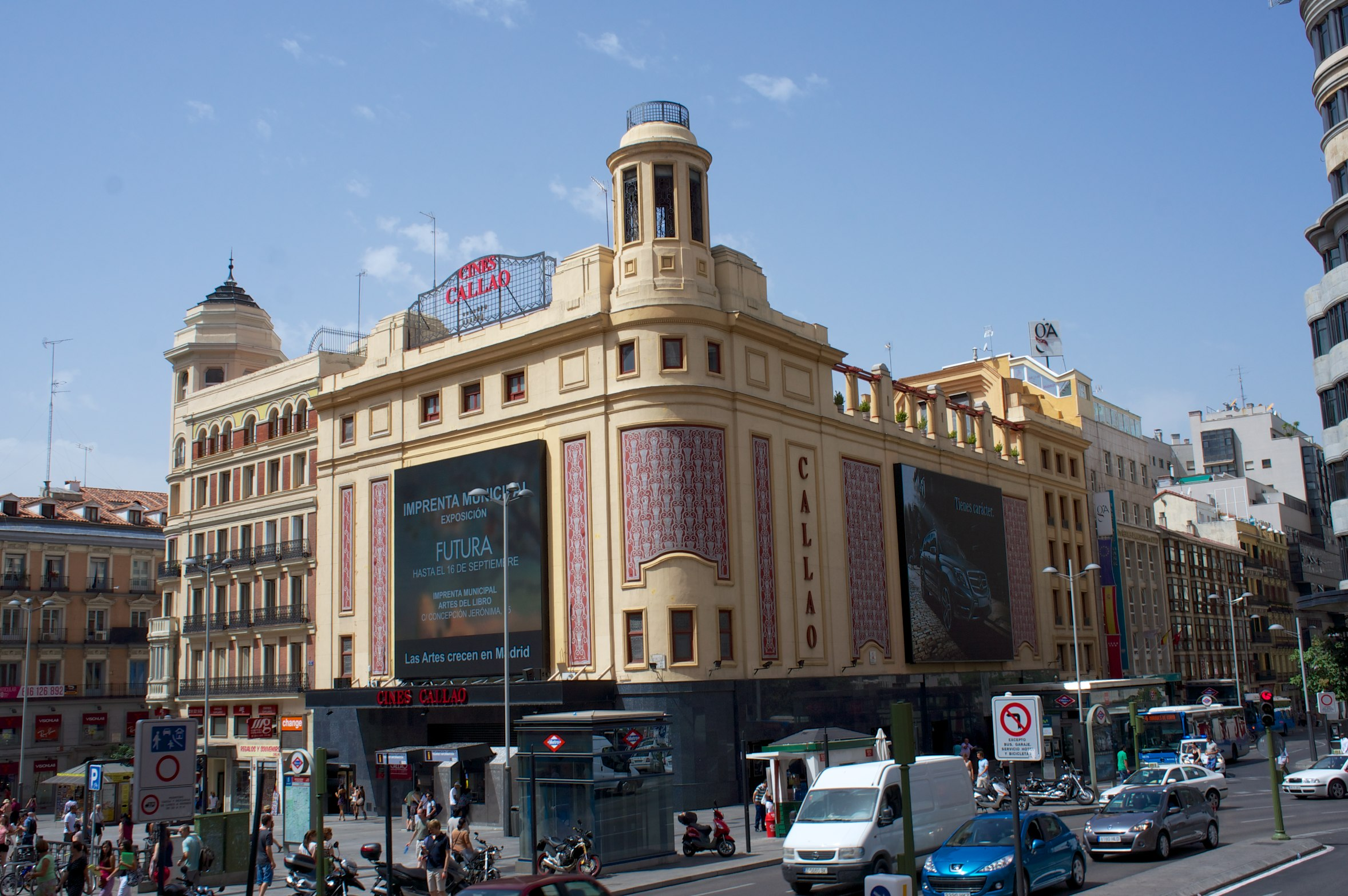
- Interactive map of Cine Callao
- Address: Plaza del Callao, 2 Madrid, Spain
- Coordinates: 40.42°N 3.706°W

Construction
- Opened: 11 December 1926
- Architect: Luis Gutiérrez Soto

Cine Callao is a building located in Plaza de Callao in Madrid. It is a common venue for film premieres and press screenings.

Designed by Luis Gutiérrez Soto, the facade features elements inspired by the Art Deco. The building was inaugurated on 11 December 1926. On 13 June 1929, it hosted the first screening in Spain of a film featuring synchronized speech, The Jazz Singer. In the 1970s, its basement housed the 'Xenon' discotheque. As of 2018, the building contained 2 film screens. It also features two large screens on its facade.
