= General Headquarters of the Air and Space Force =

Building in Madrid, Spain

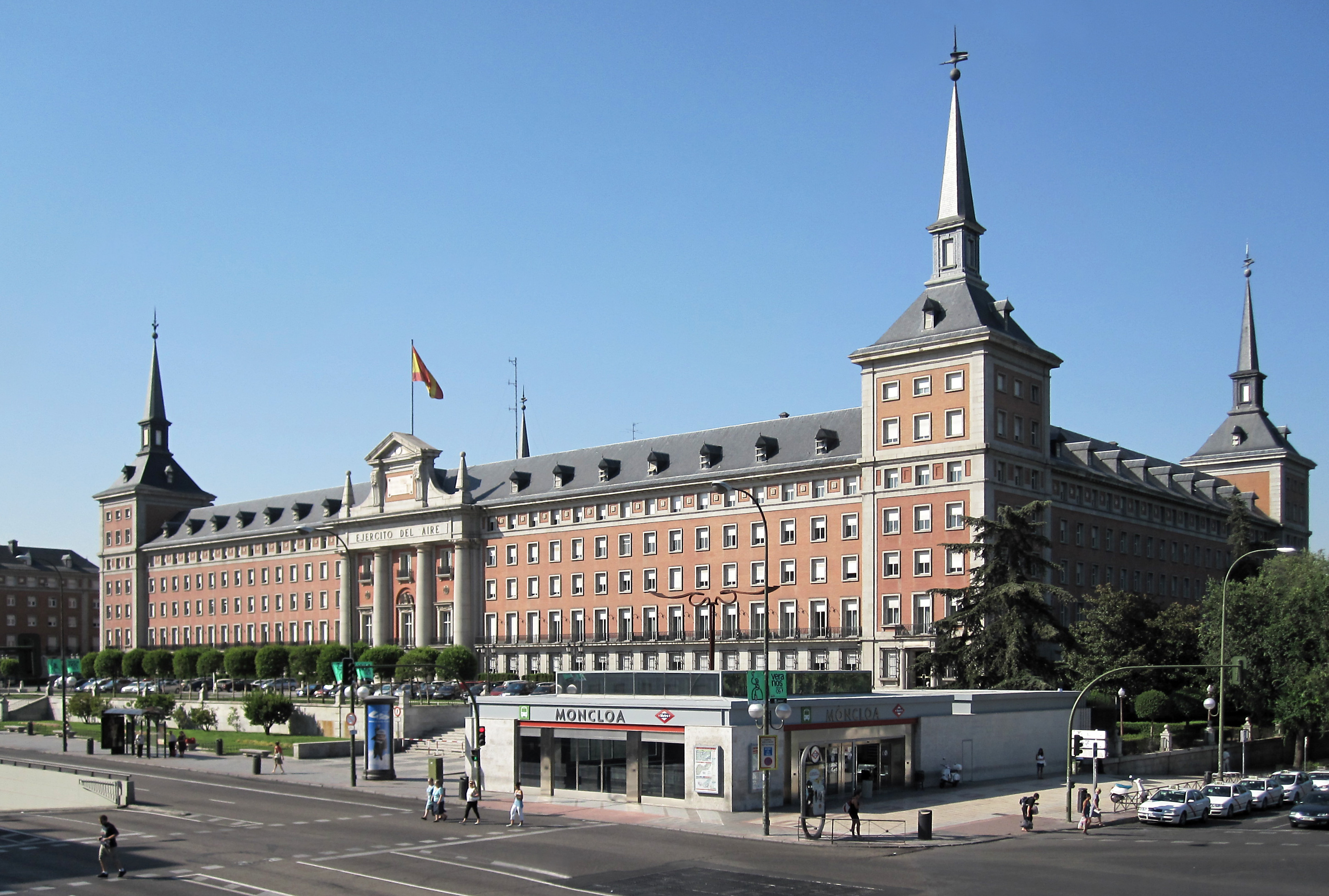
- Interactive map of the General Headquarters of the Air and Space Force area

General information
- Location: Argüelles, Madrid, Plaza de la Moncloa, Spain
- Construction started: 1943
- Completed: 1958

Design and construction
- Architect: Luis Gutiérrez Soto

The General Headquarters of the Air and Space Force (Spanish: Cuartel General del Ejército del Aire y del Espacio), also known in Spanish as the Ministerio del Aire (after the institution it formerly hosted), is a building in Madrid, Spain.

== History ==
Once the Spanish Civil War had ended with the Francoist faction's victory and after the requirement of a smallholding for the construction of the Ministry of the Air Force's headquarters in 1939 filed by Juan Vigón, the plot of land occupied by the Modelo Prison was chosen and ceded as the building site.

In order to present the project, the architect, Luis Gutiérrez Soto, traveled to Rome and Berlin to study buildings with a similar purpose, elaborating an initial draft reminiscent of Paul Ludwig Troost and Albert Speer's works. His project was reworked several times, discarding the neoclassicist elements, and ultimately, pandering to the imperial historicism sought by the Francoist regime, it adopted the herrerian elements, inspired by El Escorial. The building was intended to be part of a wider effort to create the image of an "Imperial Madrid". Nonetheless the delusions of grandeur vis-à-vis the so-called "Imperial Cornice" caught up with reality and the scarcity during the Post-War and most of the individual projects ended up either filed, unfinished or mutilated, with the single clear success being precisely the Ministry of the Air.

The formal beginning of the construction (undertaken by Huarte y Compañía) took place on 10 December 1943. Although building works did not fully end until 1958, parts of the building were already in use in 1954.
