= José Rodríguez y Díaz de Lecea =

Spanish military personnel (1894–1967)

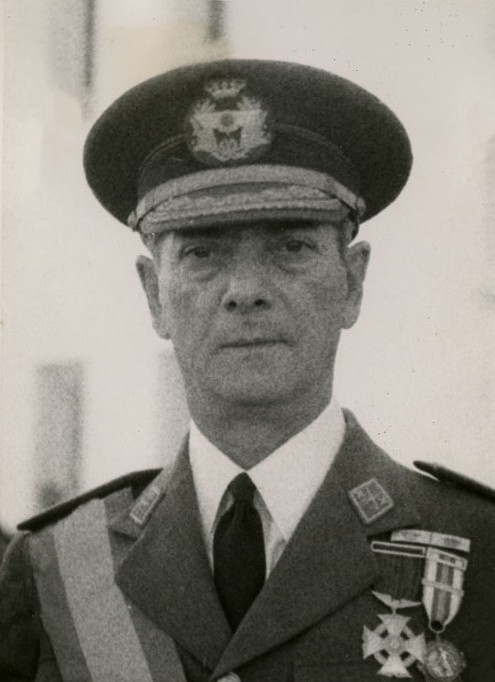

Minister of the Air of Spain
- In office 25 February 1957 – 11 July 1962
- Prime Minister: Francisco Franco
- Preceded by: Eduardo González-Gallarza
- Succeeded by: José Lacalle Larraga

Personal details
- Born: José Rodríguez y Díaz de Lecea; 2 May 1894 Matanzas, Cuba, Kingdom of Spain
- Died: 28 November 1967 (aged 73) Madrid, Spanish State

Military service
- Branch/service: Spanish Armed Forces

José Rodríguez y Díaz de Lecea (2 May 1894 – 28 November 1967) was a Spanish general who served as Minister of the Air of Spain between 1957 and 1962, during the Francoist dictatorship.
