= Mariano Cuadra Medina =

Minister of the Air of Spain
- In office 4 January 1974 – 12 December 1975
- Prime Minister: Carlos Arias Navarro
- Preceded by: Julio Salvador y Díaz-Benjumea
- Succeeded by: Carlos Franco Iribarnegaray

Personal details
- Born: Mariano Cuadra Medina; 12 May 1912 Madrid, Kingdom of Spain
- Died: 2 March 1981 (aged 68) Madrid, Spain

Military service
- Branch/service: Spanish Armed Forces
- Years of service: 1925–1987

Mariano Cuadra Medina (12 May 1912 – 2 March 1981) was a Spanish general who served as Minister of the Air of Spain between 1974 and 1975, during the Francoist dictatorship. During World War II, he volunteered to serve in the military of fellow fascist state Germany. He commanded a squadron of the Blue Squadron.
