= Eduardo González-Gallarza =

Spanish military personnel & politician (1898–1986)

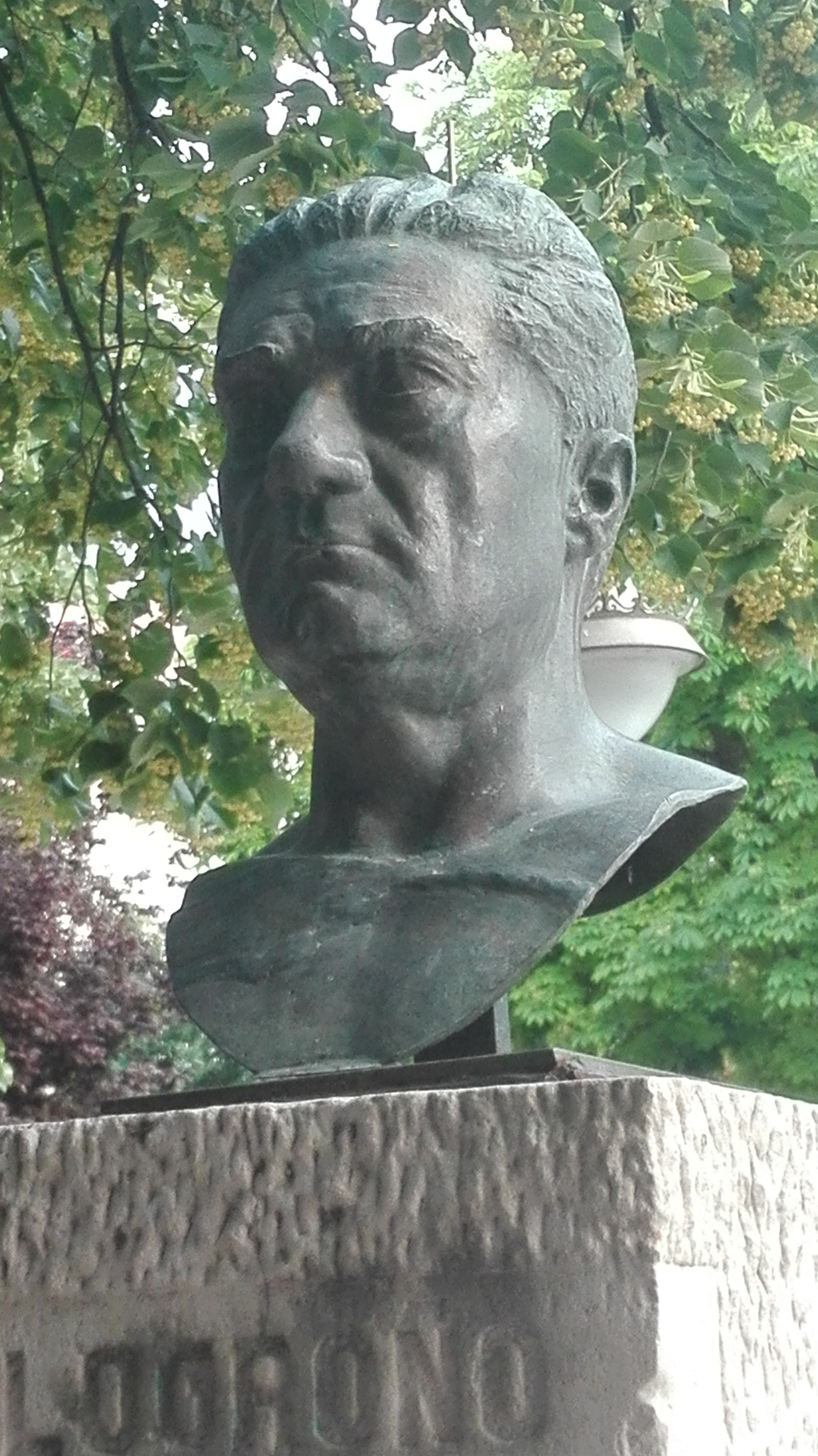
- Bust of Eduardo González-Gallarza in Logroño

Minister of the Air of Spain
- In office 20 July 1945 – 25 February 1957
- Prime Minister: Francisco Franco
- Preceded by: Juan Vigón
- Succeeded by: José Rodríguez y Díaz de Lecea

Personal details
- Born: Eduardo González-Gallarza Iragorri; 18 April 1898 Logroño, Kingdom of Spain
- Died: 24 May 1986 (aged 88) Madrid, Spain

Military service
- Branch/service: Spanish Armed Forces
- Years of service: 1913–1986

Eduardo González-Gallarza Iragorri (18 April 1898 – 24 May 1986) was a Spanish general who served as Minister of the Air of Spain between 1945 and 1957, during the Francoist dictatorship.
