= Julio Salvador y Díaz-Benjumea =

Minister of the Air of Spain
- In office 30 October 1969 – 4 January 1974
- Prime Minister: Francisco Franco; Luis Carrero Blanco
- Preceded by: José Lacalle Larraga
- Succeeded by: Mariano Cuadra Medina

Personal details
- Born: Julio Salvador y Díaz-Benjumea; 22 May 1910 Cádiz, Kingdom of Spain
- Died: 22 June 1987 (aged 77) Madrid, Spain

Military service
- Branch/service: Spanish Armed Forces
- Years of service: 1925–1987

Julio Salvador y Díaz-Benjumea (22 May 1910 – 22 June 1987) was a Spanish general who served as Minister of the Air of Spain between 1969 and 1974, during the Francoist dictatorship.

He entered the military academy in the age of 15 and became a fighter pilot. He fought in the Spanish Civil War on the Nationalist side, and flew as a wingman to Joaquín García Morato, the top-scoring fighter ace in the Patrulla Azul. He himself scored 24 personal and 2 shared victories, on Fiat CR.32 fighter, qualifying as an ace himself too.

When the war ended, he was sent to the 22nd Fighter Regiment (Tablada) and was later named as leader of the Fighter School, which had been moved from Villanubla to Reus and then to Morón, where it remained until it was disbanded in 1953. He was promoted to Comandante. He relieved Salas in Command of the Spanish expeditionary squadron in Russia, where he remained from March to November 1942. He returned to Morón, remaining there until he was named as Air Attaché in Washington.

Later, he was Director of the Academia General del Aire, Chief of Staff for the Straits Air Region, leader of the Defensive Air Forces and second in command of the Alto Esládo Mayor. In November 1969, he was named Air Minister (until 1974) and in 1970 was promoted to Lieutenant-General. He continued to fly until April 1976, by then he had totalled 7906 flying hours. Salvador finally retired from military service in 1980, after which he served as President of the Reserve of the Ejercito del Aire until his death.

Salvador passed away on 22 June 1987.
