= José Lacalle Larraga =

Spanish general, politician (1897–1981)

Minister of the Air of Spain
- In office 11 July 1962 – 30 October 1969
- Prime Minister: Francisco Franco
- Preceded by: José Rodríguez y Díaz de Lecea
- Succeeded by: Julio Salvador y Díaz-Benjumea

Personal details
- Born: José Daniel Lacalle Larraga; 21 February 1897 Valtierra, Kingdom of Spain
- Died: 21 July 1981 (aged 84) Madrid, Spain

Military service
- Branch/service: Spanish Armed Forces
- Years of service: 1911–1981

José Daniel Lacalle Larraga (21 February 1897 – 21 July 1981) was a Spanish general who served as Minister of the Air of Spain between 1962 and 1969, during the Francoist dictatorship.
