= Luis Gutiérrez Soto =

Spanish architect (1900–1977)

- Born: 1900; Calle de Villanueva, Madrid, Spain
- Died: 1977 (aged 76–77); Madrid, Spain
- Resting place: Mingorrubio Cemetery, El Pardo, Spain
- Occupation: Architect

Luis Gutiérrez Soto (1900–1977) was a Spanish architect. He worked primarily in Madrid.

== Biography ==
Luis Gutiérrez Soto was born on 6 June 1900 in the Calle de Villanueva, Madrid, Spain. After earning a degree in 1923, he became Chief Architect of the Ministry of Public Instruction, delivering a profuse number of projects of schools until 1929. His first noted project was the Cine Callao (1926).

Once a follower of the rationalist architectural style, he reinvented himself during the Francoist dictatorship (1939–1975), adapting to the traditionalist aesthetics promoted by the regime, and became a representative of the neo-herrerian francoist style.

He died in Madrid on 4 February 1977. He was buried in the Mingorrubio Cemetery in El Pardo. With a period of activity spanning along six decades, he delivered over 650 projects, most of them in Madrid.
